= Assassination of Sadi Carnot =

1894 murder of the French President

- Part of Ère des attentats
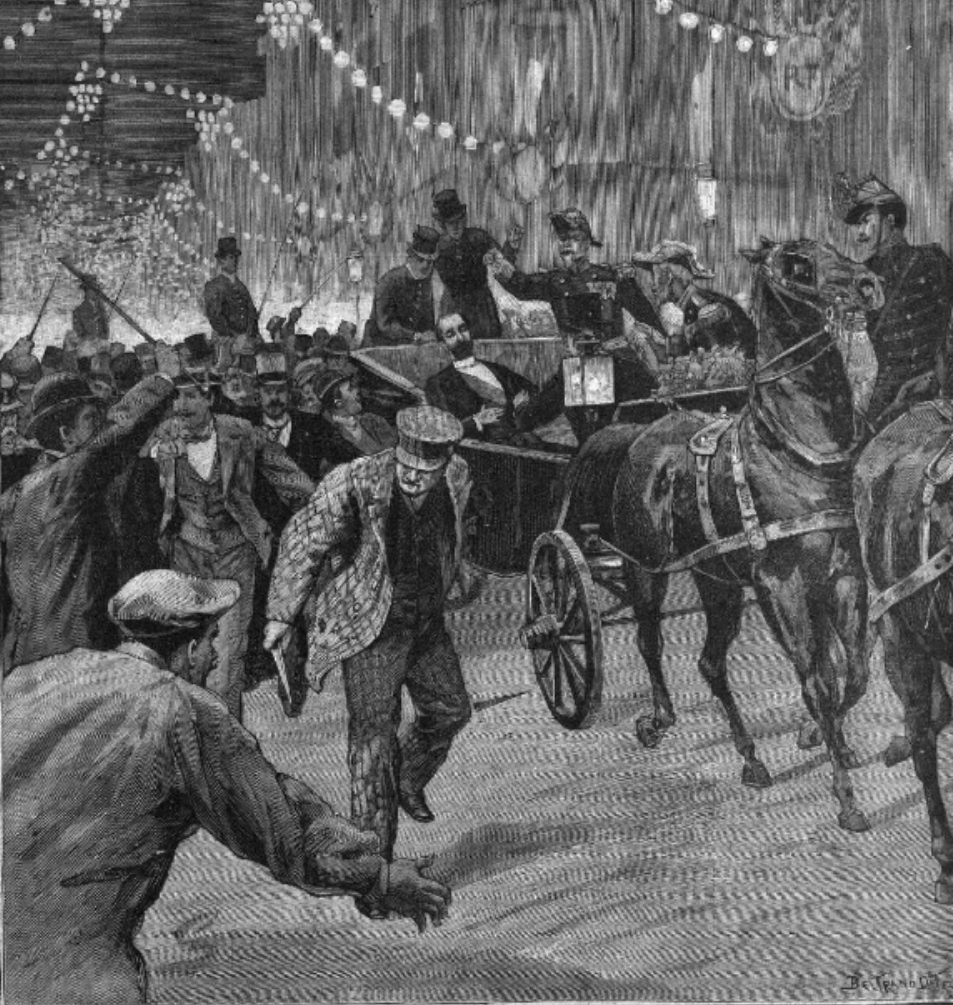
- Representation of the assassination of Sadi Carnot by Sante Caserio, Le Petit Parisien: supplément illustré (8 July 1894)
- Location: Lyon, France
- Date: 24 June 1894
- Target: Sadi Carnot
- Attack type: Stabbing
- Weapon: Dagger
- Deaths: 1
- Injuries: 0
- Perpetrator: Sante Geronimo Caserio
- Motive: Anarchism (propaganda by the deed and vengeance for the repressions targetting anarchists); Anticolonialism
- Accused: 1
- Verdict: Guilty

On 24 June 1894, French President Sadi Carnot was assassinated by Italian anarchist Sante Geronimo Caserio in Lyon, France. A part of the Ère des attentats anarchist terrorist campaign (1892–1894), it led to a historic crackdown on French anarchist activities.

Carnot was one of the main supporters of the lois scélérates ('villainous laws'), which aimed to break up anarchist activities during the Ère des attentats, as well as the repression targeting them in early 1894. He became a central target to the movement, especially after refusing to pardon anarchist terrorists Ravachol, Auguste Vaillant, and Émile Henry: the first two having not caused any deaths during their attacks. Vaillant's death in particular sparked a desire for revenge against Carnot, as Vaillant's young daughter Sidonie became orphaned. Caserio, a refugee in France, then likely started working with a small group of anarchists to assassinate him.

Caserio left Sète in late June 1894 and headed for Lyon, trying to deter police from tailing him. He arrived at the first French Colonial Exhibition, as the attack was also an anti-colonial statement, and was positioned precisely to the right of Carnot's procession. As the President mingled with the crowd, Caserio lunged at him, stabbed him, and then tried to flee before being beaten by the crowd and arrested. Carnot died from his injuries that night, and Caserio was brought to trial. He claimed to have acted alone, a position questioned by historians, but accepted by the French judiciary, which sought to bring him to trial as quickly as possible. He was sentenced to death and executed.

Carnot's death was a major shock to the French population, and many people paid tribute to him. His remains were placed in the Panthéon. The assassination provoked significant xenophobic violence directed against Italians in the Rhône region, and resulted in the Chamber of Deputies' adoption of the last, most significant of the lois scélérates: prohibiting all types of anarchist propaganda in France (until its repeal in 1992). The law was the basis for the Trial of the Thirty in August 1894, which aimed to destroy the nation's anarchist movement.

== History ==
=== Context ===
==== Development of anarchism and propaganda by the deed ====
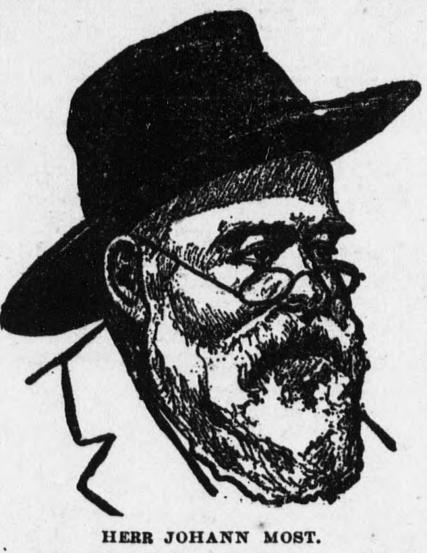
Johann Most, one of the main theoricians and inventors of the strategy of propaganda by the deed (1906)

In the 19th century, anarchism was born and established itself in Europe before spreading. Anarchists advocate for the struggle against all forms of domination perceived as unjust, including economic domination, with the development of capitalism. They are particularly opposed to the State, seen as the institution that validates many of these dominations through its police, army, and propaganda.

At the end of the 1870s, anarchists developed the strategy of propaganda by the deed, aiming to communicate anarchist ideas directly through action, without recourse to discourse, and to precipitate the Revolution through actions that incite the people to revolt. Leading anarchist figures extensively developed this strategy, such as Peter Kropotkin, Errico Malatesta, Andrea Costa, Carlo Cafiero, and especially Johann Most. In 1879, it was adopted by the congress of the Jura Federation in La Chaux-de-Fonds. It gained renewed centrality at the International Congresses of Paris and London in May and July 1881.

In 1881, the first attack of this nature in France, the Saint-Germain-en-Laye bombing, failed to destroy the statue of Adolphe Thiers that it targeted. In the years that followed, the practice became widespread in anarchist circles in France—especially as the French State's repression against them intensified, which created dynamics of vengeance on the part of the anarchists.

On 1 May 1891, two simultaneous events occurred during the mobilisation day: on the one hand, in Fourmies, the French army carried out the massacre of peaceful strikers who were demonstrating in the church square. On the other hand, anarchists demonstrating between Levallois-Perret and Clichy found themselves in a violent confrontation with the police after taking refuge in a wine shop, three of them, arrested after the shooting, were transferred and then severely beaten at the police station by the police officers. This became known as the Clichy Affair. These two events provoked the anger and fear of the anarchists, a situation reinforced by the trial of the Clichy defendants, where the police were not prosecuted.

In this context, anarchists like Ravachol began carrying out attacks targeting the presumed officials responsible for the repression of anarchists—starting with the judge in the Clichy affair: Edmond Benoît. Thus, in 1892, a period in French history opened that the contemporary press and Jean Maitron termed the Ère des attentats ('Era of Attacks'), a period marked by great political violence between the French State, which further intensified repression against anarchists, and the latter, who responded with increasing terrorist violence.

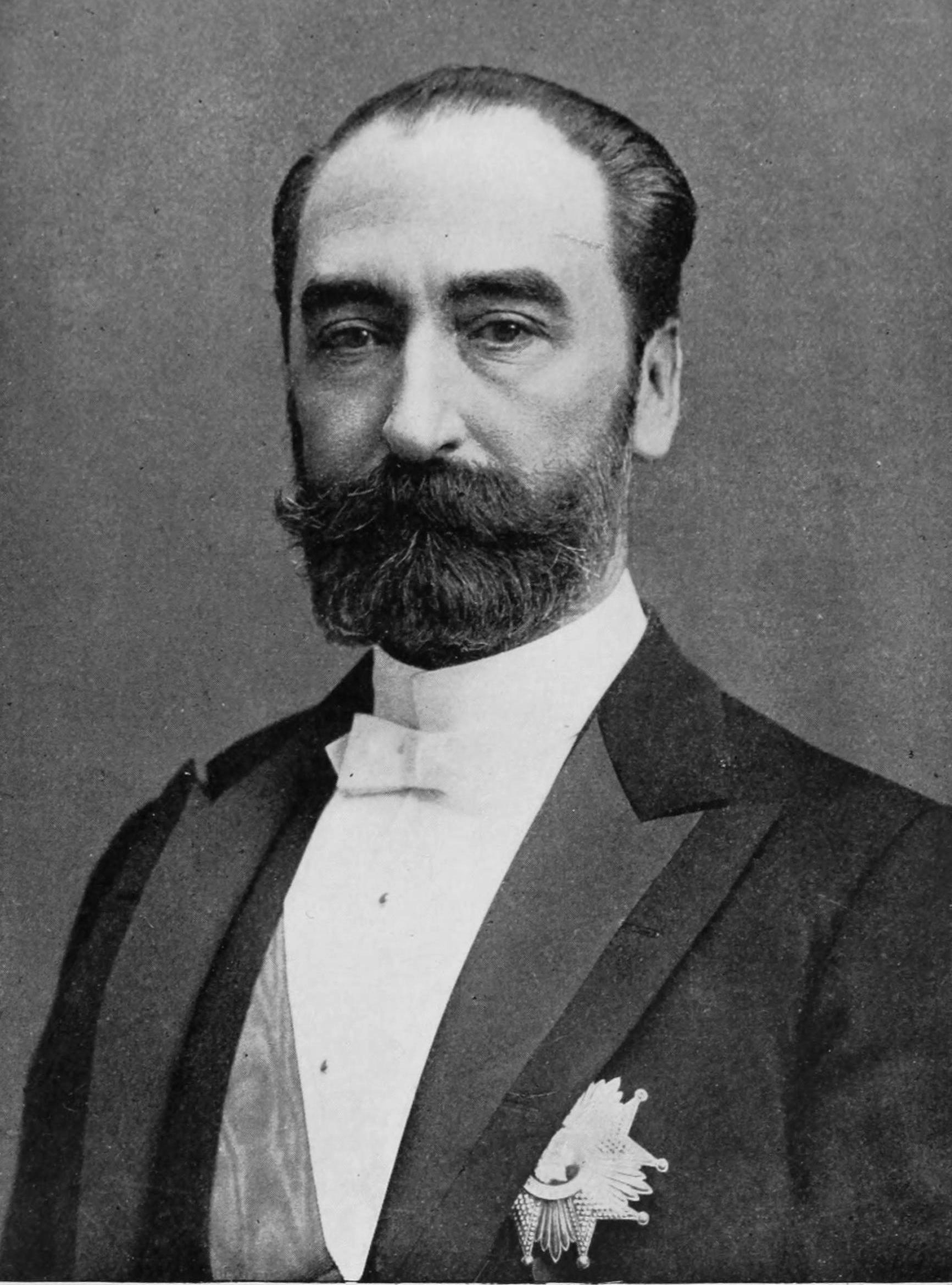
Official portrait of Sadi Carnot (1887)

==== Sadi Carnot: a president in conflict with anarchists ====
At the centre, both of the theory of propaganda by the deed—which aims to target political or financial leaders in order to provoke revolutionary and insurrectionary phenomena where the people would bring about the Revolution, and of the anarchists' desire for vengeance, stood Sadi Carnot. Carnot, born on 11 August 1837 in Limoges, came from a family that included many names from the Republican elite; he was particularly distinguished by the prestige of his grandfather, Lazare Carnot, nicknamed 'Carnot the Great', a member of the Committee of Public Safety during the Reign of Terror and a notable figure of the French Revolution.

Sadi, for his part, pursued a career as a senior civil servant and held numerous political and governmental posts: Deputy for the Côte-d'Or, Prefect of Seine-Inférieure, then Under-Secretary of State for Public Works. He was subsequently appointed Minister of Public Works, then Minister of Finance. Following the resignation of Jules Grévy, who was implicated in the decorations scandal, Carnot surpassed Jules Ferry in the first round of the 1887 presidential election. He then won in the second round, on 3 December 1887, against General Félix Gustave Saussier with 616 votes to 188. At the beginning of his mandate, Carnot was relatively well-regarded by the population and French political parties; the parliamentary Left and Right agreed on him because he offered assurances to the political orientations of the parties represented in Parliament. However, as his term progressed—which notably included the Panama scandal, his political choices alienated a portion of the population and, most notably, the anarchists.

In the summer of 1892, Ravachol was the first anarchist executed in France after Carnot refused to grant him a pardon, despite a campaign by the anarchist press to obtain it. This execution caused a profound shock among anarchists and centralised their attention on Carnot. Louise Michel opened her text Today or Tomorrow, shortly after the anarchist's execution, by writing about the Élysée palace, official residence of the French President:

Today or Tomorrow by Louise Michel in l'Endehors (17 July 1892) (courtesy of Archives anarchistes)

So much the better if these bandits have finished their work. The scaffold has started the party, and the fire will beat its wings over the apotheosis.

The blood of Ravachol splashes, from his false collar to his cuffs, the cold man of the Élysée.

The Élysée! That's the spot that draws the looks!

From it the grand finale, the final bouquet will rise into the air, and the cross of Our Lady of the Slaughter will be the streetlamp.

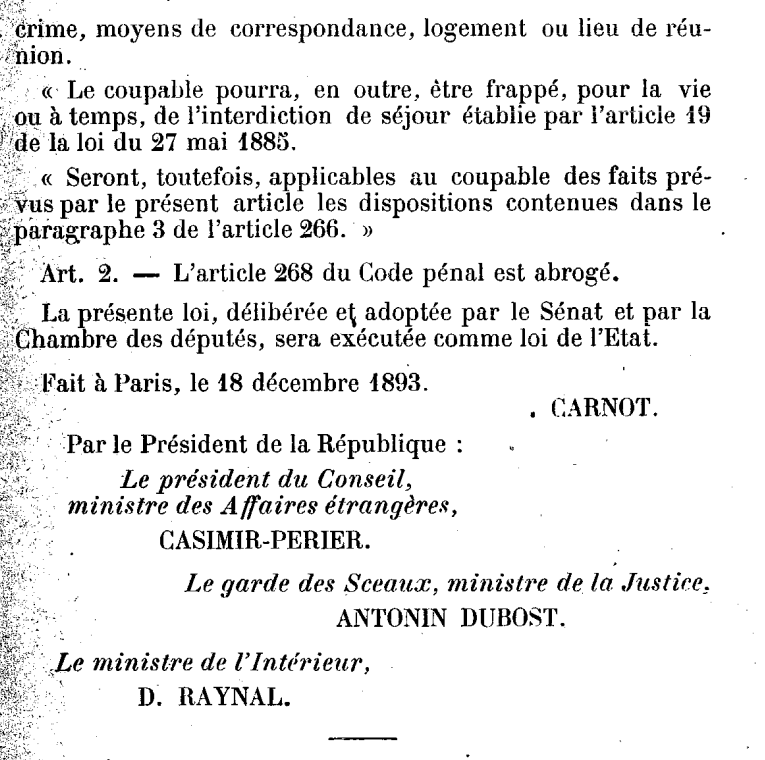
Carnot's signature at the bottom of the 2nd loi scélérate

Carnot's stance towards the anarchists, already on the verge of complete rupture, reached the point of no return after the National Assembly bombing by Auguste Vaillant, who entered the building with a small-calibre bomb and threw it at the deputies. The bomb exploded, killed no one, and slightly injured its victims, including Vaillant himself, which he claimed was a deliberate choice on his part. Two days after this attack, a series of two highly repressive laws against the anarchist movement, the first two lois scélérates ('villainous laws'), were already drafted and ready to be voted on. Supported by Sadi Carnot, who was one of their principal promoters, they drastically increased the repression of anarchists and led to the repression of January and February 1894, where thousands were arrested across French territory.

Furthermore, Vaillant, in prison, was tried quickly and, within a few weeks, was sentenced to death. A significant part of the Parisian population was moved by the fate of his only daughter, Sidonie Vaillant, and the poverty of the Vaillant family—especially since he had targeted unpopular deputies involved in the ongoing Panama Scandal. She repeatedly requested a pardon for her father, even writing to Sadi's wife, Cécile Carnot, without success—and her appeals remained unanswered.

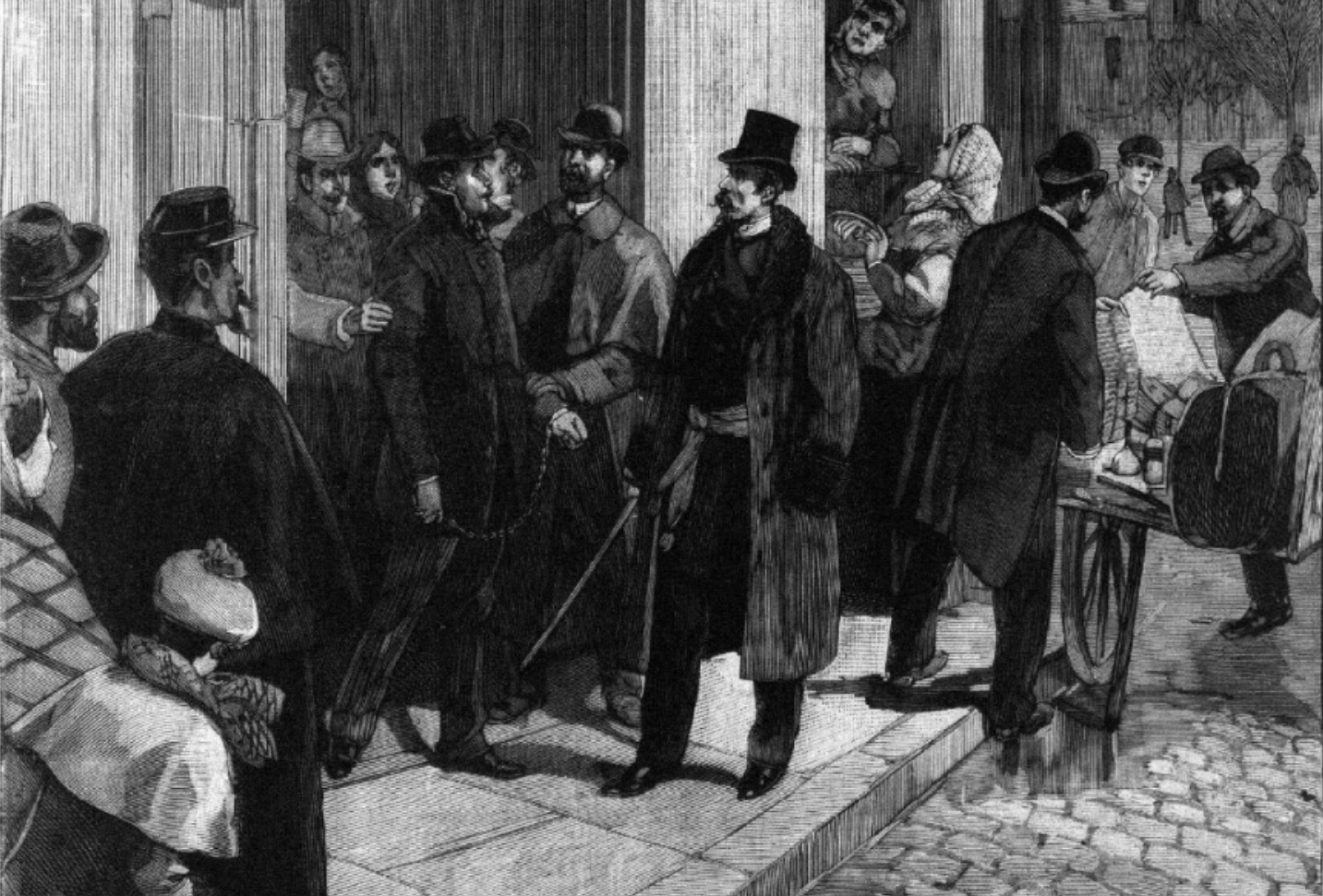
Representation of an anarchist being arrested in Le Petit Parisien: supplément illustré (4 April 1894)

Vaillant was executed on 5 February 1894; the very next day, a pamphlet published in London in French and secretly distributed in France called for vengeance targeting him, he became the primary target of anarchists in France, both as Head of State and as the person responsible for the persecutions. This text, titled To Carnot the Killer, concluded by declaring:

For you must die, assassins, you must die, for the health of the People, for the glory of the Revolution. [...] You can surround yourself with snitches dressed as bourgeois, with cops in uniform, you can hide in your bandit's den. Nothing will change the outcome, Sadi-the-Killer; passing over you, the people's Justice will come to strike you there, if need be. Because now, your skin is the target, scum! [...] When you and your gang are finished, Revolution, Anarchy, will rise sublime and triumphant! You took Vaillant's head, we will take yours, President Carnot!

It is plausible to consider that from this moment onward, at least, several anarchist groups began seeking to assassinate him for vengeance, and he became a prime target. In February 1894, the illegalist anarchists of the Ortiz gang and Émile Henry were in Paris. It is conceivable that the latter, and certain members of the Ortiz gang, such as possibly Léon Ortiz or Paolo Chiericotti, wished to undertake an attack targeting him. In any case, Émile Henry set out into Paris on 12 February 1894, a week after Vaillant's execution, and sought to assassinate Carnot. Unable to approach the Élysée palace due to an overly heavy police presence, he went to the Café Terminus, where he committed an attack.

==== Sante Caserio ====
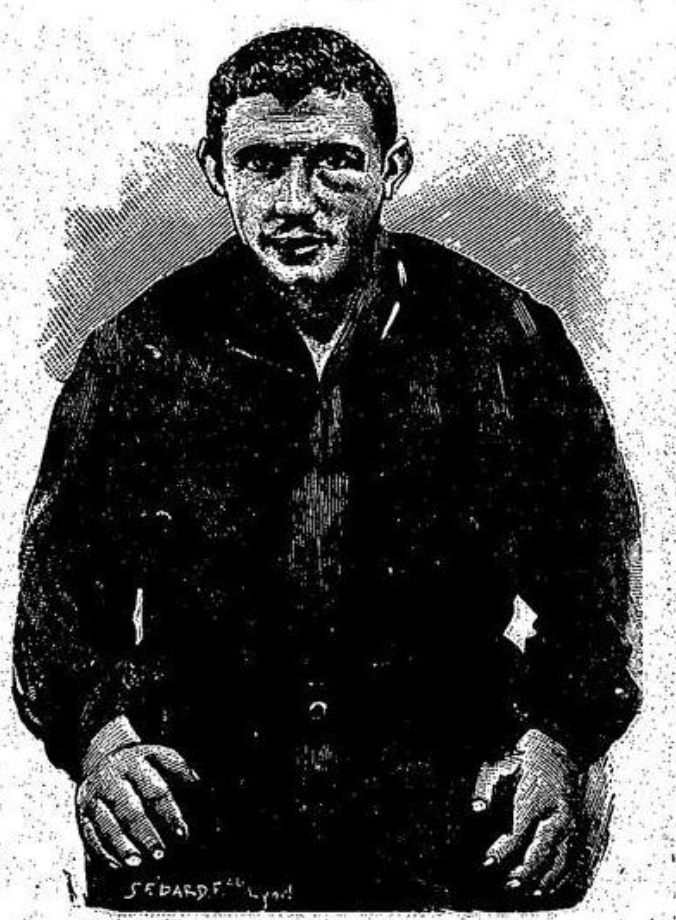
Depiction of Sante Caserio in L'Univers illustré (14 July 1894)

Sante Geronimo Caserio, born on 8 September 1873, in Motta Visconti, was a young man in his early twenties. Coming from a poor family, he had to leave school at a young age and began working as a baker in Milan at the age of thirteen. He was well-regarded in this job and remained there for part of his adolescence. In his late teens, Caserio met anarchist companions like Pietro Gori and joined the anarchist movement in Italy. Gradually, the activist became a notable figure in the anarchist circles of the Lombard city.

On 26 April 1892, Caserio was arrested by the Italian police for distributing anti-militarist leaflets to soldiers; incarcerated until his trial where Gori acted as his lawyer, he received a sentence of eight months in prison. This convinced him to appeal and, while released pending the hearing, he obtained false papers from a companion and fled the country, crossing into Switzerland, where he was welcomed. There, he resumed his job as a baker, organised a strike, and then decided to move to France because the Swiss authorities were starting to become suspicious of his presence, especially since he began engaging in anarchist agitation. The anarchist then crossed the border into France and reached Lyon, where he met a number of anarchists—managing to evade the surveillance of the French authorities because he could not speak French and therefore did not frequent the city's anarchist groups.

Caserio then moved to Sète, where he started working as a baker again and got along well with his employer, who appreciated his seriousness and the fact that he did not drink, although he smoked heavily. At the end of 1893 and until the end of February 1894, thus after Vaillant's execution, he was hospitalised for a few months after learning he had contracted a venereal disease. During this hospitalisation, Caserio was likely visited by a number of anarchists—particularly Ernest Saurel—a Sète companion who served as his translator and interface with French speaking anarchists, and Tiburce 'Crispi' Straggiotti, an Italian companion now based in Lyon. According to other patients in the hospital, Caserio often spoke of Ravachol and Vaillant, presenting them as martyrs for the anarchist cause. He was discharged from the hospital at the end of February 1894.

=== Assassination ===
==== Premices ====
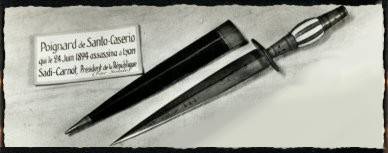
Caserio's dagger, featuring the inscriptions 'Toledo' (like the Spanish city) on one side of the blade and 'Recuerdo' (Remembrance) on the other.

On 23 June 1894, Sante Caserio reported to work but suddenly argued with his employer, despite having been on good terms until then. Around 11:00 AM, he visited gunsmith Guillaume Vaux and purchased a dagger. By 1:30 PM, he arrived alone at the Café du Gard, where he inquired about the schedule and fare for the next train from Avignon to Lyon. Later, he met with Saurel, who later claimed their conversation focused only on Caserio's dispute with Vialla and his plans to seek work in Montpellier.

At 3:00 PM, Caserio boarded a train to Montpellier. Upon arrival, he visited an anarchist named Laborie, leaving around 9:00 PM to catch the 11:00 PM train to Avignon. His activities during the two-hour gap remain unknown. To evade potential surveillance, he changed trains multiple times, arriving in Vienne by morning. There, he met three companions during the morning, all of whom later insisted they discussed only trivial matters.

Caserio then began walking toward Lyon, 30 kilometers away, where Sadi Carnot was scheduled to attend a parade that evening for the Exposition internationale et coloniale (1894)—France's first colonial exposition. His impending act thus aligned with a recurring anticolonial trend within anarchism. Around 3:00 PM on 24 June 1894, he stopped to ask a farmer in Simandres (Isère) for water. An hour and a half later, he passed through Saint-Syphorien-d’Ozon.

==== Attack ====
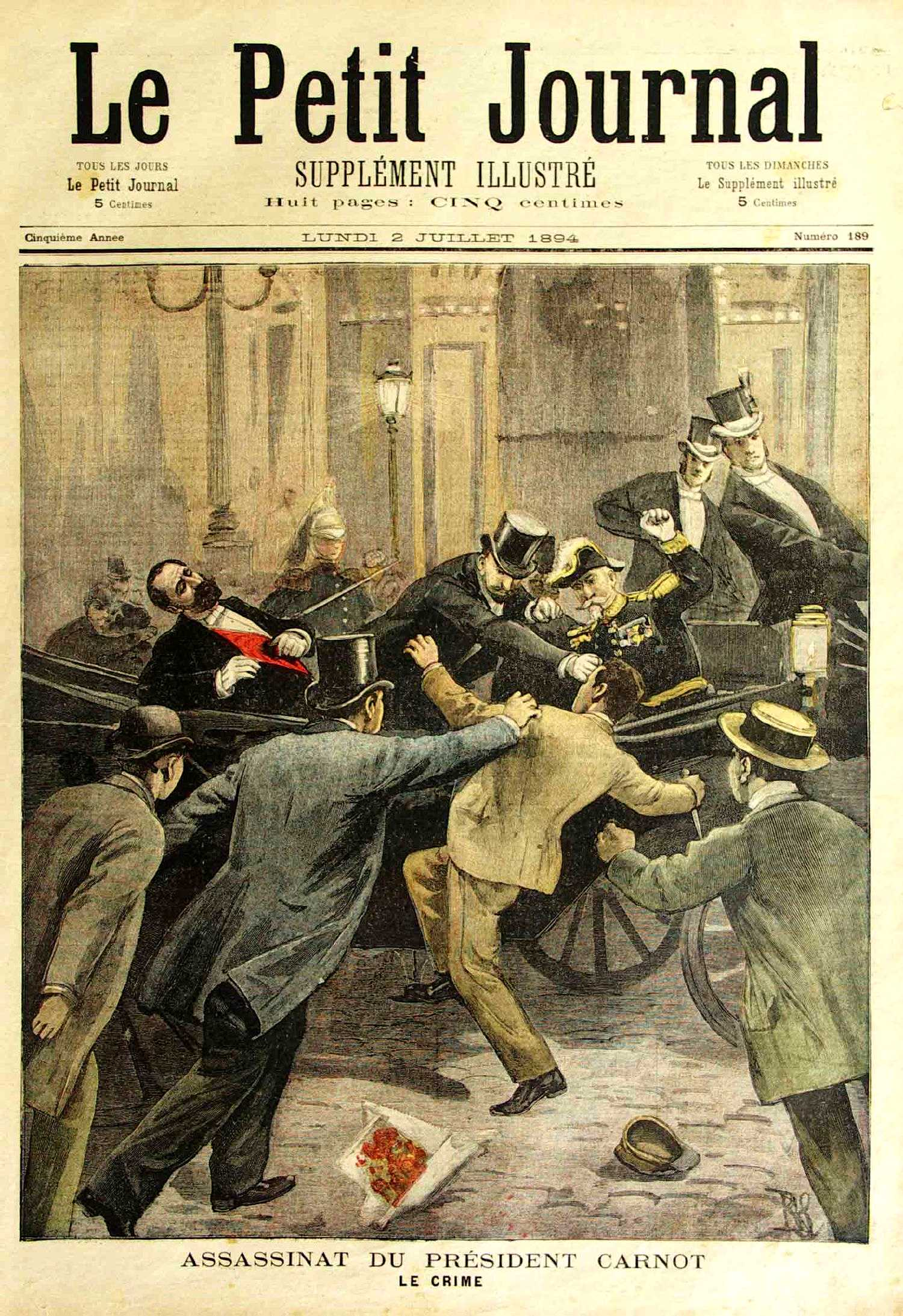
Front page of Le Petit Journal, representing the attack (1894)

From that moment on, he was not seen again until the attack. This is because it is likely that—contrary to what Caserio claimed during his trial—the anarchist has been aided or coordinated with a small group of Lyonnais anarchists to orchestrate his plot.

Shortly before 9:00 PM, Caserio positioned himself along the route of President Carnot's procession at the precise spot where he could assassinate him, namely to the right of the carriage, facing against the direction of movement. The carriage, departing from the Palais du Commerce, entered the street where the anarchist stood, surrounded by a crowd of cheering onlookers.

When the last riders of the escort passed him, Caserio—masked with a cap—pushed the two people in front of him and lunged at the president, the blade of his dagger concealed in a newspaper. He delivered a single, powerful blow with his right hand and shouted, 'Long live the Revolution!' He then fled as the president fell onto his back, losing consciousness. The mayor of Lyon, Antoine Gailleton, initially did not grasp what had occurred, believing someone had thrown a bouquet of flowers at the president.

Caserio nearly escaped but, while shouting 'Long live anarchy!' during his flight, the escort that had overtaken him turned back to apprehend him. He failed to reach the crowd, which closed in around him. The crowd seized him, beating him before police intervened. Meanwhile, Carnot was rushed to Hôtel Dieu hospital. Struck in the liver in two places, he had little chance of survival and died a few hours later on 25 June 1894 around 00:30 AM.

==== Immediate consequences ====
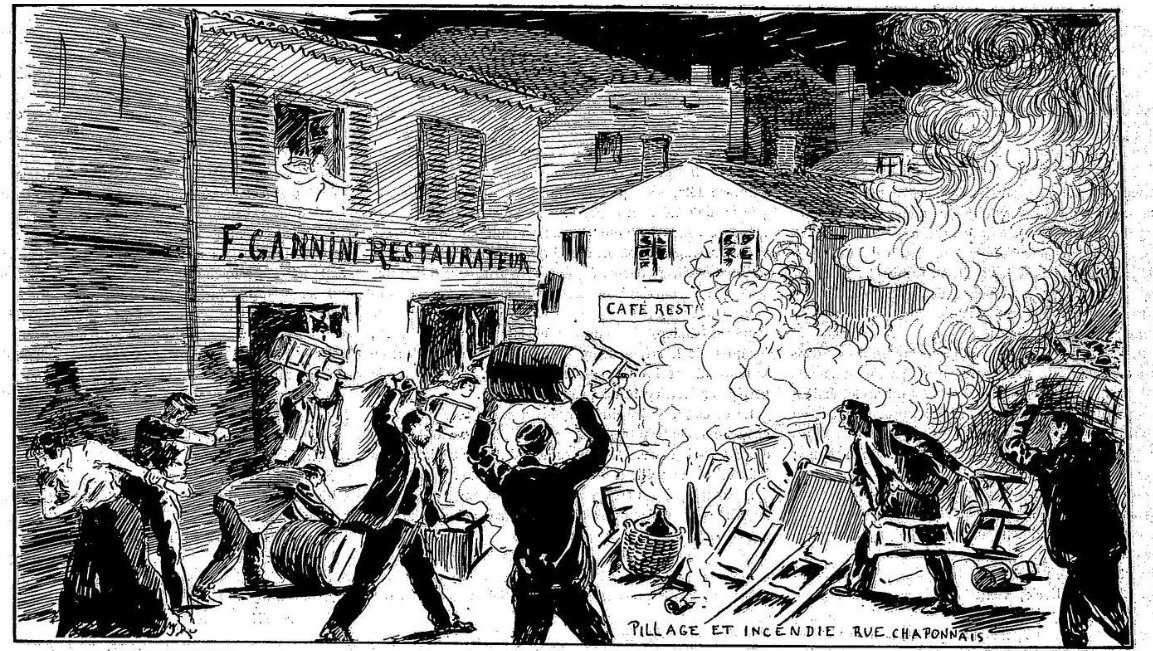
Representation of French anti-Italian riots and plundering following Caserio's act in L'Univers illustré (30 June 1894)

Caserio's act triggered significant xenophobic anti-Italian riots in Lyon as soon as the public learned of the president's death and the assassin's identity. On the evening of the attack, gathering places of Italians in Lyon were targeted, the consulate was stormed, and had to be protected by overwhelmed police forces due to the scale of ethnic violence. In the following days, many Italian-owned properties and businesses in the city were looted. The assassination caused profound shock among parts of the French population, who paid tribute to Carnot. However, in the popular unrest following the attack, Italians rather than anarchists were disproportionately targeted. Caserio's act marked the final attack of the Ère des attentats (1892–1894) and remains one of its most notable.

Lyon anarchists, wary of repression, largely avoided openly supporting the attack. Many were swiftly searched, arrested, and later released.

=== Caserio's trial ===
==== Instruction by Judge Henri Benoist ====
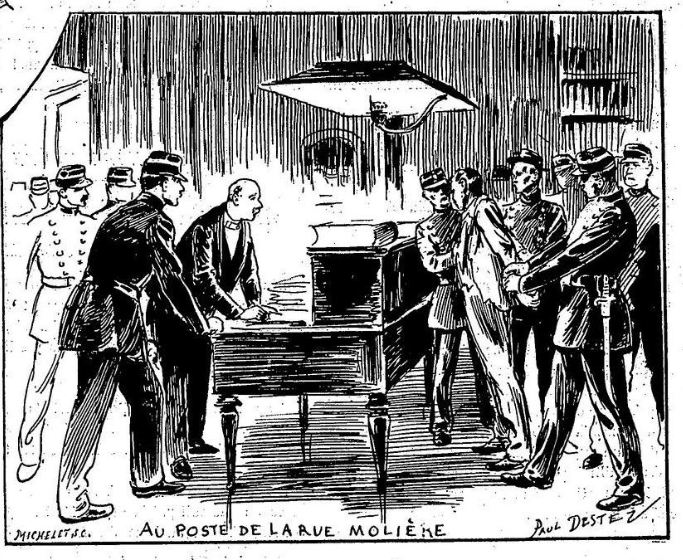
Representation of Caserio at the police post in L'Univers illustré (30 June 1894)

Judge Henri Benoist was tasked with the preliminary investigation almost immediately after the event, on the evening of 24 June 1894. At that time, legal counsel was not yet mandatory during the instruction, which allowed for multiple interrogations. Judge Benoist thus began his work on 24 June 1894 at 11:00 PM and finished on 16 July, a total of 3 weeks, conducting 9 one-on-one interrogations of Caserio.

He denied knowing any anarchists in France, whether in Sète, Lyon, or Vienne. He spoke of his journey from Italy but refused to address questions about potential ties to other militants. Strangely, during pre-trial confrontations, Guillaume Vaux, who allegedly sold the dagger used in the attack, stated he did not recognize Caserio and claimed the purchaser was not the same person. Vaux also asserted the dagger had been bought the day before, not by Caserio, and in the evening. Caserio disputed this testimony and provided a relatively accurate description of the interior of Vaux's gunshop, eventually prompting Vaux to accept his account. The judge largely overlooked significant investigative leads, hastily dismissing and expediting the inquiry to bring Caserio to trial as quickly as possible. For instance, a soldier imprisoned for insubordination, who was hospitalized in February 1894 alongside Caserio, claimed to have overheard him planning the attack on Carnot with Saurel. The two allegedly discussed how a bomb would not be the most effective method to kill their target and instead considered striking during the colonial exhibition scheduled months later—a claim Caserio vehemently denied. However, the judge paid little attention to this testimony, likely dismissing it as a rumor aimed at securing a reduced sentence, and set it aside.

==== Trial ====
Caserio's trial opened on 2 August 1894, presided over by Judge Breuillac, who began the proceedings with a biased declaration against the accused. Berthoud highlights Caserio's responses during the trial, in which he stated he targeted Carnot both as representing the state and bourgeois justice and as personally responsible for repressive policies. For instance, Caserio declared:

—I don’t know whether Mr. Carnot was rich or not. What I know is that he represented the entire bourgeois society, the entire bourgeois justice system. And if he gave charity to the poor, he did so with money given to him through taxes paid by those who work.
—Did you think, when striking this man amid the crowd’s exclamations, of his wife and children, who loved him dearly?
—I did not think of Mr. Carnot’s wife and children, since he, too, did not think of the wives and children of the thousands of anarchists who were arrested, nor of Vaillant’s daughter.

Caserio invoked Vaillant's daughter, Sidonie Vaillant at other times during the trial. He also claimed to be avenging the executions of Émile Henry and Ravachol. The anarchist fully admitted to the attack and refused to discuss potential ties to other anarchists, insisting he acted alone. He clashed with his defense attorney, who attempted to portray him as psychologically unstable and thus criminally irresponsible—a strategy Caserio rejected, asserting he was fully accountable and motivated by political reasons.

He had little chance of avoiding the death penalty, the trial's one-sided and rushed nature was noted by observers like Henri Varenne. Caserio was sentenced to death the following day after just twenty minutes of deliberation. His attorney filed a procedural appeal, citing the judge's biased opening remarks, but it was denied. As he was led out of court, Caserio shouted, 'Long live anarchy'.

==== Caserio's execution ====
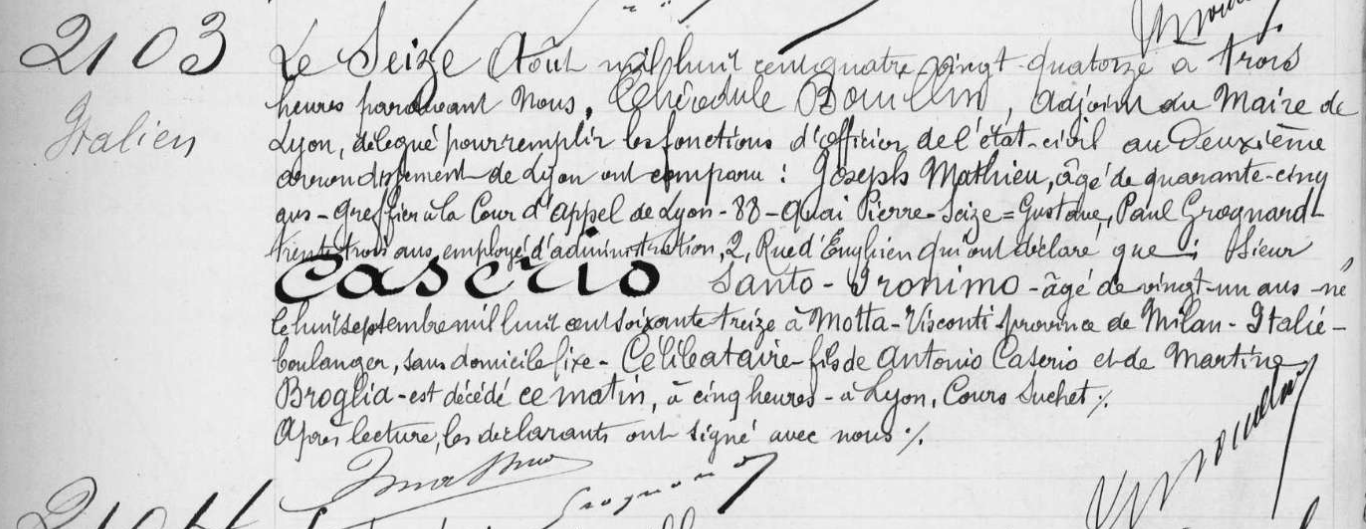
Sante Caserio's death certificate, Archives municipales de Lyon, 16 August 1894

Caserio refused to sign a request for a pardon or an appeal to the Court of Cassation. He still was awaiting his execution with anxiety. On 9 August, he signed a document declaring he did not wish to donate his body to science—a way to avoid the fate of Émile Henry, whose corpse was mocked by doctors during his autopsy. The anarchist also rejected visits from the priest of Motta-Visconti, who came to see him in prison. On 15 August, Caserio wrote his final text, addressed to his sister:

Here are my last written words, dear sister, that I can send you. When you read these final lines, my head will have fallen under the guillotine! Do not believe those who call me an assassin, but know that I die for a great ideal.
Today you are young, but the day will come when you will be forced to fight against misery, and then you will know why your brother died!

The next morning, around 4:30 AM, he was awakened by guards, once again refused religious assistance, and was led to the guillotine without uttering a word. Upon reaching the scaffold, he spoke a few words in Italian—either 'Long live anarchy' or 'I do not want'—before being executed. His head fell into the basket at the base of the guillotine as the gathered crowd applauded, a rare occurrence at such events. Upon learning of his death, Caserio's older brother, Giovanni, committed suicide.

== Bibliography ==
- Accoce, Pierre (1998). "« Ils ont eu Sadi Carnot ! »" [They got Sadi Carnot!]. Ces assassins qui ont voulu changer l'Histoire (in French). Paris: Plon. ISBN 978-2259189873.
- Berthoud, Joël (1969). L'attentat contre Carnot et ses rapports avec le mouvement anarchiste des années 90 (mémoire) [The attack on Carnot and its relationship with the anarchist movement of the 1890s (thesis)] (PDF) (in French).
- Bouhey, Vivien (2008), Les Anarchistes contre la République [The Anarchists against the Republic] (in French), Rennes: Presses universitaires de Rennes (PUR)
- Chambost, Anne-Sophie (2017), "« Nous ferons de notre pire… ». Anarchie, illégalisme … et lois scélérates" [«We’ll Do our Worse». Anarchy, Illegalism … and Evil Law], Droit et Cultures (in French), 74 (2): 65–87, doi:10.4000/droitcultures.4264
- Collectif (Association française pour l'histoire de la justice) (1995). L'Assassinat du président Sadi Carnot et le procès de Santo Ironimo Caserio (in French). Presses universitaires de Lyon. ISBN 978-2-7297-0520-6.
- Eisenzweig, Uri (2001). Fictions de l'anarchisme [Fictions of anarchism] (in French). France: C. Bourgois. ISBN 2-267-01570-6.
- Harismendy, Patrick (1993). "L'assassinat du président Sadi Carnot à Lyon (24 juin 1894)". In Garnot, Benoît (ed.). Ordre et délinquance de l'Antiquité au xxe siècle (in French). Éditions universitaires de Dijon. pp. 357–365.
- Harismendy, Patrick (1995). Sadi Carnot : l'ingénieur de la République (in French). Paris: Perrin. ISBN 978-2-262-01102-4.
- Jourdain, Edouard (2013). L'anarchisme [Anarchism] (in French). Paris: La Découverte. ISBN 978-2-7071-9091-8.
- Jourdain, Edouard (2018), Anarchisme et colonialisme [Anarchism and colonialism] (in French), Réfractions, pp. 135–149
- Locard, Edmond (1954). Le Crime inutile (affaire Caserio) (in French). Paris: Éditions de la flamme d'or.
- Maitron, Jean (1955), Histoire du mouvement anarchiste en France (1800-1914) (in French), Paris: Histoire du mouvement anarchiste en France, 1880-1914
- Merriman, John M. (2016). The dynamite club: how a bombing in fin-de-siècle Paris ignited the age of modern terror. Yale University Press. ISBN 978-0-300-21792-6.
- Piarotas, Mireille (2000). Regards populaires sur la violence [Popular looks at violence] (in French). Saint Etienne (France): Presses Universitaires de Saint-Etienne (PUSE). ISBN 978-2862721804.
- Salomé, Karine (2012). Je prie pour Carnot, qui va être assassiné ce soir (in French). Paris: Vendémiaire. ISBN 978-2-36358-023-8.
- Truche, Pierre (1994), L'anarchiste et son juge: À propos de l'assassinat de Sadi Carnot, Paris: Fayard, ISBN 2-213-59278-0
- Vayre, Pierre (2010). "Assassinat de Marie-François-Sadi Carnot à Lyon, le 24 juin 1894 : défi chirurgical et gageure politique d'un martyre". E-mémoires de l'Académie nationale de chirurgie (in French): 22–31.
- Vincent, Karelle (1999). "Le régicide en République. Sadi Carnot, 25 juin 1894 – Paul Doumer, 6 mai 1932". Crime, histoire et sociétés (in French). 3 (2): 73–93. doi:10.4000/chs.891.
- Ward, Colin (2004). Anarchism: A Very Short Introduction. Oxford University Press (OUP).
- Zancarini-Fournel, Michelle (2016). Les luttes et les rêves (in French). Paris: Éditions La Découverte. ISBN 978-2-35522-088-3.
- Zévort, Edgar (1901). Histoire de la Troisième République, 1879–1901 (in French). Vol. IV. Paris: F. Alcan.
