= National Assembly bombing =

1893 anarchist bombing in Paris, France

- Representation of the National Assembly bombing in Le Monde illustré (16 December 1893)
- Location: 48°51′43″N 2°19′06″E; Paris, France
- Date: 9 December 1893
- Attack type: bombing
- Deaths: 0
- Injuries: Probably dozens of lightly injured, including Vaillant
- Perpetrators: Auguste Vaillant; Marguerite Wapler (financed); Unknown illegalist
- No. of participants: 3?
- Motive: Anarchism; Revenge for Ravachol being executed Struggle against poverty
- Verdict: Death sentence
- Convicted: 1

The National Assembly bombing was a bomb attack carried out on 9 December 1893 in Paris by the anarchist militant Auguste Vaillant. Acting in reaction to other events of the Ère des attentats, literally, "Era of Attacks", (1892–1894), such as the execution of Ravachol, the militant carefully prepared a bomb and managed to enter the galleries of the French National Assembly. He then threw it towards the deputies but was hindered by the arm of another spectator, which caused his attempt to fail. The bomb exploded, killing no one but slightly injuring several people – including Vaillant himself. The session at the National Assembly continued without interruption after the attack, while Vaillant was arrested later that day.

Although the attack was a failure, it illustrated the opposition of anarchists to the French Republic and triggered two kinds of developments. On the one hand, the political authorities used it to push for the rapid adoption of the first two lois scélérates ('villainous laws') in December 1893. The first targeted press freedom, creating the category of incitement to terrorism and undermining the presumption of innocence. The second concerned criminal associations, making any terrorist project punishable, even if the act was not committed. On the other hand, the passing of the lois scélérates and the execution of Vaillant only heightened tensions during this period, pushing Émile Henry and Désiré Pauwels to commit their attacks in revenge – since Vaillant had become a martyr among anarchists. French President Sadi Carnot, who refused to grant his pardon to Vaillant, was assassinated a few months later.

The French press, particularly Le Petit Journal, seized upon the affair to delegitimize the actions of the anarchist and reinforce the republican narrative of the events. This bombing, along with other attacks during the Era of Attacks, marked an early shift in terrorist strategy: instead of targeting specific individuals, it focused on symbolic locations—in this case, the National Assembly as a stand-in for a precise human target. This shift became a hallmark of modern terrorism but was poorly understood by contemporaries.

== History ==
=== Context ===
In the 19th century, anarchism emerged and took shape in Europe before spreading. Anarchists advocated a struggle against all forms of domination perceived as unjust including economic domination brought forth by capitalism. They were particularly opposed to the State, seen as the organization that legitimized these dominations through its police, army and propaganda.

In France, relations between the authorities and anarchists grew tense due to the severe repression that anarchists faced in the 1880s. After the Fourmies massacre and the Clichy affair (1891), a number of anarchists in France decided to engage in terrorist actions against those they held responsible for the repression they endured, launching the Era of Attacks (1892–1894). One of the first terrorists of this period, who targeted the magistrates involved in the Clichy affair, François Koenigstein (Ravachol), was arrested and sent to the guillotine on 11 July 1892, transforming him into a martyr and hero of the anarchist cause.

Meanwhile, Auguste Vaillant, who was then in Argentina trying to start a new life after working as a miner in French Algeria, returned to Paris in 1883, where he settled in Montmartre. He married and had a daughter, Sidonie Vaillant. Vaillant worked as a leatherworker in Saint-Denis. He was earning twenty francs a week, which was insufficient to feed his family and risked plunging him back into poverty. During this period, he became an anarchist by attending discussion groups and began planning his attack.

=== Preparation ===
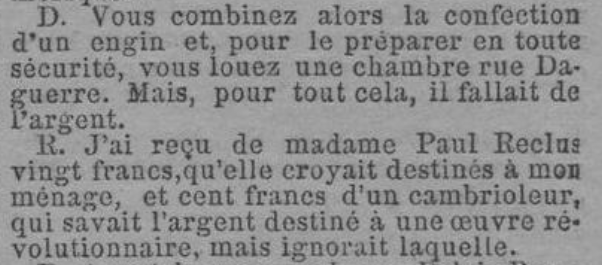
Vaillant arguing that Marguerite Wapler gave him money only for his family and not to support the bombing, Gil Blas, 12 January 1894

Bouhey considers Vaillant to be one of the most meticulous terrorists of the Era of Attacks. Indeed, he acted very methodically to procure the explosive materials. He rented a room at the Hôtel Univers in addition to the one he occupied in Choisy-le-Roi. In this room, he gradually gathered the materials, purchasing them in small quantities and from different sellers. Bouhey notes that the source of the funds used to buy these materials and rent the room remains unknown. However, Jean Maitron, on the contrary, gives a source: twenty francs would have been given to Vaillant by Marguerite Wapler, the wife of Paul Reclus, one hundred by an illegalist anarchist.

Vaillant then visited the French National Assembly several times to conduct reconnaissance of the location.

=== Bombing ===
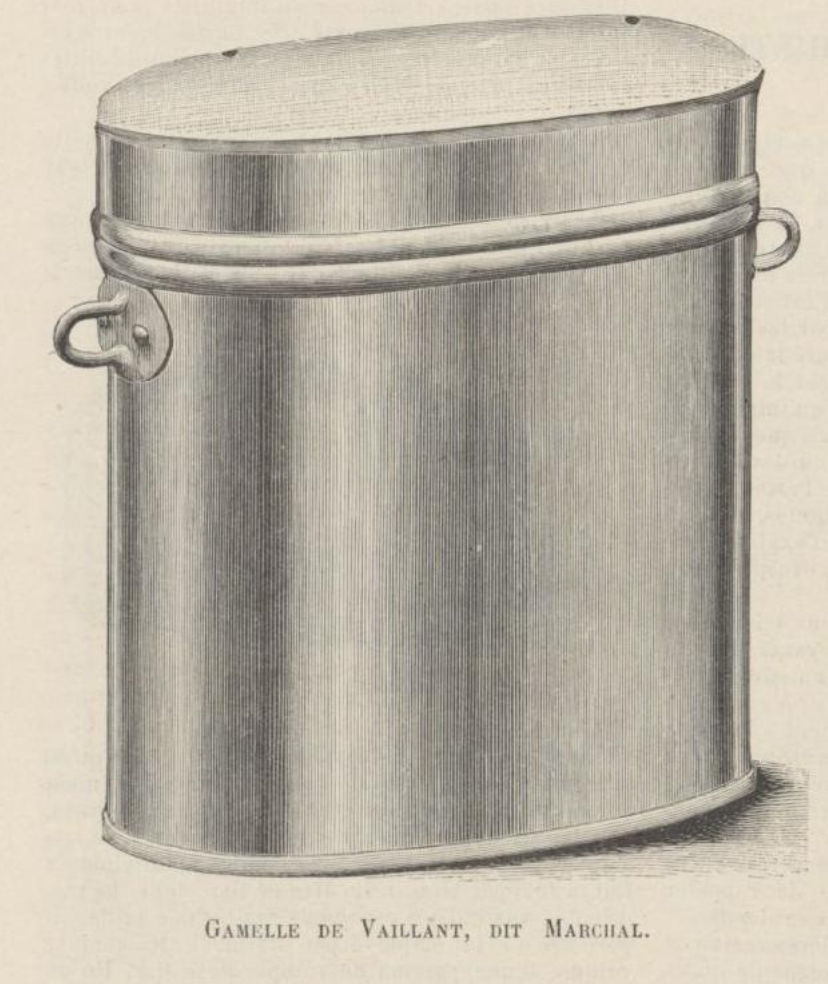
Depiction of the bomb used in the National Assembly bombing in Le Monde Illustré (16 December 1893)

On 9 December 1893, the militant finalized his plot; he completed the bomb by placing it in a small iron box and took it with him as he went to the National Assembly. According to Merriman, the device was not designed to kill but rather to injure. There, he managed to evade security by keeping the bomb concealed under his belt. He then sat down in the gallery in the early afternoon and watched the debates. During this session, presided over by Charles Dupuy, the deputies were debating the validity of the election of socialist deputy Léon Mirman following accusations regarding how he had fulfilled his military service. As Mirman descended from the rostrum to the applause of the left-wing benches, Vaillant stood up and threw his bomb toward the deputies.

The trajectory of his arm was hindered by another spectator, causing it to be thrown with less force than intended. It exploded, unleashing a hail of projectiles that struck the audience, killing nobody and lightly injuring the clerks, the deputies, a priest, and Vaillant himself. At this point, a wave of panic seems to have started in the Assembly, but Dupuy did not move and, after a brief moment, decided to resume the session. Meanwhile, Vaillant managed to escape in the chaos.

=== Aftermath ===
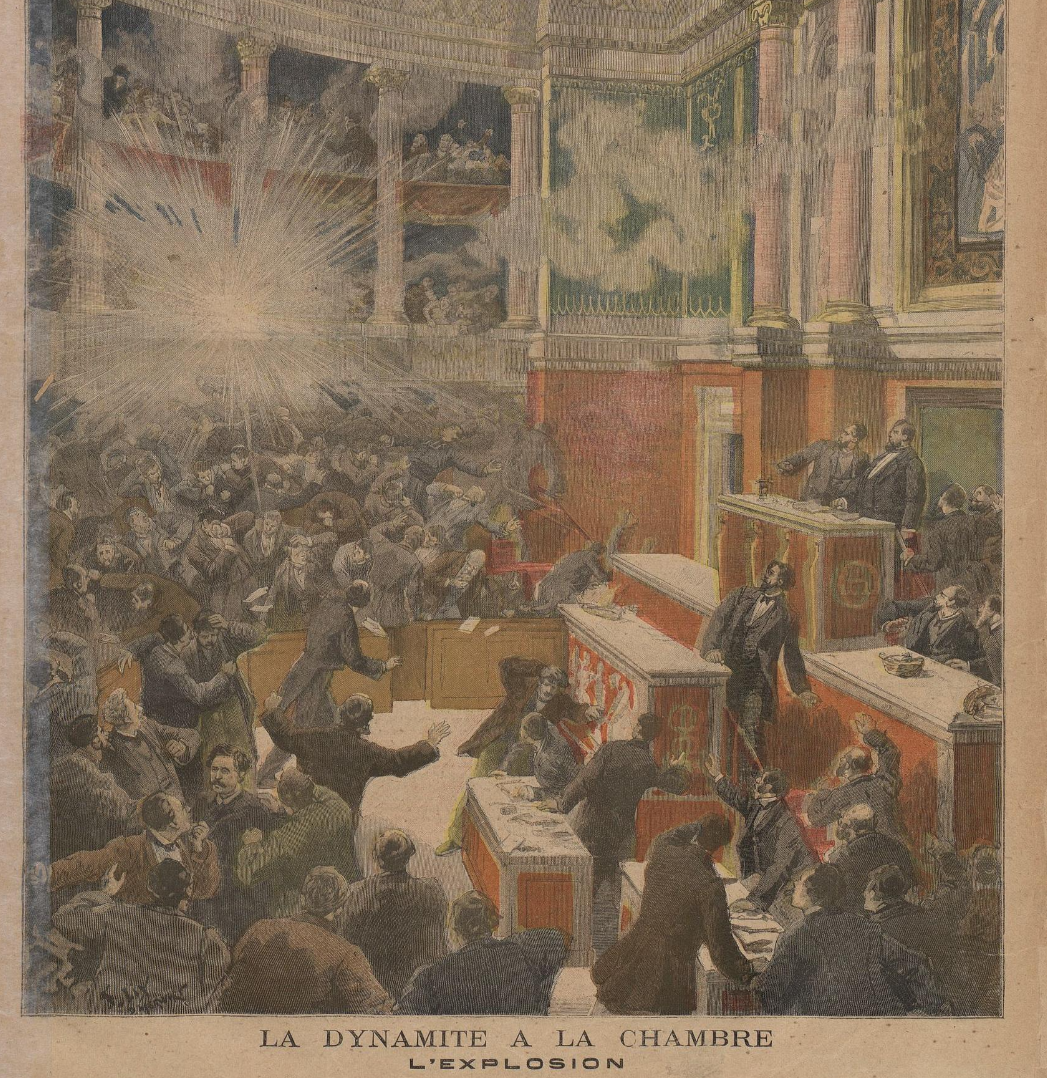
Representation of the National Assembly bombing in Le Petit Journal (23 December 1893)

He was arrested later that day when he presented himself at the Hôtel-Dieu to be treated. There, the hospital staff noticed powder on his hands and informed the police, who came to arrest him without any resistance on his part.

His attack served as political justification for the French Third Republic to push through the adoption of the first two lois scélérates ('villainous laws') on 12–18 December 1893. Anne-Sophie Chambost described these political reappropriations as follows:

The 'marmite' of Vaillant on 9 December 1893 intensified repression to such an extent that the laws seemed to be the result of a politically opportunistic exploitation, which mistreated the principles of criminal law (presumption of innocence and the principle of proportionality of sentences). In order to exclude anarchist propaganda from the scope of press law (which was relatively liberal), the law of 12 December 1893 amended the law of 29 July 1881 in its Articles 24, 25, and 49 (creating the offense of glorifying acts deemed to be crimes, to target direct and indirect provocations; increasing penalties for provocations that did not lead to action; removing certain restrictions from the 1881 law regarding seizures and preventive arrests); the law of 18 December 1893 amended Article 265 of the Penal Code (associations of wrongdoers) to prosecute any form of agreement made to prepare or commit attacks on people or property (even in the absence of execution).

The political use of the attack was aided by the French press, such as Le Petit Journal, which published a sensationalist depiction of the event aimed at discrediting the anarchist and legitimizing the Republic. Thus, Dupuy, presiding the session is portrayed as stoic, standing tall and undisturbed by the attack, a way of suggesting the strength and stability of republican institutions.

Vaillant was tried a month after his attack, on 10 January 1894. During the trial, the anarchist defended himself by stating that he had intended to strike the representatives of national sovereignty, holding them responsible for poverty. His lawyer, Maître Labori, echoed this sentiment, declaring, 'If deputies do not concern themselves with the unfortunate, the unfortunate concern themselves with the deputies'. The anarchist claimed that he had merely sought to injure the deputies and not kill them – something he allegedly could have done by loading his bomb more heavily. His trial ended with him being sentenced to death.

He was guillotined on 5 February 1894, transforming his figure into that of a martyr for anarchists and inspiring subsequent attacks by Émile Henry or Désiré Pauwels. Sadi Carnot, who refused to grant a presidential pardon to Vaillant, was assassinated a few months later by the anarchist militant Sante Geronimo Caserio. However, it seems that Vaillant's image was embraced by anarchists more for the perceived injustice of his execution rather than for his attack itself.

== Analysis ==
=== Shift in the scope of terrorism ===
The National Assembly bombing, like other attacks during the Era of Attacks (1892–1894) marked the emergence of a terrorist symbolism tied to locations rather than individuals. Karine Salomé writes on this subject:

The ambiguity becomes even more pronounced with anarchist attacks, which were no longer exclusively linked to the presence of the head of state. Instead, they began targeting the homes of individuals from diverse backgrounds, such as magistrates Benoît and Bulot during the bombings on Boulevard Saint-Germain and Rue de Clichy in 1892. They also struck symbolic sites, including the Lobau barracks, the Carmaux Mining Company (initially targeted by the bomb that exploded at the Bons Enfants police station), the Madeleine church, the National Assembly, and the Terminus café. From then on, with the exception of Sadi Carnot’s assassination, anarchist attacks signaled a transition from symbolism centered on individuals—specifically the head of state—to symbolism centered on locations, a shift that contemporaries did not always comprehend.

== See also ==
- Timeline of the Era of Attacks
- Propaganda of the deed

== Bibliography ==
- Bouhey, Vivien (2009), Les Anarchistes contre la République [The Anarchists against the Republic], Rennes: Presses universitaires de Rennes (PUR)
- Chambost, Anne-Sophie (2017), "" Nous ferons de notre pire… ". Anarchie, illégalisme … et lois scélérates" [«We’ll Do our Worse». Anarchy, Illegalism … and Evil Law], Droit et Cultures, 74 (2): 65–87, doi:10.4000/droitcultures.4264
- Jourdain, Edouard (2013). L'anarchisme [Anarchism]. Paris: La Découverte. ISBN 978-2-7071-9091-8.
- Maitron, Jean (1955), Histoire du mouvement anarchiste en France (1800-1914) (in French), Paris: Histoire du mouvement anarchiste en France, 1880-1914
- Merriman, John M. (2016). The dynamite club: how a bombing in fin-de-siècle Paris ignited the age of modern terror. Yale University Press. ISBN 978-0-300-21792-6.
- Piarotas, Mireille (2000). Regards populaires sur la violence [Popular looks at violence]. Saint Etienne (France): Presses Universitaires de Saint-Etienne (PUSE). ISBN 978-2862721804.
- Salomé, Karine (2011), L'Ouragan homicide : L'attentat politique en France au XIXe siècle [The homicidal Hurricane: political assassination in 19th century France], Paris: Champ Vallon / Epoque, ISBN 978-2-87673-538-5
- Salomé, Karine (2021), "Le 9 décembre 1893, attentat anarchiste à la Chambre des députés" [9 December 1893, an anarchist attentat on the House of Representatives], Parlement[S], Revue d'Histoire Politique, 16 (2), Paris: 145–152, doi:10.3917/parl2.hs16.0145
- Ward, Colin (2004). Anarchism: A Very Short Introduction. Oxford University Press (OUP).
