= Marie-Rose Astié de Valsayre =

French women's rights activist

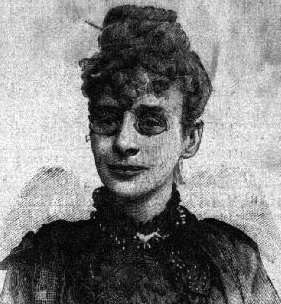
Marie-Rose Astié de Valsayre

Marie-Rose Astié de Valsayre (pen names, Jehan des Etrivières and la mère Marthe; 1846–1915) was a French violinist, feminist, nurse and writer, who is remembered for attempting to overturn legislation prohibiting women from wearing trousers and for a fencing duel she had with an American woman. After studying medicine, she had provided emergency services during the Franco-Prussian War in 1870. In 1889, she created the Ligue de l'Affranchissement des femmes (League of Women's Enfranchisement) calling for women to be added to the electoral lists.

== Early life and education ==
Born in Paris on 30 August 1846, Marie Rose de Valsayre was the daughter of parents who had been ruined by the French Revolution. After her father had emigrated to the United States, she was brought up by her mother. She studied music, first under her mother's guidance, later in the hands of professional tutors. By the time she was 13, she was a competent violinist and was beginning to compose pieces for piano. Unusually for her day, she also studied medicine, allowing her to serve as a nurse in the Franco-Prussian War of 1870.

== Professional life ==
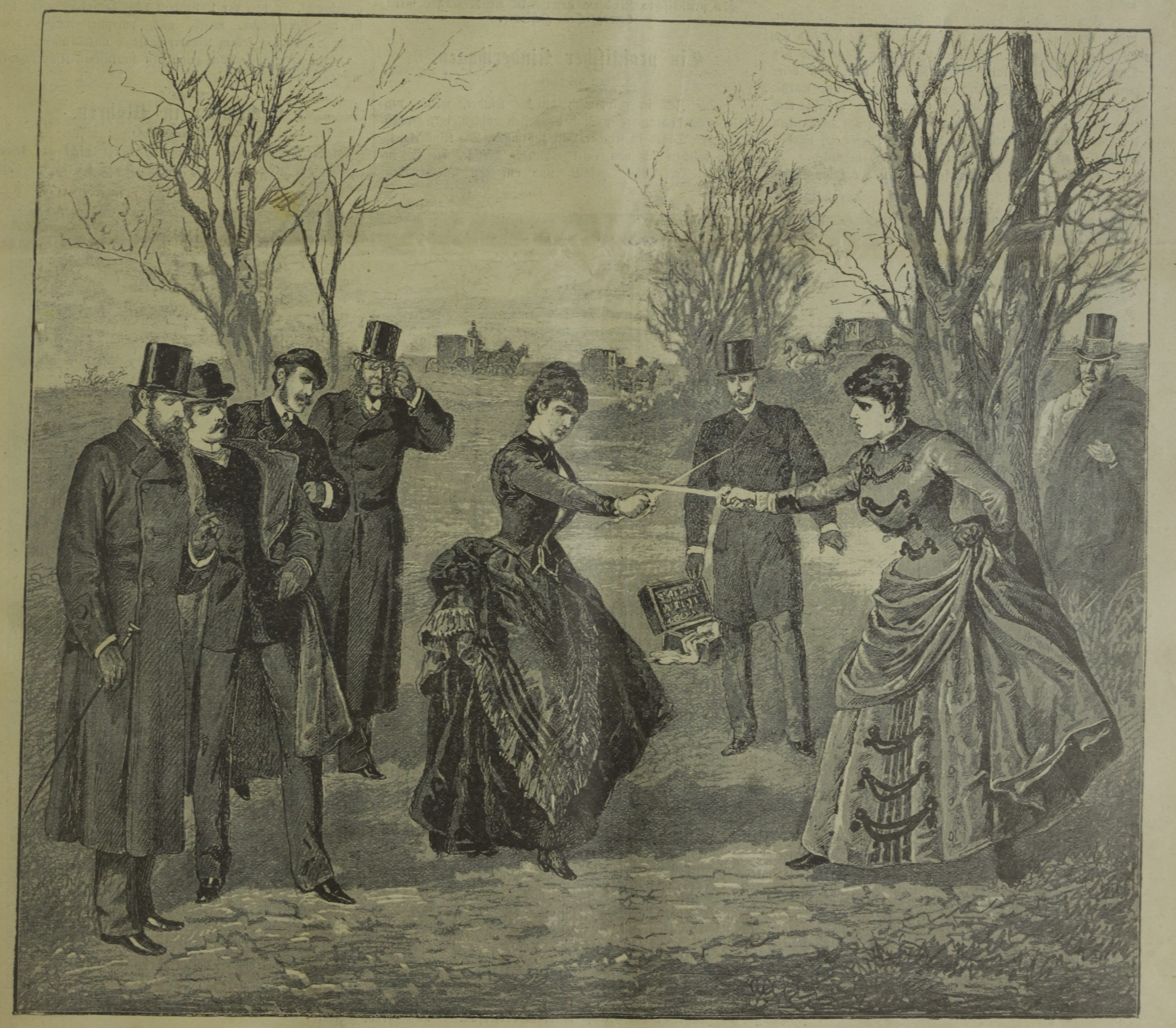
Artist's rendering of the duel between Marie-Rose Astié de Valsayre and Miss Shelby

Astié stood out as a woman who was unwilling to accept the conventions of the times. She rode a bicycle and dressed as a man. As Jehan des Etrivières, in 1882 she published Les Amazones du siècle, ridiculing a number of feminists including Hubertine Auclert, Eugénie Potonié-Pierre and Léonie Rouzade. From 1885, she became a critic on literature and education for La Citoyenne. Under the pen name Jean Misère, she wrote the patriotic Le Retour de l'exilé, telling the story of a Parisian soldier returning from Sedan.

As early as 1880, she began work on a number of feminist issues, including an attempt to overturn legislation preventing women from wearing trousers. In 1886, she sparked a media controversy by duelling another woman, an American, sparked by a debate regarding whether French women doctors or American women doctors were superior. France won the duel, leaving the American, Miss Shelby, slightly injured. This established her, notoriously, as a fencer and duellist. While duels were not uncommon, they were a tradition only of men. Yet Astié went on to establish a women's fencing association.

In 1887, as a delegate for Le Suffrage des femmes, at the congress of the Union fédérative du centre, together with Marie Bonnevial she presented a resolution titled "À travail égal, salaire égal" (For equal work, equal pay).

On 1 July 1887, she sent a petition to the Deputies and the Police Prefecture requesting repeal of the ordinance of 1800, which prevented women from wearing trousers. According to her, bulky women's clothes of the time condemned women to accidents and sometimes death. Her several attempts failed.

In 1889, she ran as a candidate in the municipal elections, and founded the Ligue socialiste des femmes (the Socialist League of Women) and then, in the summer of 1890, the Ligue de l'Affranchissement des femmes (League of Women's Enfranchisement). It set out to fight "all injustices for which women are victimes in all classes of society" and had radical demands: equal pay, access for women to all studies and professions, and women's suffrage. At a well attended public meeting of the League on 3 February 1891, a motion was adopted calling on all theatre directors and newspaper and journal editors to ensure that women's salaries were equal to those for men on the basis of same work, same pay.

In 1892, under the pseudonym "la mère Marthe", she published L'Aisance par l'économie, a practical guide for intelligent working housewives. The same year, with the support of the 6th arrondissement of Paris, she clubbed together with other groups of feminists to establish the Fédération française des sociétés fëministes.

During the repression of January and February 1894 targeting anarchists, Astié de Valsayre offered to care for Auguste Vaillant's daughter Sidonie following his death sentence.

From 1897 to 1901, she directed a newspaper, that she had created, and published many books under the pseudonym "Jehan des Etrivières" until her death in 1915.

== In popular culture ==
Marie-Rose Astié de Valsayre was played by Doria Tillier in the French film Une affaire d'honneur (2023) directed by Vincent Perez and released in English with the title The Edge of the Blade. The action centers around a fictional account of part of her life in the late 1880s.

== See also ==
- Feminism in France
