= 1894 anti-Italian riots =

Ethnic riots in Lyon, France

- Part of Ère des attentats
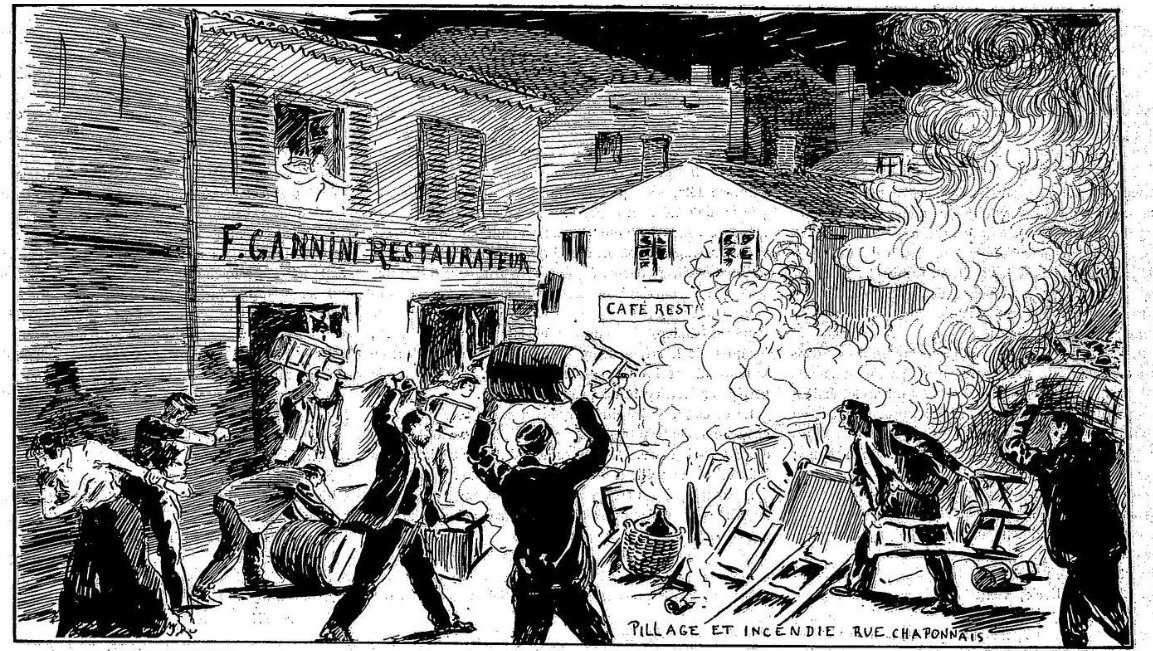
- Representation of the anti-Italian riots in L'Univers Illustré (30 June 1894)
- Date: June 24, 1894 to June 26, 1894
- Location: Lyon
- Caused by: Assassination of Sadi Carnot by Sante Caserio; Italophobia; Anti-anarchist sentiment

Parties
(France) French people	(Italy) Italian people Anarchists

Casualties
- Damage: Dozens of businesses and buildings looted or set on fire in the Lyon metropolitan area

The 1894 anti-Italian riots or the Lyon anti-Italian riots were a series of riots and ethnic violence targeting Italians in Lyon, France, between 24 and 26 June 1894.

Following the assassination of Sadi Carnot by the Italian anarchist Sante Caserio, ethnic violence erupted throughout the Lyon metropolitan area against Italians. The Italian consulate was attacked by a mob attempting to force entry, and dozens of businesses and buildings occupied by Italians were set on fire, looted, and ransacked.

The persecutions led to a "mass exodus" of Italians in several French towns and prompted them to flee France, at least temporarily, to avoid being targeted.

== History ==
=== Context ===
Italians have been a significant ethnic minority in France since a relatively early period. From the 16th century onwards, they faced significant xenophobia from the French; numerous stereotypes about Italians were spread, and they endured several massacres at the hands of French authorities or the population until the 19th century.

In the 19th century, seeking economic opportunities, a number of Italians emigrated to France to find employment, particularly in the Paris region, around Marseille and Cannes, but also in the Lyon region. By the end of that century, approximately 10% of all Italians in France lived there.

A certain number of them subscribed to anarchism, an ideology that searches to fight against all forms of domination, primarily economic domination, with the development of capitalism. Anarchists are particularly opposed to the State, viewed as the institution that supports many of these dominations through its police, army, and propaganda.

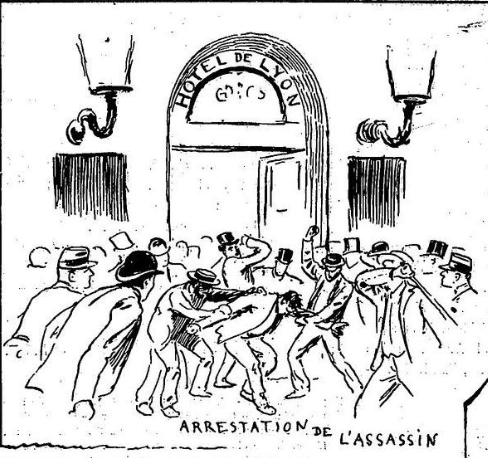
Arrest of Sante Caserio, beaten by the crowd, L'Univers illustré (30 June 1894)

Between 1892 and 1894, during a series of events called the Ère des attentats, one of the Italian anarchist companions, Sante Caserio, assassinated the President of the French Republic, Sadi Carnot, in response to the repression of January and February 1894 and the execution of anarchists like Ravachol, Auguste Vaillant, and Émile Henry. This assassination of the President in Lyon then served as a trigger for ethnic violence targeting Italians in the city and the region.

=== Riots, looting and ethnic violence ===
==== 24 June ====
On the very evening of the assassination, 24 June 1894, young Frenchmen settled on the terrace of Café Casati, at 12 Rue du Bât-d'Argent, and began discussing the attack while profusely insulting Italians. The waiter was insulted and accosted by this group, and as the discussion intensified and he was finally struck, he threw his pitcher at them and then locked himself inside the cafe, which closed its doors to the insults of the growing crowd.

Shortly after, a mob of several hundred people formed in Place de la Bourse and converged on the cafe, with the French flag at its head, joining the already agitated group. The French then attacked the cafe, forced their way in, and ransacked everything they could find.

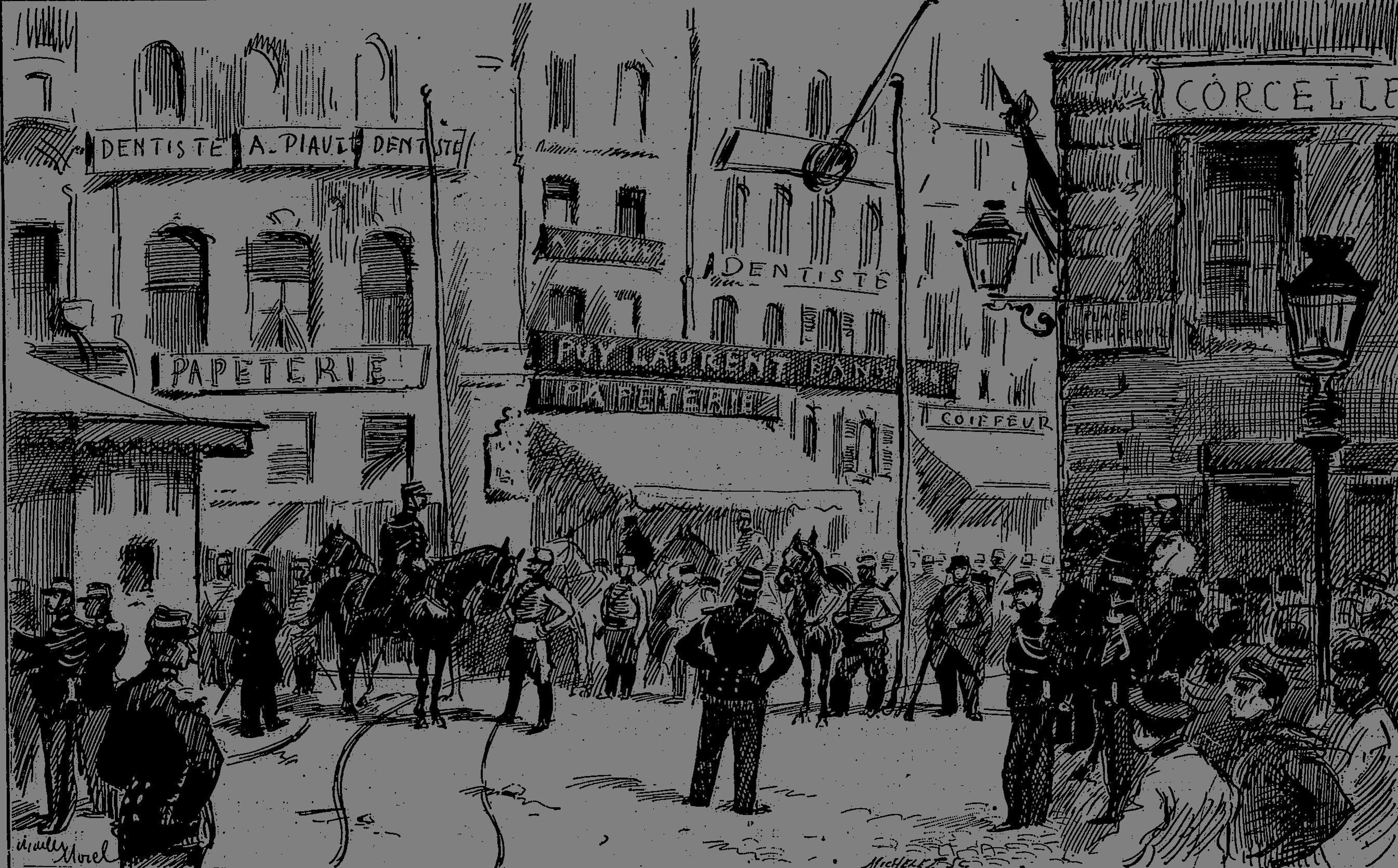
Troops stationed around the Italian consulate, L'Univers illustré (30 June 1894)

Later that evening, the Italian consulate in Lyon was attacked by the Italophobic crowd attempting to break down its gates, shouting "Down with Italy!". This crowd was repelled by the gendarmes and police, before retreating to the Casati restaurant, located in Place Bellecour. There, the demonstrators destroyed the storefront and burned the chairs while singing La Marseillaise. Other businesses, such as grocery stores, were also ransacked and destroyed, though the total number this night did not exceed ten.

==== 25 June ====
The next day, however, was marked by significantly more widespread violence targeting Italians. From midday onwards, several businesses were attacked, and the assaults spread across the entire Lyon metropolitan area. Throughout the day, destruction and looting followed one after another: the Casati bar at the Universal Exhibition was attacked and devastated by a hundred cafe waiters, and the Casartelli bird shop on Quai de l'Hôpital was also ransacked.

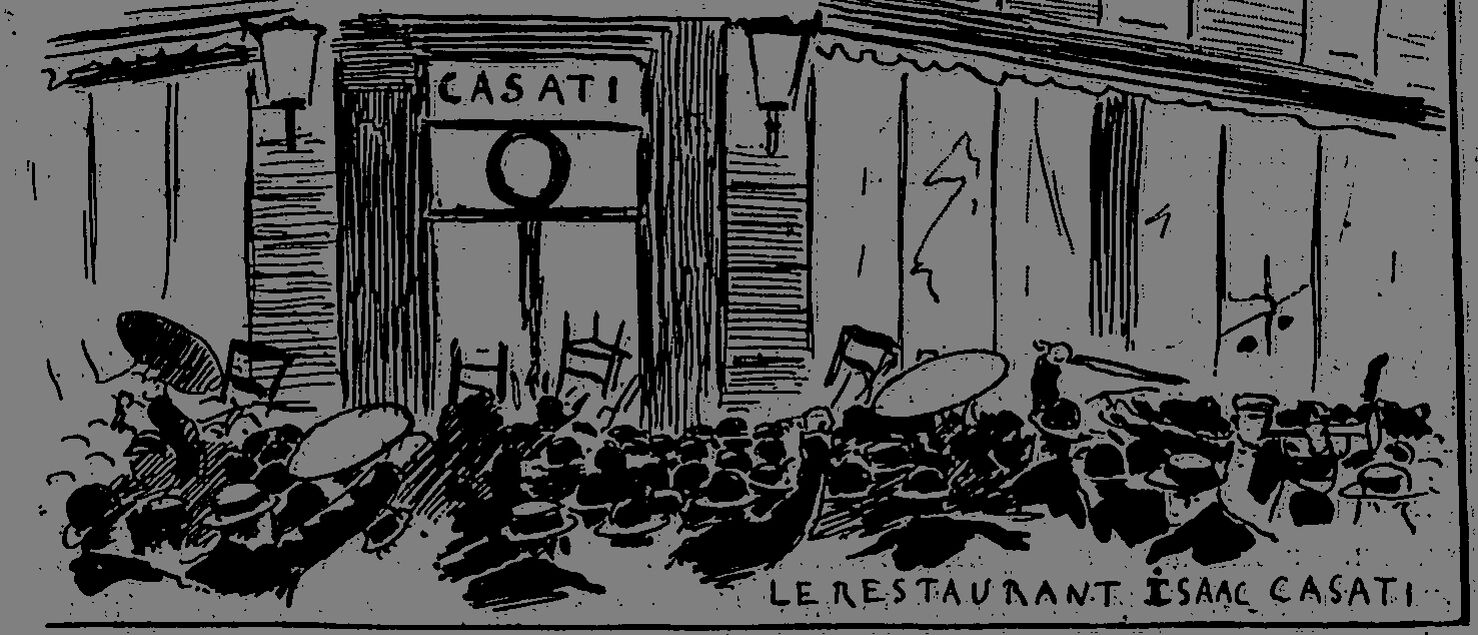
Forced entry and destruction in one of the Casati restaurants/bars, L'Univers illustré (30 June 1894)

The police were overwhelmed by the events and unable to prevent the attacks. The special commissaire of Lyon made numerous calls for reinforcements, and the Ministry of the Interior telegraphed all prefects in France and colonized Algeria to prevent these attacks from spreading to other areas.

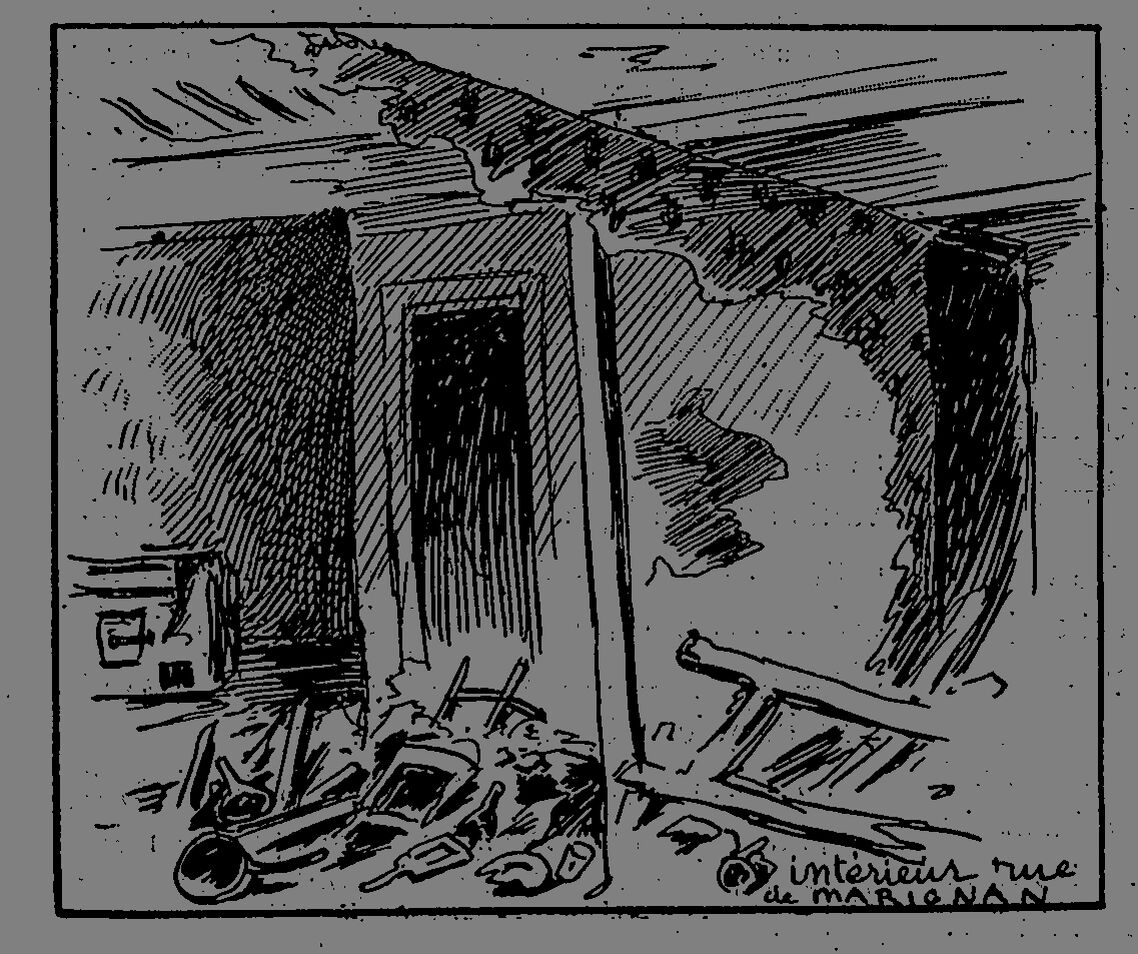
Interior of a ransacked building, rue de Marignan

This was the most significant day in terms of destruction and looting, with thirteen buildings set on fire, including three apartment buildings and ten businesses.

==== 26 June ====
On 26 June, the unrest continued, but with less intensity, and calm returned to the city.

=== Aftermath ===
In the weeks that followed, the French police proceeded with the arrest and imprisonment of a number of individuals, 281 of whom were sentenced to firm prison terms, the longest being two years. Given its slow reaction time, the police arrested suspects whose participation in the incriminated acts was often questionable.

In parallel, Lyon workers' unions initiated strikes to demand the expulsion of Italians from the country. The persecutions led to a "mass exodus" of Italians in certain urban areas and prompted them to flee France, at least temporarily, to avoid further suffering and being targeted themselves.

== Analyses ==
=== Crowd composition ===
According to Joël Berthoud, while the crowd on 24 June 1894 reacted to the assassination and was very clearly nationalistic in its use of symbols and songs, the crowds on subsequent days were less politicized and likely composed of a much larger proportion of individuals motivated by the desire to loot or seize the property of Italians.

== Bibliography ==
- Berthoud, Joël (1969). L'attentat contre Carnot et ses rapports avec le mouvement anarchiste des années 90 (mémoire) [The attack on Carnot and it's relationship with the anarchist movement of the 1890s (memory)] (PDF) (in French).
- Bouhey, Vivien (2008), Les Anarchistes contre la République [The Anarchists against the Republic], Rennes: Presses universitaires de Rennes (PUR)
- Dornel, Laurent (2019), L'anti-italianisme est-il un racisme ? (France, Années 1880-1900) [Is anti-Italianism a racism? (France, years 1890-1900)] (in French), PUBP
- Jourdain, Edouard (2013). L'anarchisme [Anarchism]. Paris: La Découverte. ISBN 978-2-7071-9091-8.
- Tandonnet, Maxime (2019), Droit des étrangers et de l'accès à la nationalité - 2e édition (in French), Paris: Ellipses
- Ward, Colin (2004). Anarchism: A Very Short Introduction. Oxford University Press (OUP).
