= Exposition internationale et coloniale (1894) =

World's fair held in Lyon, France

1894 Lyon
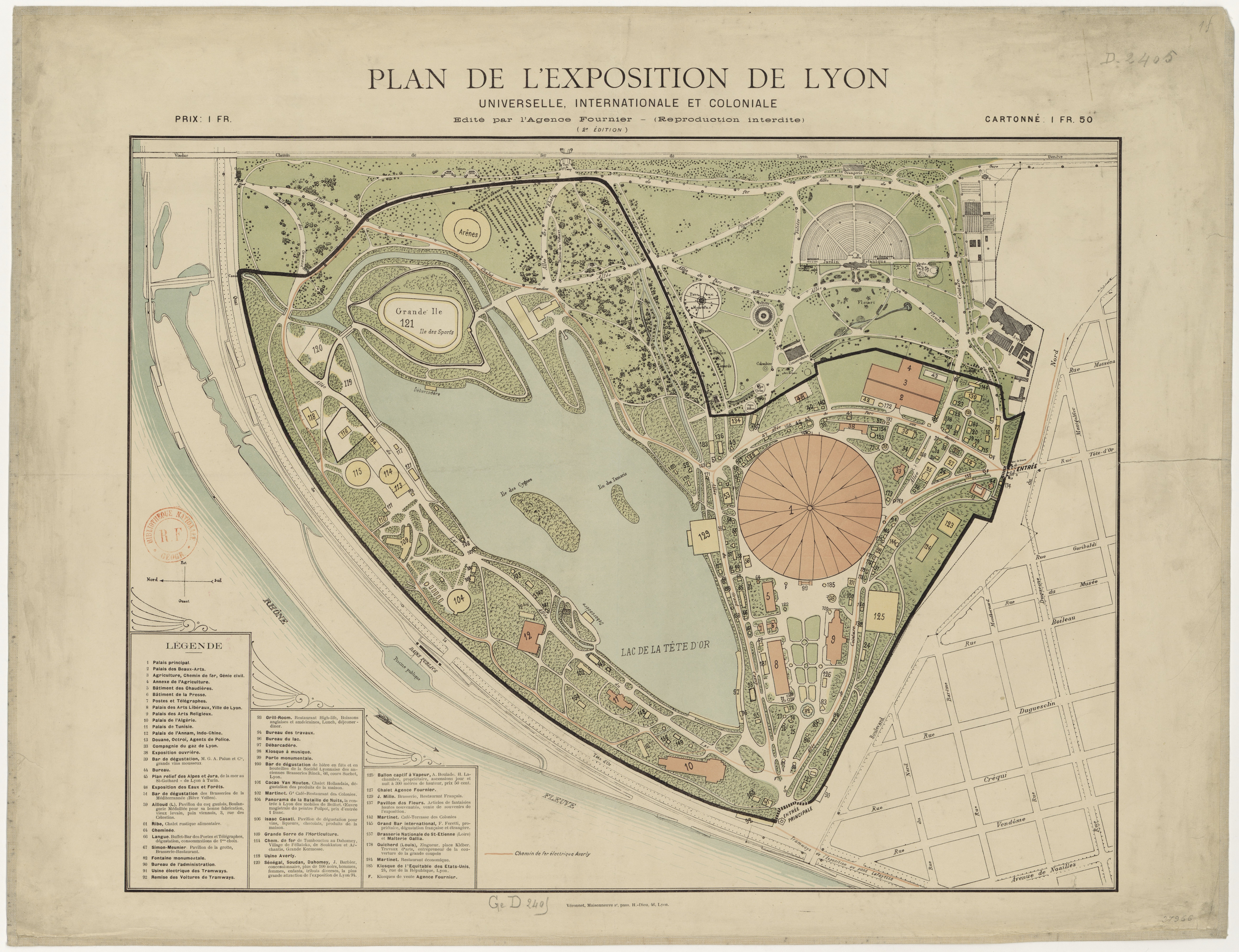
- Plan of the Tête d'Or park

Overview
- BIE-class: Unrecognized exposition
- Name: Exposition universelle, internationale et coloniale
- Visitors: 3.8 million

Location
- Country: France
- City: Lyon
- Venue: Parc de la Tête d'or
- Coordinates: 45°46′35″N 4°51′05″E

Timeline
- Opening: 29 April 1894
- Closure: 11 November 1894

Universal Expositions
- Previous: World's Columbian Exposition in Chicago
- Next: Brussels International (1897) in Brussels

Simultaneous
- Other: California Midwinter International Exposition of 1894

The Exposition universelle, internationale et coloniale was a world's fair including a colonial exhibition held at Parc de la Tête d'or in Lyon, France in 1894. The exposition drew unwanted attention with the assassination of French President Sadi Carnot by the Anarchist Sante Geronimo Caserio, during his visit on 24 June 1894; he died the day after. The exposition drew 3.8 million visitors.

== History ==
The exposition was initially planned as a national exposition to be held in 1892. However, the short interval since the Paris 1889 Universal Exposition led to a postponement of two years and a call for international participation.

Several names were given to the project: "l’Exposition internationale et coloniale de Lyon, en 1894," "Exposition nationale de Lyon en 1894," and "l’Exposition universelle de 1894" before the eventual name "Exposition internationale et coloniale." At the same time, San Francisco and Antwerp organised world's fairs as well.

3.8 million people visited the exposition, and its success led to the renaming of the neighbourhood next to the exposition from Tête d'Or to Tonkin de villeurbanne, thus referring to North Vietnam (Tonkin), at that time part of French Indochina, to satisfy the inhabitants attracted to the exotic colonial atmosphere.

== Organization ==
The main building of the exposition was a 55-metre-high metal dome with a diameter of 242 metres. Several themes got dedicated pavilions:

- Education (palais de l’enseignement)
- City of Paris
- City of Lyon and the surroundings (département du Rhône)
- Faith (palais des arts religieux)
- Economy (palais de l'économie sociale)
- Art
- Agriculture
- Labour
- Railways
- Civil engineering
- Forestry services

French colonies were represented as well in four pavilions:

- Algeria (palais de l’Algérie)
- Tunisia (palais de la Tunisie)
- French Indochina (palais de l’Indochine)
- French West Africa (palais de l’Afrique occidentale).

== See also ==
- Hanoi exhibition, another colonial exhibition, 8 years later, in French Indochina
