= Sidonie Vaillant =

French anarchist

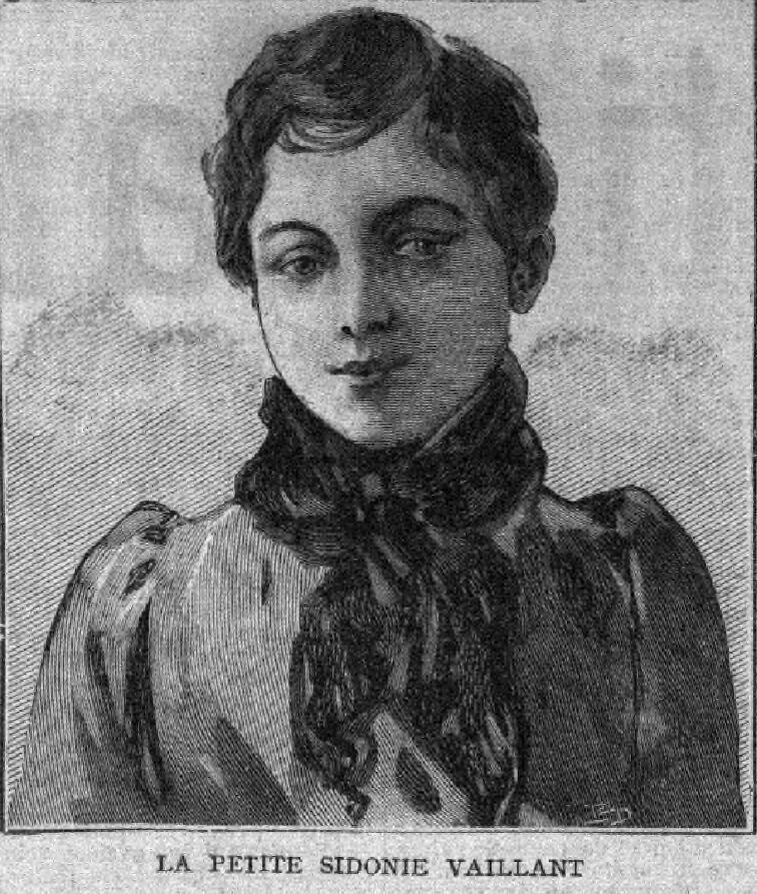
- Sidonie Vaillant in Le Petit Parisien (27 January 1894)
- Born: 9 August 1883; Clichy, Hauts-de-Seine, French Third Republic
- Died: 2 October 1966 (aged 83); Nantes, Pays de la Loire, France
- Occupation: Anarchist
- Known for: Daughter of anarchist Auguste Vaillant; symbolic figure in French anarchist history
- Movement: Anarchism

Sidonie Vaillant (9 August 1883 – 2 October 1966) was a French anarchist activist. She is best known for being the daughter of Auguste Vaillant (1861–1894), an anarchist responsible for the National Assembly bombing. Although the attack killed no one, the family's extreme poverty and Sidonie's young age at the time of the incident stirred part of French society to call on Sadi Carnot to pardon Vaillant. She became involved in writing texts to plead for her father's clemency, including a letter to Cécile Carnot, but to no avail.

Despite the offers from Anne de Rochechouart de Mortemart, Paule Mink and Marie-Rose Astié de Valsayre to care for the young Vaillant, Auguste chose instead to entrust her to Sébastien Faure. He was executed shortly afterward. The Italian companion Sante Caserio assassinated Sadi Carnot in Lyon as an act of revenge for his refusal to respond to Sidonie Vaillant.

She then continued her activism and died in 1966 in Nantes.

== Biography ==
Sidonie Vaillant was born on 9 August 1883, in Clichy. Her mother was named Virginie Viol, and her father, Auguste Vaillant, was first a socialist and later an anarchist activist. The family was very poor, and her father had to support them with his wages. During the Ère des attentats (1892–1894), he found work as a leather worker earning twenty francs a week. In response to this situation, possibly with the help of other anarchists, he carried out the National Assembly bombing on 9 December 1893.

After her father's arrest, the French state enacted the lois scélérates ('villainous laws') and launched a repression in January and February 1894. Her father was put on trial and sentenced to death. She learned of the news upon waking, as she had been asleep when he was condemned. The fact that her father had killed no one, targeted generally unpopular deputies, and only slightly injured his victims sparked a sense of support among the working-class population of Paris.

On 17 January, police raided and arrested anarchist restaurateur Constant Martin, who had been sheltering her for several days – taking advantage of her being away shopping with her adoptive mother.

Sidonie Vaillant's fate, as a young and impoverished girl, moved many people who were touched by her situation. She wrote a letter to the President's wife, Cécile Carnot, in which she wrote, among other things:

Madam, I have been told that you have great power, so I come to you to humbly ask that you do everything possible to obtain my unfortunate father's pardon and sign or have his plea for clemency signed. [...] Madam, I am truly innocent of the things that have happened, but my poor father is a martyr. It hurt me greatly to see him through the bars and not be able to embrace him. Please accept, Madam, my sincere thanks in advance for your sympathy.

The request did not succeed, prompting socialist deputies, joined by Georges Clemenceau, to make the same plea, without success again. Several individuals, including former Communard Paule Mink and feminist activist Astié de Valsayre, offered to take care of her. This was also proposed by the royalist Duchess of Uzès Anne de Rochechouart de Mortemart, who suggested she could look after Sidonie Vaillant. However, he refused and instead entrusted her to Sébastien Faure, which would, at least from 1898 onwards, be involved in various child abuse and child rape cases, targeting young girls approximately her age. The Duchess of Uzès, blamed Faure for this decision and harbored deep resentment toward him thereafter. Mink accompanied her along with her adoptive mother, Madame Marchal, so she could ask to visit her father. This request was granted to both the adoptive mother and Vaillant.

In 1896, she was monitored by the police, who observed her distributing anarchist newspapers such as Les Temps nouveaux for free, along with other children of anarchists. On 16 April 1897, she attended the annual banquet of the League of Propaganda and Atheism, where she shared a pig with around thirty guests.

Faure entrusted her to the Blay couple when he left Paris for Marseille in 1898, but she later studied at La Ruche. Vaillant attended the funeral of Louise Michel on 22 January 1905.

She married Joseph Saint-Ange de Fornier on 10 November 1913, in Paris. Vaillant died on 2 October 1966, in Nantes.

== Legacy and influence ==
Sadi Carnot's refusal to respond to her letter was one of the motives that drove Sante Caserio to assassinate him, which he did by stabbing him to death. Tardif describes this influence as follows:

In reaction to the head of state's indifference to Sidonie Vaillant's request, the anarchist sought to make a political statement by publicly stabbing him during an official visit to Lyon on 25 June 1894.

== Bibliography ==
- Bouhey, Vivien (2009), Les Anarchistes contre la République [The Anarchists against the Republic], Rennes: Presses universitaires de Rennes (PUR)
- Chambost, Anne-Sophie (2017), "« Nous ferons de notre pire… ». Anarchie, illégalisme … et lois scélérates" [«We’ll Do our Worse». Anarchy, Illegalism … and Evil Law], Droit et Cultures, 74 (2): 65–87, doi:10.4000/droitcultures.4264
- Merriman, John M. (2016). The dynamite club: how a bombing in fin-de-siècle Paris ignited the age of modern terror. Yale University Press. ISBN 978-0-300-21792-6.
- Tardif, Marie-Pier (2021), Ni ménagères, ni courtisanes. Les femmes de lettres dans la presse anarchiste française (1885-1905) (PhD thesis) [Neither housewives nor courtesans. Women writers in the French anarchist press (1885-1905)] (PDF)
