= The Edge of the Blade =

- Theatrical release poster
- French: Une affaire d'honneur
- Directed by: Vincent Perez
- Written by: Vincent Perez; Karine Silla
- Produced by: Sidonie Dumas
- Starring: Roschdy Zem; Doria Tillier; Guillaume Gallienne; Damien Bonnard; Vincent Perez
- Cinematography: Lucie Baudinaud
- Edited by: Sylvie Lager
- Music by: Evgueni Galperine; Sacha Galperine
- Production companies: Gaumont; France 2 Cinéma
- Distributed by: Gaumont
- Release date: 27 December 2023 (France)
- Running time: 100 minutes
- Country: France
- Language: French
- Box office: $1.3 million

The Edge of the Blade (French: Une affaire d'honneur) is 2023 French swashbuckling historical drama film directed by Vincent Perez. It is set in the 1880s and follows the feminist swordswoman Marie-Rose Astié de Valsayre who requests the services of renowned fencing master Clément Lacaze to help prepare to defend her honor.

== Cast ==
- Roschdy Zem as Clément Lacaze
- Doria Tillier as Marie-Rose Astié de Valsayre
- Guillaume Gallienne as Adolphe Tavernier
- Damien Bonnard as Ferdinand Massat
- Vincent Perez as Colonel Louis Berchère
- Noham Edje as Adrien Lacaze
- Eva Danino as Marguerite
