= 1887 French presidential election =

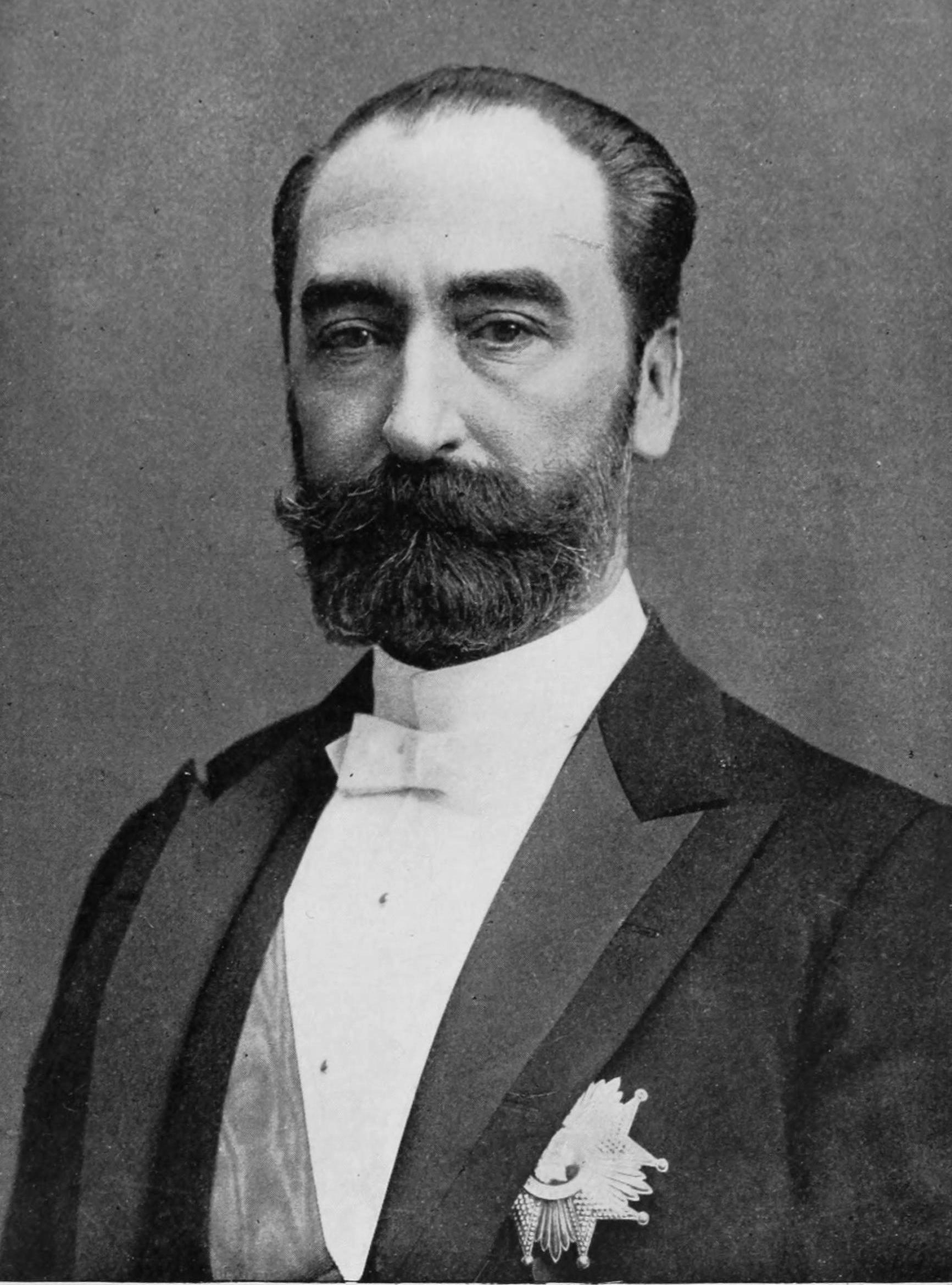

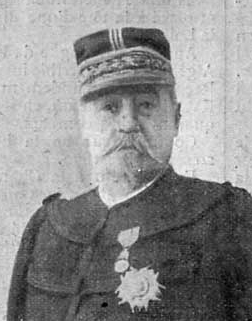
Candidate	Sadi Carnot	Félix Gustave Saussier
Electoral vote	616	188
Percentage	74.49%	22.73%
President before election
Jules Grevy
President after election
Sadi Carnot

Presidential elections were held in France on 3 December 1887, to elect the fourth president of the Third French Republic. The elections were triggered by the resignation of President Jules Grevy.

== Background ==
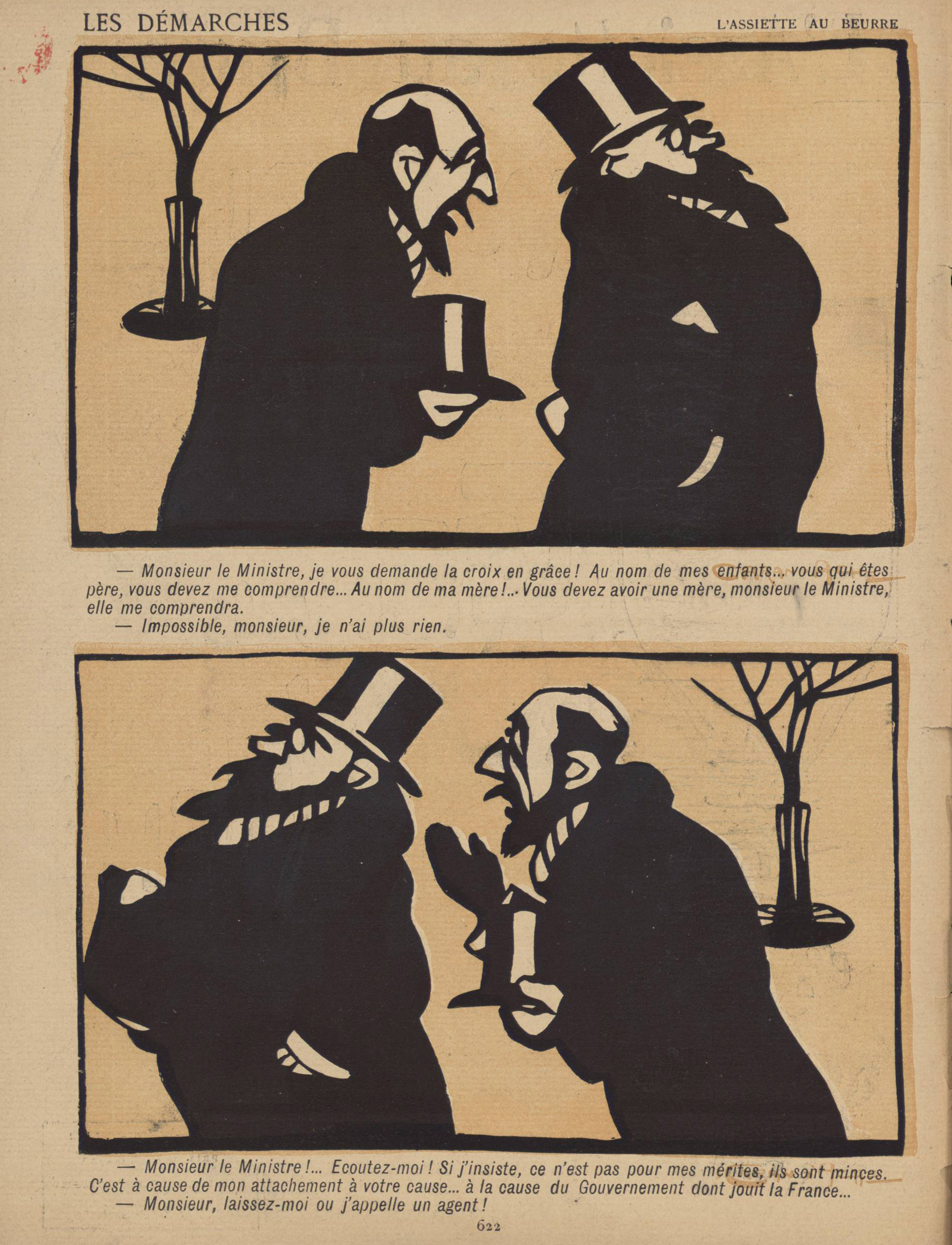

The election was triggered by the resignation of President Grevy, which resulted from the decorations scandal of 1887. This scandal forced Prime Minister Maurice Rouvier into resignation, with no other figure agreeing to be appointed by Grevy as the next prime minister. This caused a government crisis which forced Grevy to resign. The French National Assembly met for a joint sitting on December 3 to elect a new president.

== Election ==
Jules Ferry, the former prime minister, was initially seen as the front-runner in the race due to his name recognition and experience, but the more-left wing Republicans disliked him. The Radicals within the Assembly, led by Georges Clemenceau, backed an outsider in the form of former Finance Minister Sadi Carnot.

Conservative Monarchists within the assembly rallied behind General Félix Gustave Saussier.

On the first ballot, Carnot came in first with 303 votes (35.69%) while Ferry came in second place with just 212 (24.97%). Both had come short of the majority needed. Seeing he had been outflanked, Ferry withdrew from the race and Carnot was easily elected president on the second ballot with 616 votes (74.49%)

== Results ==
Candidate	Party	First round		Second round	
Candidate	Party	Votes	%	Votes	%
Sadi Carnot	Union of the Lefts	303	35.69	616	74.49
Jules Ferry	Democratic Union	212	24.97	11	1.33
Félix Gustave Saussier	Military	148	17.43	188	22.73
Charles de Freycinet	Moderate Republicans	76	8.95	5	0.60
Félix Antoine Appert	Moderate Republicans	72	8.48	5	0.60
Henri Brisson	Republican Union	26	3.06		
Charles Floquet	Radical Left	5	0.59	1	0.12
Anatole de La Forge	Radical Left	2	0.24		
Félix Pyat	Far-left	2	0.24	1	0.12
Louis Pasteur	Independent	2	0.24		
Eugène Spuller	Moderate Republicans	1	0.12		
Total		849	100.00	827	100.00
Valid votes		849	99.65	827	98.22
Invalid/blank votes		3	0.35	15	1.78
Total votes		852	100.00	842	100.00
Registered voters/turnout		852	100.00	842	100.00
Source: MJP Journal officiel
