= Sante Geronimo Caserio =

Italian anarchist and assassin of French president Carnot in 1894

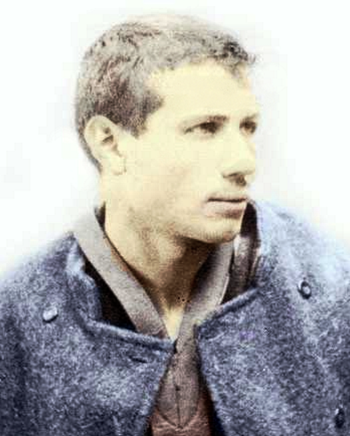
- French police photo of Caserio
- Born: 8 September 1873; Motta Visconti, Italy
- Died: 16 August 1894 (aged 20); Lyon, France
- Cause of death: Execution by guillotine
- Occupations: Baker; Messenger
- Known for: Assassinating French President Marie François Sadi Carnot in 1894
- Movement: Anarchism; Anticolonialism

Sante Geronimo Caserio (Italian: [ˈsante kaˈzɛrjo]; 8 September 1873 – 16 August 1894) was an Italian baker, anarchist, and propagandist by the deed. He is primarily known for assassinating Sadi Carnot, the sitting president of the French Republic, on 24 June 1894. This act marked the final attack of the Ère des attentats (1892–1894) and became a pivotal event in the history of anarchism in France. It was also an anticolonial attack, as Caserio targeted the president during the first French colonial exhibition.

Born into a working-class family, Caserio began working as a baker in Milan at age thirteen. During his adolescence there, he met anarchist militants such as Pietro Gori, who drew him into the Italian anarchist movement. Over time, he became a prominent figure in Milanese anarchist circles and was arrested and imprisoned for distributing anti-militarist leaflets to soldiers. He later escaped his sentence, fled to Switzerland, and then settled in France, where he connected with fellow anarchists. In October 1893, Caserio moved to Sète, mingled with local anarchists, and resumed work as a baker before contracting a venereal disease. During his hospitalization, he engaged in anarchist propaganda and received visits from militants as far away as Lyon.

In June 1894, Caserio seemingly abruptly decided to assassinate Sadi Carnot. He traveled to Lyon and positioned himself precisely along the president's route on the Rue de la République, where he fatally stabbed him. His arrest and the revelation of his identity triggered significant anti-Italian riots in Lyon, leading to the looting of properties owned by Italians, like bars or the Italian consulate of the city.

Caserio fully claimed responsibility for the attack, insisting he acted alone—a claim disputed by modern historians, who argue his act was likely part of a plot orchestrated by a small group of militants. He defended his actions as revenge against Carnot for repressing the anarchist movement in France. Convicted of murder by the Rhône Assize Court on 3 August 1894 after an expeditious trial, he refused to appeal and was guillotined thirteen days later.

== Youth in Italy ==
Towns where Caserio evolved, a good example of the anarchist companionship.

Sante Geronimo Caserio was born on 8 September 1873 in Motta Visconti. He was born into a modest family, the son of Martina Broglia and Antonio Caserio, a laborer who fought for Italy's independence against Austria-Hungary. Caserio was the youngest of five siblings, which included an older sister and three older brothers, the eldest being Giovanni Caserio. One of his sisters died at a young age.

As a child, he was often chosen by his village to portray John the Baptist during Catholic processions. Caserio also served as an altar servant during Mass. He attended school until around the age of ten but stopped due to being deemed 'not very gifted'.

At thirteen, Caserio began working as a baker's apprentice in Milan under Olgiati, who valued him for his skill in breadmaking. He continued working in the bakery for several years.

At eighteen, Caserio met Pietro Gori and Antonio Caspani, prominent Milanese anarchists. Caspani heavily influenced Caserio, who soon embraced anarchist ideals. He began frequenting a Milanese anarchist tavern, where he connected with figures like Ange Mazzini. Before leaving Milan for Paris in early 1892, Caspani entrusted Caserio with his apartment and tasked him with continuing anarchist propaganda.

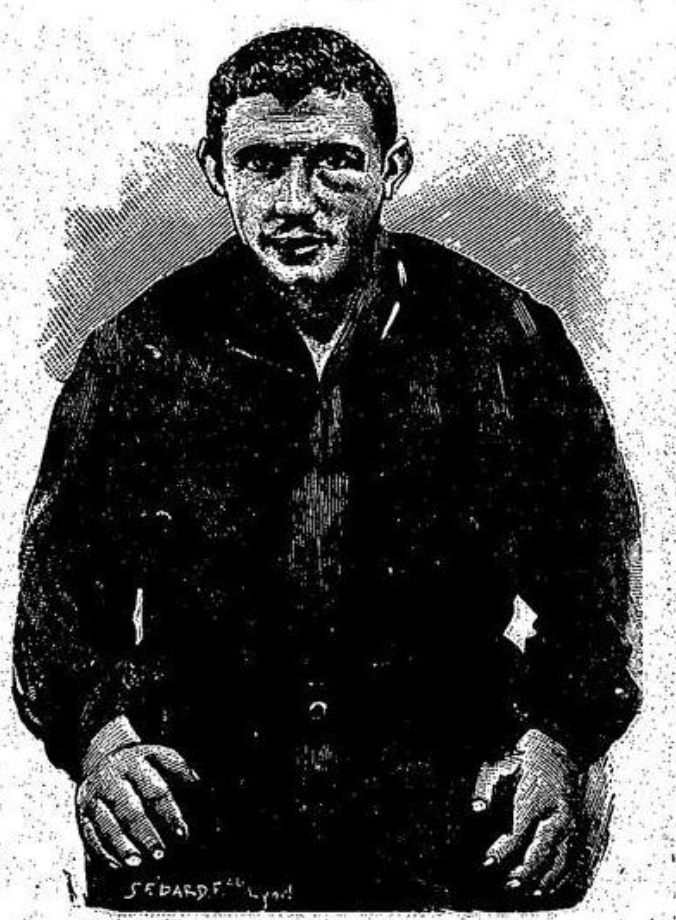
Depiction of Sante Caserio in L'Univers illustré (14 July 1894)

By then a notable figure in Milan's anarchist circles, Caserio was arrested by Italian police on 26 April 1892 for distributing anarchist leaflets to soldiers outside military barracks. A police search of his home uncovered a notebook written by Caspani containing addresses of anarchist contacts in Switzerland (Lugano and Geneva), along with Caserio's own antimilitarist writings. Authorities charged him, and he was defended by Gori during his trial. On 28 November 1892, he was sentenced to eight months and ten days in prison for distributing subversive materials.

Caserio appealed the verdict and was granted provisional release pending a retrial. However, on 26 January 1893, after the mayor of Motta Visconti refused to issue him a passport due to his criminal record, he likely sought help from fellow anarchists companions to obtain a forged passport. Using this, he fled to Switzerland, evading a second sentence of ten months in prison imposed in June 1893.

== Exile and arrival in France ==
Caserio moved to Lugano, Switzerland, and began working as a baker for Bernadoli on 6 March 1893. He was dismissed from this job on 24 June 1893 after participating in a bakers’ strike, which he likely organised. Swiss authorities also grew suspicious of him due to his irregular paperwork. He then travelled to Lausanne, where he stayed with a companion named Maggi. In the second half of July 1893, he crossed the border into France.

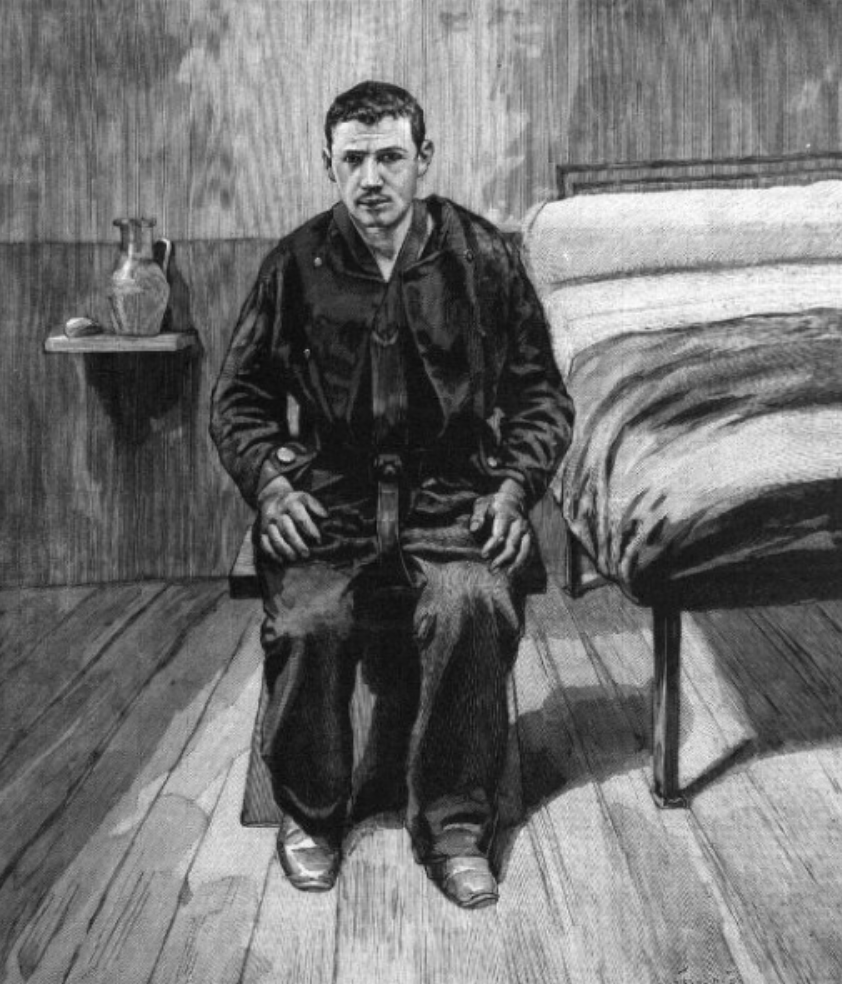
Depiction of Caserio in his jail cell, Le Petit Parisien : Supplément littéraire illustré (15 July 1894)

Arriving in Lyon around 20 July 1893, Caserio initially lodged at 4 rue de Turenne, later moving to boarding houses on rue de la Vierge and rue Pierre Corneille. During this time, he connected with fellow anarchists, including Tiburce Straggiotti (Crispi), who had also been expelled from Italy, as well as a man named Prévost (Bavis) and possibly Marius Debard. Caserio worked as a plasterer for three employers until 9 September 1893. However, as he did not speak French and avoided Lyon's anarchist circles, the French authorities remained unaware of his activities.

On 20 September 1893, he left Lyon for Vienne, where he met several radical anarchists noted by police. Despite their notoriety, Caserio evaded surveillance. He worked briefly as a baker there before departing for Sète in October 1893, later explaining this choice by claiming Sète’s bread resembled the Italian style he knew how to make. In Sète, he was hired by a baker named Vialla, who appreciated his diligence and the fact that he never drank alcohol (though Caserio smoked heavily). He befriended Ernest Saurel, a local anarchist who translated his correspondence, introduced him to other militants, and provided anarchist publications like Le Père Peinard and Le Révolté. His activist background in Italy earned him respect among Sète’s anarchists.

On a personal level, Caserio had read some works by Peter Kropotkin and other anarchist theorists, which he nearly memorized. He also admired Victor Hugo for his depictions of poverty but criticized him for failing to propose solutions. His personality was intensely polarized, wholly dedicated to anarchism. This single-mindedness was evident in his exclusive friendships with fellow anarchists. His letters never mentioned romantic relationships. He never references any woman also, presenting a very masculine perspective. The sole non-anarchist topic he discussed was breadmaking, as seen in an ironic remark about the French production methods of the time:

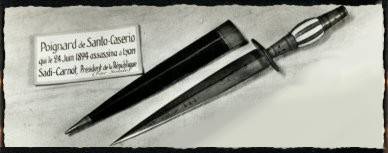
Caserio's dagger, featuring the inscriptions 'Toledo' (like the Spanish city) on one side of the blade and 'Recuerdo' (Remembrance) on the other.

The bread here isn’t made like in Italy. You’d laugh if you saw us working! To prepare a 100-pound dough, they start with just one kilo of sourdough starter. They knead for five hours, adding flour and water bit by bit until the mass reaches its final weight.

In December 1893, Caserio developed severe skin lesions and was hospitalized in January 1894 after being diagnosed with a venereal disease. During his stay, he promoted anarchist ideas to other patients, praising Ravachol and Auguste Vaillant as martyrs for the anarchist cause. He received visits from Saurel, a Sète-based comrade named Parodi, and Straggiotti, who traveled from Lyon. Discharged in late February 1894, his life appears uneventful in surface from there until his assassination of Carnot months later.

== Assassination of Sadi Carnot ==
=== Premises ===
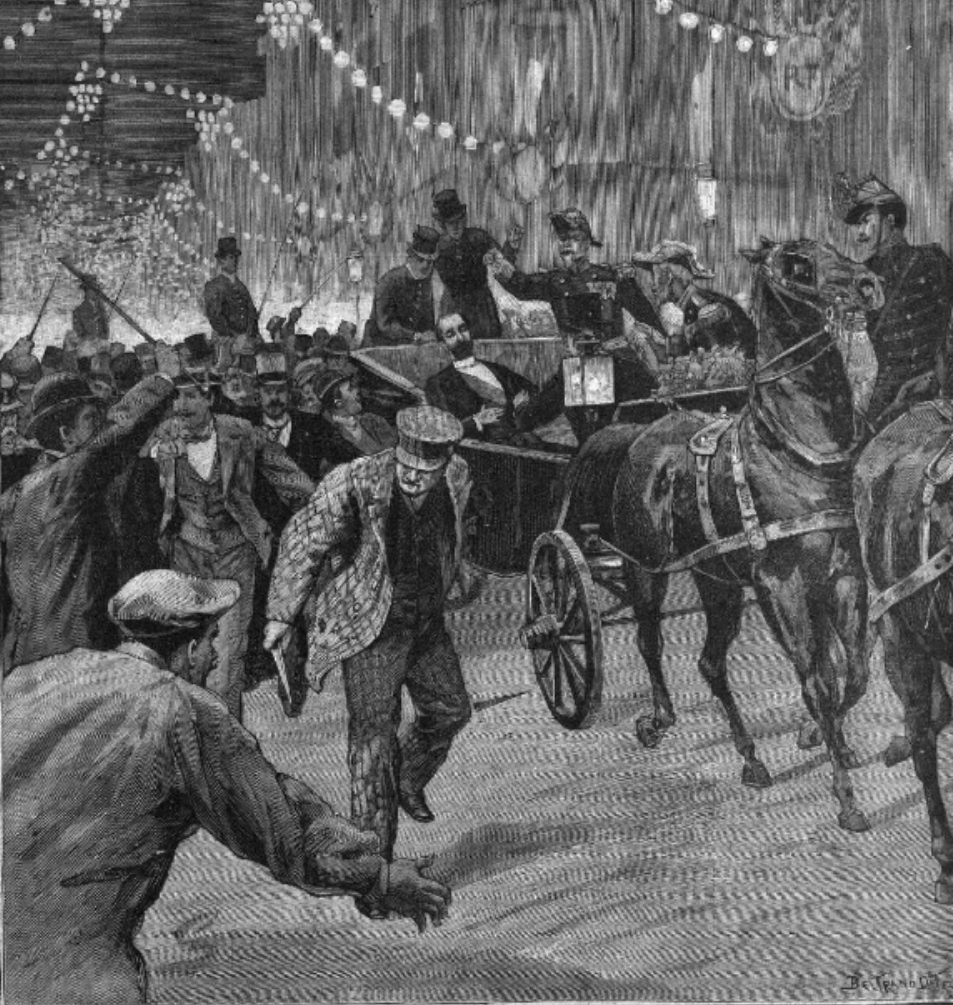
Representation of the assassination of Sadi Carnot by Sante Caserio, Le Petit Parisien: supplément illustré (8 July 1894)

On 23 June 1894, Sante Caserio reported to work but suddenly argued with his employer, despite having been on good terms until then. Around 11:00 AM, he visited gunsmith Guillaume Vaux and purchased a dagger. By 1:30 PM, he arrived alone at the Café du Gard, where he inquired about the schedule and fare for the next train from Avignon to Lyon. Later, he met with Saurel, who later claimed their conversation focused only on Caserio's dispute with Vialla and his plans to seek work in Montpellier.

At 3:00 PM, Caserio boarded a train to Montpellier. Upon arrival, he visited an anarchist named Laborie, leaving around 9:00 PM to catch the 11:00 PM train to Avignon. His activities during the two-hour gap remain unknown. To evade potential surveillance, he changed trains multiple times, arriving in Vienne by morning. There, he met three comrades during the morning, all of whom later insisted they discussed only trivial matters.

Caserio then began walking toward Lyon, 30 kilometers away, where Sadi Carnot was scheduled to attend a parade that evening for the Exposition internationale et coloniale (1894)—France's first colonial exposition. His impending act thus aligned with a recurring anticolonial trend within anarchism. Around 3:00 PM on 24 June 1894, he stopped to ask a farmer in Simandres (Isère) for water. An hour and a half later, he passed through Saint-Syphorien-d’Ozon.

=== Attack ===
From that moment on, he was not seen again until the attack, which is relatively important for understanding the upcoming assassination. This is because it is likely that—contrary to what Caserio claimed during his trial—the anarchist has been aided or coordinated with a small group of Lyonnais anarchists to orchestrate his plot.

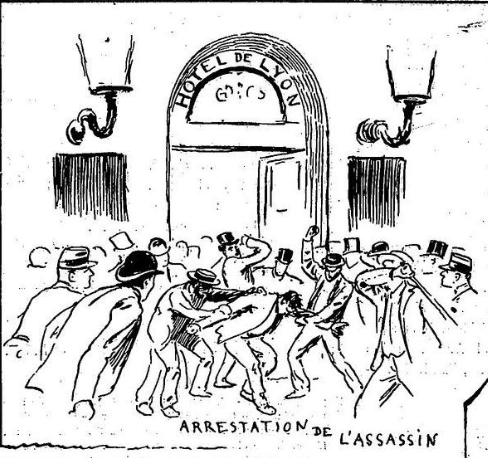
Representation of the arrest of Sante Caserio in L'Univers illustré (30 June 1894)

Shortly before 9:00 P.M, Caserio positioned himself along the route of President Carnot's procession at the precise spot where he could assassinate him, namely to the right of the carriage, facing against the direction of movement. The carriage, departing from the Palais du Commerce, entered the street where the anarchist stood, surrounded by a crowd of cheering onlookers.

When the last riders of the escort passed him, Caserio—masked with a cap—pushed the two people in front of him and lunged at the president, the blade of his dagger concealed in a newspaper. He delivered a single, powerful blow with his right hand and shouted, 'Long live the Revolution!' He then fled as the president fell onto his back, losing consciousness. The mayor of Lyon, Antoine Gailleton, initially did not grasp what had occurred, believing someone had thrown a bouquet of flowers at the president.

Caserio nearly escaped but, while shouting 'Long live anarchy!' during his flight, the escort that had overtaken him turned back to apprehend him. He failed to reach the crowd, which closed in around him. The crowd seized him, beating him before police intervened. Meanwhile, Carnot was rushed to Hôtel Dieu hospital. Struck in the liver in two places, he had little chance of survival and died a few hours later on 25 June 1894 around 00:30 A.M.

=== Following events ===
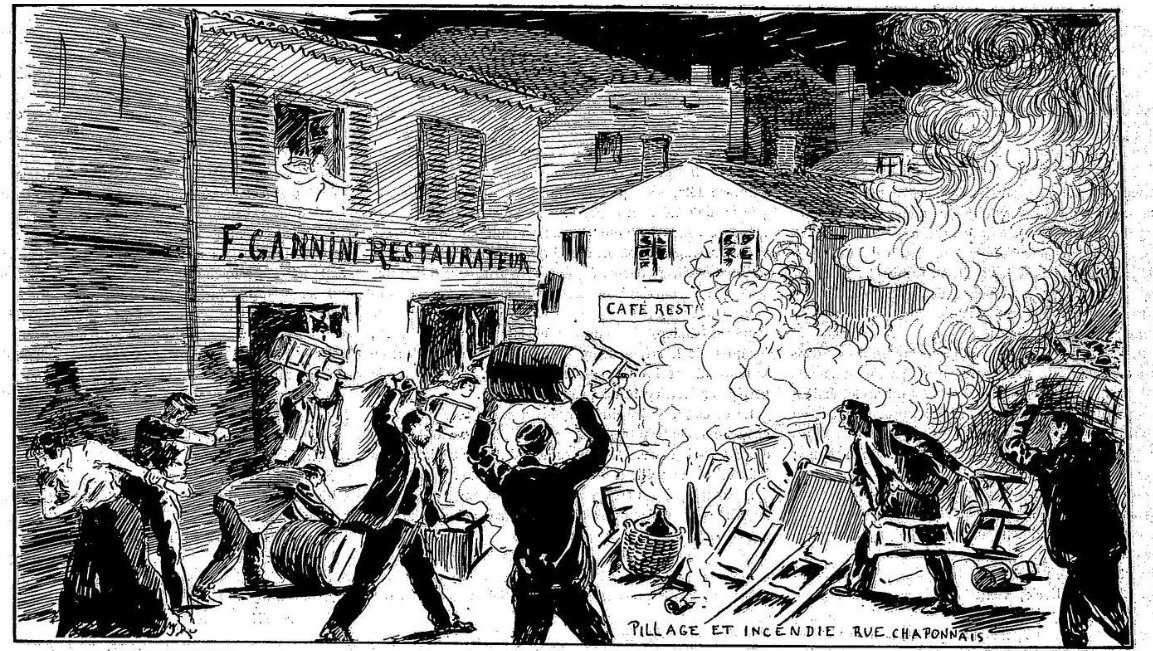
Representation of French anti-Italian riots and plundering following Caserio's act in L'Univers illustré (30 June 1894)

Caserio's act triggered significant xenophobic anti-Italian riots in Lyon as soon as the public learned of the president's death and the assassin's identity. On the evening of the attack, gathering places of Italians in Lyon were targeted, the consulate was stormed, and had to be protected by overwhelmed police forces due to the scale of ethnic violence. In the following days, many Italian-owned properties and businesses in the city were looted. The assassination caused profound shock among parts of the French population, who paid tribute to Carnot. However, in the popular unrest following the attack, Italians rather than anarchists were disproportionately targeted. Caserio's act marked the final attack of the Ère des attentats (1892-1894) and remains one of its most notable.

Lyon anarchists, wary of repression, largely avoided openly supporting the attack. Many were swiftly searched, arrested, and later released.

=== Trial ===
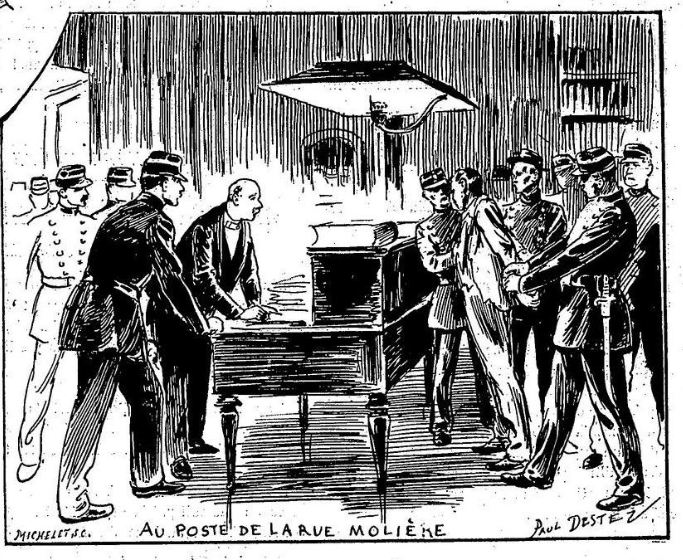
Representation of Caserio at the police post in L'Univers illustré (30 June 1894)

Caserio was interrogated in Lyon by investigating judge Benoist. He denied knowing any anarchists in France, whether in Sète, Lyon, or Vienne. He spoke of his journey from Italy but refused to address questions about potential ties to other militants. Strangely, during pre-trial confrontations, Guillaume Vaux, who allegedly sold the dagger used in the attack, stated he did not recognize Caserio and claimed the purchaser was not the same person. Vaux also asserted the dagger had been bought the day before, not by Caserio, and in the evening. Caserio disputed this testimony and provided a relatively accurate description of the interior of Vaux's gunshop, eventually prompting Vaux to accept his account. The judge largely overlooked significant investigative leads, hastily dismissing and expediting the inquiry to bring Caserio to trial as quickly as possible. For instance, a soldier imprisoned for insubordination, who was hospitalized in February 1894 alongside Caserio, claimed to have overheard him planning the attack on Carnot with Saurel. The two allegedly discussed how a bomb would not be the most effective method to kill their target and instead considered striking during the colonial exhibition scheduled months later—a claim Caserio vehemently denied. However, the judge paid little attention to this testimony, likely dismissing it as a rumor aimed at securing a reduced sentence, and set it aside.

Caserio's trial opened on 2 August 1894, presided over by Judge Breuillac, who began the proceedings with a biased declaration against the accused. Berthoud highlights Caserio's responses during the trial, in which he stated he targeted Carnot both as representing the state and bourgeois justice and as personally responsible for repressive policies. For instance, Caserio declared:

—I don’t know whether Mr. Carnot was rich or not. What I know is that he represented the entire bourgeois society, the entire bourgeois justice system. And if he gave charity to the poor, he did so with money given to him through taxes paid by those who work.
—Did you think, when striking this man amid the crowd’s exclamations, of his wife and children, who loved him dearly?
—I did not think of Mr. Carnot’s wife and children, since he, too, did not think of the wives and children of the thousands of anarchists who were arrested, nor of Vaillant’s daughter.

Caserio invoked Vaillant's daughter, Sidonie Vaillant at other times during the trial. He also claimed to be avenging the executions of Émile Henry and Ravachol. The anarchist fully admitted to the attack and refused to discuss potential ties to other anarchists, insisting he acted alone. He clashed with his defense attorney, who attempted to portray him as psychologically unstable and thus criminally irresponsible—a strategy Caserio rejected, asserting he was fully accountable and motivated by political reasons.

He had little chance of avoiding the death penalty, the trial's one-sided and rushed nature was noted by observers like Henri Varenne. Caserio was sentenced to death the following day after just twenty minutes of deliberation. His attorney filed a procedural appeal, citing the judge's biased opening remarks, but it was denied. As he was led out of court, Caserio shouted, 'Long live anarchy'.

=== Execution ===
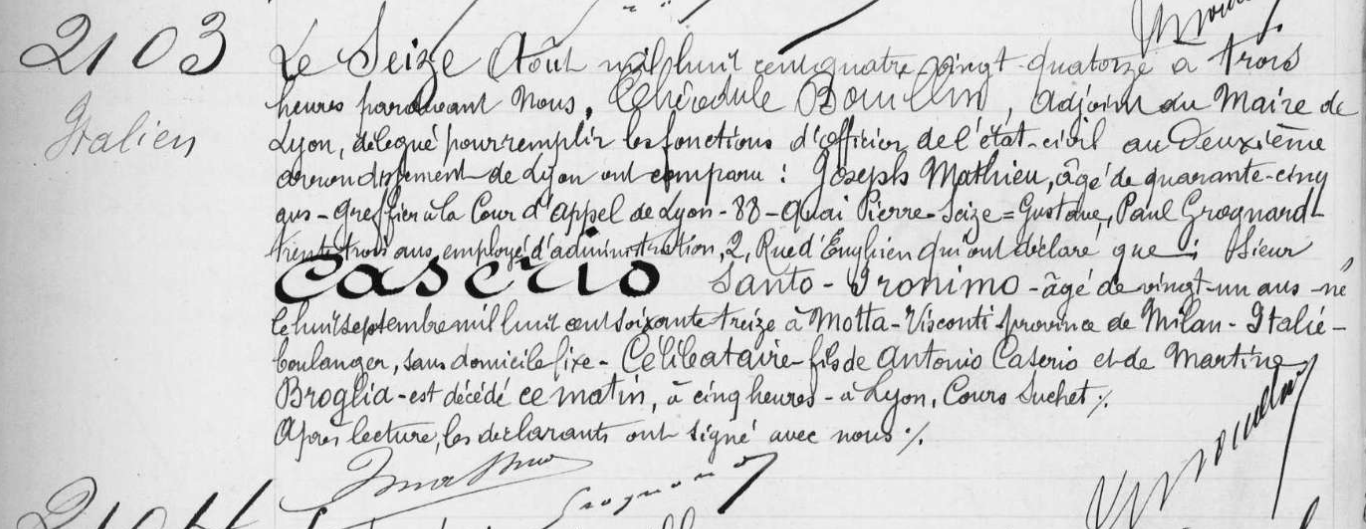
Sante Caserio's death certificate, Archives municipales de Lyon, 16 August 1894

Caserio refused to sign a request for a pardon or an appeal to the Court of Cassation. He still was awaiting his execution with anxiety. On 9 August, he signed a document declaring he did not wish to donate his body to science—a way to avoid the fate of Émile Henry, whose corpse was mocked by doctors during his autopsy. The anarchist also rejected visits from the priest of Motta-Visconti, who came to see him in prison. On 15 August, Caserio wrote his final text, addressed to his sister:

Here are my last written words, dear sister, that I can send you. When you read these final lines, my head will have fallen under the guillotine! Do not believe those who call me an assassin, but know that I die for a great ideal.
Today you are young, but the day will come when you will be forced to fight against misery, and then you will know why your brother died!

The next morning, around 4:30 A.M., he was awakened by guards, once again refused religious assistance, and was led to the guillotine without uttering a word. Upon reaching the scaffold, he spoke a few words in Italian—either 'Long live anarchy' or 'I do not want'—before being executed. His head fell into the basket at the base of the guillotine as the gathered crowd applauded, a rare occurrence at such events. Upon learning of his death, Caserio's older brother, Giovanni, committed suicide.

== Bibliography ==
- Accoce, Pierre (1998). "« Ils ont eu Sadi Carnot ! »" [They got Sadi Carnot!]. Ces assassins qui ont voulu changer l'Histoire (in French). Paris: Plon. ISBN 978-2259189873.
- Berthoud, Joël (1969). L'attentat contre Carnot et ses rapports avec le mouvement anarchiste des années 90 (mémoire) [The attack on Carnot and it's relationship with the anarchist movement of the 1890s (memory)] (PDF) (in French).
- Bouhey, Vivien (2009), Les Anarchistes contre la République [The Anarchists against the Republic], Rennes: Presses universitaires de Rennes (PUR)
- Jourdain, Edouard (2018), Anarchisme et colonialisme [Anarchism and colonialism] (in French), Réfractions, pp. 135–149
- Piarotas, Mireille (2000). Regards populaires sur la violence [Popular looks at violence] (in French). Saint Etienne (France): Presses Universitaires de Saint-Etienne (PUSE). ISBN 978-2862721804.
