= Auguste Vaillant =

French revolutionary and anarchist (1861–1894)

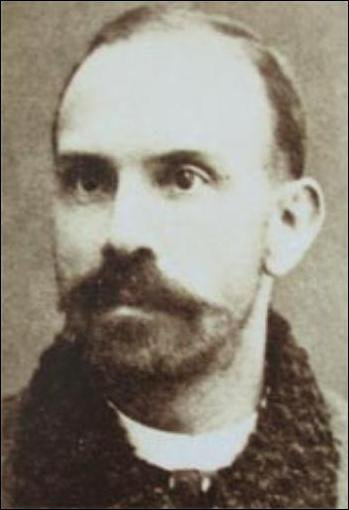
- Auguste Vaillant
- Born: 27 December 1861; Mézières, Ardennes, France
- Died: 5 February 1894 (aged 32); Paris, France
- Cause of death: Execution by guillotine

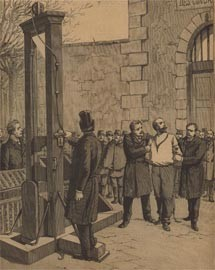
Vaillant about to be guillotined

Auguste Vaillant (French pronunciation: [ɔɡyst vajɑ̃]; 27 December 1861 – 5 February 1894) was a French anarchist communist known for his bomb attack on the French Chamber of Deputies on 9 December 1893. The French government's reaction to this attack was the passing of the anti-anarchist Lois scélérates ("villainous laws").

== Life ==
Auguste Vaillant's father was a gendarme in Corsica who abandoned his mother, forcing her to put Auguste into foster care. At the age of 12, he was living alone in Paris, apprenticed to a pastry chef. He was arrested and jailed several times in various cities, for begging and for theft. In 1885, he was living on rue Ordener in Paris, and was secretary for the Revolutionary Socialist Union of the 18th arrondissement. Over time, he moved further towards anarchism.

In 1890, he left for Argentina and participated in the newspaper Liberté. In 1893, he returned to Paris.

In Paris, he planned his attack on the Chamber of Deputies, and kept a diary in which he recorded his motivations, which he sent to Paul Reclus before the attack. Vaillant threw the home-made explosive device from the public gallery at about 4pm on 9 December 1893. He was himself injured in the explosion, and was treated at hospital. Questioned by police, he admitted to the attack. At his trial in Paris he was defended by Fernand Labori. Vaillant claimed that his aim was not to kill but to wound as many deputies as possible. Despite this, Vaillant was sentenced to death—the first time in 19th-century France that someone who had killed no one had been sentenced to death.

A petition was begun asking for a pardon for Vaillant, signed by 60 of the deputies. There was also much public sympathy for him for the sake of his young daughter, Sidonie, whom Vaillant entrusted to Sébastien Faure. The president of the Republic, however, declined to sign a pardon.

Vaillant was put to death by guillotine on 5 February 1894. Vaillant's last words were "Death to bourgeois society and long live Anarchy!" Benedict Anderson claimed his execution was "the first instance in French memory of the death penalty being used in a case where no victim had died."

His bombing and execution in turn inspired the attacks of Émile Henry and Sante Geronimo Caserio (who stabbed to death Marie François Sadi Carnot, President of the French Third Republic) and Bhagat Singh (who threw a low-intensity bomb into the Central Legislative Assembly in British India, and was later hanged).
