= Victorina Trucano =

Italian illegalist anarchist

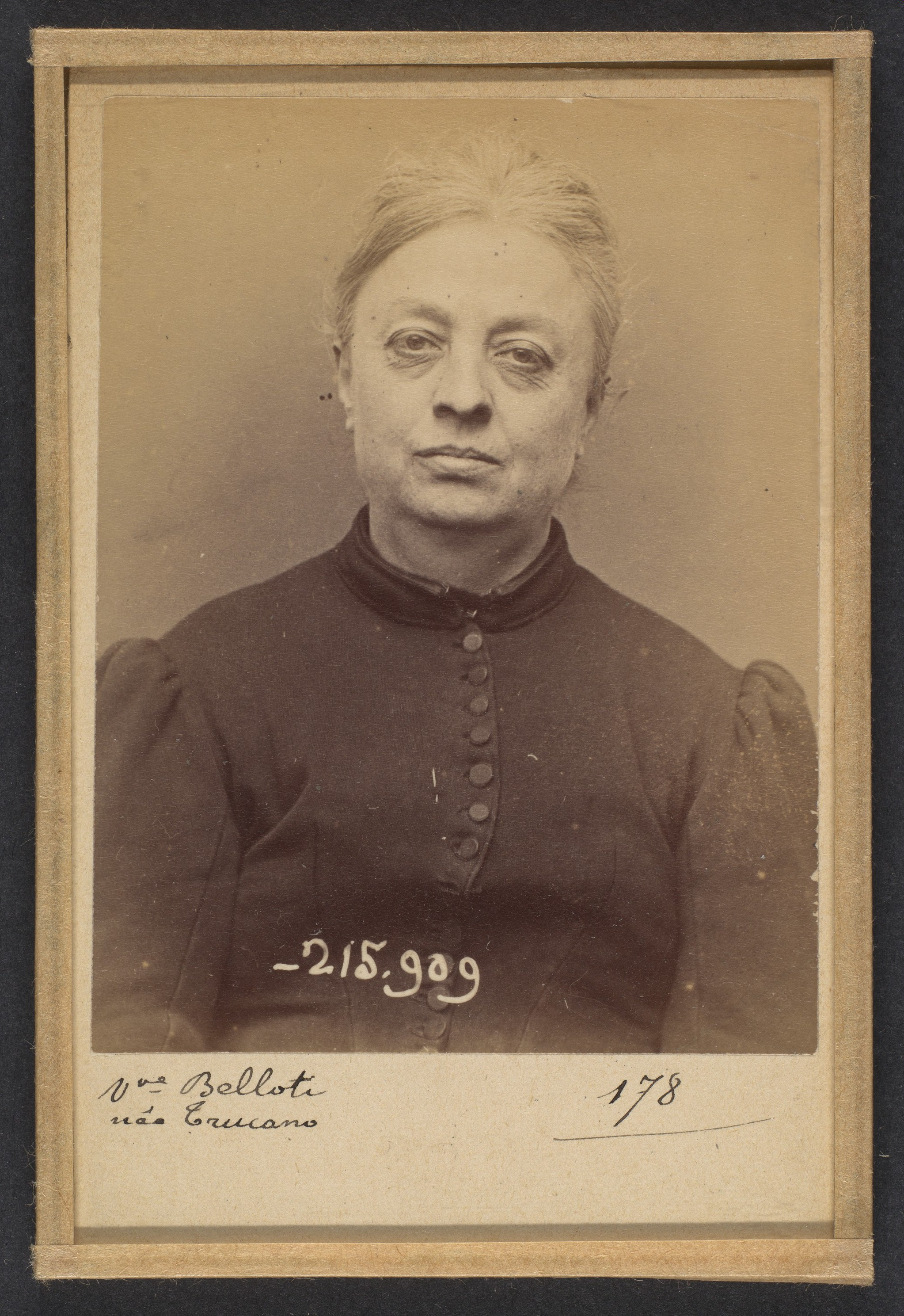
- Trucano's mugshot taken by Alphonse Bertillon in 1894
- Born: May 12, 1839; San Maurizio
- Citizenship: Italy
- Occupations: hatmaker fencer anarchist
- Known for: Illegalist activism
- Movement: Anarchism

Victorina Trucano or Victorina Belloti, (1839-?), was an Italian hatmaker and illegalist anarchist. She is best known for her actions during the rise of illegalism, where she joined the Ortiz gang, and for being accused in the Trial of the Thirty.

Born in Italy and a widow from a previous marriage, Trucano joined the Ortiz gang with her son, Luigi. She fenced goods stolen by the group before moving with other members to the hideout where they kept the loot from their robberies. Arrested, she was brought to justice at the Trial of the Thirty, a political trial targeting the anarchist movement, and was ultimately acquitted.

== Biography ==
Victorina Trucano was born in San Maurizio on 12 May 1839. She married a man named Belloti, who may be the Belloti mentioned in Italian police reports in 1881 and as an editor of L'Ateo of Livorno, a newspaper published from 1877 to 1880. Trucano had several children from this marriage, including a son, Luigi Belloti (1868-?). She worked as a hatmaker.

In 1892, while in France and widowed, she joined the Ortiz gang, an illegalist anarchist group of that period. She fenced goods stolen by the group during their burglaries between 1892 and 1893.

In October 1893, Trucano moved to 1 Avenue Brune with her children, including Luigi. This address was a hideout where several gang members resided, including the couples Annette Soubrier-Paolo Chiericotti, Antoinette Cazal-Léon Ortiz, and Maria Zanini-Orsini Bertani. The proceeds from the burglaries were kept at this hideout.

On 19 March 1894, she was arrested with her son during a police raid. She offered no resistance and believed there was a mistake, not even bothering to retrieve her youngest child, thinking the police would not hold her for long.

Contrary to her expectations, Victorina Trucano was put on trial during the Trial of the Thirty, which targeted thirty leading figures of anarchism in France, intended for condemnation in a political trial following the assassination of Sadi Carnot by Sante Caserio. The authorities mixed the illegalists of the Ortiz gang with anarchist theoreticians. She was accused of complicity in the gang's thefts by harboring goods with Maria Zanini a few weeks before the arrest, by moving them in trunks—which she vehemently denied.

Unexpectedly, the jurors acquitted almost all the accused, with the exception of Ortiz, who received the harshest sentence (15 years of deportation to the penal colony), and a few others, including Chiericotti, who was sentenced to eight years of deportation to the penal colony. Trucano was acquitted, as was her son, and released after five months of pre-trial detention.

Upon her release, Trucano requested the return of items taken from her home by the police, but she was unsuccessful, despite several requests.

== Legacy ==
=== Police mugshot ===
Her police mugshot are part of the collections of the Metropolitan Museum of Art (MET).

== Bibliography ==
- Bach Jensen, Richard (2015). The Battle against Anarchist Terrorism: An International History, 1878–1934. Cambridge: Cambridge University Press (CUP). ISBN 978-1-107-03405-1.
- Davranche, Guillaume; Petit, Dominique (2024), "BELLOTI Victorine [dite Veuve BELLOTI, née TRUCANO]", Dictionnaire des anarchistes (Le Maitron), Paris: Le Maitron des anarchistes
- Davranche, Guillaume; Samzun, Patrick (2025), "BELLOTI, Victorine [Née TRUCANO] - La veuve BELOTTI", Dictionnaire international des militants anarchistes, Paris
