= Burglary =

Unlawful entering of a building

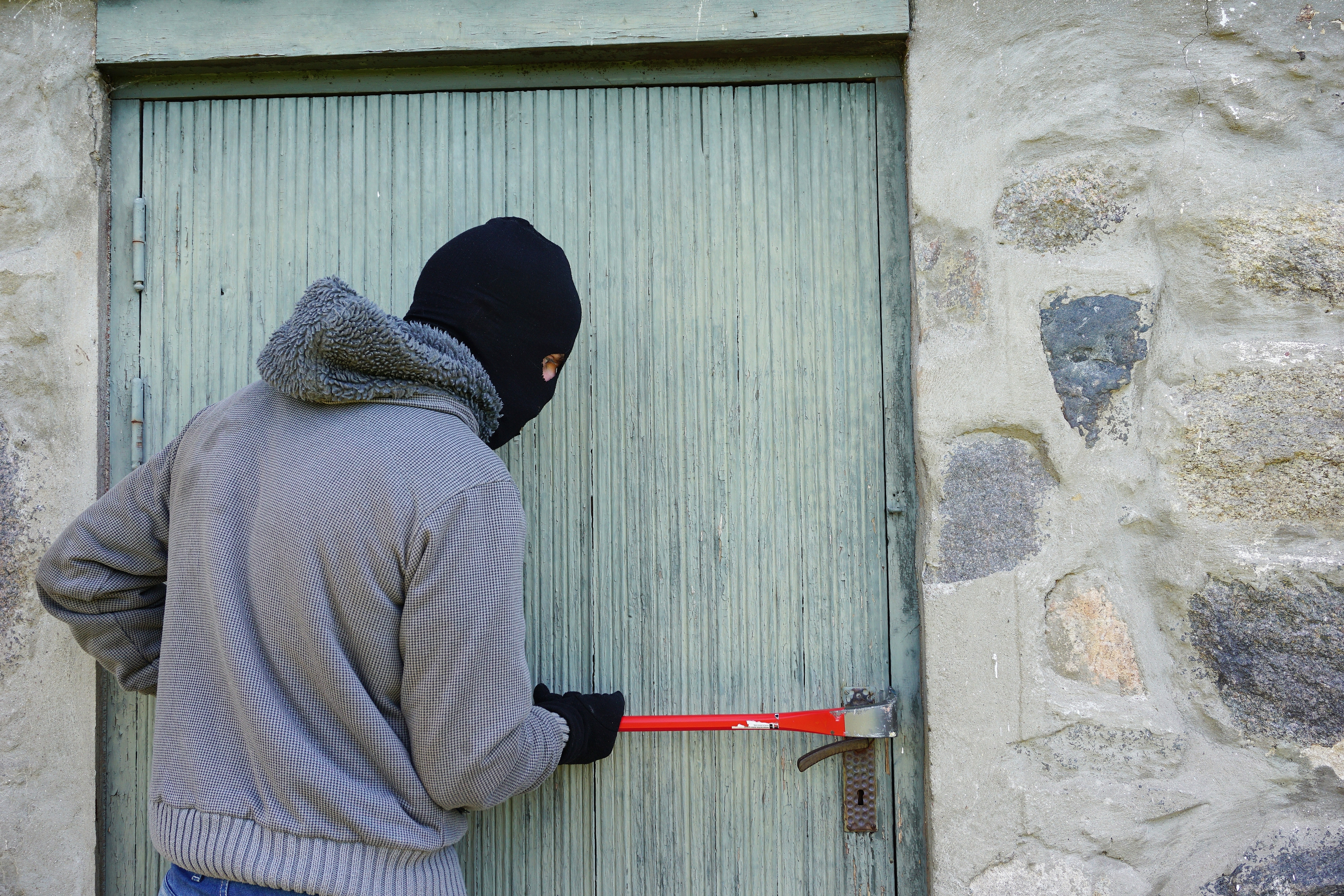
A stereotypical depiction of a burglar

Burglary, also called breaking and entering (B&E) or housebreaking, is a property crime involving the illegal entry into a building or other area without permission, typically with the intention of committing a further criminal offence. Usually that offence is theft, larceny, robbery, or murder, but most jurisdictions include others within the ambit of burglary. To commit burglary is to burgle, a term back-formed from the word burglar, or to burglarize.

== Etymology ==
Sir Edward Coke (1552–1634) explained at the start of Chapter 14 in the third part of Institutes of the Lawes of England (pub. 1644), that the word Burglar ("or the person that committeth burglary"), is derived from the words burgh and laron, meaning house-thieves. A note indicates he relied on the Brooke's case for this definition.

According to one textbook, the etymology originates from Anglo-Saxon or Old English, one of the Germanic languages. (Perhaps paraphrasing Sir Edward Coke:) "The word burglar comes from the two German words burg, meaning "house", and laron, meaning "thief" (literally "house thief")."

Another suggested etymology is from the later Latin word burgare, "to break open" or "to commit burglary", from burgus, meaning "fortress" or "castle", with the word then passing through French and Middle English, with influence from the Latin latro, "thief". The British verb "burgle" is a late back-formation.

== History ==
Ancient references to breaking into a house can be found in the Code of Hammurabi (no. 21) and the Torah (Exodus 22:2).

Sir Edward Coke, in chapter 14 of the third part of the Institutes of the Lawes of England, describes the felony of Burglary and explains the various elements of the offence. He distinguished this from housebreaking because the night aggravated the offence since the night time was when man was at rest. He also described the night as the time when the countenance of a man could not be discerned.

In Pleas of the Crown. A Methodical Summary, Sir Matthew Hale classifies Burglary and Arson as offences "against the dwelling or habitation".

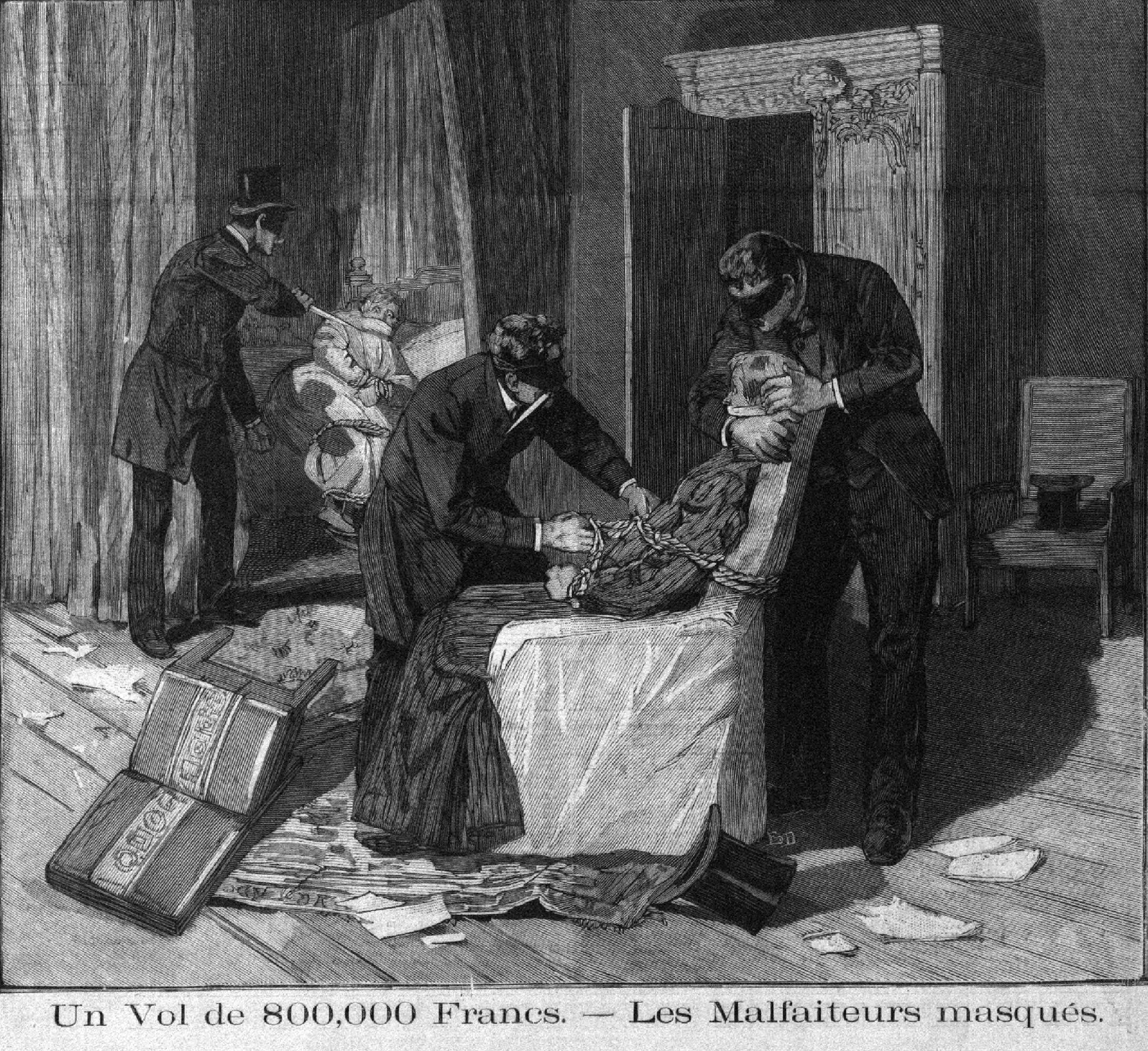
Romanced depiction of the Fiquefleur burglary by the illegalist Ortiz gang, Chiericotti (?), Ortiz and Henry in Le Petit Parisien (1893)

In chapter 16 of the fourth book of the Commentaries on the Laws of England, Sir William Blackstone observes that Burglary "... has always been looked on as a very heinous offence: not only because of the abundant terror that it naturally carries with it, but also as it is a forcible invasion of that right of habitation..."

During the 19th Century, English politicians turned their minds to codifying English law. In 1826, Sir Robert Peel was able to achieve some long advocated reforms by codifying offences concerning larceny and other property offences as well as offences against the person. Further reforms followed in 1861. Colonial legislatures generally adopted the English reforms. However, while further Criminal Code reforms failed to progress through the English parliament during the 1880s, other colonies, including Canada, India, New Zealand and various Australian states codified their criminal law.

== Common-law definition ==
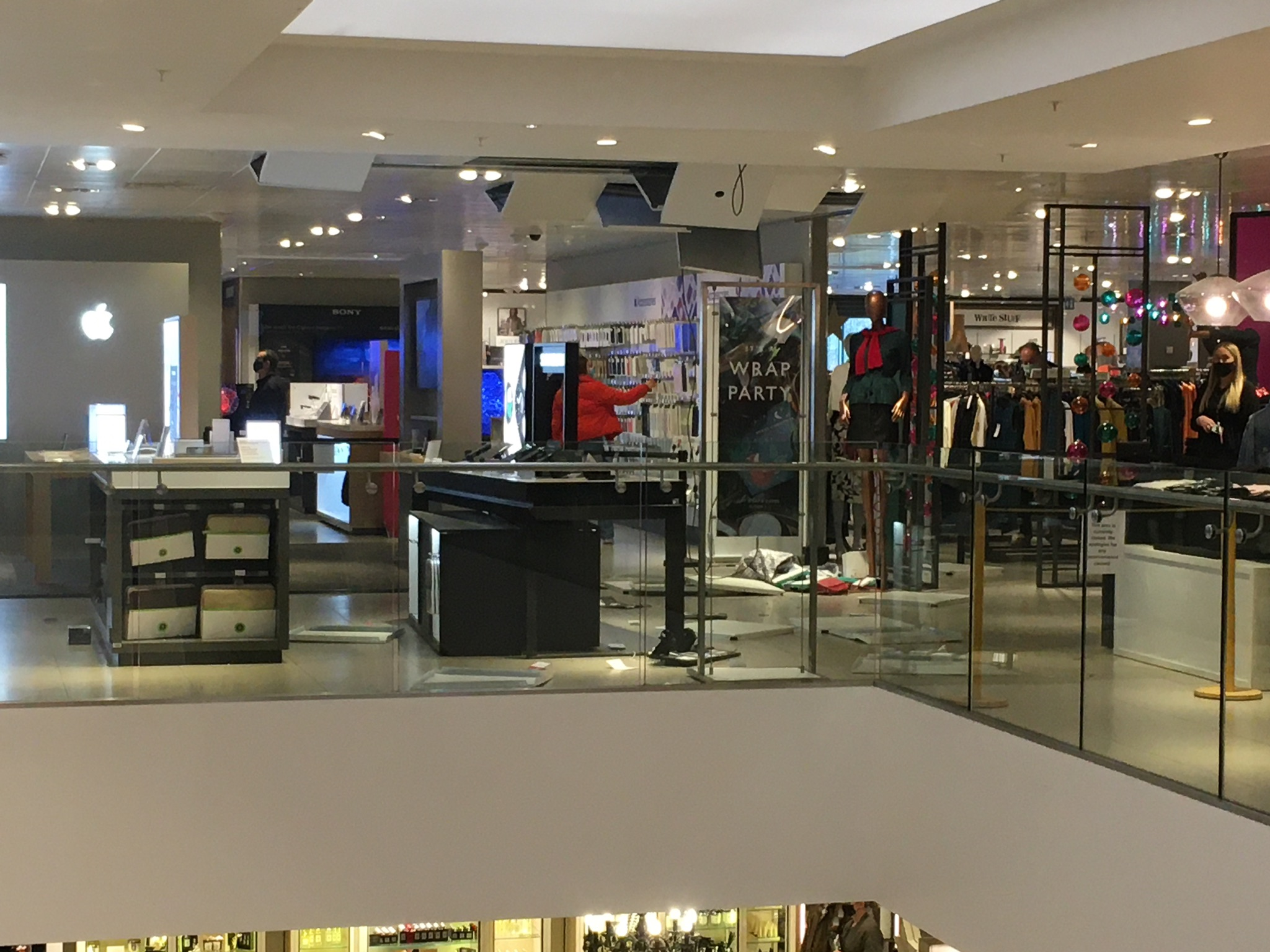
The aftermath of a burglary at a branch of John Lewis in High Wycombe, Buckinghamshire, UK. The thieves entered the building via the roof and descended to the second floor through the ceiling to steal electronic goods, inflicting substantial damage to the ceiling and floor space.

At common law, burglary was defined by Sir Matthew Hale as:

The breaking and entering the house of another in the night time, with intent to commit a felony therein, whether the felony be actually committed or not.

1. Breaking can be either actual, such as by forcing open a door, or constructive, such as by fraud or threats. Breaking does not require that anything be "broken" in terms of physical damage occurring. A person who has permission to enter part of a house, but not another part, commits a breaking and entering when they use any means to enter a room where they are not permitted, so long as the room was not open to enter.
2. Entering can involve either physical entry by a person, or the insertion of an instrument to remove property. Insertion of a tool to gain entry may not constitute entering by itself. There must be a breaking and an entering for common-law burglary. Breaking without entry or entry without breaking is not sufficient for common-law burglary.
3. Although rarely listed as an element, the common law required that "entry occur as a consequence of the breaking". For example, if wrongdoers partially open a window with a pry bar—but then notice an open door, which they use to enter the dwelling instead, there is no burglary under common law. (Note: Common law burglary requires both a breaking and entry. Some statutory offences are phrased in terms of a breaking or entry. The use of the disjunctive is intended to expand the scope of the offence.) The use of the pry bar would not constitute an entry even if a portion of the prybar "entered" the residence. Under the instrumentality rule the use of an instrument to effect a breaking would not constitute an entry. However, if any part of the perpetrator's body entered the residence in an attempt to gain entry, the instrumentality rule did not apply. Thus, if the perpetrators used the prybar to pry open the window and then used their hands to lift the partially opened window, an "entry" would have taken place when they grasped the bottom of the window with their hands.
4. House includes a temporarily unoccupied dwelling, but not a building used only occasionally as a habitation.
5. Night time is defined as hours between half an hour after sunset and half an hour before sunrise.
6. Typically this element is expressed as the intent to commit a felony "therein". The use of the word "therein" adds nothing and certainly does not limit the scope of burglary to those wrongdoers who break and enter a dwelling intending to commit a felony on the premises. The situs of the felony does not matter, and burglary occurs if the wrongdoers intended to commit a felony at the time they broke and entered.

The common-law elements of burglary often vary between jurisdictions. The common-law definition has been expanded in most jurisdictions, such that the building need not be a dwelling or even a building in the conventional sense, physical breaking is not necessary, the entry does not need to occur at night, and the intent may be to commit any felony or theft.

== Criminal psychology ==
Some studies indicate that most burglars will scan the target of their burglary multiple times before committing the crime. Many burglars were shown to always be in a state of 'half-looking' or scanning for potential targets through unconscious situational awareness.

Studies suggest that most burglars target properties that are close to their own residence and are routinely vacant without a guardian present. Burglars may rarely have a specific property in mind before they burglarize, but will rather have a general area they wish to offend within. Burglars will often knock on a door to check if the property is occupied.

The majority of burglars have been shown to commit the crime for financial reasons, while a small minority stated that they committed the crime out of boredom. Some studies indicate that burglars will experience physiological arousal before, during, and after the crime.

== Canada ==
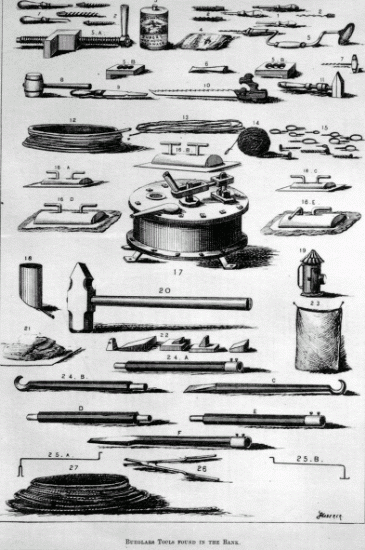
Burglars Tools Found in the Bank, printed in 1875 in the Canadian Illustrated News

In Canada, breaking is prohibited by section 348 of the Criminal Code. It is an indictable offense when committed in residence, and otherwise a hybrid offense. Breaking and Entering is defined as breaking into a place with intent to commit another indictable offense (including, but not limited to theft). The crime is commonly referred to in Canada as breaking and entering, which in turn is often shortened to B and E.

== Finland ==
There is no crime of burglary as such in Finland. In the case of breaking and entering, the Finnish penal code states that

A person who unlawfully

(1) enters domestic premises by force, stealth or deception, or hides or stays in

such premises [...]
shall be sentenced for invasion of domestic premises to a fine or to imprisonment for at most six months.

However, if theft is committed during unlawful entering, then a person is guilty of theft or aggravated theft depending on the circumstances of the felony.

Aggravated theft:

(1) If in the theft

(5) the offender breaks into an occupied residence,

and the theft is aggravated also when assessed as a whole, the offender shall be sentenced for aggravated theft to imprisonment for at least four months and at most four years.

== New Zealand ==
In New Zealand, burglary is a statute offence under section 231 of the Crimes Act 1961. Originally this was a codification of the common law offence, though from October 2004 the break element was removed from the definition and entry into the building (or ship), or a part of it, now only needed to be unauthorised. The definition of a building is very broad to cover all forms of dwelling, including an enclosed yard. Unauthorised entry onto agricultural land with intent to commit an imprisonable offence (section 231A) was added in March 2019 as a burglary type offence.

== Sweden ==
In Sweden, burglary does not exist as an offence in itself; instead, there are two available offences. If a person simply breaks into any premise, they are technically guilty of either unlawful intrusion (olaga intrång) or breach of domiciliary peace (hemfridsbrott), depending on the premise in question. Breach of domiciliary peace is applicable only when people "unlawfully intrude or remain where others have their living quarters". The only punishments available for any of these offences are fines, unless the offences are considered gross. In such cases, the maximum punishment is two years' imprisonment.

However, if the person who has forced themself into a house steals anything ("takes what belongs to another with intent to acquire it"), they are guilty of (ordinary) theft (stöld). However, the section regarding gross theft (Chapter 6, 4s of the Penal Code, grov stöld) states "in assessing whether the crime is gross, special consideration shall be given to whether the unlawful appropriation took place after intrusion into a dwelling." For theft, the punishment is imprisonment of at most two years, while gross theft carries a punishment of between six months and six years.

== United Kingdom ==
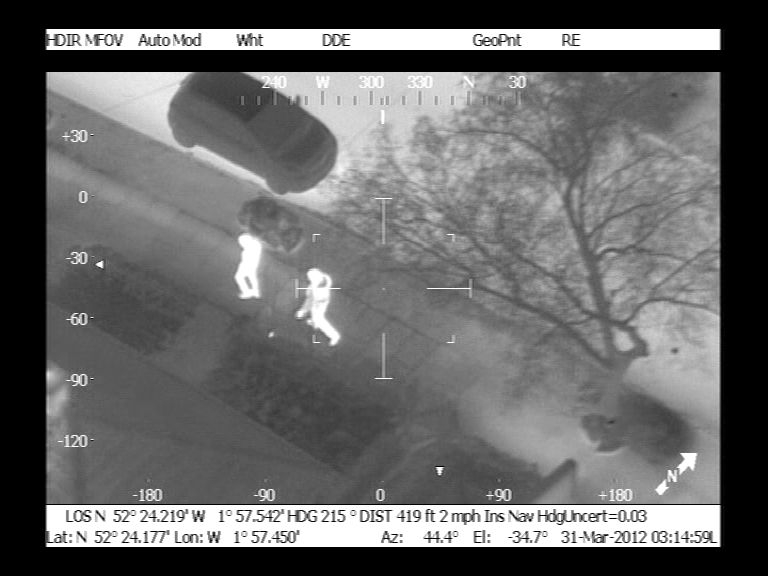
Burglary suspect discarding an item in bushes as he tries to get away from pursuing officers of the West Midlands Police

=== England and Wales ===
Burglary is defined by section 9 of the Theft Act 1968, which describes two variants:

1. A person is guilty of burglary if they enter any building or part of a building as a trespasser with intent to steal, inflict grievous bodily harm or do unlawful damage to the building or anything in it. (Note: Although as originally passed, the Theft Act 1968 also prohibited "raping any woman therein", the Sexual Offences Act 2003 repealed this prohibition and substituted the offence known as trespass with intent to commit a sexual offence.)
2. A person is guilty of burglary if, having entered a building or part of a building as a trespasser, they steal or attempt to steal anything in the building, or inflict or attempt to inflict grievous bodily harm on any person in the building.

=== Northern Ireland ===
The offence is defined in similar terms to England and Wales by the Theft Act (Northern Ireland) 1969.

=== Scotland ===
Under Scots law, the crime of burglary does not exist. Instead theft by housebreaking covers theft where the security of the building is overcome. It does not include any other aspect of burglary found in England and Wales. It is a crime usually prosecuted under solemn procedure in a superior court. Another common law crime still used is Hamesuken, which covers forced entry into a building where a serious assault on the occupant takes place. Common law crimes in Scotland are gradually being replaced by statutes.

== United States ==
In the United States, burglary is prosecuted as a felony or misdemeanor and involves trespassing and theft, entering a building or automobile, or loitering unlawfully with intent to commit any crime, not necessarily a theft – for example, vandalism. Even if nothing is stolen in a burglary, the act is a statutory offense. Buildings can include hangars, sheds, barns, and coops; burglary of boats, aircraft, trucks, military equipment, and railway cars is possible. Burglary may be an element in crimes involving rape, arson, kidnapping, identity theft, or violation of civil rights; indeed, the "plumbers" of the Watergate scandal were technically burglars. Any entry into the building or automobile of another with the intent to commit a crime, even if the entry would otherwise be permitted for lawful purposes, may constitute burglary on the theory that the permission to enter is only extended for lawful purposes (for example, a shoplifter may be prosecuted for burglary in addition to theft, for entering a shop with the intent to steal). As with all legal definitions in the U.S., the foregoing description may not be applicable in every jurisdiction, since there are 50 separate state criminal codes, plus federal and territorial codes in force.

=== Home invasion ===
Commission of a burglary with the intention or result of confronting persons on the premises may constitute an aggravated offense known as "home invasion". Taking or attempting to take property by force or threat of force from persons on the premises also constitutes the offense of robbery.

=== Nighttime burglaries ===
In some states, a burglary committed during the hours of daylight is technically not burglary, but housebreaking. In many jurisdictions in the U.S., burglary is punished more severely than housebreaking.

In states that continue to punish burglary more severely than housebreaking twilight, night is traditionally defined as hours between 30 minutes after sunset and 30 minutes before sunrise.

=== Inchoate crime ===
There is some recent scholarly treatment of burglaries in American law as inchoate crimes, but this is in dispute. Some academics consider burglary an inchoate crime. Others say that because the intrusion itself is harmful, this justifies punishment even when no further crime is committed.

Burglary, as a preliminary step to another crime, can be seen as an inchoate, or incomplete, offense. As it disrupts the security of persons in their homes and in regard to their personal property, however, it is complete as soon as the intrusion is made. This dual nature is at the heart of a debate about whether the crime of burglary ought to be abolished and its elements covered by attempt or aggravating circumstances to other crimes—or retained, and the grading schemes reformed to reflect the seriousness of individual offenses.

Possession of burglars' tools, in jurisdictions that make this an offense, has also been viewed as an inchoate crime:

In effect piling an inchoate crime onto an inchoate crime, the possession of burglary tools with the intent to use them in a burglary is a serious offense, a felony in some jurisdictions. Gloves that defendants were trying to shake off as they ran from the site of a burglary were identified as burglar's tools in Green v. State (Fla. App. 1991).

=== California ===
In California, what is defined as "first-degree burglary" is residential while "second-degree burglary" is commercial or auto burglary. The first is a felony that carries a penalty of two, four, or six years in prison as well as up to $10,000 in fines. The sentence also counts toward California's three-strikes law. Second-degree burglary can be prosecuted as a felony, carrying a 16-month, 2, or 3 year jail sentence as well as up to $10,000 in fines, or a misdemeanor, carrying up to 1 year in jail and up to $1,000 in fines. Burglary differs from retail theft or shoplifting in California. Possession of burglary tools carries six month in county jail.

=== Florida ===
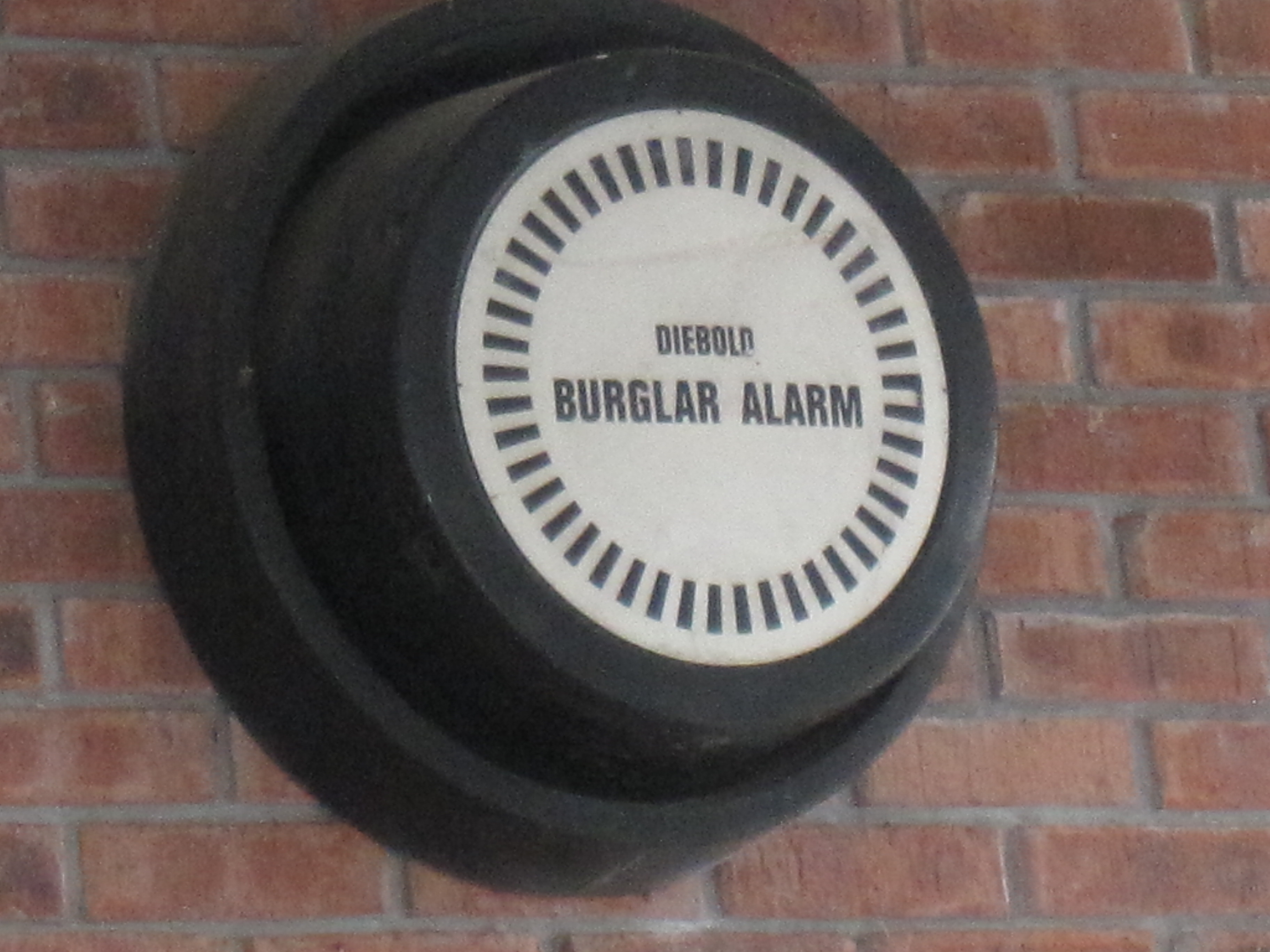
Burglar alarm outside a bank in Florida

Under Florida State Statutes, "burglary" occurs when a person "enter[s] a dwelling, a structure, or a conveyance with the intent to commit an offense therein, unless the premises are at the time open to the public or the defendant is licensed or invited to enter." Depending on the circumstances of the crime, burglary can be classified as third, second, first-degree, or life felonies, with maximum sentences of five years, fifteen years, thirty years, and life, respectively. The minimum sentences are probation, 21 months, and 124 1/2 months, except that if the person had a gun, a judge uses the 10-20-Life Law, 10 years on anyone convicted of committing or attempting to commit any of the above felonies (with certain exceptions), while armed with a firearm or destructive device. If a firearm was discharged, 20 years. If a bullet injures or kills someone, 25 years.

=== Georgia ===
A person commits the offense of burglary when, without authority and with the intent to commit a felony or theft therein, he enters or remains within the dwelling house of another or any building, vehicle, railroad car, watercraft, or other such structure designed for use as the dwelling of another or enters or remains within any other building, railroad car, aircraft, or any room or any part thereof. A person convicted of the offense of burglary, for the first such offense, shall be punished by imprisonment for not less than one nor more than 20 years. For the purposes of this Code section, the term "railroad car" shall also include trailers on flatcars, containers on flatcars, trailers on railroad property, or containers on railroad property. O.C.G.A. § 16-7-1.

=== Kentucky ===
Burglary and the intended crime, if carried out, are treated as separate offenses. Burglary is a felony, even when the intended crime is a misdemeanor, and the intent to commit the crime can occur when one "enters or remains unlawfully" in the building, expanding the common-law definition. It has three degrees. Third-degree burglary is the broadest, and applies to any building or other premises. Second-degree burglary retains the common-law element of a dwelling, and first-degree burglary requires that the accused be in a dwelling and armed with a weapon or have intent to cause injury. A related offense, criminal trespass, covers unlawful entry to buildings or premises without the intent to commit a crime, and is a misdemeanor or, in the third degree, a violation. Possession of burglar's tools, with the intent to use them to commit burglary or theft, is a misdemeanor.

=== Massachusetts ===
The Commonwealth of Massachusetts uses the term "burglary" to refer to a night-time breaking and entering of a dwelling with the intent to commit a felony. Burglary is a felony punishable by not more than twenty years; should the burglar enter with a dangerous weapon, they may be imprisoned for life. Unlawful entries of a structure other than a dwelling are labeled "breaking and entering" and punishments vary according to structure.

=== Maryland ===
In Maryland, under title 6, subtitle 2 of the criminal law code, the crime of burglary is divided into four degrees. The first three degrees are felonies, while fourth-degree burglary is a misdemeanor. Breaking and entering into a dwelling with intent to commit theft or a crime of violence is first-degree burglary. Breaking and entering into a "storehouse" (a structure other than a dwelling, also including watercraft, aircraft, railroad cars, and vessels) with intent to commit theft, arson, or a crime of violence is second-degree burglary. Third-degree burglary is defined as breaking and entering into a dwelling with intent to commit a crime.

Simple breaking and entering into a dwelling or storehouse without specific intent to commit an additional crime is fourth-degree burglary. This degree also includes two other offenses that do not have breaking and entering as an element: Being in or on the yard, garden, or other property of a storehouse or dwelling with the intent to commit theft, or possession of burglar's tools with the intent to use them in a burglary offense.

=== New Hampshire ===
In the criminal code of New Hampshire, "A person is guilty of burglary if they enter a building or occupied structure, or separately secured or occupied section thereof, with purpose to commit a crime therein, unless the premises are at the time open to the public or the actor is licensed or privileged to enter."

=== New York ===
Under the New York Penal Law, burglary is always a felony, even in third degree. It is more serious if the perpetrator uses what appears to be a dangerous weapon or enters a dwelling.

=== Pennsylvania ===
In Pennsylvania, it is a defense to prosecution if the building or structure in question is rendered abandoned. Additionally a person may not be sentenced for both the burglary and the offense the person intended to commit after the burglarious entry or for an attempt to commit that offense, unless the additional offense constitutes a felony of the first or second degree.

=== Virginia ===
In Virginia, there are degrees of burglary, described as "Common Law Burglary" and "Statutory Burglary".

Common Law Burglary is defined as: if any people break and enter the dwelling of another, in the nighttime, with intent to commit a felony or any larceny (theft < $500) therein, shall be guilty of burglary, punishable as a class 3 felony; provided, however, that if such people was armed with a deadly weapon at the time of such entry, they shall be guilty of a class 2 felony.

Statutory Burglary is defined as: If any people in the nighttime enter without breaking, or in the daytime break and enter or enter and conceal themselves in a dwelling house or an adjoining, occupied outhouse, or, in the nighttime enter without breaking or at any time break and enter or enter and conceal themselves in any office, shop, manufactured home, storehouse, warehouse, banking house, church or other house, or any ship, vessel or river craft, or any railroad car, or any automobile, truck, or trailer, if such automobile, truck or trailer is used as a dwelling or place of human habitation, with intent to commit murder, rape, robbery or arson in violation of Virginia State code section 18.2–77, 18.2–79, or 18.2–80, shall be deemed guilty of statutory burglary, which offense shall be a class 3 felony. However, if such people were armed with a deadly weapon at the time of such entry, they shall be guilty of a class 2 felony.

Additionally, if any people commit any of the acts mentioned in the VA state code section 18.2–90 with intent to commit larceny, or any felony other than murder, rape, robbery or arson in violation of VA state code section 18.2–77, 18.2–79, or 18.2–80, or if any people commit any acts mentioned in 18.2–89 or 18.2–90 with intent to commit assault and battery, shall be guilty of statutory burglary, punishable by confinement in a state correctional facility for not less than one or more than twenty years, or, in the discretion of the jury or the court trying the case without a jury, be confined in jail for a period not exceeding twelve months or fined not more than $2,500, either or both. However, if the people were armed with a deadly weapon at the time of such entry, they shall be guilty of a Class 2 felony.

Finally, if any people break and enter a dwelling house while said dwelling is occupied, either in the day or night time, with intent to commit any misdemeanor except assault and battery or trespass (which falls under the previous paragraph), shall be guilty of a class 6 felony. However, if the people were armed with a deadly weapon at the time of such entry, they shall be guilty of a class 2 felony.

=== Wisconsin ===
In Wisconsin, burglary is committed by one who enters a building without permission and with intent to steal or to commit another felony. Burglary may also be committed by entry to a locked truck, car, trailer, motor home, or a ship. The crime of burglary is treated as being more serious if the burglar is armed with a dangerous weapon when the burglary is committed or arms him/herself during the commission of the burglary.

== Protection against burglars ==
Protection of property against burglars can include defenses such as anti-climb paint, safety and security window film, lock and key, and burglar alarms. Dogs of any size can warn residents through loud barking, with larger dogs or multiple medium-to-small dogs posing a threat of severe injury to an intruder. Self-defense is also an option in some jurisdictions.

== Statistics ==
=== Classifications ===
The March 2015 version (1.0) of the International Classification of Crime for Statistical Purposes (ICCS) classifies burglary under section 0501, a subsection of section 05 "Act against property only" (Category 05 at level 1).

In the US, the FBI Uniform Crime Reports classify burglary as a distinct Part 1 index crime.

The Australian and New Zealand Standard Offence Classification (ANZSOC) has a separate top level division (Division 07) for "Unlawful entry with intent/burglary, break and enter".

=== Burglaries by country ===
The UNODC notes "that when using the figures, any cross-national comparisons should be conducted with caution because of the differences that exist between the legal definitions of offences in countries, or the different methods of offence counting and recording". Also, not every crime is reported and the rate of reported crimes may vary by countries.

Evidence from the United States suggests that burglary has declined steadily since 1980 which is mainly attributed to improved household security.

| Country | Reported annual burglaries per 100,000 | Year |
|---|---|---|
| Albania | 14.2 | 2024 |
| Algeria | 14.6 | 2024 |
| Andorra | 110.8 | 2015 |
| Antigua and Barbuda | 107.7 | 2024 |
| Armenia | 29.6 | 2024 |
| Australia | 608.6 | 2023 |
| Austria | 703.0 | 2024 |
| Azerbaijan | 20.3 | 2024 |
| Bahamas | 24.7 | 2022 |
| Bahrain | 15.5 | 2008 |
| Bangladesh | 2.3 | 2006 |
| Barbados | 247.9 | 2022 |
| Belarus | 321.9 | 2006 |
| Belgium | 409.8 | 2024 |
| Belize | 138.6 | 2022 |
| Bermuda | 1180.5 | 2016 |
| Bhutan | 30.9 | 2020 |
| Bolivia | 0.3 | 2018 |
| Bosnia and Herzegovina | 89.8 | 2024 |
| Botswana | 77.6 | 2020 |
| Brazil | 97.9 | 2024 |
| Brunei Darussalam | 150.8 | 2006 |
| Bulgaria | 43.9 | 2024 |
| Cabo Verde | 951.9 | 2018 |
| Cameroon | 13.6 | 2015 |
| Canada | 304.5 | 2024 |
| Chile | 462.3 | 2022 |
| Colombia | 60.3 | 2024 |
| Costa Rica | 457.0 | 2024 |
| Croatia | 186.1 | 2024 |
| Cyprus | 72.5 | 2024 |
| Czech Republic | 271.0 | 2024 |
| Denmark | 517.3 | 2024 |
| Djibouti | 3.1 | 2018 |
| Dominica | 412.4 | 2024 |
| Dominican Republic | 133.1 | 2020 |
| East Timor | 1.5 | 2015 |
| Ecuador | 227.3 | 2024 |
| Egypt | 2.9 | 2011 |
| El Salvador | 37.1 | 2022 |
| England and Wales | 446.8 | 2021 |
| Eswatini | 778.3 | 2004 |
| Finland | 110.6 | 2024 |
| France | 458.1 | 2024 |
| Georgia | 42.3 | 2014 |
| Germany | 352.4 | 2024 |
| Greece | 124.6 | 2024 |
| Grenada | 499.5 | 2022 |
| Guatemala | 173.9 | 2024 |
| Guinea | 12.0 | 2007 |
| Guyana | 9.3 | 2024 |
| Honduras | 33.6 | 2024 |
| Hong Kong | 11.9 | 2022 |
| Hungary | 290.6 | 2015 |
| Iceland | 296.9 | 2024 |
| India | 8.1 | 2013 |
| Indonesia | 18.3 | 2024 |
| Iraq (Central) | 0.6 | 2014 |
| Ireland | 177.7 | 2024 |
| Israel | 114.3 | 2024 |
| Italy | 262.2 | 2024 |
| Ivory Coast | 36.5 | 2008 |
| Jamaica | 7.4 | 2024 |
| Japan | 34.8 | 2024 |
| Jordan | 0.0 | 2012 |
| Kazakhstan | 340.8 | 2011 |
| Kenya | 2.9 | 2022 |
| Kosovo | 219.2 | 2020 |
| Kyrgyzstan | 27.5 | 2020 |
| Latvia | 124.5 | 2024 |
| Lesotho | 236.8 | 2009 |
| Liechtenstein | 361.2 | 2024 |
| Lithuania | 24.2 | 2024 |
| Luxembourg | 626.0 | 2022 |
| Macau | 21.8 | 2024 |
| Madagascar | 4.2 | 2015 |
| Malaysia | 103.4 | 2006 |
| Maldives | 32.5 | 2013 |
| Malta | 134.5 | 2024 |
| Mauritius | 100.7 | 2011 |
| Mexico | 34.8 | 2024 |
| Moldova | 183.1 | 2014 |
| Monaco | 37.6 | 2016 |
| Mongolia | 138.3 | 2024 |
| Montenegro | 50.0 | 2024 |
| Morocco | 36.3 | 2022 |
| Mozambique | 11.0 | 2009 |
| Myanmar | 0.1 | 2022 |
| Nepal | 0.4 | 2016 |
| Netherlands | 181.3 | 2024 |
| New Zealand | 1148.0 | 2020 |
| Nigeria | 1.4 | 2013 |
| North Macedonia | 1.9 | 2024 |
| Northern Ireland | 189.8 | 2023 |
| Norway | 289.8 | 2014 |
| Oman | 0.0 | 2022 |
| Pakistan | 9.4 | 2022 |
| Palestine | 0.3 | 2024 |
| Panama | 116.4 | 2020 |
| Paraguay | 459.8 | 2024 |
| Peru | 13.8 | 2009 |
| Poland | 148.5 | 2024 |
| Portugal | 149.5 | 2024 |
| Puerto Rico | 72.1 | 2024 |
| Qatar | 52.1 | 2004 |
| Romania | 132.0 | 2024 |
| Russia | 94.8 | 2020 |
| Rwanda | 21.8 | 2012 |
| Saint Kitts and Nevis | 288.2 | 2024 |
| Saint Lucia | 376.4 | 2022 |
| Scotland | 164.5 | 2023 |
| Senegal | 0.3 | 2016 |
| Serbia | 101.2 | 2024 |
| Sierra Leone | 10.6 | 2008 |
| Singapore | 2.0 | 2024 |
| Slovakia | 60.4 | 2024 |
| Slovenia | 335.7 | 2024 |
| Solomon Islands | 74.9 | 2008 |
| South Korea | 20.1 | 2024 |
| Spain | 297.6 | 2024 |
| Sri Lanka | 36.3 | 2018 |
| St. Vincent and Grenadines | 476.1 | 2024 |
| Suriname | 467.8 | 2022 |
| Sweden | 597.8 | 2024 |
| Switzerland | 516.4 | 2024 |
| Syria | 8.5 | 2018 |
| Tajikistan | 7.8 | 2011 |
| Tanzania | 26.1 | 2015 |
| Thailand | 4.4 | 2016 |
| Trinidad and Tobago | 117.2 | 2020 |
| Turkey | 58.7 | 2024 |
| Uganda | 19.8 | 2016 |
| Ukraine | 60.6 | 2020 |
| United Arab Emirates | 4.2 | 2022 |
| United States | 268.5 | 2022 |
| Uruguay | 255.0 | 2004 |
| Vatican City | 5650.9 | 2024 |
| Zimbabwe | 363.8 | 2008 |

== See also ==
- Bulgaria
- Crime statistics
- Gentleman thief
- R v Collins
- Trespass
- Home invasion or hot prowl burglary
- Going equipped
- Theft Act 1968 (United Kingdom)
- "Cat burglar" at Wiktionary
- Ram-raiding
