= Léon Ortiz =

French anarchist and figure in illegalism (1868–1955)

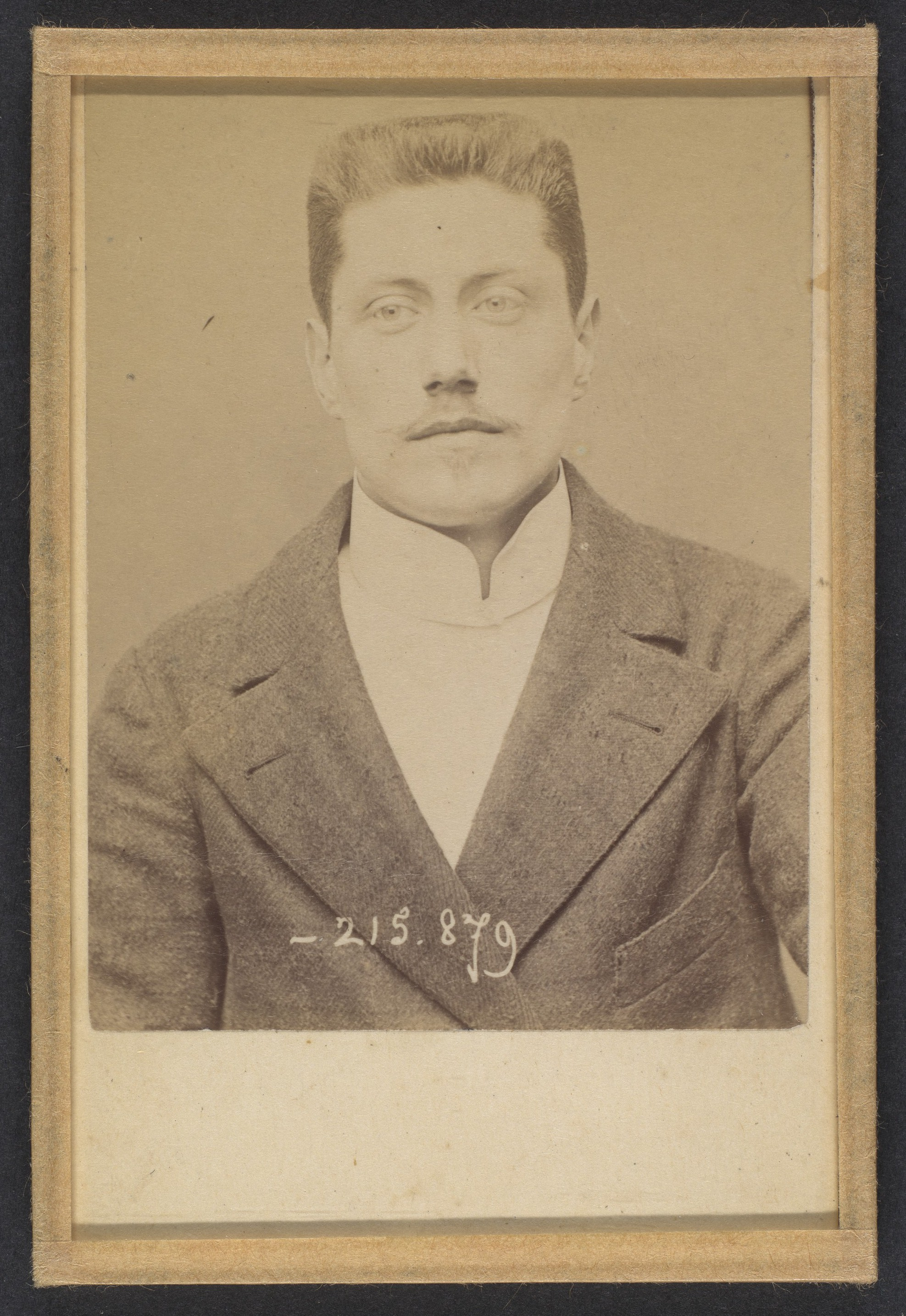
- Ortiz's mugshot taken by Alphonse Bertillon (Anthropometric File of Anarchists - 1894)
- Born: Léon Schiroky; 18 November 1868; Paris, France
- Died: 5 May 1955; Wilmington, Delaware
- Other name: Rocambole of Anarchy
- Citizenship: France; Mexico; United States
- Education: Biology and economics (middle school level)
- Occupations: accountant burglar anarchist
- Years active: 1880s–1890s
- Known for: Illegalist activism
- Height: 179 cm (5 ft 10 in)
- Movement: Anarchism
- Opponent: Bourgeoisie
- Criminal penalty: 15 years in deportation
- Spouse: Antoinette Cazal (1894)
- Parents: Unknown (biological) Philippe Ortiz (adoption) (father); Eva Schiroky (mother)

Léon Ortiz (born Léon Schiroky; 18 November 1868 – 5 May 1955) was a French-Mexican accountant, burglar, and anarchist militant. He is particularly known for his involvement in the rise of illegalism, of which he was a prominent figure with his group, the Ortiz gang.

Son of Eva Schiroky and orphaned from his father as a child, he grew up in poverty before gradually turning to anarchist activism. In this context, he became politically active with his friends Louise Michel, Charles Malato, and Jacques Prolo, a group that founded La Révolution Cosmopolite, a 1880s anarchist publication in France. Later, as a contributor to l'Endehors, he met Émile Henry, who became his friend. After joining the nascent illegalist movement through his contact with the Intransigeants of London and Paris and Vittorio Pini, Ortiz embarked on a significant series of burglaries and robberies with his group, the Ortiz Gang —all while evading the police across Western Europe. According to French authorities of the period, he may have funded Émile Henry to commit the Café Terminus bombing.

Arrested with Antoinette Cazal, his partner, he was put on trial and specifically targeted by the Trial of the Thirty, being one of the few to be convicted, while all other anarchists were acquitted. Sentenced to fifteen years of deportation to the Guyane penal colony, he abandoned anarchism and collaborated with French authorities there before being released. In 1901, he left France and traveled to New York. In 1925, Ortiz obtained American citizenship in Wilmington, where he died in 1955.

== Biography ==
=== Youth and beginning his militancy ===
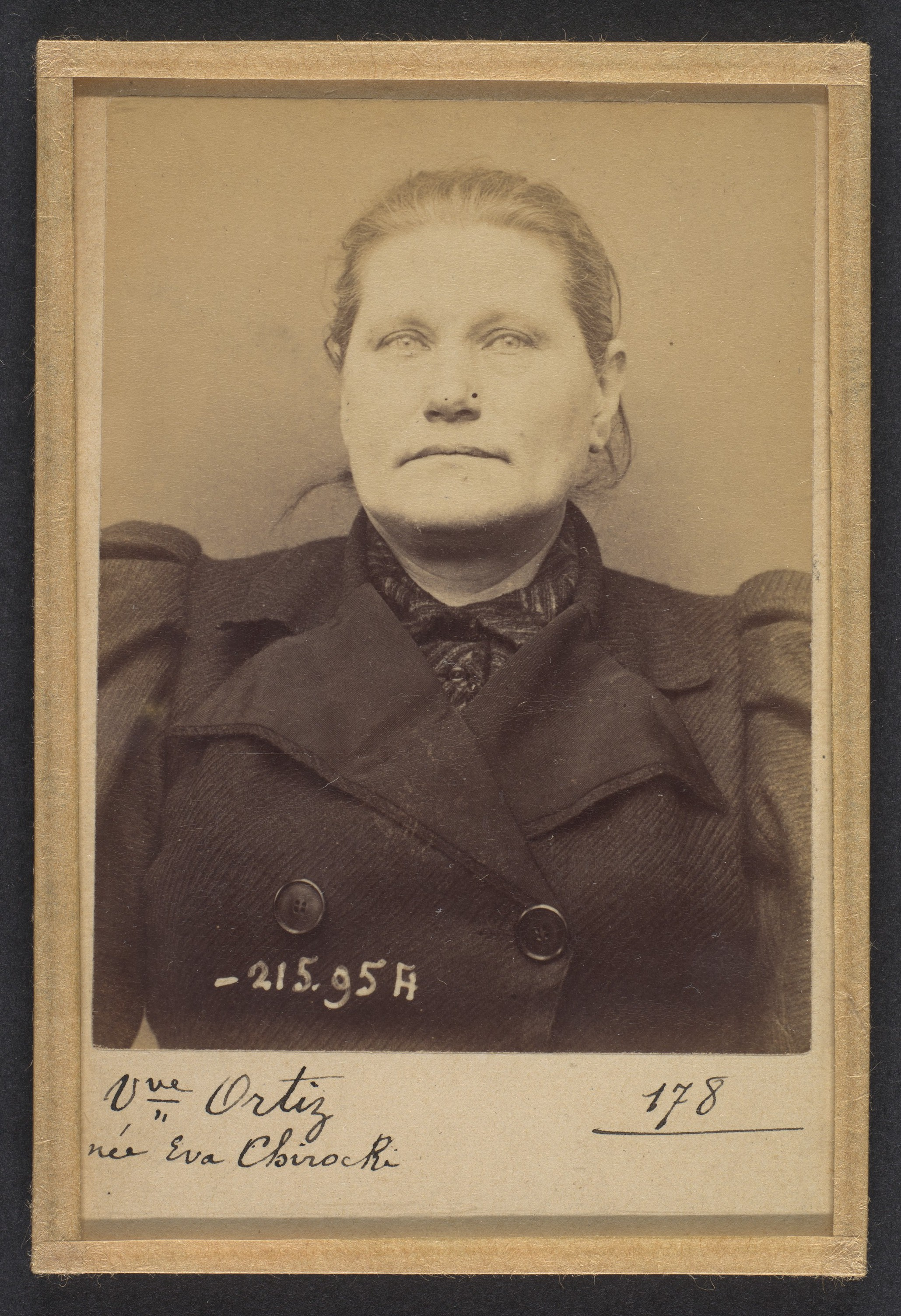
Eva Schiroky's mugshot taken by Alphonse Bertillon (1894)

Léon Schiroky was born in Paris on 18 November 1868. His mother, Eva Schiroky, an Austrian cook and anarchist activist, registered his birth alone, and he grew up without a father. In 1886, Eva Schiroky married Philippe Ortiz, a Mexican valet twelve years her junior, who officially adopted Léon. Schiroky studied at Collège Chaptal, focusing on "biology and political economy", according to Le Maitron.

During his studies, Ortiz joined several intellectual youth circles, notably Le Coup de Feu and the Cercle de la Butte. It was in the latter that he connected with other burgeoning anarchist militants, including Charles Malato or Jacques Prolo. He also met and became friends with Louise Michel. With this group of activists, Ortiz co-founded La Révolution Cosmopolite, serving as a key author and a member of the editorial committee. He notably published the journal's Manifesto. Although the group's members, including Ortiz who was the poorest among them, were still defining their anarchist views, he was likely the first to fully embrace anarchism and influence the others, except for Louise Michel, who was already an anarchist.

Ortiz continued to collaborate with Malato, and they published several other periodicals in the following years. Ortiz was also associated with the Ligue Cosmopolite alongside Malato.

=== Illegalism and arrest ===
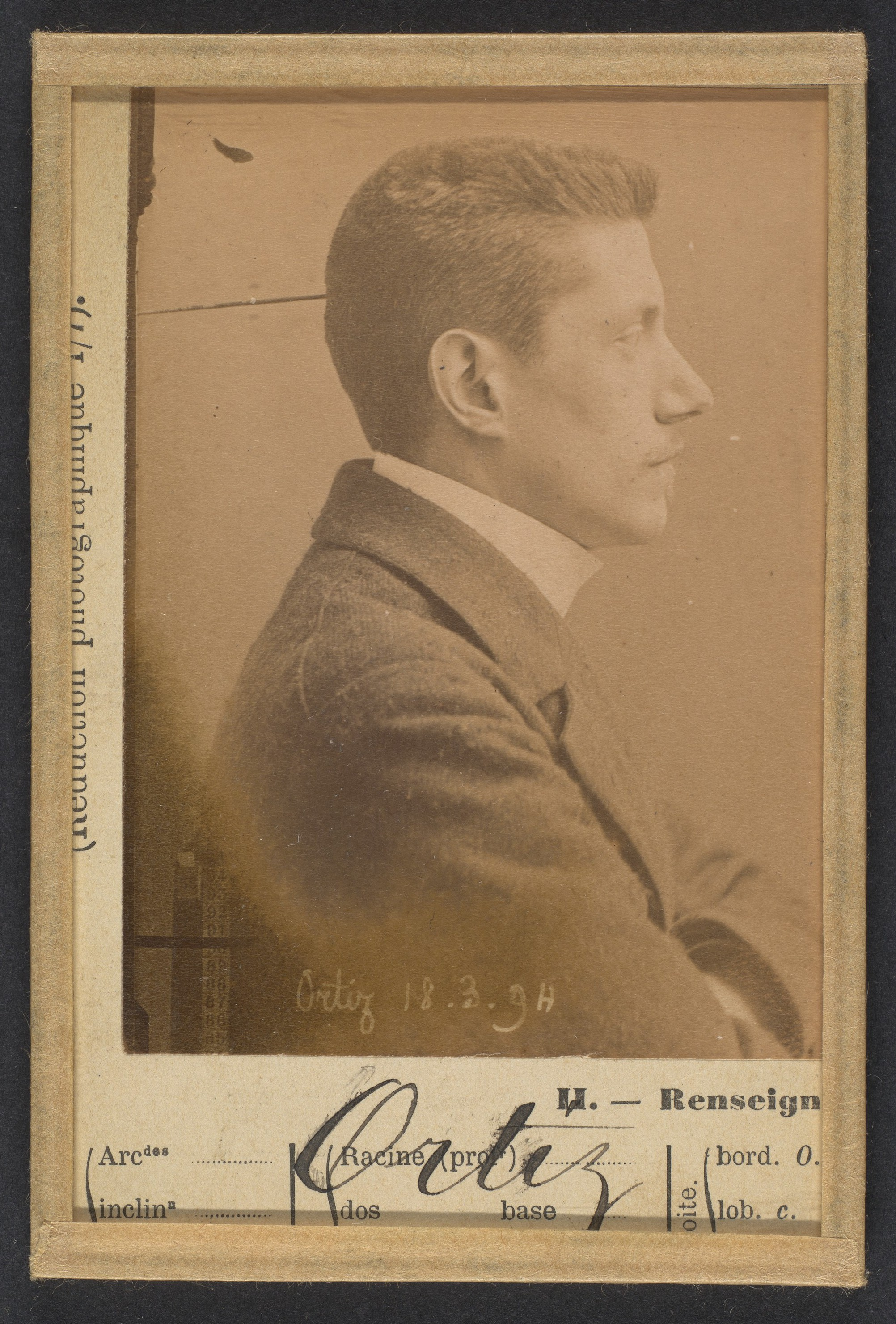
Profile of Ortiz in Bertillon's mugshot file (1894)

Between 1886 and 1890, Léon Ortiz met Vittorio Pini and Luigi Parmeggiani, who founded the Intransigeants of London and Paris group. Through his association with them, Ortiz adopted illegalism. This choice, however, didn't mean he abandoned broader social goals. For instance, he continued to support anarchist participation in the May Day demonstrations, viewing them as a good way to spark the Revolution. In 1890, Ortiz wrote in La Tribune libre in London with other militants, a journal inspired by Le Père Peinard.

Ortiz welcomed numerous fellow anarchists passing through and met Émile Henry within the circles orbiting l'Endehors (1891–1893). He even recommended Henry to his employer, an ornamentalist named Dupuy, who hired Henry. The encounter with Placide Schouppe, another notable illegalist of that era, ultimately convinced Ortiz to take direct action.

On the night of 13–14 August 1892, Ortiz and Schouppe carried out a "significant" burglary in Abbeville, stealing over 400,000 francs worth of titles. In January 1893, while Émile Henry was on the run after the Carmaux-Bons Enfants bombing, the two reunited. In connection with the Intransigeants, they committed another burglary in Fiquefleur-Équainville, this time stealing 800,000 francs in titles. Ortiz also participated in a burglary on 29 January 1893, in Nogent-les-Vierges.

Following this series of burglaries, Ortiz disappeared and moved within underground circles in Paris, London, Brussels, Perpignan, and Barcelona, where he spent part of 1893. When Schouppe was arrested, the police also sought to apprehend Ortiz, but he managed to evade capture and hide at the home of his partner, the anarchist militant Antoinette Cazal.

Ortiz became actively sought by the police after Émile Henry's Café Terminus bombing. French authorities suspected him of two things: first, of having given Henry 100 francs to create his bomb, and second, of having gone with Louis Matha and Désiré Pauwels to remove bomb materials from Henry's residence before the police arrived. However, the police later dismissed the second hypothesis as Ortiz was in London at the time of that incident.

After Cazal's arrest on 28 February 1894, Ortiz himself was arrested during a police raid on the building occupied by members of his group. According to Le Maitron, the illegalist militants arrested alongside him, part of the Ortiz Gang, included: Paol Chiericotti and Annette Soubrier (a couple), Victorina Trucano and her son Louis, Maria Zanini and her partner Orsini Bertani, and François Liégeois. It was at this time that the press dubbed him the "Rocambole of Anarchy".

=== Trial and deportation ===
Léon Ortiz was subsequently put on trial during the Trial of the Thirty, which targeted thirty prominent figures of anarchism in France. This was a political trial orchestrated after the assassination of Sadi Carnot by Sante Caserio, with the aim of convicting them. However, contrary to expectations, the jurors acquitted all the accused, with the exception of Ortiz and the members of his gang. Ortiz received the harshest sentence: 15 years of deportation to a penal colony. According to Jean Grave, who was acquitted at the same trial, the gang members reportedly quarreled amongst themselves, attempting to shift blame for the burglaries onto former friends, some of whom even testified against them. Ortiz, however, denied everything, declaring that theft was a legitimate revolutionary weapon, and was ultimately convicted. His conviction was made possible because French authorities, in their lois scélérates ('villainous laws') targeting the anarchist movement, drew a distinction between "ideologues" and "propagandists". The latter, like Ortiz, were far more severely punished.

After marrying Cazal, Ortiz was deported to French Guiana. According to Liard-Courtois, he gradually rejected anarchism while in the penal colony. He began to cooperate with penitentiary authorities, for instance, by requesting permission to attend Catholic services on Sundays. He even needed protection from other anarchist companions by Clément Duval. According to Duval, Ortiz abandoned anarchism and betrayed his comrades by writing to French authorities, including prosecutor Léon Bulot. In these letters, he declared his renunciation of anarchism and insulted anarchists. This betrayal reportedly greatly displeased Théodule Meunier and Marchand, who allegedly tried to assassinate him. However, Duval would have dissuaded them, arguing that killing such an "unclean carrion" wasn't worth dying for.

Ortiz was supposedly aware of the hatred other anarchists harbored for him due to his betrayal. Knowing that they would attack him if he got close, he reportedly approached Marchand one day. Marchand told him to leave, but Ortiz claimed a guard had placed him there, which was apparently a lie. Marchand then allegedly struck him very violently in the face before guards separated them and sent Marchand to solitary confinement for two months.

The penitentiary authorities moved him to Île Royale for his safety before he was eventually released.

=== Last years and death ===
On 3 September 1898, Ortiz embarked for France. He left France in 1901 for New York. In 1925, Ortiz obtained American citizenship in Wilmington, Delaware. He died there on 5 May 1955.

== Works ==
La Révolution Cosmopolite (1886–1887), including :

- Manifeste du Groupe cosmopolite aux révolutionnaires étrangers, 1887 (Issue 1, Series 2)
- Guerre à la guerre !, 1887 (Issue 2, Series 2)

== Bibliography ==
- Bach Jensen, Richard (2015). The Battle against Anarchist Terrorism: An International History, 1878–1934. Cambridge: Cambridge University Press (CUP). ISBN 978-1-107-03405-1.
- Badier, Walter (2010), "Émile Henry, le « Saint-Just de l'Anarchie »" [Émile Henry, the 'Saint-Just of Anarchy'], Parlement[s] (in French), vol. 14, no. 2, Paris: Revue d'histoire politique, pp. 159–171, doi:10.3917/parl.014.0159
- Duval, Clément (1929), Memorie autobiografiche (in Italian), Newark: Biblioteca de L'Adunata dei refrattari, OCLC 2314088
- Merriman, John M. (2016). The dynamite club: how a bombing in fin-de-siècle Paris ignited the age of modern terror. Yale University Press. ISBN 978-0-300-21792-6.
