= Paolo Chiericotti =

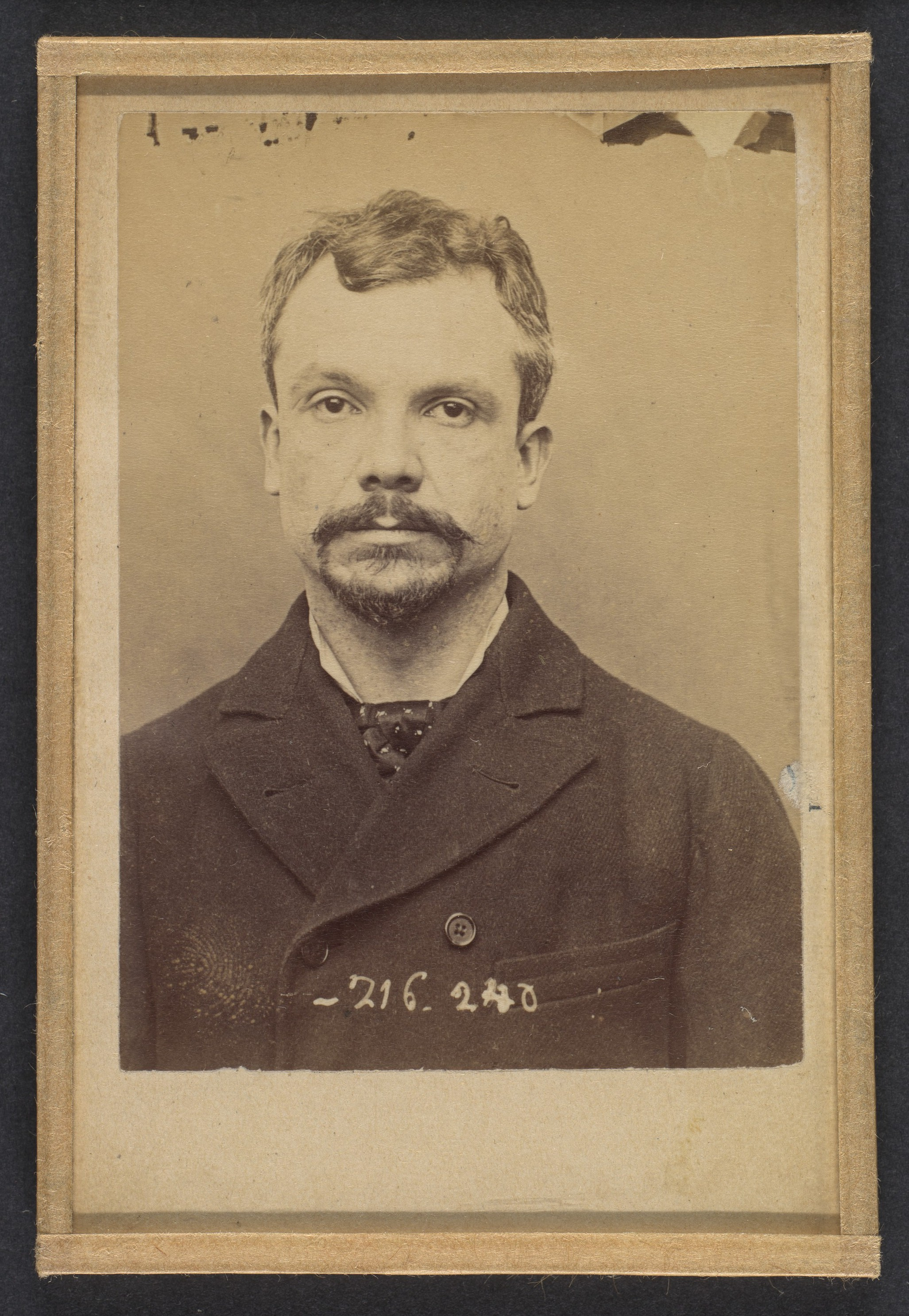
- Chiericotti's mugshot taken by Alphonse Bertillon in 1894
- Born: 1 March 1858; Milan, Italy
- Died: 13 June 1920 (aged 62); Caracas, Venezuela
- Citizenship: Italy
- Occupations: shoemaker burglar anarchist
- Years active: 1880s–1890s
- Known for: Illegalist activism
- Movement: Anarchism
- Opponent: Bourgeoisie
- Criminal penalty: 8 years in deportation
- Spouse: Annette Soubrier (m. 1885)

Paolo Chiericotti or Paul Chiericotti (1858–1920) was an Italian shoemaker, poultry seller, and illegalist anarchist. He is known for his possible involvement in the Berthe bombing and Terminus bombings, his actions during the rise of illegalism, of which he was a notable figure, and his condemnation at the Trial of the Thirty.

Born in Milan, he moved to France, where he married Annette Soubrier, and became involved in French anarchist circles. Following the Berthe bombing, a bomb attack targeting one of his former landlords with whom he had disputes, Chiericotti was arrested but later released due to lack of evidence. He then integrated into the emerging illegalist circles, associating with Vittorio Pini, one of its main founders, and subsequently joining the Ortiz gang through his contact with Léon Ortiz.

Arrested in early 1894, he was prosecuted during the Trial of the Thirty, a political trial targeting the anarchist movement, and was one of the few defendants to be convicted. He was then deported to a penal colony where he served his eight-year sentence until 1900. He died in Caracas, Venezuela, in 1920.

== Biography ==
=== Youth and emigration to France ===
Paolo Chiericotti was born on 1 March 1858, in Milan. He joined the anarchist movement and then moved to Paris at the age of twenty-five, in 1883. Chiericotti married Annette Soubrier there two years later, in 1885.

=== Berthe bombing ===
He worked as a shoemaker with Italian anarchist companions, Constant Magnani, who was his wedding witness, another militant named Pietro (Pierre) Figeri, and a certain Pogni. They were part of an Italian Anarchist Group of the Panthéon and the Ligue des antipropriétaires ('League of Anti-Owners'). They lived in furnished rooms rented to them by a certain Viguier, with whom they had multiple conflicts.

At the beginning of 1887, the shoemakers decided to stop paying him, and when he tried to evict them – or when they attempted a "déménagement à la cloche de bois", meaning they tried to leave the lodging without informing him or paying him – he was violently struck in the face. The anarchists allegedly uttered death threats against him, and he filed a complaint against them.

On 5 July 1887, two days after Pogni's condemnation to four months in prison following the complaint, a stick of dynamite was placed under the window of the landlord's room and exploded, taking with it part of the shop's facade: this was the rue Berthe bombing.

Given that the three militants were suspected, they were arrested and their premises searched. The police found gunpowder at Jogeri's place, but they could justify their presence at home and were therefore provisionally released.

=== Illegalism and Ortiz Gang ===
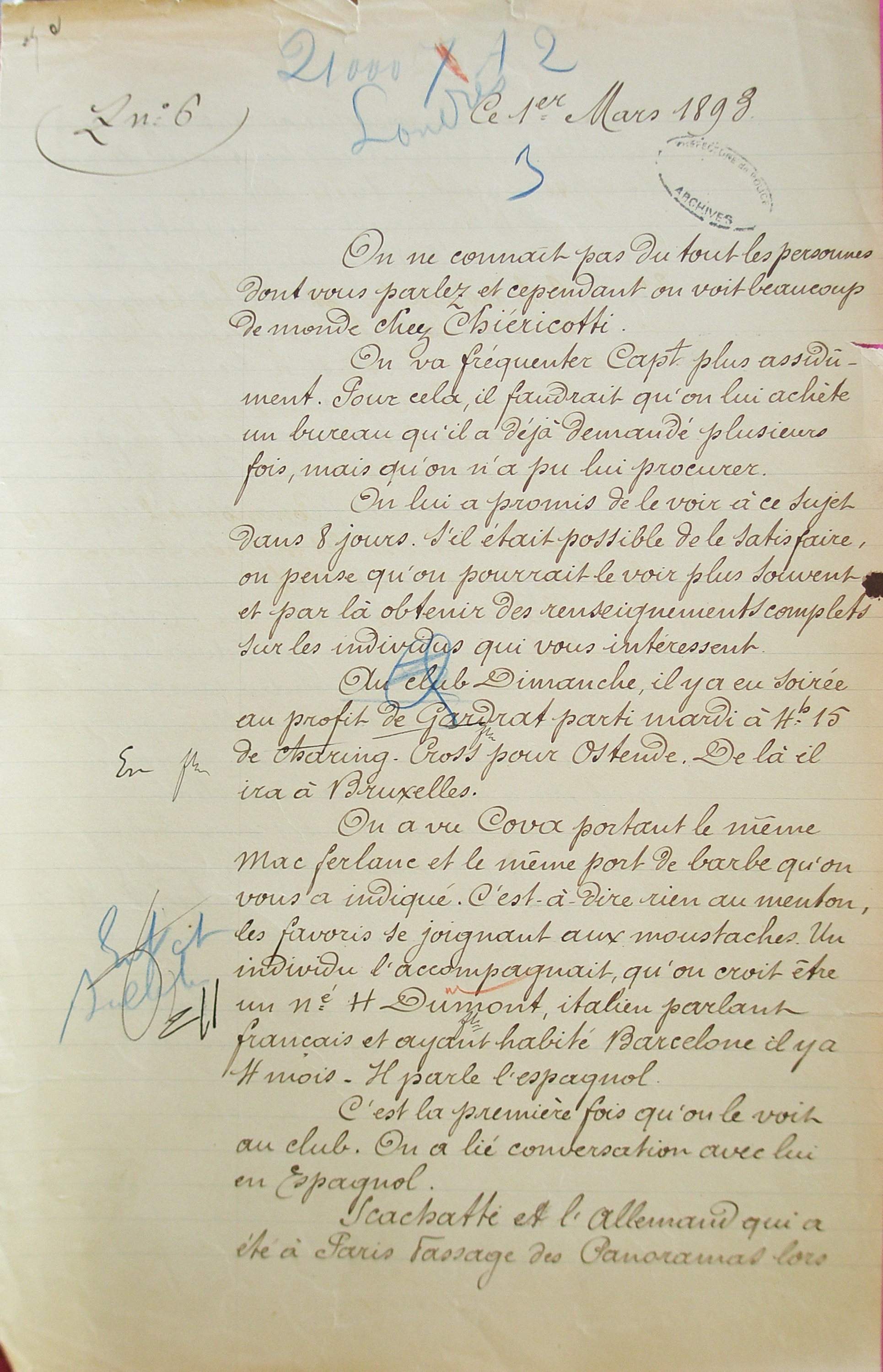
Police informant giving information on people going to Paul Chiericotti's home (courtesy of Archives anarchistes)

Following his release, Chiericotti established connections with Vittorio Pini, founder of illegalism. He became a poultry seller during this period.

On 29 March 1892, an expulsion order was issued against him, but it could not be served because he was in London – where he was probably joined by Soubrier and their child. He returned to France under the false identity of 'Paul Laurent' and joined Léon Ortiz and the Ortiz gang. According to historian Rolf Dupuy, it is probable that he participated in the burglaries carried out by the gang on :

- 13 August 1892 in Abbeville (Somme)
- 7 January 1893 in Fiquefleur (Eure)
- 29 January 1893 in Nogent-les-Vierges (Oise)
- July 1893, rue de Longchamp in Paris

In October 1893, Chiericotti settled with other members of the gang, Soubrier, Maria Zanini, Orsini Bertani, Victorina Trucano, and her son Louis, at 1 Boulevard Brune. He was arrested on 27 March 1894 when he went to see his partner.

=== Trial of the Thirty ===
Chiericotti was then put on trial during the Trial of the Thirty, a political trial targeting thirty prominent anarchist figures in France. This trial followed the assassination of Sadi Carnot by Sante Caserio, with authorities aiming to condemn both illegalist members of the Ortiz gang and anarchist theoreticians.

According to historians Guillaume Davranche and Dominique Petit, Ortiz and Chiericotti were accused of having "been part of a secret action group based in London whose aim was burglary on the continent".

Against expectations, the jury acquitted all but a few of the accused. Ortiz received the harshest sentence, 15 years of deportation to a penal colony, while Chiericotti was among the few others convicted, receiving an eight-year sentence of deportation to a penal colony.

=== Deportation and final years ===
The anarchist was deported to the penal colony of the Îles du Salut in French Guiana, where he met Auguste Liard-Courtois and made him shoes from an old hammock. He received a one-year pardon in 1900 and was relegated in 1901. He died in the San Juan neighbourhood of Caracas, capital of Venezuela, under the name 'Pablo Chiericotti' on 13 June 1920. He didn't receive religious sacraments and was married at the time of his death.

== Legacy ==
=== Police mugshots ===
His police mugshots are part of the collections of the Metropolitan Museum of Art (MET).

== Bibliography ==
- Bach Jensen, Richard (2015). The Battle against Anarchist Terrorism: An International History, 1878–1934. Cambridge: Cambridge University Press (CUP). ISBN 978-1-107-03405-1.
- Davranche, Guillaume; Petit, Dominique (2024), "CHIERICOTTI Paul [Pierre, Paul, Jacques, dit ; aussi Chericotti, Ricotti, Paul LAURENT", Dictionnaire des anarchistes (Le Maitron), Paris: Le Maitron des anarchistes
- Dupuy, Rolf (2025), "CHIERICOTTI, Pierre, Paul, Jacques "RICOTTI" ; "Paul LAURENT"", Dictionnaire international des militants anarchistes, Paris
