= Ortiz gang =

Western European illegalist anarchist group

Ortiz Gang
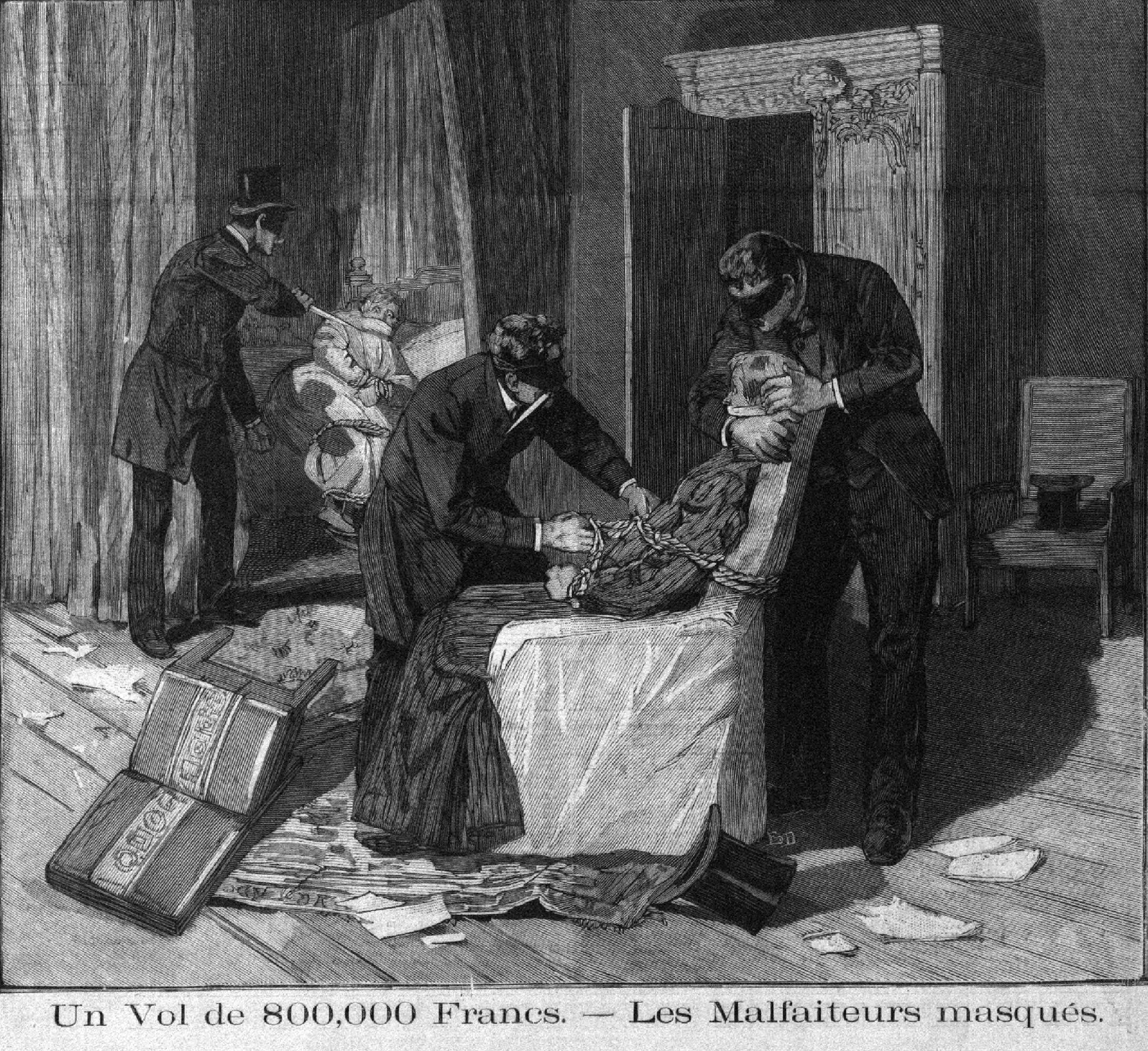
- Romanced depiction of the Fiquefleur burglary by Chiericotti (?), Ortiz and Henry in Le Petit Parisien
- Dates active: first half of 1890s
- Active regions: Western Europe
- Ideology: Anarchism; Individualist anarchism; Illegalism
- Political position: Far-left
- Status: Defunct

The Ortiz Gang or the Ortiz Band was an illegalist anarchist group active in Western Europe in the early 1890s. The gang is known for its series of burglaries, its influence on the emergence and development of illegalism, following Vittorio Pini's Intransigents of London and Paris, and its central role in the Trial of the Thirty.

Composed of French and Italian anarchist militants, often in pairs, the gang formed around Léon Ortiz in the first half of the 1890s. Its members included Annette Soubrier-Paolo Chiericotti, Antoinette Cazal, Orsini Bertani-Maria Zanini, and Victorina Trucano and her son, Luigi, among others. In late 1892 and early 1893, Ortiz and Émile Henry, at least, participated in burglaries together in Northern France. In October 1893, several gang members moved into 1st Avenue Brune together, where they stored stolen goods from their burglaries.

Shortly after Henry's Café Terminus bombing, the police raided the gang's hideouts, arresting the members found there. They were subsequently tried during the Trial of the Thirty, a political trial targeting the anarchist movement in France, which implicated the Ortiz gang alongside theorists and "major figures" of the anarchist movement. During the trial, the prosecution primarily focused on the gang. While the jurors acquitted most of the accused, Ortiz (15 years of penal servitude), Chiericotti (8 years of penal servitude), and Bertani (6 months in prison) were the only ones convicted.

== History ==
=== Context ===
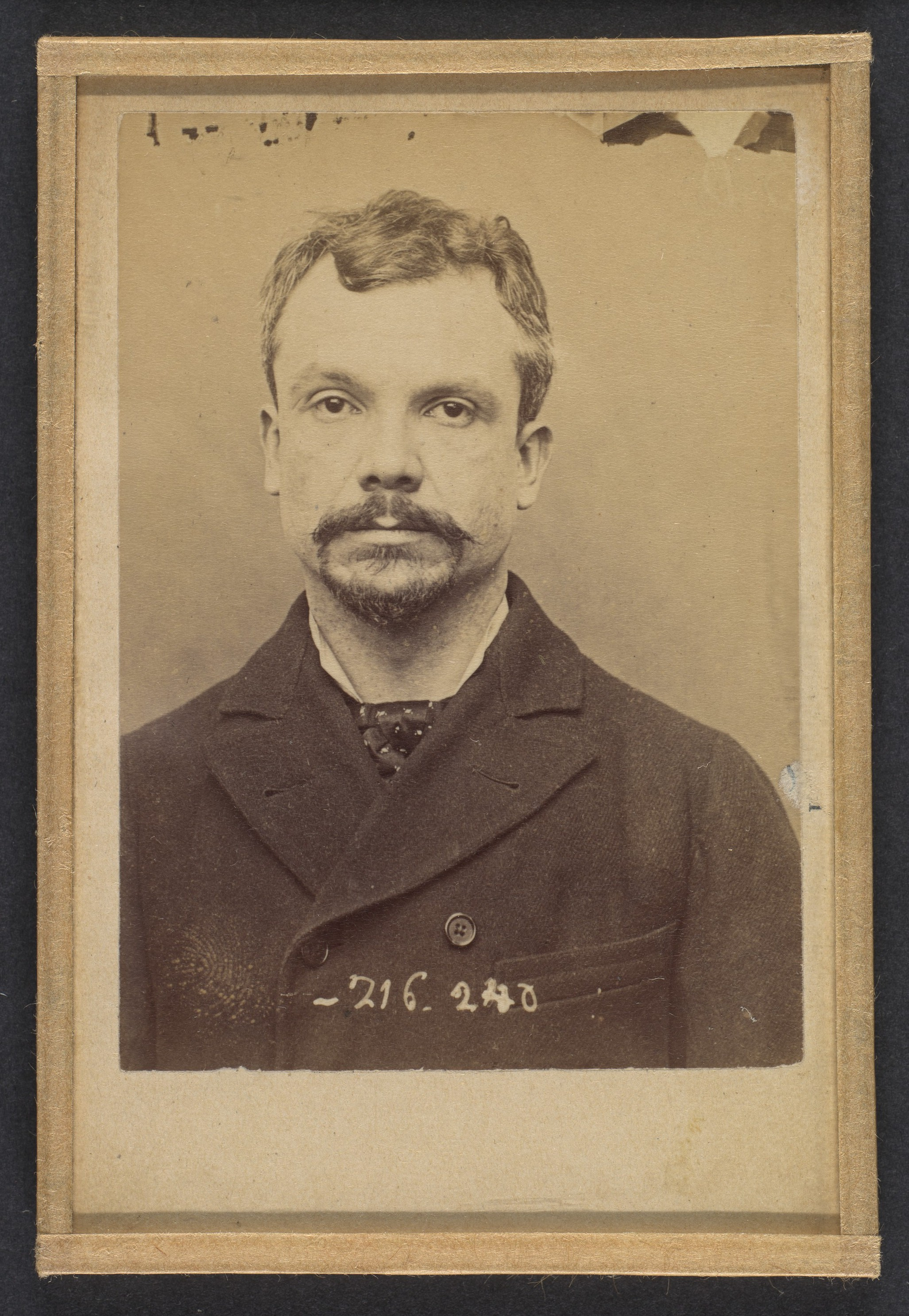
Paolo Chiericotti's mugshot taken by Alphonse Bertillon in 1894

In the 19th century, anarchism emerged and developed in Europe before spreading globally. Anarchists advocated for the struggle against all perceived forms of unjust domination, including economic domination arising from the development of capitalism. They were particularly opposed to the State, viewing it as the institution that sanctioned many of these dominations through its police, army, and propaganda.

However, despite the anarchist movement's outwardly open stance, it remained largely closed off to the social demands of certain groups, like ex-convicts. In fact, having a criminal record could lead to exclusion from the movement.

This situation began to change in the latter half of the 1880s when anarchists Clément Duval (1887) and Vittorio Pini (1889) were arrested and tried. Both militants were ex-convicts involved in burglaries. They developed the foundations of the illegalist anarchist tendency and one of its core tenets: individual reclamation. This was the idea that it was legitimate to steal from capitalists, given that capitalists would steal from the people. Both Duval and Pini were sentenced to harsh terms of penal servitude and deported to French Guiana.

=== Formation and activities ===
Before his arrest and conviction, Pini and his group, the Intransigeants of London and Paris, were connected to and influenced a number of anarchists in France. He specifically associated with Léon Ortiz and Paolo Chiericotti, two future members of the Ortiz gang. From at least 1892, Ortiz and other militants began to gather and carry out a series of burglaries in France. In late 1892 and early 1893, Ortiz, Chiericotti, and Émile Henry—who was then on the run after the Carmaux-Bons Enfants bombing—reunited and likely committed burglaries in Northern France, using Belgium and London as bases. Historian Rolf Dupuy identifies at least these burglaries between 1892 and 1893:

- 13 August 1892 in Abbeville (Somme)
- 7 January 1893 in Fiquefleur (Eure)
- 29 January 1893 in Nogent-les-Vierges (Oise)
- July 1893, Rue de Longchamp in Paris

Throughout 1893, Ortiz traveled extensively in Western Europe, visiting Barcelona, Brussels, London and Perpignan, among other places. He is suspected of having funded Émile Henry's propaganda of the deed activities during this period French public opinion called l'Ère des attentats (1892-1894).

London, in particular, served as a crucial hub for fencing the goods stolen by the gang. The management of these stolen items appears to have been handled by the female militants of the gang, including Victorina Trucano, Maria Zanini, Antoinette Cazal, and possibly Annette Soubrier, who frequently traveled between Paris and London during this period.

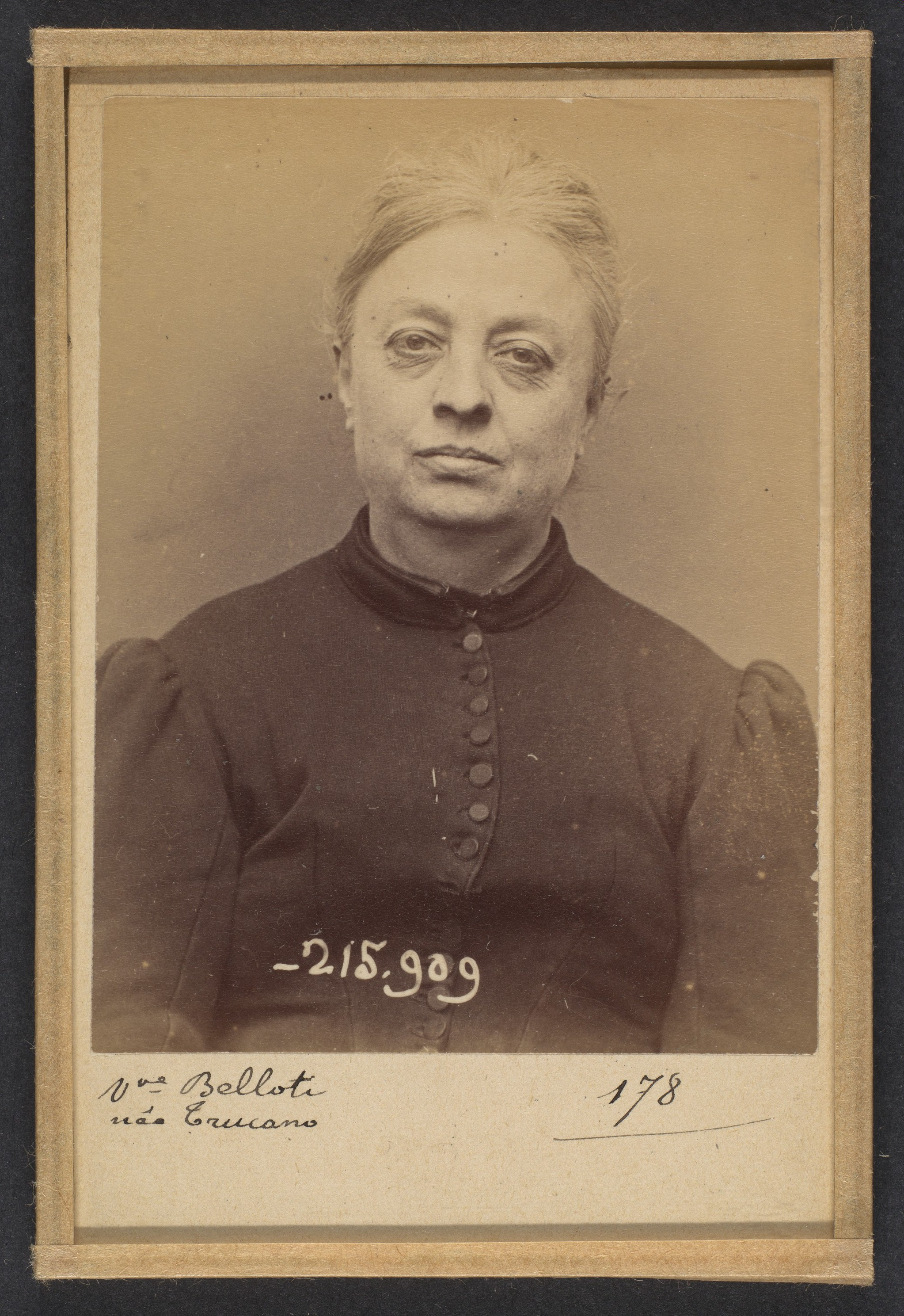
Victorina Trucano's mugshot taken by Alphonse Bertillon in 1894

In October 1893, several group members gathered at 1st Avenue Brune in Paris, where the stolen goods were stored before being fenced. At this meeting point, members lived in pairs: Soubrier and Chiericotti, Cazal and Ortiz, Zanini and Orsini Bertani, and Trucano and her son, Luigi Belloti.

=== Arrests ===
Between February and March 1894, following the Café Terminus bombing and the repression of early 1894, members of the gang were targeted by police raids, particularly at their homes at 1st Avenue Brune—where the police arrested most of the members. Chiericotti was arrested while picking up Soubrier at the Gare de Lyon, and police found a diamond brooch on her during her arrest—possibly intended for fencing.

=== Trial of the Thirty and sentences ===
The gang members were then put on trial during the Trial of the Thirty, which targeted thirty anarchist figures in France intended for conviction in a political trial following the assassination of Sadi Carnot by Sante Caserio. The authorities linked the illegalists of the Ortiz gang with anarchist theorists. Ortiz and Chiericotti were accused of "being part of a secret action group based in London whose purpose was burglary on the continent", according to historians Guillaume Davranche and Dominique Petit.

According to Jean Grave, also an accused in the trial, the gang members reportedly argued and blamed each other. Despite his criticisms of illegalism, he empathized with Chiericotti due to his status as a poor worker and stated that he believed him innocent or minimally involved in the gang's actions.

Contrary to expectations, the jurors acquitted almost all the accused, with the exception of Ortiz, who received the harshest sentence (15 years of penal servitude), Chiericotti, who was sentenced to eight years of penal servitude, and Bertani, who received six months in prison for carrying prohibited weapons.

== Legacy ==
=== Police mugshots ===
Police mugshots of the group members arrested in 1894 are held at the Metropolitan Museum of Art (MET) and the Archives de la préfecture de police de Paris (Yb 28).

== Bibliography ==
- Bach Jensen, Richard (2015). The Battle against Anarchist Terrorism: An International History, 1878–1934. Cambridge: Cambridge University Press (CUP). ISBN 978-1-107-03405-1.
- Bouhey, Vivien (2008), Les Anarchistes contre la République [The Anarchists against the Republic] (in French), Rennes: Presses universitaires de Rennes (PUR), ISBN 9782753507272
- Badier, Walter (2010), "Émile Henry, le « Saint-Just de l'Anarchie »" [Émile Henry, the 'Saint-Just of Anarchy'], Parlement[s] (in French), vol. 14, no. 2, Paris: Revue d'histoire politique, pp. 159–171, doi:10.3917/parl.014.0159
- Jourdain, Edouard (2013). L'anarchisme [Anarchism] (in French). Paris: La Découverte. ISBN 978-2-7071-9091-8.
- Ward, Colin (2004). Anarchism: A Very Short Introduction. Oxford University Press (OUP).
