= Annette Soubrier =

French seamstress, poultry seller, and illegalist anarchist

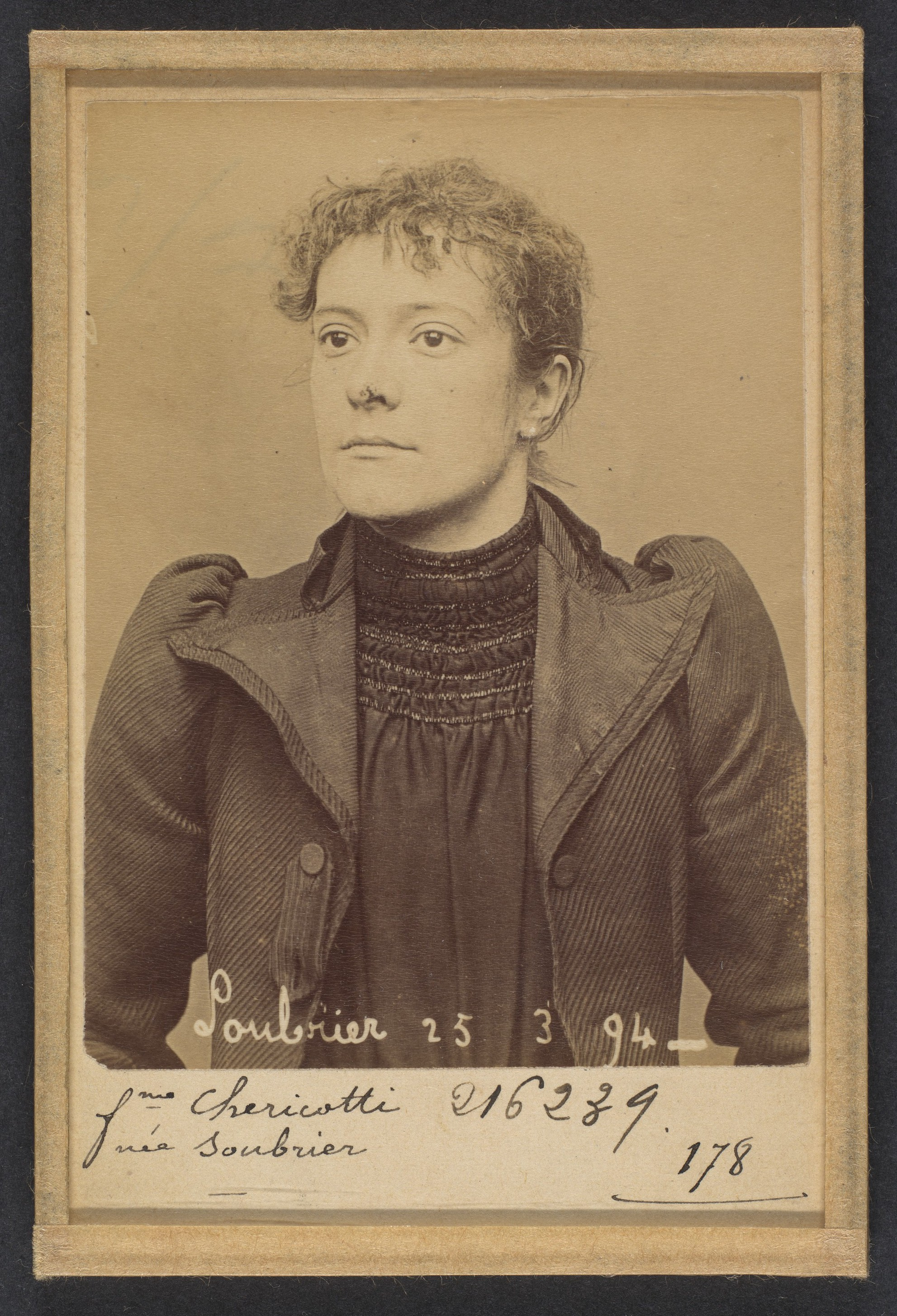
- Soubrier's mugshot taken by Alphonse Bertillon in 1894
- Born: 30 August 1865; Paris, France
- Died: April–June 1951 (aged 85); Hemel Hempstead, England
- Citizenship: France
- Occupations: seamstress fencer ? anarchist
- Known for: Illegalist activism
- Movement: Anarchism
- Opponent: Bourgeoisie
- Criminal penalty: Acquitted at the Trial of the Thirty
- Spouse: Paul Chiericotti (m. 1885)

Annette Soubrier (1865–1951) was a French seamstress, poultry seller, and illegalist anarchist. She is known for her involvement during the rise of illegalism, when she joined the Ortiz gang, and for being accused in the Trial of the Thirty.

Orphaned at a young age, Soubrier married Paul Chiericotti and, with him, became integrated into French illegalist circles, joining one of these groups, the Ortiz gang. She was arrested after rejoining Chiericotti from London and put on trial during the Trial of the Thirty, a political trial targeting the anarchist movement in France. However, while her husband was convicted, the court gave little attention to her case, and she was acquitted. Soubrier subsequently moved to the United Kingdom, settling in London, where she remained until her death in 1951.

Although she was acquitted, her role within the Ortiz gang has been re-evaluated and amplified by more recent historians, who view her—and her multiple trips between London and Paris—as a potentially important figure in the fencing of the gang's stolen goods.

== Biography ==
=== Youth and anarchism ===
Annette Soubrier was born in the 3rd arrondissement of Paris on 30 August 1865. She was the youngest daughter of Antoinette Vincent and Géraud Soubrier, who worked as second-hand dealers and ran a small hotel in Paris. Around the age of three, her mother died, and Soubrier was raised by her father and one of her aunts, Marianne Vincent. Marianne Vincent was the widow of a Communard and remarried a carpenter with anarchist sympathies, Jean-Baptiste Lenfant.

Soubrier married the Italian anarchist Paul Chiericotti on 21 February 1885, in Paris. Her uncle, Charles Vincent, served as a witness, while Chiericotti was represented by the Italian companion Constant Magnani. In the years that followed, the couple had four children, and she became involved in her husband's activities, such as working as a poultry vendor. She joined him in London during his exile in 1892 with their youngest daughter, Ida, who had just been born.

=== Illegalism ===
Chiericotti then re-entered France under a false identity to join the Ortiz gang, named after Léon Ortiz, which was involved in burglaries. According to a police informant, Soubrier—who was staying with Louis Bergues—believed Chiericotti had abandoned her and their daughter and was trying to return to France.

In any case, she eventually rejoined her husband in France in October 1893, when he settled with other gang members at 1 avenue Brune. In March 1894, as she arrived from London at Gare du Nord and Chiericotti came to pick her up, both were arrested by the police—most of the other members were arrested in the following days. She had valuables and jewelry on her when she was arrested.

=== Trial of the Thirty ===
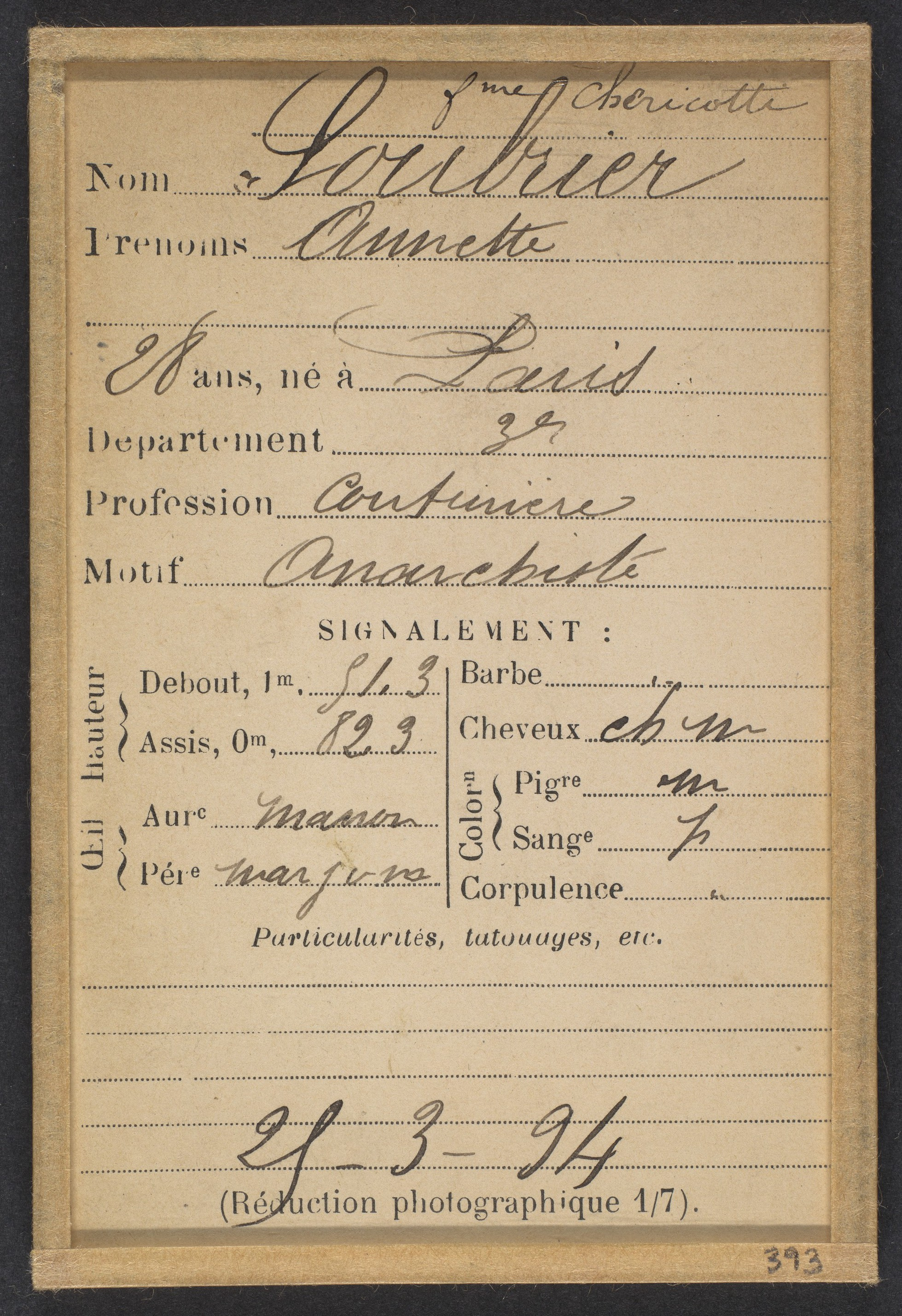
Soubrier's file by Alphonse Bertillon (1894)

Soubrier was then put on trial during the Trial of the Thirty, which targeted thirty anarchist figures in France, intended to be condemned in a political trial after the assassination of Sadi Carnot by Sante Caserio. The authorities mixed illegalists from the Ortiz gang with anarchist theorists. She was accused of complicity in the gang's robberies but argued that the diamond brooch she had on her at the time of arrest was a love token from Chiericotti, among other defenses.

Contrary to expectations, the jurors acquitted all the accused, with the exception of Ortiz, who received the harshest sentence (15 years of deportation to a penal colony), and a few others, including Chiericotti, who was sentenced to eight years of deportation to a penal colony. Soubrier was acquitted.

=== Later years ===
The anarchist, under police surveillance, left France and returned to London, where she settled. She was noted as still living there in 1911 with the anarchist Cesare Cova. She died between April and June 1951 in Hemel Hempstead.

== Legacy ==
=== Role within the Ortiz gang ===
According to historian Dominique Petit, her numerous round trips between London and Paris and her possession of expensive goods at the time of her arrest suggest a more central and important role within the Ortiz gang than the French authorities attributed to her during the trial. London, in fact, served as a point used by illegalists to sell stolen goods from the European continent.

=== Police mugshot ===
Her police mugshot is part of the collections of the Metropolitan Museum of Art (MET).

== Bibliography ==
- Bach Jensen, Richard (2015). The Battle against Anarchist Terrorism: An International History, 1878–1934. Cambridge: Cambridge University Press (CUP). ISBN 978-1-107-03405-1.
- Dupuy, Rolf; Davranche, Guillaume (2025), "CHIERICOTTI, Pierre, Paul, Jacques "RICOTTI"; "Paul LAURENT"", Dictionnaire international des militants anarchistes, Paris
- Petit, Dominique (2024), "SOUBRIER Annette, épouse Chiericotti", Dictionnaire des anarchistes (Le Maitron), Paris: Le Maitron des anarchistes
