= Armand Matha =

French anarchist (1861–1930)

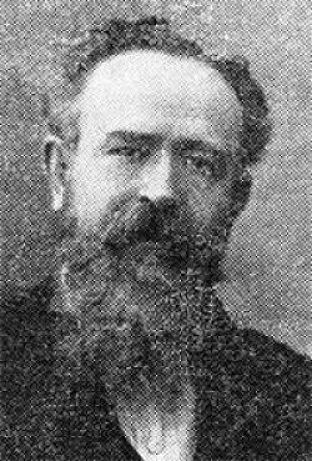
- Born: April 10, 1861; Casteljaloux, France
- Died: February 12, 1930 (aged 68); Draveil, France
- Occupations: Haircutter, publicist
- Known for: Manager of Le Libertaire

Louis Armand Matha (1861–1930) was a French anarchist involved in multiple Parisian newspapers, including over a decade as the manager of Le Libertaire.

== Life ==
Louis Armand Matha was born April 10, 1861, in Casteljaloux, France. His parents were Bonapartists. He did not attend school and taught himself to read. Matha was, in turns, a Gambettist, a Blanquist, and an anarchist. He became a hairdresser, whereupon he met Sébastien Faure in 1887, prior to his fame. The pair traveled together.

Matha began work in Paris in 1891, assisting in Jean Grave's La Révolte and managing several other publications. He served a prison sentence for "incitement to murder" in 1892. Matha lived in London in 1893 to avoid repression. He was involved with Émile Henry and knew in advance of his attack. Matha was arrested following an April 1894 explosion at the Foyot restaurant but ultimately was not connected to the event. He was named and acquitted in the August 1894 Trial of the Thirty.

He participated in the founding of Faure's Le Libertaire in 1895 and managed its activities through 1911, during which time he lived in relative poverty. He was sentenced to prison for 20 days in 1896 in relation to his role with the paper. Matha also joined Faure in founding Le Journal du peuple in 1899, which Matha also ran before managing the monthly Les Hommes de Révolution through mid-1900. During the Dreyfus affair, Matha was an ardent Dreyfusard. He also helped to organize Louise Michel's funeral.

In what was later known as the "Matha affair", the French police attempted to link Le Libertaire with a group of counterfeiters in 1907 after having found a single box of counterfeiting material stored in the publication's offices. Matha and four others were charged. The advocate general withdrew the case against Matha for poor evidence but two from the group were ultimately sentenced and fined. Matha was acquitted in a 1910 trial for incitement to murder and disobedience after he signed a poster for justice in the Aernoult–Rousset affair.

In 1911, Matha lived with Laurentine Sauvraz in Paris. They operated a neo-Malthusian bookstore and sold contraceptives.

During World War I, Matha enlisted as a military nurse but ultimately turned towards pacifism. After the war, he moved with Sauvraz to Draveil where he was active in the school and activities for children.

Matha died on February 12, 1930, in Draveil. He was buried in Père-Lachaise Cemetery.
