= Maria Zanini =

Italian seamstress, cook and anarchist militant

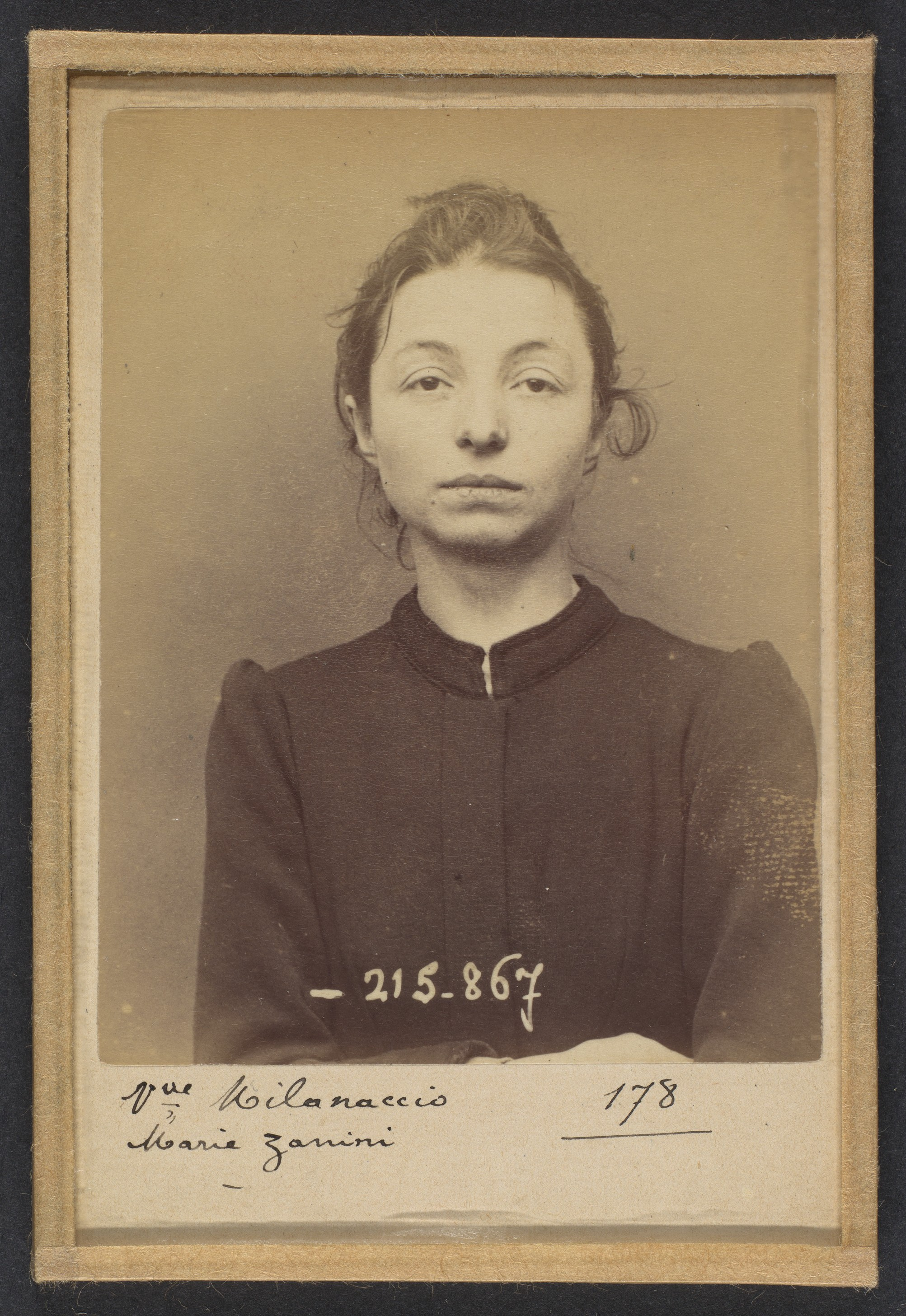
- Zanini's mugshot taken by Alphonse Bertillon in 1894
- Born: June 23, 1865; Turin, Italy
- Citizenship: Italy
- Occupations: seamstress cook burglar anarchist
- Years active: 1880s-1890s
- Known for: Illegalist activism
- Height: 156 cm (5 ft 1 in)
- Movement: Anarchism
- Opponent: Bourgeoisie
- Partner: Orsini Bertani (1890s - ?)

Maria Zanini, also known as Maria Milanaccio, born on 23 June 1865, in Turin and dead after 1894, was an Italian seamstress, cook, and anarchist militant. She is best known for her actions during the rise of illegalism, where she associated with other illegalists, forming the Ortiz Gang with them.

After moving to France and settling in Paris, she became involved in the capital's illegalist circles and likely served as a fence for her gang, the Ortiz Gang, named after Léon Ortiz. Arrested, Zanini was put on trial during the Trial of the Thirty, a political trial targeting leading figures of anarchism in France. Zanini was ultimately acquitted but expelled from France in 1894.

== Biography ==
=== Youth and illegalism ===
Maria Zanini was born on 23 June 1865, in Turin. She was the daughter of Antonio Zanini and Paolina Bourgnio. She started working as a cook and seamstress to earn a living and married a man named Milanaccio; however, he died, and she became a widow.

In 1892-1893, while in Paris, Maria Zanini was part of the Ortiz Gang, an illegalist gang. Besides Zanini, the gang included, among others, the couple Paul Chiericotti and Annette Soubrié, Léon Ortiz, Victorine Belloti and her son Louis, François Liégeois, and Orsini Bertani, Zanini's companion. Zanini was likely responsible for fencing stolen goods for the gang.

By October 1893, Zanini moved to 1st Boulevard Brune, which served as the hideout for the gang's stolen loot and where several members resided. She lived with her companion in this hideout, in a two-window apartment, during early 1894. Following Antoinette Cazal's arrest, authorities traced back to Cazal's companion, Ortiz, who was living with the other group members.

On 18 March 1894, Zanini was arrested along with the other members of the group and placed in jail.

=== Trial of the Thirty and expulsion ===
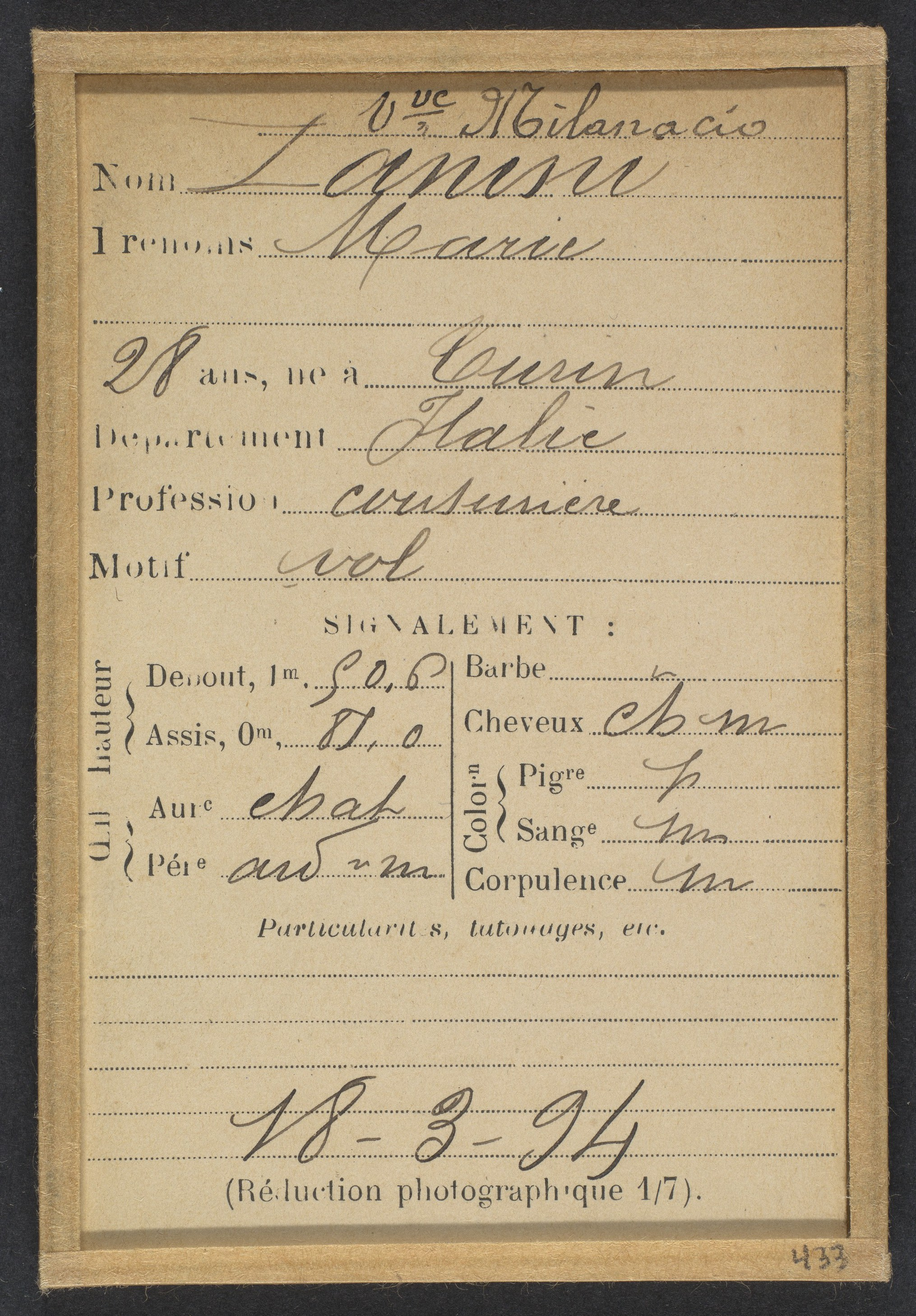
Zanini's description file (1894)

In August 1894, Maria Zanini was put on trial during the Trial of the Thirty. This political trial targeted thirty prominent figures of anarchism in France, intended for conviction following the assassination of Sadi Carnot by Sante Caserio. Unexpectedly, the jurors acquitted all the accused except for Ortiz, who received the harshest sentence—15 years of deportation to a penal colony—and a few other members of the gang. The conservative newspaper Gil Blas described her interventions at the trial as follows:

Knows nothing, and doesn't even see the faces of the people who stay at her place.

According to Jean Grave, who was himself acquitted at the trial, the gang members reportedly quarreled amongst themselves, attempting to shift blame for the burglaries onto former friends, some of whom even testified against them. The severity of French justice was made possible because their actions weren't considered anarchist by the French authorities. In the lois scélérates ('villainous laws'), a series of laws targeting the anarchist movement, a distinction was made between "ideologues" and "propagandists", with the latter being punished far more severely.

Like Grave, Zanini was acquitted after her trial. She was nonetheless subjected to an expulsion order and forced to leave France. She then joined Bertani in the United Kingdom.

== Legacy ==
=== Art and politics ===
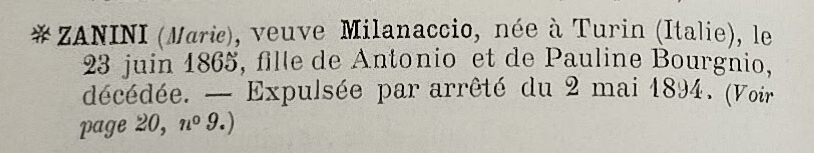
Zanini's expulsion order (4 M 380 - courtesy of Archives anarchistes)

In 2024, Zanini's police photograph, taken by Alphonse Bertillon during her arrest and his 'filing' of anarchists, which was held at the Metropolitan Museum of Art (MET), was chosen by American artist Jesse Krimes to be featured in his exhibition Corrections. This exhibition was critical of Donald Trump and the U.S. carceral system.

== Bibliography ==
- Bach Jensen, Richard (2015). The Battle against Anarchist Terrorism: An International History, 1878–1934. Cambridge: Cambridge University Press (CUP). ISBN 978-1-107-03405-1.
- Campanella, Lucía (2022). Two Anarchist Cultural Agents Forging the Twentieth-Century Uruguayan Cultural Field: Publishing as Soft Power. De Gruyter. ISBN 9783110744040.
