= Casteljaloux =

- Commune
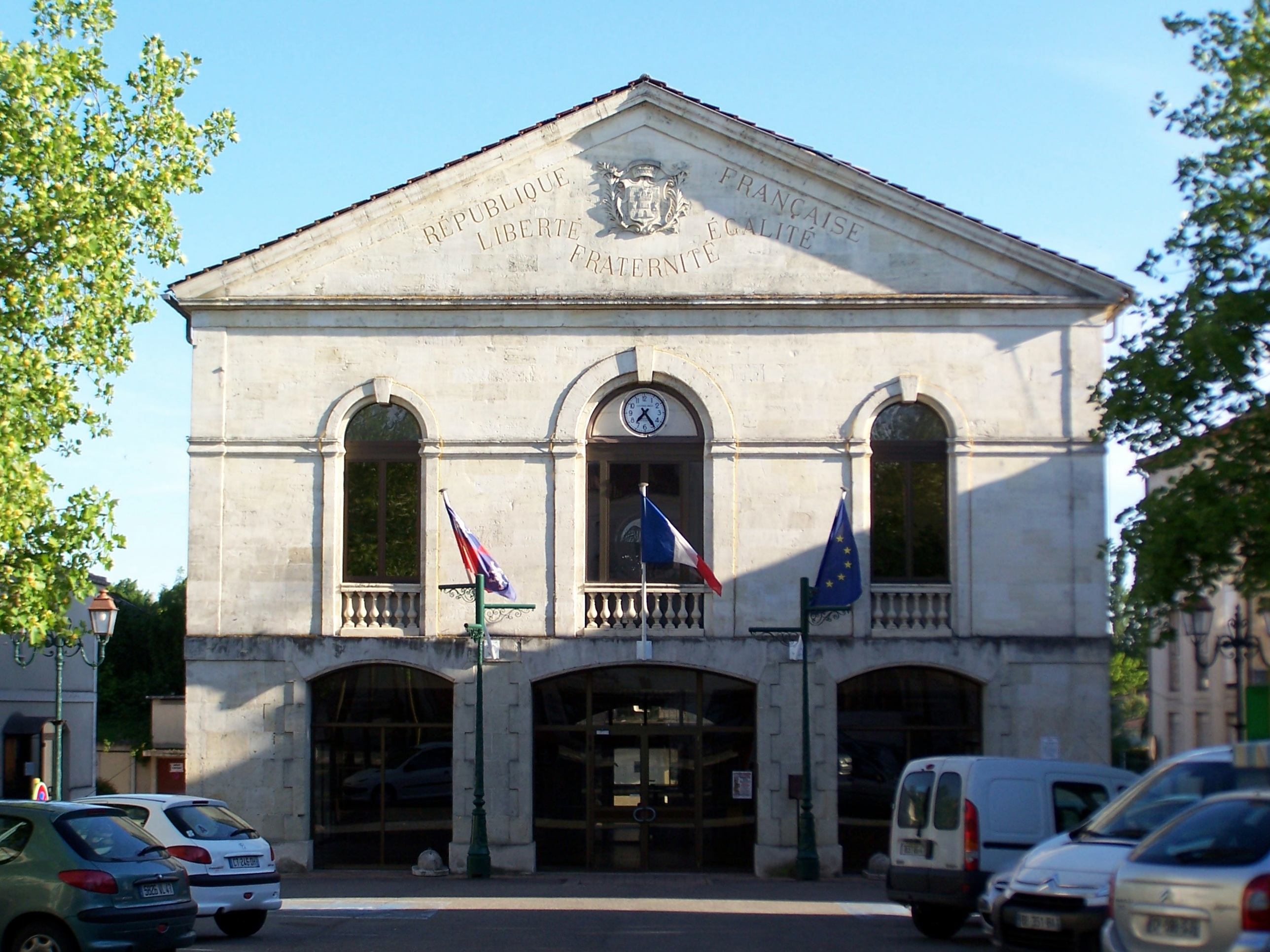
- The town hall in Casteljaloux

- Coat of arms
- Location of Casteljaloux
- Location within France Location within Nouvelle-Aquitaine
- Coordinates: 44°18′55″N 0°05′20″E
- Country: France
- Region: Nouvelle-Aquitaine
- Department: Lot-et-Garonne
- Arrondissement: Nérac
- Canton: Les Forêts de Gascogne

Government
  - Mayor (2020–2026): Julie Castillo
- Area^{1}: 30.59 km^{2} (11.81 sq mi)
- Elevation: 69 m (226 ft)
- Highest elevation: 168 m (551 ft)
- Lowest elevation: 55 m (180 ft)
- Population (2023): 4,755
  - Density: 155.4/km^{2} (402.6/sq mi)
- Demonym: Casteljalousains
- Time zone: UTC+01:00 (CET)
  - Summer (DST): UTC+02:00 (CEST)
- INSEE/Postal code: 47052 /47700
- Website: www.mairie-casteljaloux.fr
- ^{1} French Land Register data, which excludes lakes, ponds, glaciers > 1 km^{2} (0.386 sq mi or 247 acres) and river estuaries.

Casteljaloux (French pronunciation: [kastɛlʒalu]; Occitan: Castèlgelós) is a commune in the Lot-et-Garonne department in south-western France.

== Population ==
Historical population
Year	Pop.	±% p.a.
1968	5,406	—
1975	5,343	−0.17%
1982	5,229	−0.31%
1990	5,048	−0.44%
1999	4,755	−0.66%
2007	4,598	−0.42%
2012	4,662	+0.28%
2017	4,579	−0.36%
2023	4,755	+0.63%
Source: INSEE

== Sister city ==
Casteljaloux sister cities

- Kunheim, France (Since 1939/40)

== Notable people ==
- Agrippa d'Aubigné (1552–1630), poet, soldier, propagandist and chronicler
- Théophile de Viau (1590–1626), author of Sonnet sur son exil dans les landes de Castel-Jaloux.
- José de Canterac, (1786–1835), Spanish general
- Armand Matha (1861–1930), anarchist
- Catherine Bouroche (1942–2015), sculptor

== See also ==
- Communes of the Lot-et-Garonne department
