= Fiquefleur-Équainville =

- Commune
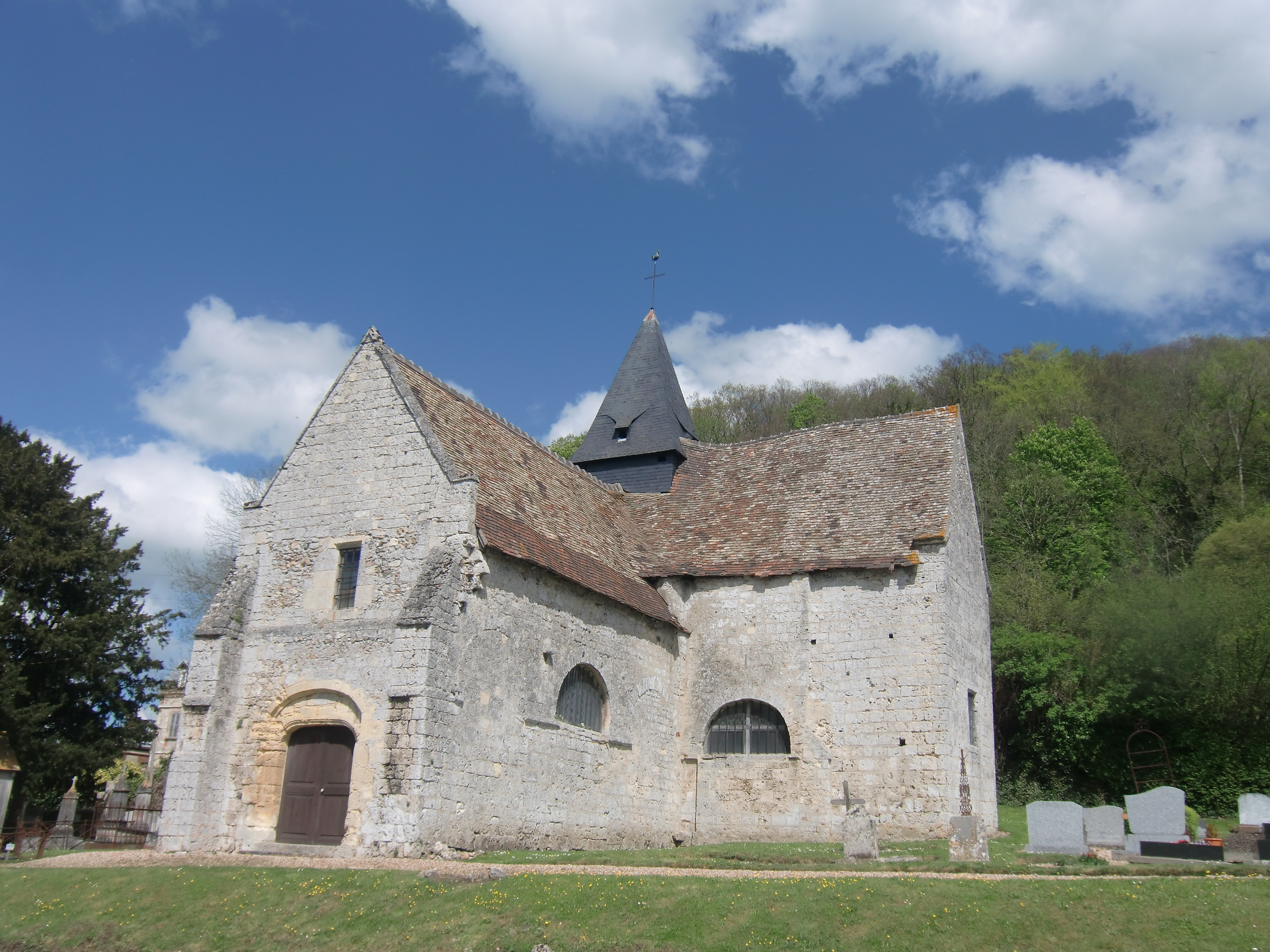
- The church in Fiquefleur-Équainville
- Location of Fiquefleur-Équainville
- Location within France Location within Normandy
- Coordinates: 49°23′30″N 0°18′42″E
- Country: France
- Region: Normandy
- Department: Eure
- Arrondissement: Bernay
- Canton: Beuzeville

Government
  - Mayor (2020–2026): Michel Prentout
- Area^{1}: 9.8 km^{2} (3.8 sq mi)
- Elevation: 97 m (318 ft)
- Highest elevation: 113 m (371 ft)
- Lowest elevation: 0 m (0 ft)
- Population (2023): 736
  - Density: 75/km^{2} (190/sq mi)
- Time zone: UTC+01:00 (CET)
  - Summer (DST): UTC+02:00 (CEST)
- INSEE/Postal code: 27243 /27210
- ^{1} French Land Register data, which excludes lakes, ponds, glaciers > 1 km^{2} (0.386 sq mi or 247 acres) and river estuaries.

Fiquefleur-Équainville (French pronunciation: [fikflœʁ ekɛ̃vil]) is a commune in the Eure department in the Normandy region in northern France.

== History ==
On 7 January 1893, the Ortiz gang committed a burglary there.

== Population ==
Historical population
Year	Pop.	±% p.a.
1968	462	—
1975	430	−1.02%
1982	477	+1.49%
1990	496	+0.49%
1999	563	+1.42%
2007	632	+1.46%
2012	676	+1.36%
2017	725	+1.41%
2023	736	+0.25%
Source: INSEE

== See also ==
- Communes of the Eure department
