= Orsini Bertani =

Italian-Uruguayan publisher and anarchist

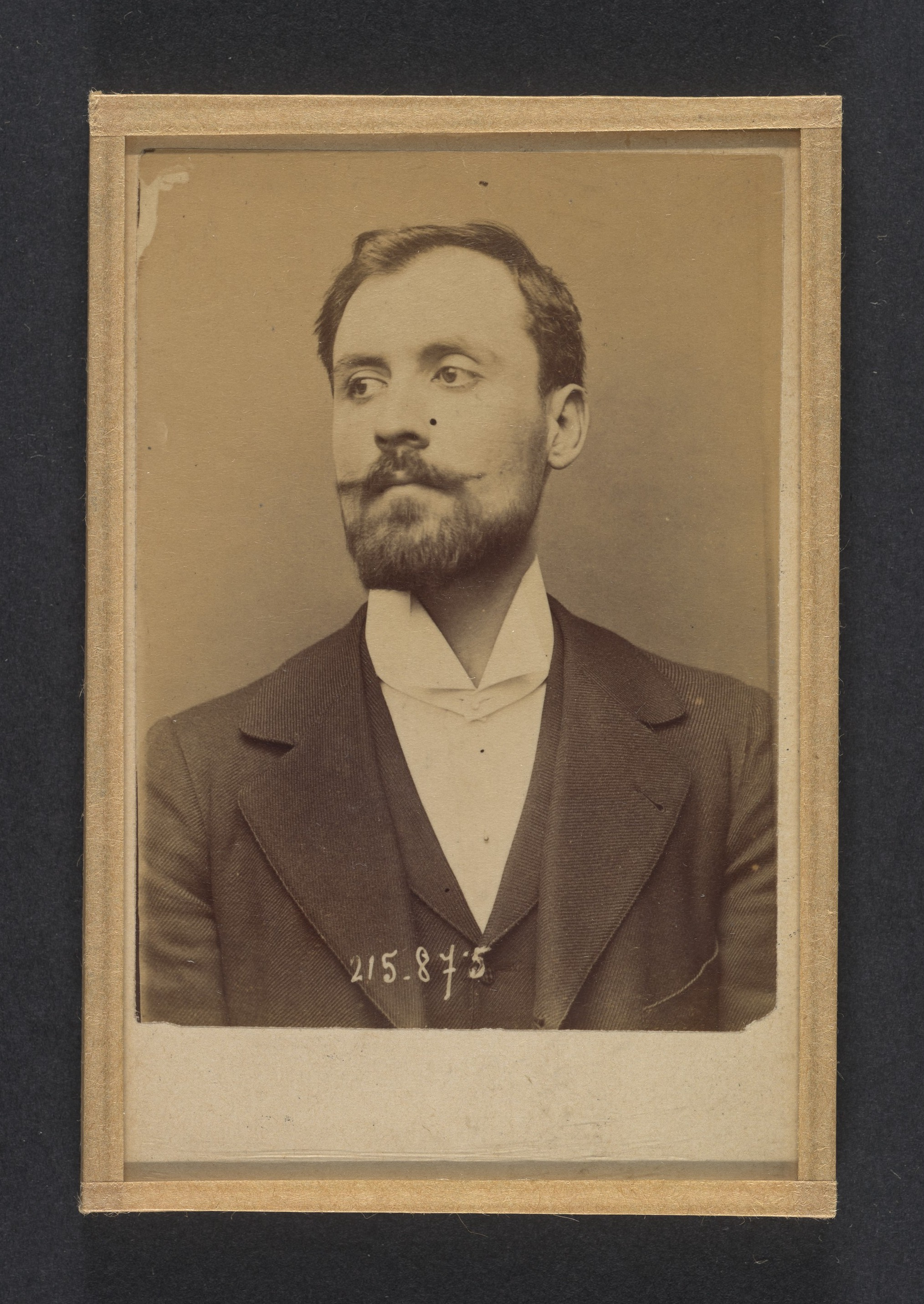
- Orsini Bertani's mugshot by Alphonse Bertillon (1894)
- Born: 29 July 1869; Florence, Italy
- Died: 1939 (aged 69–70); Montevideo, Uruguay
- Resting place: Central Cemetery of Montevideo
- Movement: Anarchism
- Partners: Maria Zanini (1890s); Anita Lagourdette (1900s)
- Relatives: Hugo del Carril (grandson)

Orsini Bertani (29 July 1869 – 1939) was an Italian-Uruguayan publisher and anarchist activist.

== Biography ==
Orsini Bertani was born in Florence on 28 July 1869. He emigrated to Argentina, where he joined the local anarchist movement, before moving to France in 1892. In Marseille, he was surveilled by police, who suspected him of forging counterfeit money. He later moved into the safe house of the Ortiz Gang, in the 14th arrondissement of Paris, where he lived with his partner Maria Zanini. He was arrested during a raid on 18 March 1894, implicating him in the gang's activities. In the Trial of the Thirty, which took place in August 1894, he was sentenced to 6 months' imprisonment.

After his release from prison, he moved back to Argentina. He was expelled from the country in 1902, after participating in strike actions, and moved to Uruguay. In the capital of Montevideo, he established a publishing house, a bookshop and the anarchist magazine Futuro. Through his publishing activities, particularly after the publication of Rafael Barrett's collected works, he became highly influential in the Uruguayan anarchist movement. He also published the works of writers such as Delmira Agustini, Ángel Falco, Ernesto Herrera, Julio Herrera y Reissig, Manuel de Castro and Javier de Viana. Following the election of José Batlle y Ordóñez as President of Uruguay in 1911, he moved away from orthodox anarchism towards anarcho-batllismo, and served as a labour inspector for the government. After the rise of Italian fascism in 1922, he began organising the nascent Uruguayan anti-fascist movement.

Bertani died in 1939 and was given a public funeral in Montevideo. Bertani's grandson was the Argentine filmmaker and singer Hugo del Carril.
