= The Battle Against Anarchist Terrorism =

2014 history book

- First edition
- Author: Richard Bach Jensen
- Subject: History of anarchism
- Publisher: Cambridge University Press
- Publication date: 2014
- Pages: 410
- ISBN: 9781107034051

The Battle Against Anarchist Terrorism: An International History, 1878–1934, is a book on the governmental campaign against anarchist terrorism written by Richard Bach Jensen and published in 2014 by Cambridge University Press.
