= Trial of the Thirty =

1894 trial of anarchists in Paris

The Trial of the Thirty (French: Procès des trente) was a trial in 1894 in Paris, France, aimed at legitimizing the lois scélérates passed in 1893–94 against the anarchist movement and restricting press freedom by proving the existence of an effective association between anarchists.

Lasting from 6 August to 31 October 1894, it put on trial 30 French and foreign alleged anarchists, on a charge of "criminal association" (association de malfaiteurs). Held in virtue of the lois scélérates censoring the press and outlawing apologies for propaganda by the deed, the trial mixed anarchist theorists with common law criminals.

Among the defendants were Charles Chatel, Ivan Aguéli, Sébastien Faure, Félix Fénéon, Jean Grave, Louis Armand Matha, Maximilien Luce, Émile Pouget, Paul Reclus, Alexander Cohen, Constant Martin and Louis Duprat.

== Context ==
During the first months of 1894, the police organized searches, raids and detentions against the anarchist movement. The government aimed at annihilating the anarchist movement, and used for this the lois scélérates of December 1893 and July 1894, enacted after Auguste Vaillant's bombing. On 21 February 1894, Le Père Peinard, published by Émile Pouget, ceased being edited, and was followed on 10 March 1894 by Jean Grave's Le Révolté. From 1 January to 30 June 1894, 426 people, among which 29 could not be detained, were judged on charges of having constituted a "criminal association". According to the historian Jean Maitron, most activists had been either arrested or had fled the country, and all propaganda had practically ceased.

== Trial ==
On 6 August 1894, thirty defendants were judged by the Cour d'assises of the Seine. Among the most famous were included Jean Grave, Sébastien Faure, Charles Chatel, editor at La Revue anarchiste, Félix Fénéon and Louis Armand Matha. Five of the accused had gone underground: Paul Reclus, Constant Martin, Émile Pouget, Louis Duprat, Alexandre Cohen. Alongside these anarchist theorists, common-law inculpees were included in the trials; this amalgam was favored by the illegalism supported by some anarchists, who claimed a right to live in margins of the law. Those included Ortiz, Chericotti, and others. In total, 19 theoreticians and propagandists and 11 thieves claiming themselves to be anarchists.

The chief prosecutor, Bulot, prohibited the press from reproducing the interrogatories of Jean Grave and Sébastien Faure, leading Henri Rochefort to write in L'Intransigeant that the criminal association concerned not the defendants but the magistrates and the ministers. The defendants easily discharged themselves of the inculpation of "criminal association" since at the time, the French anarchist movement rejected the sole idea of association and acted exclusively as individuals. However, the president of the court, Dayras, dismissed all objections from the defense, which led Sébastien Faure to say:

"Each time we prove the error of one of your allegations, you declare it unimportant. You may very well sum up all zeros, but you can't obtain a unity."

In the same sense, Fénéon was accused of having been the intimate friend of the German anarchist Kampfmeyer. Le Figaro's correspondent thus transcribed his interrogation:

He cross-examines F.F. himself: "Are you an anarchist, M. Fénéon?"

"I am a Burgundian born in Turin."
"Your police file extends to one hundred and seventy pages. It is documented that you were intimate with the German terrorist Kampfmeyer."
"The intimacy cannot have been great as I do not speak German and he does not speak French." (Laughter in courtroom.)
"It has been established that you surrounded yourself with Cohen and Ortoz."
"One can hardly be surrounded by two persons; you need at least three." (More laughter.)
"You were seen conferring with them behind a lamppost!"

"A lamppost is round. Can Your Honour tell me where behind a lamppost is?" (Loud, prolonged laughter. Judge calls for order.).

Fénéon received support from the poet Stéphane Mallarmé, who qualified him as a "fine spirit" and one of the "more subtile critique" (un esprit très fin et un des critiques les plus subtils et les plus aigus que nous avons). Debates continued during one week. The general prosecutor Bulot intended to prove that there had been an effective agreement between theoreticians and illegalists, but failed to do so for lack of evidence. He abandoned the accusations for some of them, and claimed attenuating circumstances for others, but requested harsh sentences for those he depicted as the leaders: Grave, Faure, Matha and some others. Finally, the jury acquitted all, except the common law prisoners, Ortiz, Chericotti, Bertani, respectively condemned to 15 and 8 years of forced labour and to six months in prison.

== See also ==
- Anarchism in France
- Lois scélérates (national security legislation)
- Trial of Antonio Negri in Italy concerning his writings and alleged influence on bombings committed during the Years of Lead
