= Jestřabí =

Jestřabí may refer to places in the Czech Republic:

- Jestřabí (Zlín District), a municipality and village in the Zlín Region
- Jestřabí, a village and part of Velká Bíteš in the Vysočina Region
- Jestřabí Lhota, a municipality and village in the Central Bohemian Region
- Jestřabí v Krkonoších, a municipality and village in the Liberec Region
- Kuřimské Jestřabí, a municipality and village in the South Moravian Region
- Pernštejnské Jestřabí, a municipality and village in the South Moravian Region

== See also ==
- Jestřebí (disambiguation)
