= Antoinette Cazal =

French brasserie server, anarchist and illegalist

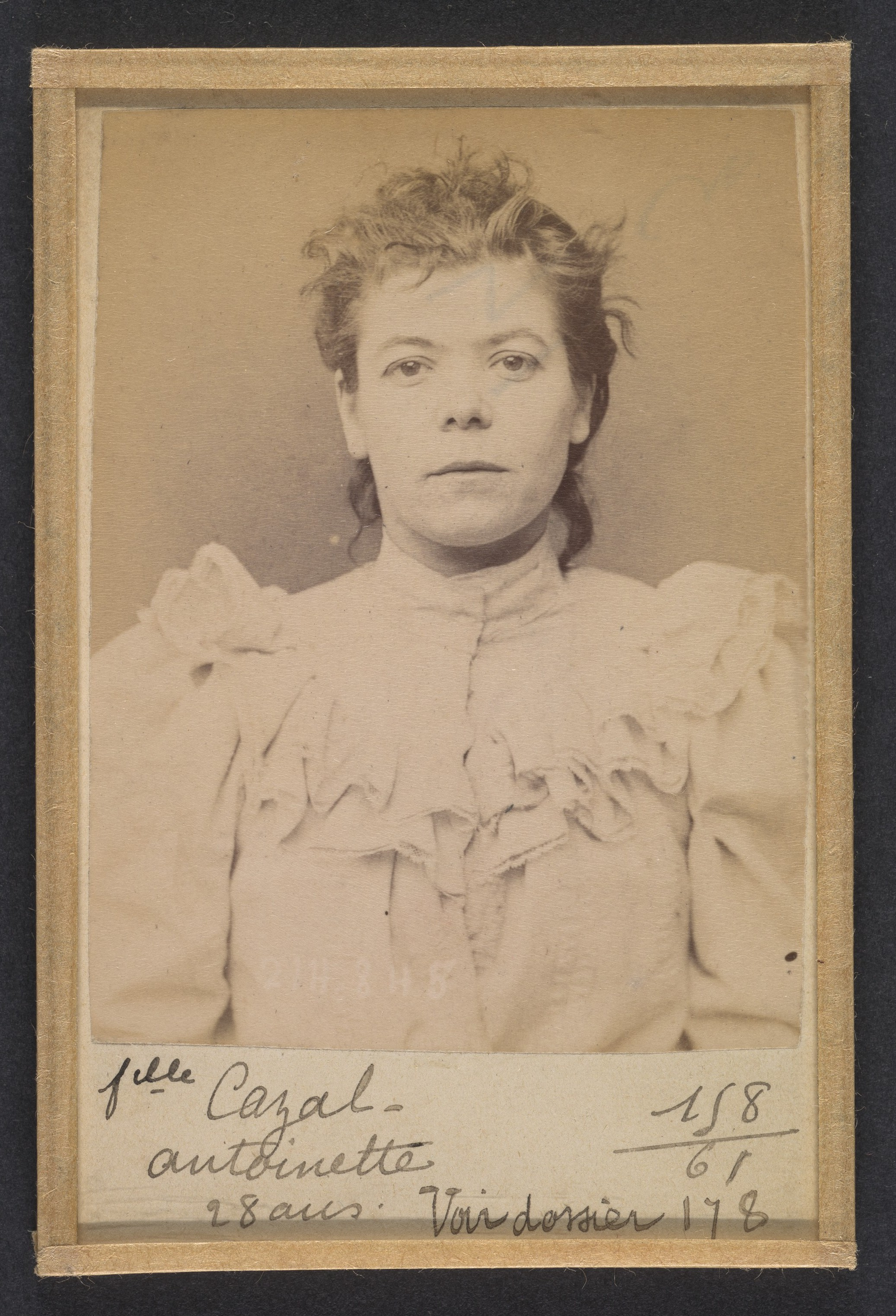
- Antoinette Cazal's mugshot by Alphonse Bertillon (1894)
- Born: 10 March 1862; Le Falgoux
- Died: 12 April 1902 (aged 40); Paris
- Occupations: server, anarchist, illegalist
- Known for: Being targeted during the Trial of the Thirty and in link with the Ortiz gang
- Height: 152 m (498 ft 8 in)
- Movement: Anarchism

Antoinette Cazal (1862–1902), nicknamed "Trognette", was a French brasserie server, anarchist, and illegalist. She is known, among other things, for being targeted during the Trial of the Thirty with her group, the Ortiz gang.

Born into a poor family and affected by tuberculosis, she became a brasserie server where she met the illegalist anarchist activist Léon Ortiz. Cazal entered into a relationship with him, and the two collaborated on burglaries, the fencing of certain goods, and other actions. They also had a conflicted and complicated relationship. Following her arrest, Cazal was accused of receiving stolen goods during the Trial of the Thirty along with other members of the gang.

She was acquitted and married Ortiz, with whom she wished to maintain a connection, and whom she wanted to visit and follow into deportation, as he himself was sentenced to fifteen years in a penal colony. Lacking resources, she was unable to do so and remained in France. She died in 1902, likely from tuberculosis.

In addition to being an interesting historical figure due to the historiographical questions posed by her biography, Cazal is possibly the model for Édouard Manet's painting Woman Reading (1879).

== Biography ==
=== Youth ===
Antoinette Blanche Cazal was born on 10 March 1862 in Le Falgoux. According to her birth certificate, she was the daughter of Catherine Bergeron, who was unemployed, and Antoine Cazard, who worked as a domestic servant.

=== Ortiz gang and illegalism ===
Cazal met Léon Ortiz, an illegalist anarchist active in Parisian circles, at her job while she was working as a brasserie server at the Brasserie Pompadour on Rue Turbigo. The two became a couple, and as she was affected by tuberculosis, Ortiz took care of her, and they jointly nicknamed each other "Trognon" and "Trognette". (feminine and masculine of the same word)

In 1892, when Placide Schouppe, an illegalist close to Ortiz, escaped from prison and returned to Paris, he reunited with his partner, Élise Pelgrom – who herself was coming out of a relationship with the sculptor Strauch. When she wanted to retrieve her furniture by going back to live with Schouppe, Strauch refused, which prompted them, likely aided by Cazal and Ortiz, to go and retrieve the furniture themselves by burglarizing him. They took additional furniture with them. The sculptor then filed a complaint, which put the group at risk; their home was searched, but the police did not find any compromising evidence. Cazal left Paris for Auvergne during this period, while Ortiz went to London.

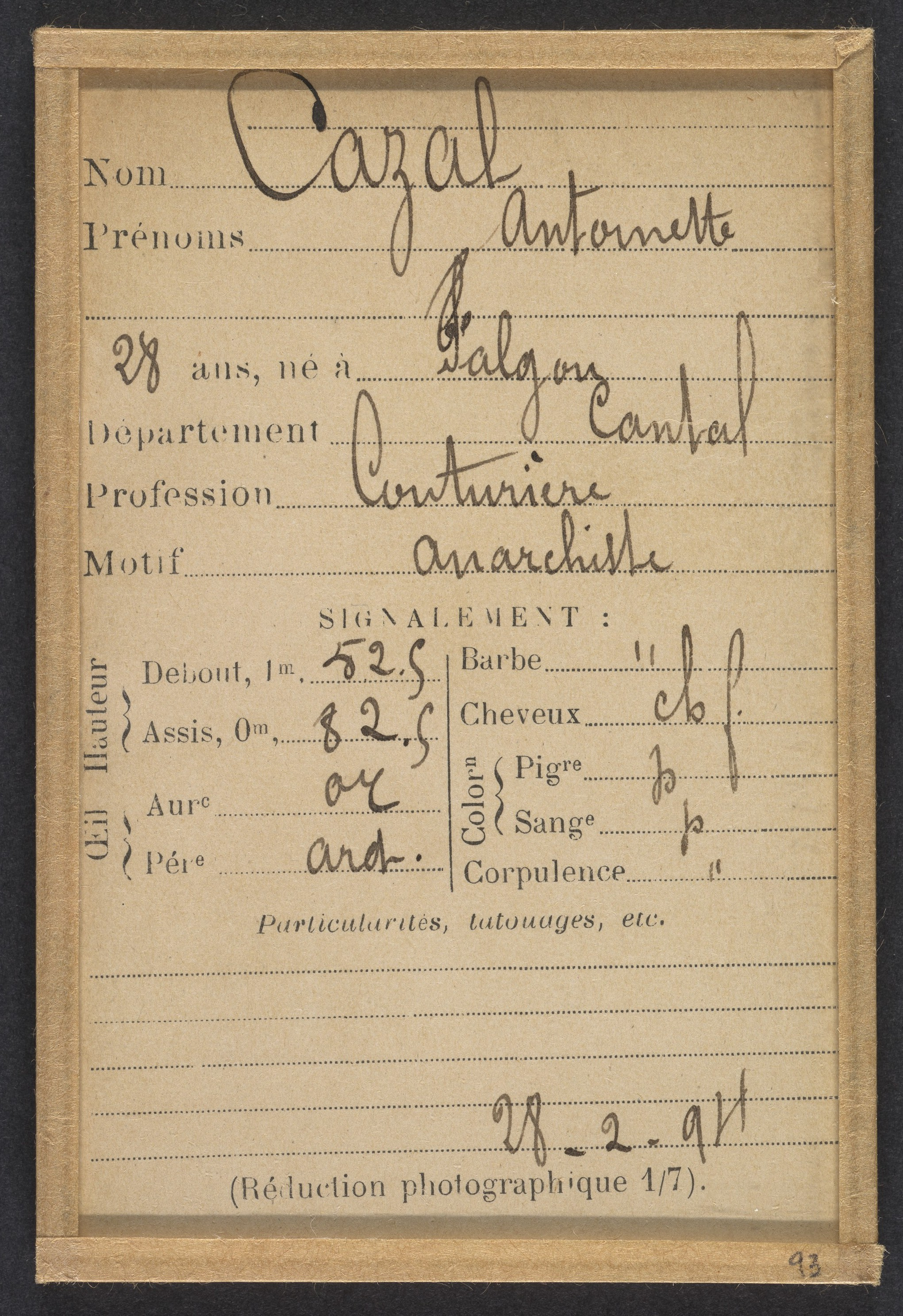
Bertillon file on Antoinette Cazal (1894)

After a dispute with Ortiz, who had found another partner named Augustine Curry, the anarchist went to the police and gave them information concerning the Carmaux-Bons Enfants bombing, accusing Ortiz of having participated in its preparation. She also denounced Bonnard and Adrienne Chailliey, stating that she was the source of the mantilla that Chailliey allegedly wore during the attack, which she had entrusted to her. This denunciation led to their arrest, but Émile Henry's confessions regarding the bombing undermined Cazal's version for the French authorities.

Meanwhile, after a series of burglaries, Ortiz disappeared and moved within clandestine circles in Paris, London, Brussels, Perpignan, and Barcelona, where he spent part of 1893. When Schouppe was arrested, the police also sought to arrest Ortiz, but he managed to escape capture and hide at Cazal's place.

She was arrested on 28 February 1894 for lying to the authorities, and the arrest of other members of Ortiz's gang followed shortly after. Among the other arrested members were Paolo Chiericotti and Annette Soubrier (a couple), Victorina Trucano and her son Luigi, Maria Zanini and her companion Orsini Bertani, and François Liégeois. Confronted with Ortiz, the two insulted each other.

=== Trial of the Thirty and later years ===
Antoinette Cazal then initiated plans to marry Ortiz, which would allow her to visit him – though these plans should not be seen as genuine support for the institution of marriage. Cazal, Ortiz, and other members of the group were put on trial during the Trial of the Thirty, a political trial targeting both prominent figures of anarchism in France and the illegalist anarchists from Ortiz's gang. She was accused of receiving and reselling stolen goods but was ultimately acquitted. Ortiz was sentenced to fifteen years of penal servitude.

Immediately after her acquittal, she sought to visit Ortiz as frequently as possible, undertook numerous administrative procedures, and married him on 15 December 1894 at the Town Hall of the 11th arrondissement of Paris and at Sainte-Marguerite church, under heavy police escort. She wished to join him at the penal colony in French Guiana, but her poverty prevented her from even following him to Île de Ré before his deportation. She thus moved in with Eva Schiroky, Léon Ortiz's mother, instead.

Antoinette Cazal died alone on 12 April 1902 at the age of 40 at 28 avenue Parmentier. She most likely died of tuberculosis; moreover, Ortiz no longer seemed to be living with her despite his liberation from the penal colony in 1898.

== Legacy ==
=== Research ===
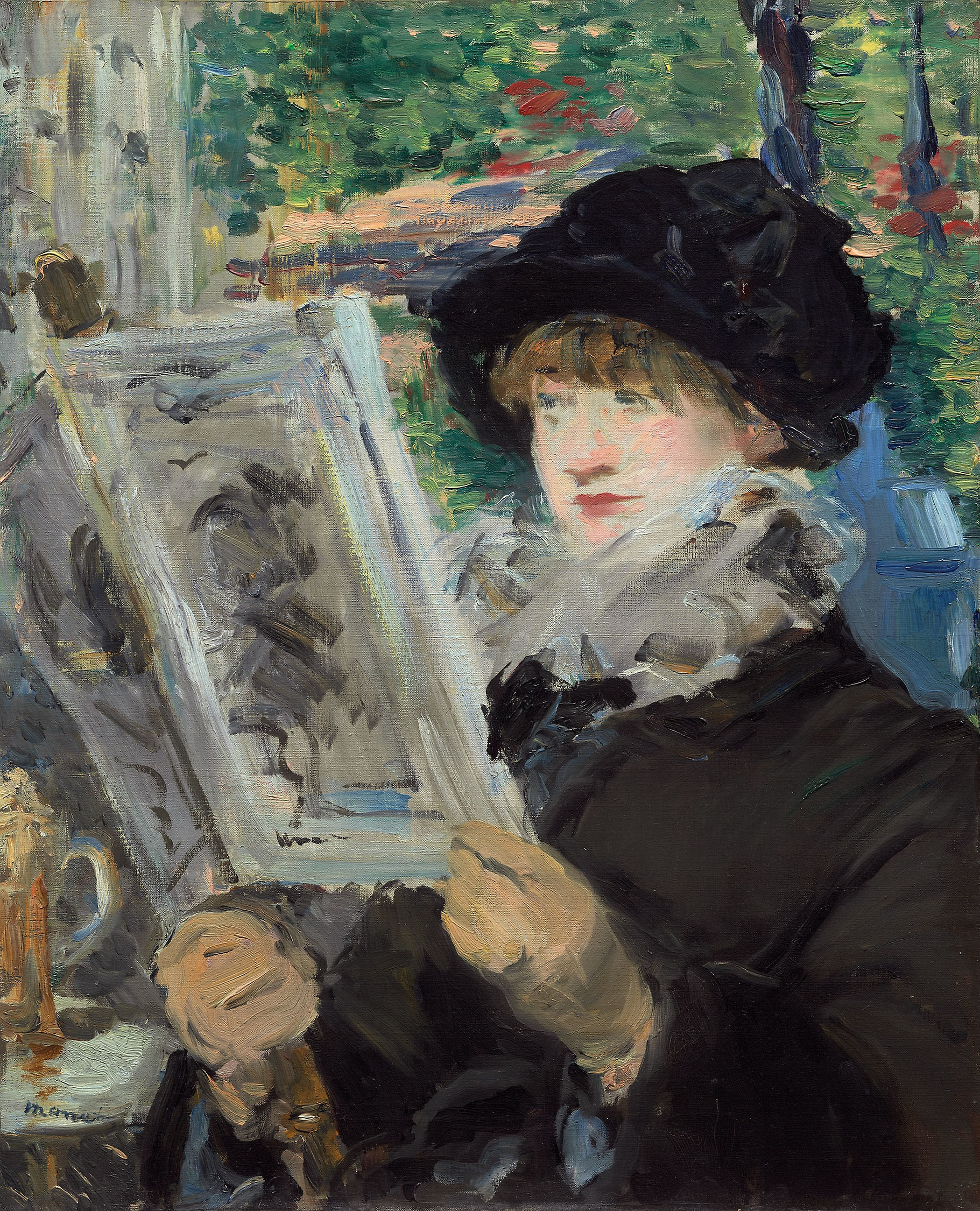
Édouard Manet's Woman Reading (1879), whose model was named Trognette.

According to historian Constance Bantman, her profile is "fascinating" because it raises numerous questions, particularly regarding her relationship with the anarchist movement. Bantman argues that crucial information about her is still missing, such as whether she was politicized through anarchist literature, if she knew and read the anarchist press, or even if she identified herself as an anarchist.

=== Woman Reading (1879) ===
According to Adolphe Tabarant, Édouard Manet (1832–1883) purportedly had a model named Trognette for Woman Reading (1879). Tabarant wrote precisely:

We then come to Manet, represented by about fifteen delightful small still lifes, one of his portraits of Berthe Morisot, and one of those he did of Isabelle Lemonnier, The Reader with a Hat [Trognette], The Beach, and also the famous watercolor of Olympia. [...] The woman who posed for this Woman Reading bore the nickname 'Trognette', [and not 'Tronquette', as it is sometimes written], by which the painting is also known.

This does not necessarily refer to Cazal, but such a nickname was rare at the time, and she could have been the model for Manet mentioned by Tabarant.

=== Police mugshot ===
Her police photograph is part of the collections of the Metropolitan Museum of Art (MET).

== Bibliography ==
- Petit, Dominique (2024), "CAZAL Antoinette, Blanche [dite Trognette]", Dictionnaire des anarchistes (Le Maitron), Paris: Le Maitron des anarchistes
