= Jestřebí =

Jestřebí may refer to places in the Czech Republic:

- Jestřebí (Česká Lípa District), a municipality and village in the Liberec Region
- Jestřebí (Náchod District), a municipality and village in the Hradec Králové Region
- Jestřebí (Šumperk District), a municipality and village in the Olomouc Region
- Jestřebí, a village and part of Brtnice in the Vysočina Region
- Jestřebí, a town part of Rájec-Jestřebí in the South Moravian Region
- Jestřebí hory, a mountain range

== See also ==
- Jestřabí (disambiguation)
