= Eva Schiroky =

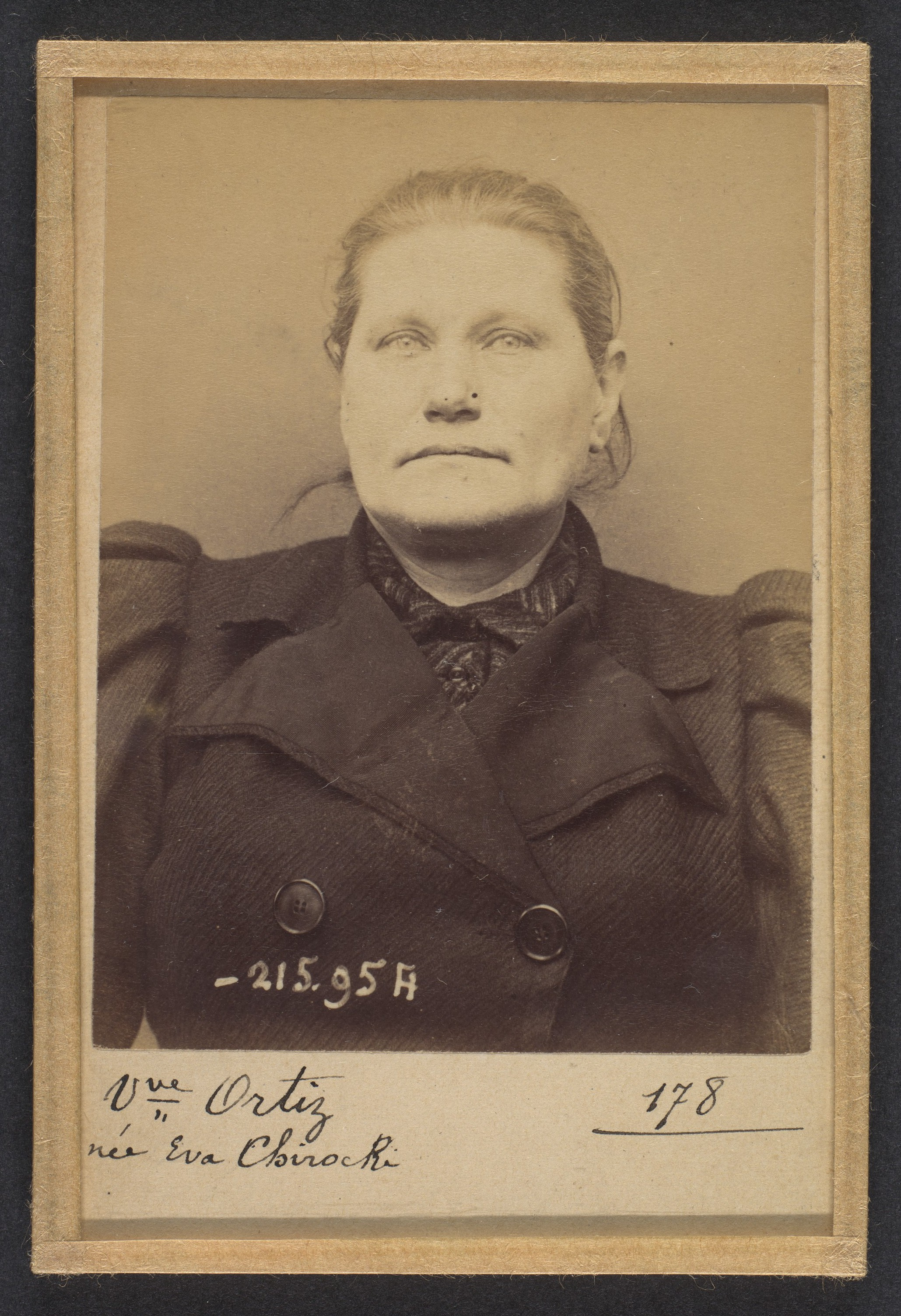
- Schiroky's mugshot taken by Alphonse Bertillon (Anthropometric File of Anarchists - 1894)
- Born: 23 September 1840; Velká Bíteš, Moravia, Austrian Empire
- Died: 7 May 1919 (aged 78); Wilmington, United States
- Citizenship: Austrian (birth), French (marriage)
- Occupation: Cook
- Known for: Suspected member of the Ortiz gang
- Movement: Anarchism
- Spouse: Philippe Ortiz (m. 1880)
- Children: Léon Ortiz, Philippe Ortiz

Eva Schiroky, nicknamed Eva Chirowska (23 September 1840 – 7 May 1919), was a Czech anarchist and cook. She is best known for having been suspected of being a member of the Ortiz gang, an illegalist group named after her eldest son, Léon Ortiz.

Born in Velká Bíteš, Austrian Empire, she moved to France, where she gave birth to Léon and married Philippe Ortiz, a Mexican valet who adopted her first son. While working as a cook, Schiroky remained close to her son as he turned toward illegalism, notably sending him 1,500 francs, which led authorities to suspect her involvement in his gang's activities. Implicated alongside one of her close friends, Caroline Hermann, her home was raided and she was arrested during the repression of early 1894. She was eventually released and the charges were dropped, allowing her to escape the Trial of the Thirty. Following her son's deportation, Schiroky took in her daughter-in-law, Antoinette Cazal. She died in 1919 in Wilmington, Delaware, where her son was in exile.

Her mugshot is currently part of the collections at the Metropolitan Museum of Art (MET).

== Biography ==
Eva Schiroky was born on 23 September 1840 in Velká Bíteš, in the Austrian Empire. She later moved to and settled in France.

On 18 November 1868, she gave birth to Léon Ortiz in Paris. She married Philippe Ortiz, a Mexican valet, on 25 November 1880; he adopted Léon six years later. In the meantime, in 1881, she had a second son, Philippe, with her husband. During this period, Schiroky worked as a cook.

In the late 1880s and early 1890s, as her son turned toward illegalism, she remained in contact with him and replied to his letters. He would ask her for money, claiming he was working but not earning enough to support himself; Schiroky eventually sent him a total of 1,500 francs.

In November 1893, while Ortiz was back in Paris following the Carmaux-Bons-Enfants bombing (for which he was a prime suspect), he met a woman he wanted to bring to his mother's home. This led to a conflict between them, and Ortiz eventually broke off the relationship with his new acquaintance.

During this time, while her son was a fugitive from the French authorities, the two would meet at the home of Caroline Hermann (known as Clarry). Hermann was a close friend of Schiroky, the two had known each other since their time in Austria and were very close, and these meetings managed to evade police detection for a time.

In January 1894, Ortiz informed her that he would have to be away for a few weeks. The following month, which also saw the Café Terminus bombing and the repression of early 1894, her home was raided; the police found a letter from her son as well as copies of Le Père Peinard and La Révolte.

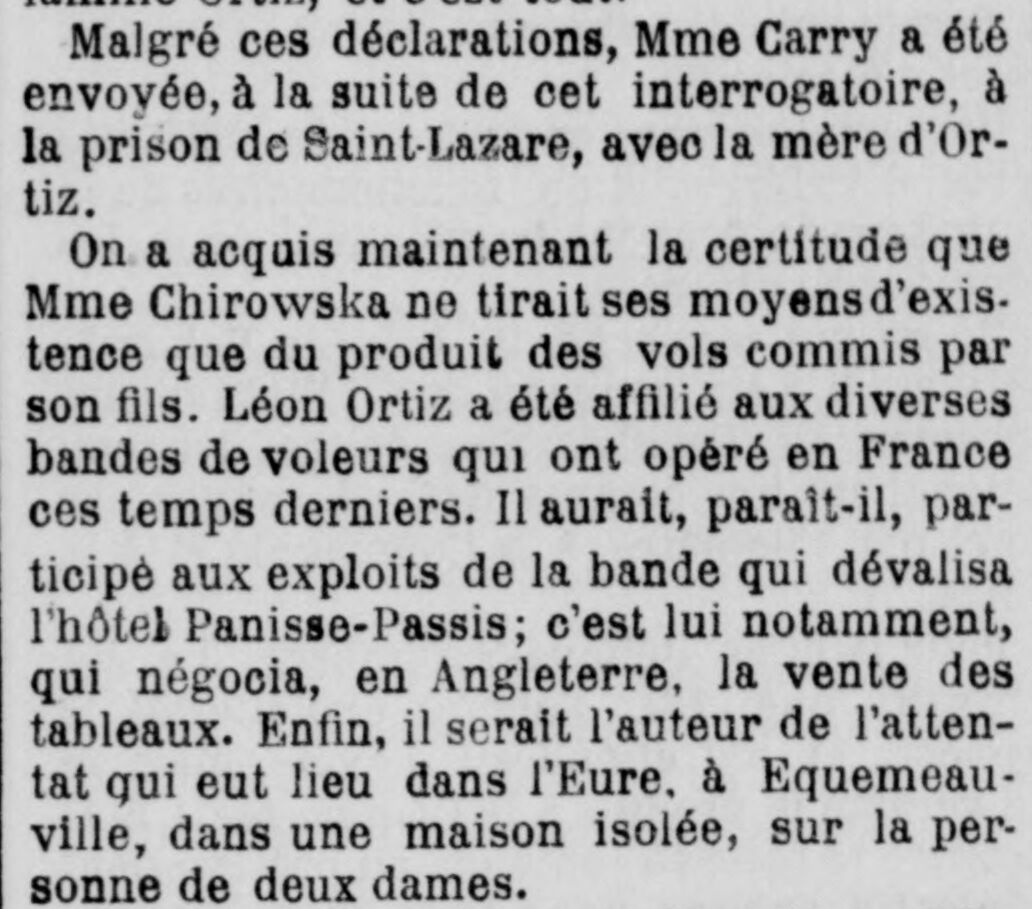
Le Moniteur Universel discussing Schiroky (27 March 1894)

On 18 March, when her son was arrested, she exclaimed, 'It was his excessive kindness that ruined him!'. Schiroky was arrested three days later for criminal association, as her money transfers appeared particularly suspicious to the judge investigating the Carmaux-Bons-Enfants bombing. The fact that she did not hold a lucrative profession that would grant her access to such funds partly explained these suspicions, and she was subsequently incarcerated at the Saint-Lazare prison alongside Clarry. Clarry's mother took in Schiroky's son, Philippe, during her arrest, as he had been left abandoned.

In April, Judge Meyer, who was in charge of Clarry's case, ordered her release. A dismissal of the charges was later granted, meaning she was not implicated or targeted alongside her son during the Trial of the Thirty in August 1894. She attended his marriage to Antoinette Cazal before Ortiz was sent into penal deportation to French Guiana.

Cazal lived with her for a time following her new husband's exile.

Schiroky died on 7 May 1919 in Wilmington, United States, where her son Léon had settled after his release from the penal colony.

== Legacy ==
Her mugshot is currently part of the collections at the Metropolitan Museum of Art (MET).
