= Élise Pelgrom =

Belgian passementerie worker and illegalist anarchist

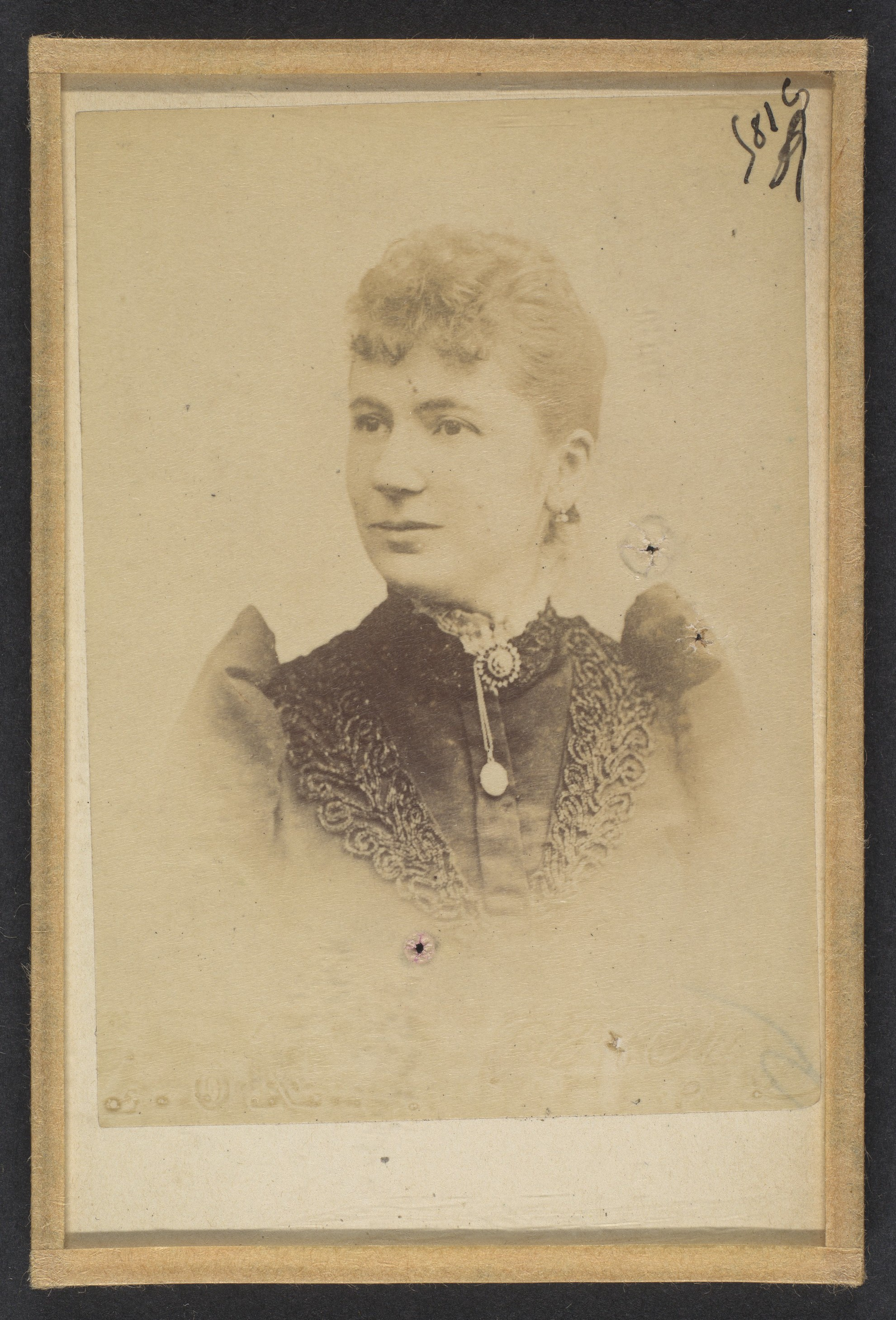
- Élise Pelgrom's mugshot taken by Alphonse Bertillon in 1893
- Born: March 12, 1858; Brussels, Belgium
- Died: January 25, 1910 (aged 51); Paris, France
- Citizenship: Belgium
- Occupations: passementerie worker anarchist
- Known for: Being one of the first illegalists
- Movement: Anarchism
- Spouse: Placide Schouppe (1882-1910)

Élise Pelgrom (18 May 1864 – 25 January 1910) was a Belgian passementerie worker and illegalist anarchist. She is best known for her role in the birth and development of illegalism, being part of the Schouppe gang and linked to the Intransigents of London and Paris, some of the first illegalist groups. Pelgrom and her husband, Placide Schouppe, were also close to Vittorio Pini, one of the main founders of this anarchist tendency.

Born in Belgium and having married Schouppe in Paris, the couple began to integrate into the nascent illegalist anarchist circles in the second half of the 1880s. She associated with a number of figures from the anarchist movement of that period, such as Vittorio Pini, and seemed to be involved in the Intransigents' burglaries, leading to her being denounced as one of the group's main members by an anarchist. Arrested with Pini and Schouppe, she denied any participation or knowledge of anything, while her husband was sentenced to ten years of deportation to a penal colony. This situation plunged her into deep poverty, especially as she had two children to support. She then began a relationship with and moved in with a sculptor named Strauch.

Following Schouppe's escape from the Cayenne penal colony in 1891, she either feared for her life or returned to live with him with satisfaction, depending on the media accounts of the time. Strauch refused to return the furniture she had brought to his home, so she burglarized his residence with Schouppe and probably Léon Ortiz and Antoinette Cazal from the Ortiz gang. The furniture they recovered was more extensive than what she had brought to his place, but the group managed to avoid French authorities. The anarchist was suspected by them of having planted the bomb during the Carmaux-Bons Enfants bombing, but Émile Henry—who was her neighbor—declared he barely knew her and was solely responsible.

Pelgrom died in 1910 in Paris.

One of her police mugshots is part of the collections of the Metropolitan Museum of Art (MET).

== Biography ==
=== Youth ===
Élisabeth Pelgrom was born on 18 May 1864 in Brussels. She married Placide Schouppe in Paris on 4 July 1882. The couple had two children: Julienne Schouppe (born 1881, legitimized by her parents after their marriage) and Edmond Schouppe (born 1883). She worked as a passementerie worker until 1887, then became a seamstress, and later a chorister at the Théâtre de la Gaité. She eventually left this job and stopped working altogether.

=== Anarchism and illegalism ===
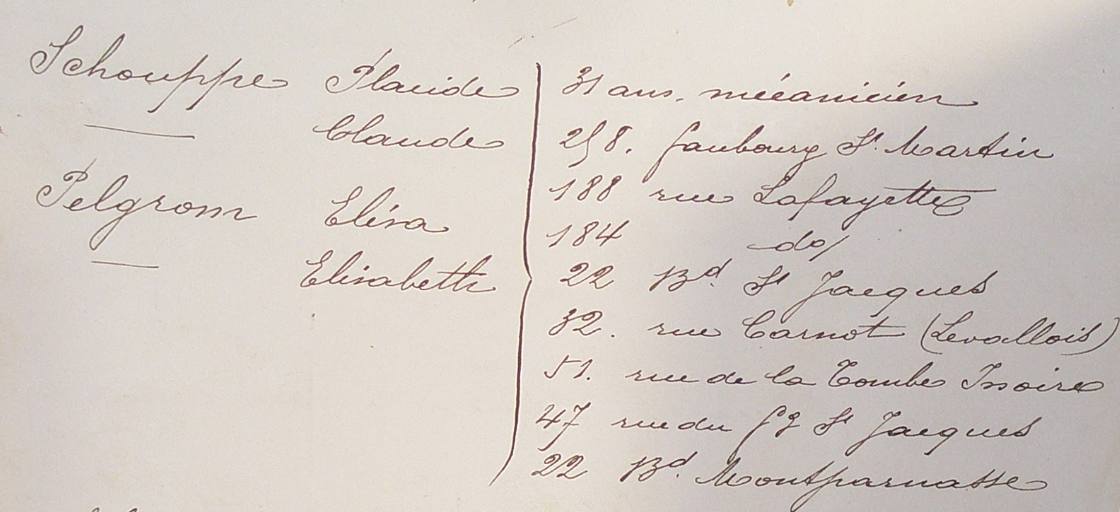
French police report on the addresses of Schouppes and Pelgroms (courtesy of Archives anarchistes)

Concurrently, in the second half of the 1880s, Pelgrom was a member of the burgeoning Parisian illegalist anarchist circles. She was notably in contact with Vittorio Pini, one of the founders of illegalism, and was linked to the Intransigents of London and Paris, one of the first illegalist groups. During this period, anonymous testimonies accused her of neglecting her children, claiming she let them roam freely in the streets and that they were constantly at neighbors' houses.

She joined Schouppe in London in 1889 and was hosted by Alessandro Marocco, a fence for the Intransigents. Luigi Parmeggiani also lived in that residence. She also met the anarchist Fabre there and remained in London to visit the city, while Schouppe returned to the continent after a week with her.

When Pini was arrested and his home raided, he did not denounce anyone, but the police arrested Fabre at his place. Fabre, who died in police custody, denounced his four alleged main accomplices: Pini, Schouppe, Pelgrom, and Maria Saënen, an illegalist who was also Pini's partner.

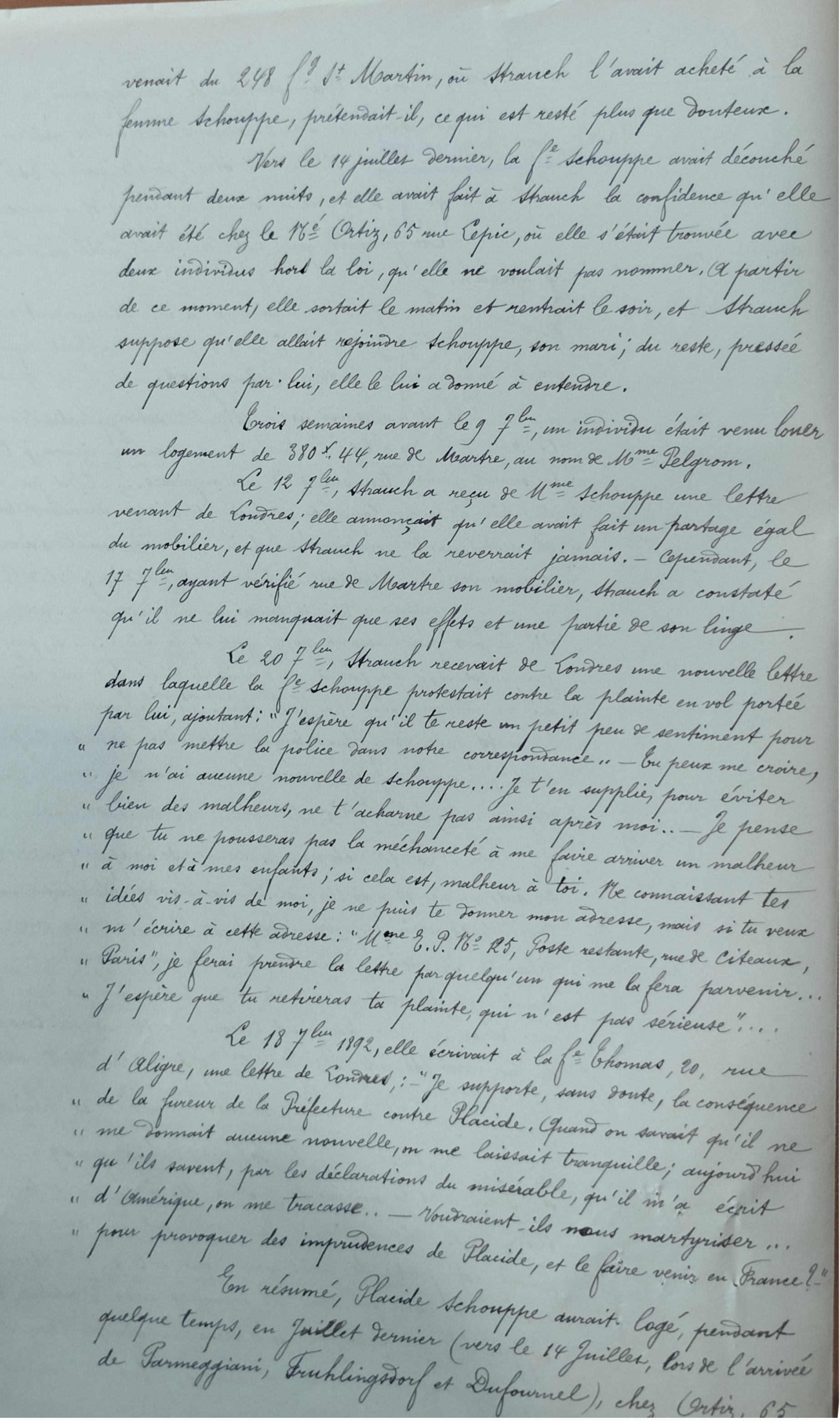
Police report on Pelgrom giving some of her correspondence (courtesy of Archives anarchistes)

Pelgrom was arrested on 20 June 1889 and refused to give her identity to the police, who had to discover it by searching through documents seized from her home. Authorities found a substantial amount of loot at her residence, originating from burglaries of private mansions or Parisian bourgeois homes—jewelry, silverware, stolen securities, and other goods. She was put on trial for fencing stolen goods.

During her incarceration, she was allowed to leave once to visit her children. In November 1889, Pelgrom appeared with Pini, Saënen, Placide, and Julien Schouppe (his brother) at their trial. The anarchist denied having heard of the alleged facts, stating that Schouppe had told her the money from the burglaries came from his employment, which did not convince the prosecutor, who accused her of being fully aware. However, he requested a significant sentence against all the accused except her; and the jurors acquitted her, while Pini received twenty years of deportation to a penal colony, Placide Schouppe ten years, Julien Schouppe five, and Saënen two years in prison. She burst into tears upon her acquittal and thanked the judge.

When her husband was deported and with two children to support, Pelgrom fell into deep poverty. She then moved in with a sculptor named Strauch, who became her lover, bringing her children with her. The relationship appeared peaceful, but Schouppe managed to escape from the penal colony eighteen months later, in 1891.

The press offered two different versions of her reaction to his return: she either feared him and dreaded his return, or she happily resumed living with Schouppe upon his reappearance. She asked Strauch to return the furniture she had brought to his home, but he refused. Pelgrom, Schouppe, Léon Ortiz, and Antoinette Cazal then burglarized Strauch's home, taking other furniture in addition to Pelgrom's own. Strauch repfiled a complaint, and the police noted that Pelgrom and Schouppe had been staying with Ortiz and Cazal, but they were unable to arrest or implicate them.

The following year, in 1892, she was in London and wrote to the French press, complaining about the police, journalists, and Strauch.

=== Carmaux-Bons Enfants bombing ===
In March 1894, following Émile Henry's confessions regarding the Carmaux-Bons Enfants bombing in November 1892—an attack where a woman, possibly Adrienne Chailliey, was thought to be involved in planting the bomb—Pelgrom was arrested. She was suspected of being responsible for the bombing and of being Émile Henry's lover. Although they lived on the same street, Henry insisted he was the sole perpetrator of the attack. He maintained that he didn't know Pelgrom well and had only a distant acquaintance with her.

=== Late years and death ===
Pelgrom died on 25 January 1910 in Paris.

=== Police mugshot ===
One of her police mugshots is part of the collections of the Metropolitan Museum of Art (MET).

== Bibliography ==
- Bouhey, Vivien (2008), Les Anarchistes contre la République [The Anarchists against the Republic] (in French), Rennes: Presses universitaires de Rennes (PUR)
- Petit, Dominique (2024), PELGROM Elisabeth dite Elise, Henriette, Paris: Le Maitron
