= Martin Roháč =

Czech robber and serial killer

- Born: ? Velká Bíteš, Moravia
- Died: 17 February 1571; Velká Bíteš, Moravia
- Cause of death: Execution by breaking wheel
- Occupation: Soldier
- Known for: Alleged highest number of victims for a serial killer in the Czech lands
- Conviction: Confessed under torture
- Criminal charges: Murder, robbery, cannibalism
- Penalty: Phalangial amputation, body torn with pliers, breaking of limbs, and finally entangled on the breaking wheel

Details
- Date: 7 February 1571 (ruling delivered)
- Span of crimes: 1568–1571
- Killed: 59

Martin Roháč (? – 17 February 1571) was a Czech soldier, later a robber and serial killer with the alleged highest number of victims in the Czech lands. He came from Velká Bíteš. With his robbery group, he murdered 59 people between 1568 and 1571.

== Life ==
As a soldier, he participated in the war with Turkey between 1566 and 1568. It ended with the Adrianople peace, and he was therefore released from the service. Together with several other soldiers, he began to kidnap and murder. Their victims were mainly defenceless merchants and craftsmen whom they stole money, goods and usually clothing from.

The first murders were committed in Transylvania, where 4 people were killed by the group. They were robbed of 24 gold and clothing. Another victim was a merchant near Vienna who was robbed of 40 gold, two gloves and a garment. At Augsburg, they committed two murders. They also stole weapons from the victims this time. The following killings were committed at Stupava, under Bratislava; in Uherské Hradiště, Uherský Brod, near Bánov (today's Velké Bílovice) and in Hustopeče, where one of the men murdered three men in one day and stole three women's skirts. Other murders occurred in Újezd, Poštorná and Ivančice.

After these crimes, some members of the group decided to leave. Only two – Mikuláš Miča from Předklášteří and Jan Čech – remained with him. Their cruelty then increased. For example, in Mělník, Čáslav and Chrudim they murdered three pregnant women, carved four fruit shapes into them and cut out the hearts, lungs, and liver of the unborn children, which they later cooked and ate. They believed it would give them courage and strength to murder more.

In 1571 Mikuláš Miča was captured in Tišnov. At the time only Roháč was active. Miča was tortured and eventually confessed, soon leading to the arrest of Roháč in Velká Bíteš. He was also tortured and eventually confessed to the murders.

The ruling of Martin Roháč was delivered on 7 February 1571. It was as cruel as the accused's own crimes. At first, his phalanges of fingers were gradually removed at the pillory and then he was brought to the execution site where he had his body torn with pliers, next all his limbs would be shuffled around him, finally being entangled on the breaking wheel, awaiting death. The sentence was carried out by the Brno executioner on the convict and his six assistants on 17 February 1571.

== See also ==
- List of serial killers by country
