= Anarchist bombing campaign of 1888–1889 =

Series of attacks in Paris, France

- Part of propaganda of the deed
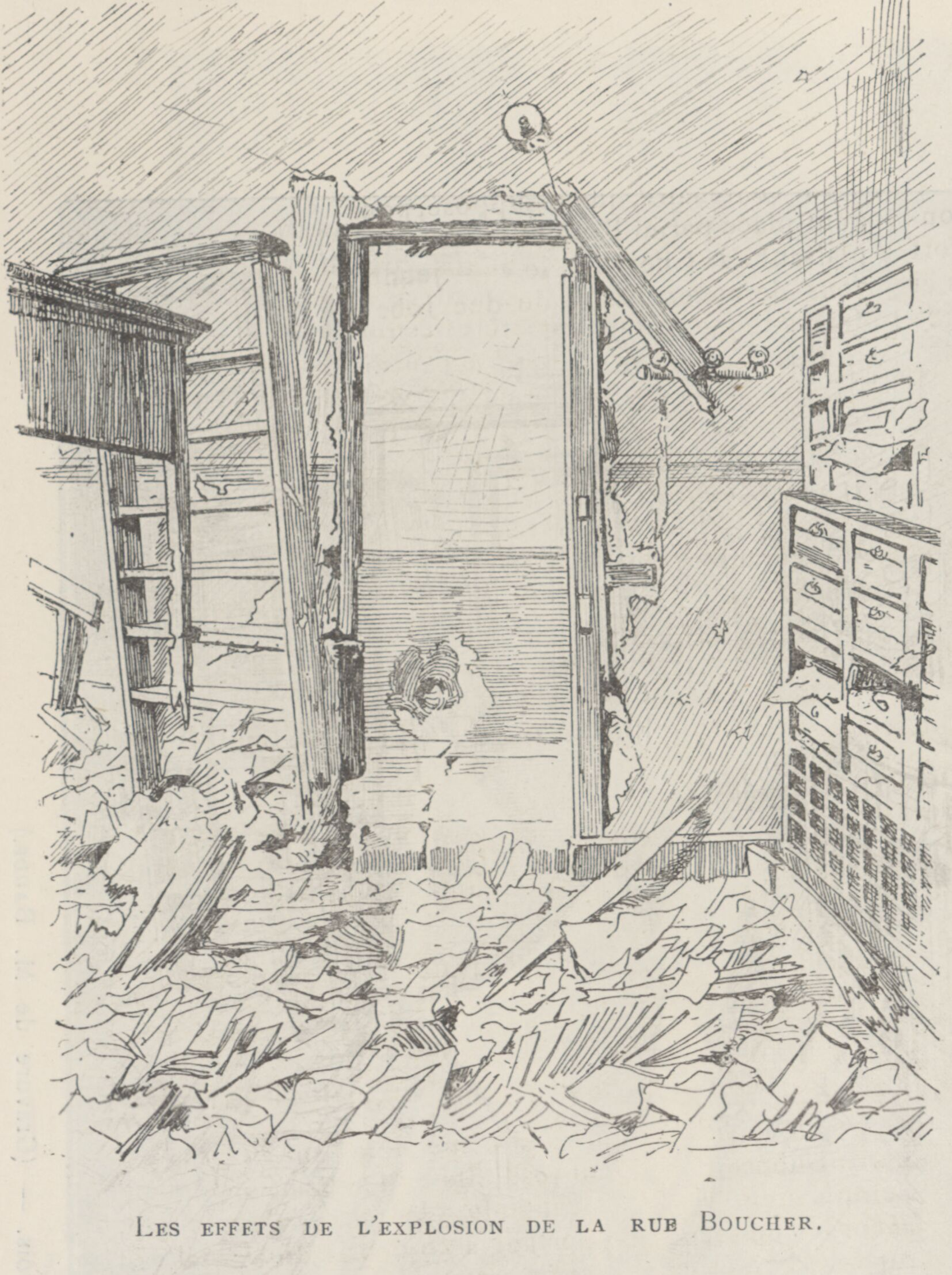
- 7 November 1888 bombings, in Le Monde illustré, here the one on Rue Boucher
- Date: 1888 – 1889
- Location: France
- Methods: Propaganda of the deed, terrorism
- Result: Anarchist victory (recess of employment agencies)

Parties
France	Anarchists

Lead figures
Sadi Carnot; Marie-François Goron	Placide Schouppe (?); Intransigents of London and Paris (?)

Casualties and losses
1 injured	0

The anarchist bombing campaign of 1888–1889 refers to a series of propaganda of the deed acts carried out by anarchists in France between August 1888 and June 1889. Roughly a dozen bombings and attempted bombings targeted bureaux de placement (placing offices) and police stations. In France, this campaign predates the more well-known Ère des attentats (1892–1894).

In the late 1880s, the complex social situation in France, coupled with the continued existence of bureaux de placement, employment agencies supposedly designed to help the unemployed find work but in reality closely aligned with employer interests, pushed a number of anarchists to undertake terrorist actions against these agencies. The entire series of attacks resulted in only one injury, as most of them occurred in the middle of the night when the targeted locations were empty.

French authorities suspected a significant number of anarchists, leading to raids and arrests, with suspicions on Placide Schouppe. However, the precise individuals responsible for this campaign remain unknown. The practice of operating those employment agencies gradually disappeared, due to both the increased danger of owning one and the authorities' growing reevaluation of their role after the campaign.

== History ==
=== Context ===
In the 19th century, anarchism emerged and developed in Europe before spreading globally. Anarchists advocate for the struggle against all perceived forms of unjust domination, including economic domination arising from the development of capitalism. They are particularly opposed to the State, viewing it as the institution that sanctions many of these dominations through its police, army, and propaganda.

In the late 1870s, anarchists developed the strategy of propaganda by the deed, aiming to convey anarchist ideas directly through action, without relying on discourse. Figures in the anarchist movement such as Peter Kropotkin, Errico Malatesta, Andrea Costa, and Carlo Cafiero extensively developed this strategy. In 1879, it was adopted by the congress of the Jura Federation in La Chaux-de-Fonds. In 1880, it was discussed in Vevey during a meeting that produced a charter of propaganda by the deed, which was adopted the following year by the first exclusively anarchist congress in France, the Paris congress, in May 1881. It gained renewed centrality at the International Congress in London in July 1881.

The first attack of this nature in France, the Thiers statue bombing in 1881, failed to destroy its target. Anarchist attacks continued in the following years, and the practice gradually gained ground in France, aided by the arrival of new explosives like dynamite. A major proponent of this tactic was the anarchist Johann Most.

Moreover, the social situation in the 1880s was extremely difficult for a significant portion of the French population, who lived in great poverty. At the heart of the labor market during this period were bureaux de placement or employment agencies, private agencies responsible for finding work for the unemployed. In theory, this system was supposed to guarantee "meritocratic" access to jobs. In practice, however, these agencies were closely aligned with French bourgeoisie and acted as competitors to the nascent trade unions. They also facilitated the surveillance of workers by businesses or the state. Consequently, they were viewed very negatively by workers in France, especially as they were struggling to keep up with the evolving nature of work during the Second Industrial Revolution.

Since 1886, socialists had been advocating for legal action, such as petitions, to abolish employment agencies. This situation greatly displeased workers, who felt aggrieved and began to gravitate towards anarchism and the concept of propaganda of the deed.

=== Anarchist bombing campaign of 1888–1889 ===
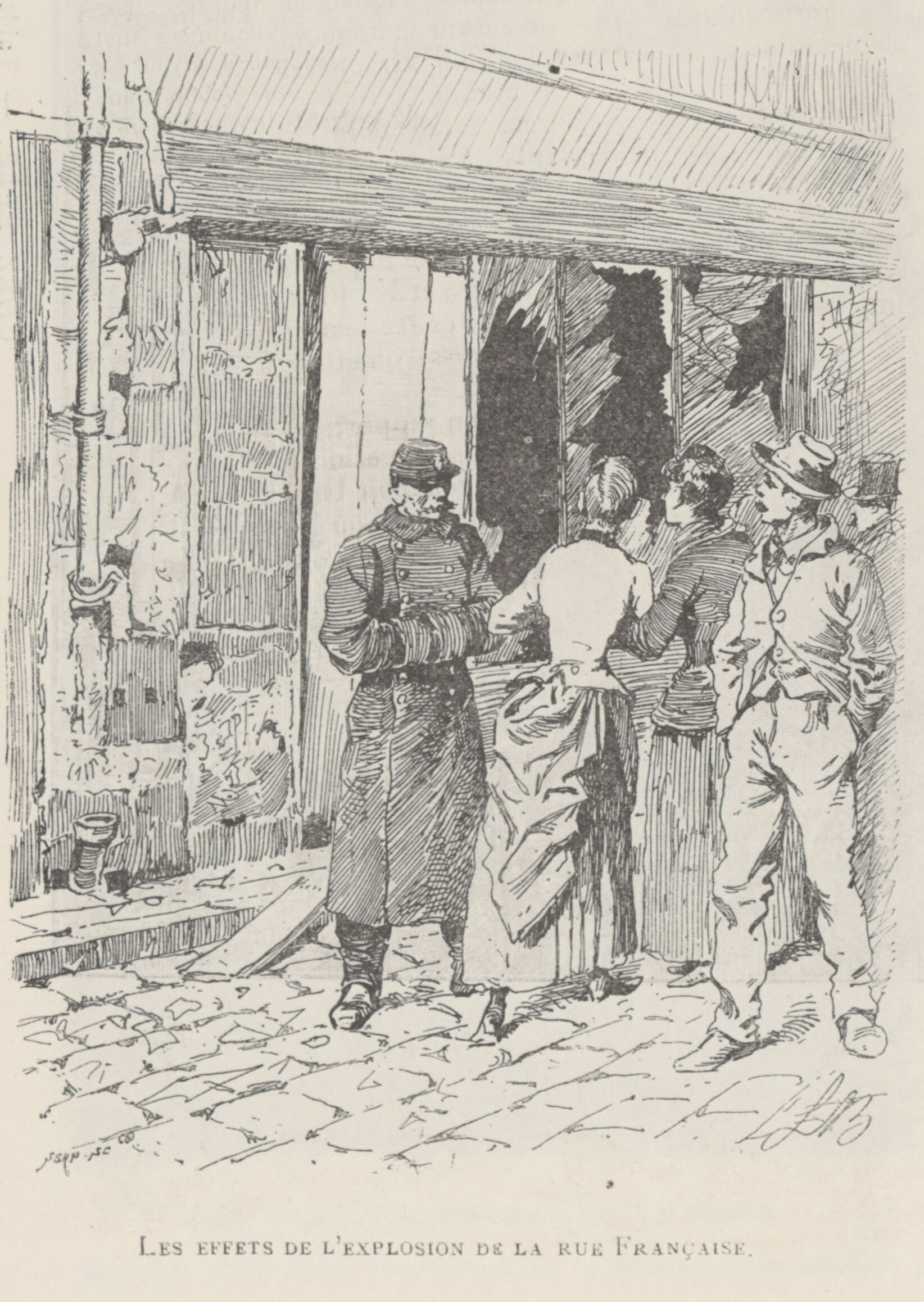
7 November 1888 bombings, in Le Monde illustré, here the one on Rue Française

On 24 August 1888, an explosive device was placed on a stair leading to an employment agency at 7 rue Chénier, Paris, around midnight. It exploded, dislodging some stones, but didn't damage the building.

On 7 October 1888, the same agency was targeted again, this time by a bomb placed around 2:00 am. It exploded about ten minutes later and was composed of lead, zinc, and antimony. While it didn't destroy the office, it caused a loud noise and shattered windows on the street.

Exactly one month later, on 7 November 1888, two employment agencies for lemonade vendors were targeted around 1:00 am. The attack on rue Française caused the ground-floor office to explode, injuring a patrolling police officer in the eye from glass shards. The other, on rue Boucher, targeted the office director's door, exploding inside the building. In both cases, dynamite appeared to have been used.

During the night of 21 to 22 November 1888, the Chaussée d'Antin police station was targeted with a similar attack, but the dynamite cartridge failed to explode. The police secretary discovered it under the door when he arrived at the station at 9:00 am the following morning. Police intensified searches during this period but without success.

On 5 December 1888, an attack on an employment agency for waiters and waitresses on rue Saint-Denis was foiled.

On 21 December 1888, a small bomb was placed in a cellar beneath the police station offices on rue de la Perle. It produced only a minor explosion, and the damage was negligible.

On 12 March 1889, a bomb was thrown into the basement of the rue de la Ceriseraie police station. A police officer descended and spotted the bomb, preventing its explosion.

The final attack of this period occurred on 3 June 1889, when a dynamite cartridge exploded during the night at a police station, causing no damage.

=== Aftermath and perpetrators ===
French authorities conducted extensive investigations to identify the culprits but were ultimately unsuccessful. Jean Grave, a prominent figure in the anarchist movement of that period, later wrote about the campaign:

Around 1888, a violent campaign was waged against employment agencies [...]. Bombs were placed in some of these exploitative offices. In truth, they made more noise than harm, but they spread terror. One of those who distinguished himself most in this campaign was a man named Souday, who soon after disappeared from the movement.

A few months later, when French police raided Placide Schouppe, they suspected him of being one of the perpetrators of the campaign, though no charges followed. According to Vivien Bouhey, this campaign was undertaken by certain anarchists who were coordinated, suggesting these were not entirely isolated or unrelated acts.

=== Results ===
Given the increased risk of owning an employment agency, the practice began to decline starting in 1889. By 1890, authorities became more hesitant to grant new operating licenses, leading to their gradual disappearance.

== Primary sources ==
=== Police archives ===
Collection of the site-archive Archives Anarchistes uploaded to Commons comprising, from the Archives de la préfecture de police de Paris:

- Ba 138 — 1888-1889 Bureaux de placement bombings (362 pages)
- Ba 138 — 1888 Chaussée d'Antin police station bombing (5 pages)
- Ba 139 — 1889 Quai des archives police station bombing (54 pages)
- Ba 139 — 1889 rue des Colonnes police station bombing (19 pages)

== Bibliography ==
- Bouhey, Vivien (2008), Les Anarchistes contre la République [The Anarchists against the Republic] (in French), Rennes: Presses universitaires de Rennes (PUR), ISBN 9782753507272
- Eisenzweig, Uri (2001). Fictions de l'anarchisme [Fictions of anarchism] (in French). France: C. Bourgois. ISBN 2-267-01570-6.
- Jourdain, Edouard (2013). L'anarchisme [Anarchism]. Paris: La Découverte. ISBN 978-2-7071-9091-8.
- Merriman, John M. (2016). The dynamite club: how a bombing in fin-de-siècle Paris ignited the age of modern terror. Yale University Press. ISBN 978-0-300-21792-6.
- Petit, Dominique; Samzun, Patrick (2025), "SCHOUPPE, Placide", Dictionnaire international des militants anarchistes, Paris
- Ward, Colin (2004). Anarchism: A Very Short Introduction. Oxford University Press (OUP).
