= Malé Svatoňovice =

- Municipality
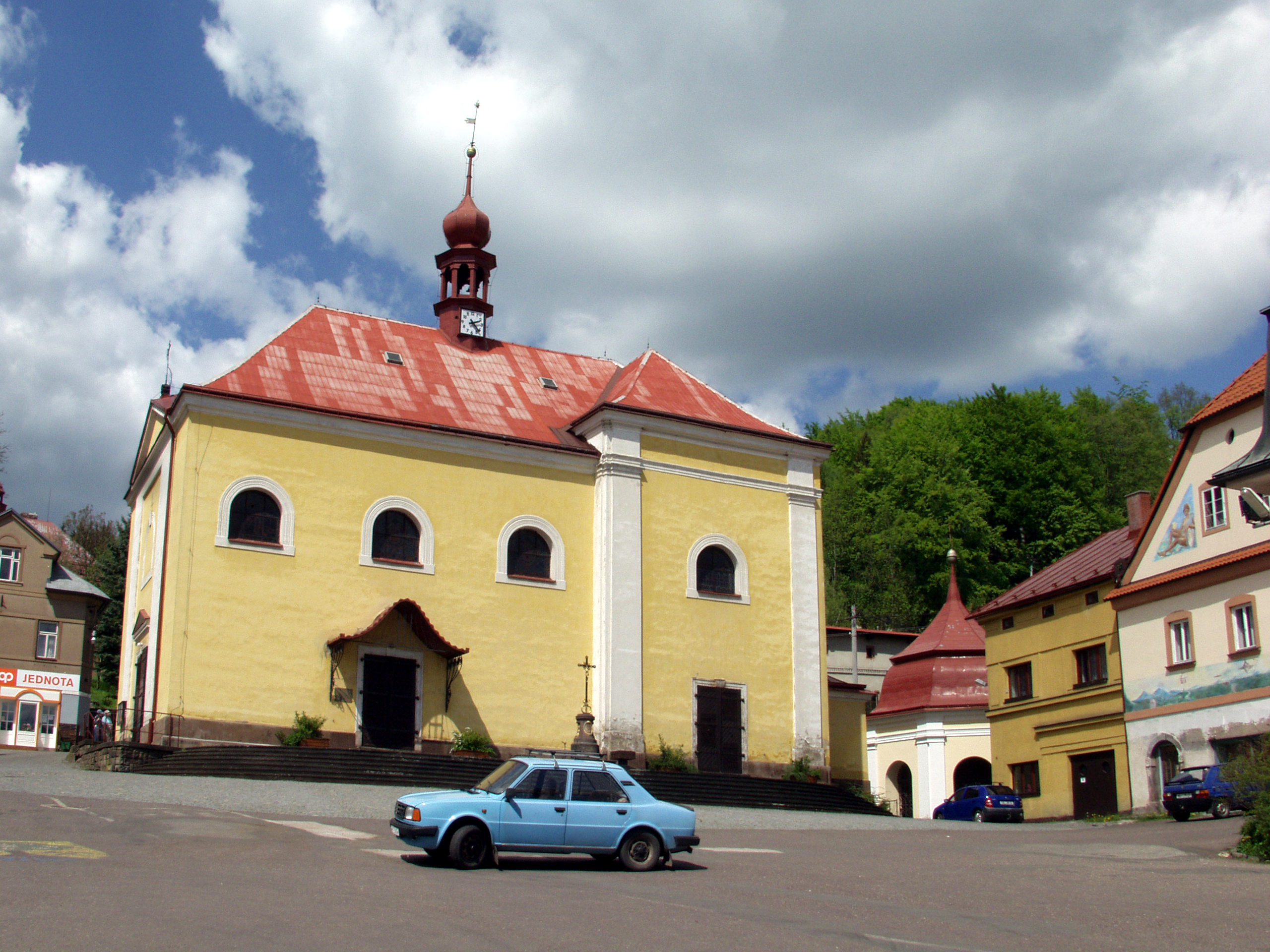
- Church of Seven Joys of the Virgin Mary

- Flag Coat of arms

- Location in the Czech Republic
- Coordinates: 50°32′3″N 16°3′1″E
- Country: Czech Republic
- Region: Hradec Králové
- District: Trutnov
- First mentioned: 1357

Area
  - Total: 6.74 km^{2} (2.60 sq mi)
- Elevation: 441 m (1,447 ft)

Population (2026-01-01)
  - Total: 1,596
  - Density: 237/km^{2} (613/sq mi)
- Time zone: UTC+1 (CET)
  - Summer (DST): UTC+2 (CEST)
- Postal code: 542 34
- Website: www.malesvatonovice.cz

Malé Svatoňovice (Czech pronunciation: [ˈmalɛː ˈsvatoɲovɪtsɛ]; German: Klein Schwadowitz) is a municipality and village in Trutnov District in the Hradec Králové Region of the Czech Republic. It has about 1,600 inhabitants. It is known as the birthplace of writer Karel Čapek.

== Administrative division ==
Malé Svatoňovice consists of four municipal parts (in brackets population according to the 2021 census):

- Malé Svatoňovice (1,197)
- Odolov (307)
- Petrovice (73)
- Strážkovice (99)

== Etymology ==
The name Svatoňovice is derived from the personal name Svatoň, meaning "the village of Svatoň's people". The prefix malé means 'small' and serves to distinguish it from the neighbouring village of Velké Svatoňovice ('great Svatoňovice').

== Geography ==
Malé Svatoňovice is located about 10 kilometres (6 mi) southeast of Trutnov and 38 km (24 mi) northeast of Hradec Králové. It lies in the Broumov Highlands, in its microregion of Jestřebí hory. The highest point is at 714 m (2,343 ft) above sea level.

== History ==
The first written mention of Svatoňovice is from 1357. From the 18th century, flax was grown in the vicinity of the village and the linen industry developed. In 1826, Svatoňovice was divided into Velké Svatoňovice and Malé Svatoňovice, but they merged again in 1850. Since 1880, they have been divided into two separate municipalities.

== Demographics ==
Historical population

Year	Pop.	±%
1869	1,346	—
1880	1,373	+2.0%
1890	1,725	+25.6%
1900	1,768	+2.5%
1910	1,738	−1.7%

Year	Pop.	±%
1921	1,642	−5.5%
1930	1,729	+5.3%
1950	1,446	−16.4%
1961	1,851	+28.0%
1970	1,787	−3.5%

Year	Pop.	±%
1980	1,709	−4.4%
1991	1,502	−12.1%
2001	1,526	+1.6%
2011	1,658	+8.7%
2021	1,676	+1.1%

Source: Censuses

== Transport ==
In the municipality is a large railway station, originally built for use in the coal mining industry in 1857–1859. Malé Svatoňovice lies on an interregional railway line from Prague to Trutnov and on a regional line from Hradec Králové to Svoboda nad Úpou.

== Sights ==
On the square of Malé Svatoňovice is the Baroque Church of Seven Joys of the Virgin Mary from 1734. The church was built on the site of seven springs with allegedly healing effects and became a pilgrimage site. The springs now rise in a chapel, which was built in 1732. The church was rebuilt into its current form in 1830–1831. In the upper part of the municipality are the Stations of the Cross with seven chapels.

There is the Čapek Brothers Museum in the birth house of Karel Čapek. Karel's brother Josef was the first Czech Cubist and some of his work is also displayed in the museum.

== Notable people ==
- Karel Čapek (1890–1938), writer
