= Velké Svatoňovice =

- Municipality
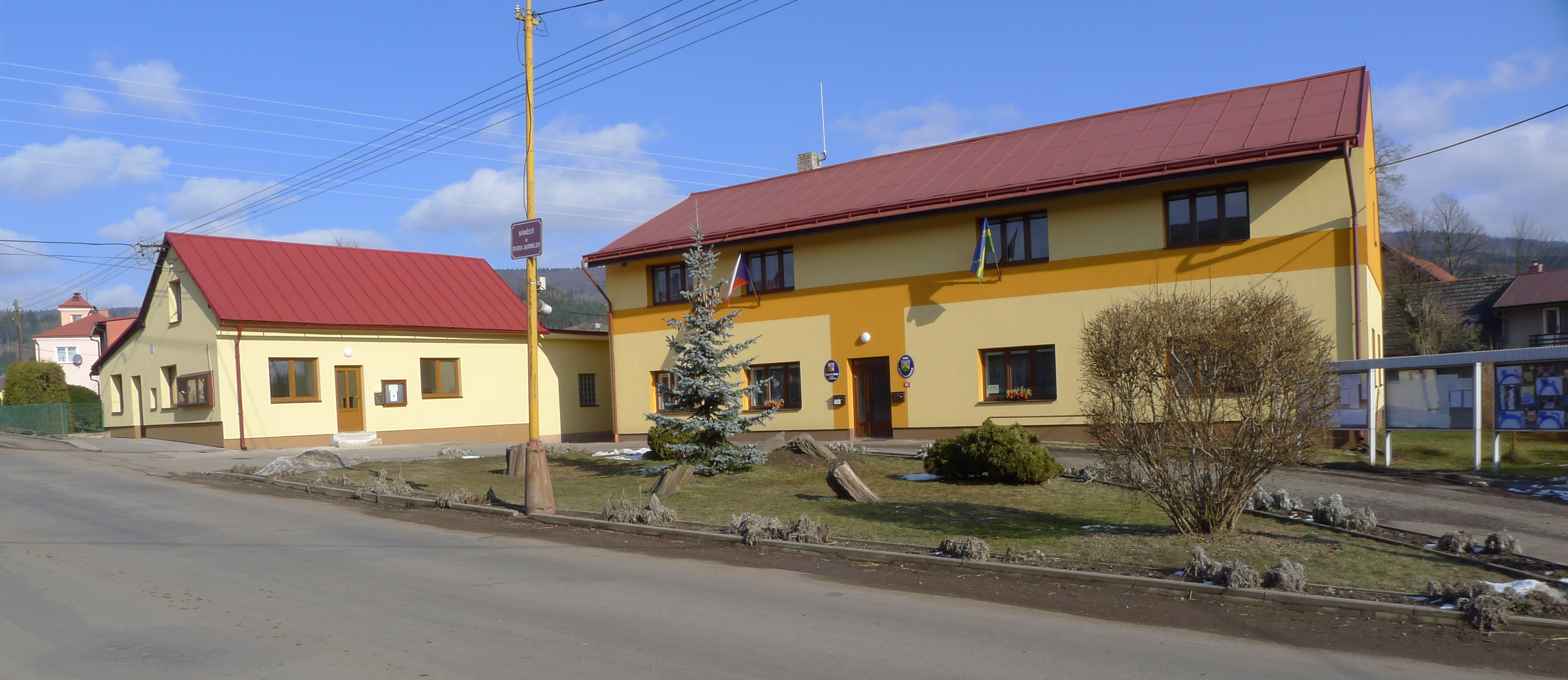
- Municipal office

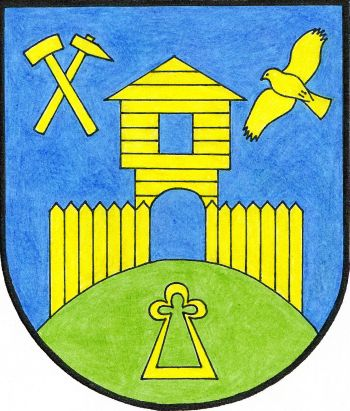
- Flag Coat of arms

- Location in the Czech Republic
- Coordinates: 50°31′57″N 16°1′42″E
- Country: Czech Republic
- Region: Hradec Králové
- District: Trutnov
- First mentioned: 1357

Area
  - Total: 17.35 km^{2} (6.70 sq mi)
- Elevation: 394 m (1,293 ft)

Population (2026-01-01)
  - Total: 1,254
  - Density: 72.28/km^{2} (187.2/sq mi)
- Time zone: UTC+1 (CET)
  - Summer (DST): UTC+2 (CEST)
- Postal codes: 542 32, 542 34, 542 35
- Website: www.velkesvatonovice.cz

Velké Svatoňovice is a municipality and village in Trutnov District in the Hradec Králové Region of the Czech Republic. It has about 1,300 inhabitants.

== Administrative division ==
Velké Svatoňovice consists of two municipal parts (in brackets population according to the 2021 census):

- Velké Svatoňovice (877)
- Markoušovice (342)

== Etymology ==
The name Svatoňovice is derived from the personal name Svatoň, meaning "the village of Svatoň's people". The prefix velké means 'great' and serves to distinguish it from the neighbouring village of Malé Svatoňovice ('small Svatoňovice').

== Demographics ==
Historical population
Year	Pop.	±%
1869	2,864	—
1880	3,087	+7.8%
1890	2,659	−13.9%
1900	2,438	−8.3%
1910	2,340	−4.0%
1921	2,136	−8.7%
1930	2,280	+6.7%
1950	1,575	−30.9%
1961	1,536	−2.5%
1970	1,377	−10.4%
1980	1,167	−15.3%
1991	1,115	−4.5%
2001	1,108	−0.6%
2011	1,212	+9.4%
2021	1,219	+0.6%
Source: Censuses
