= Pernštejnské Jestřabí =

- Municipality
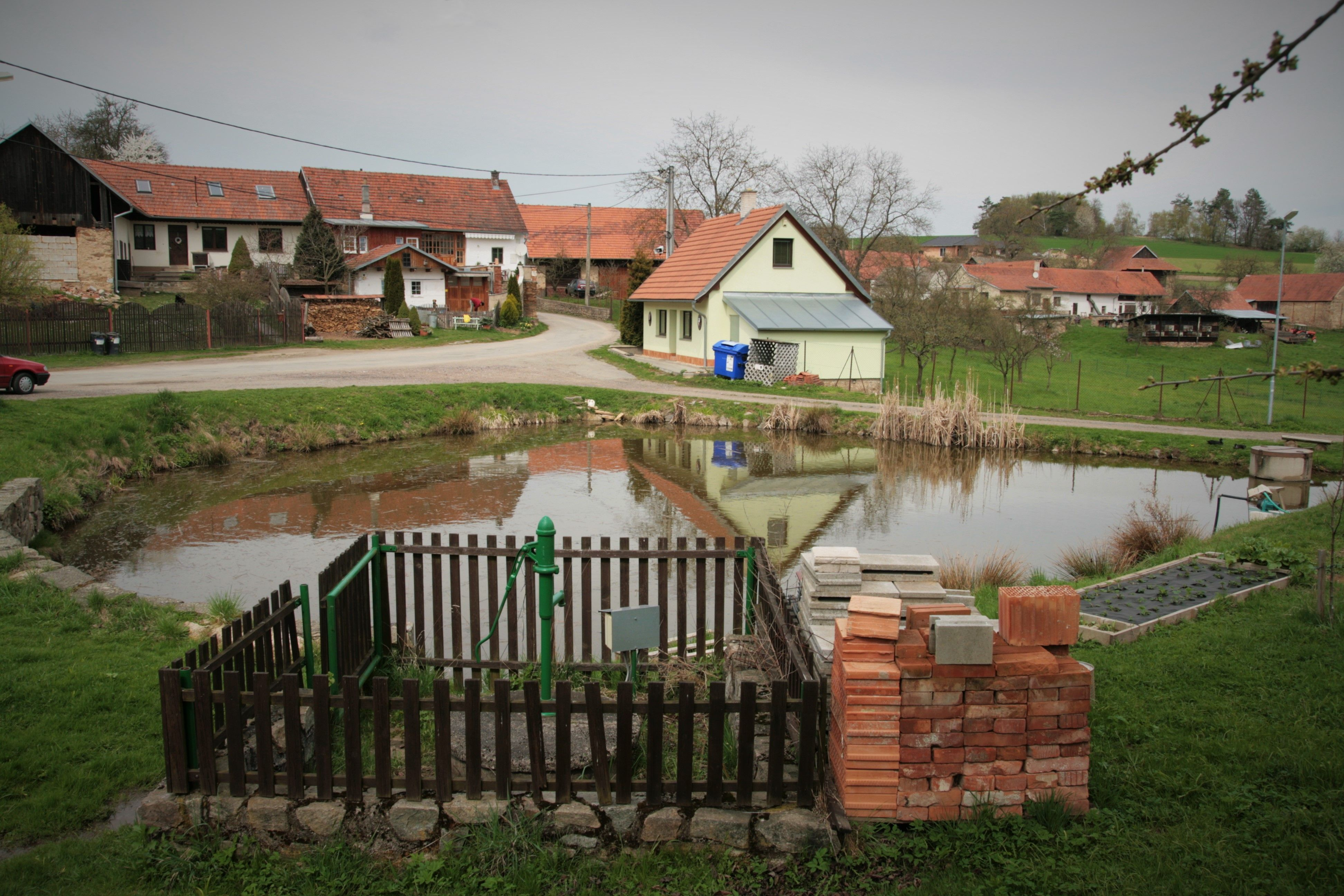
- Centre of Pernštejnské Jestřabí

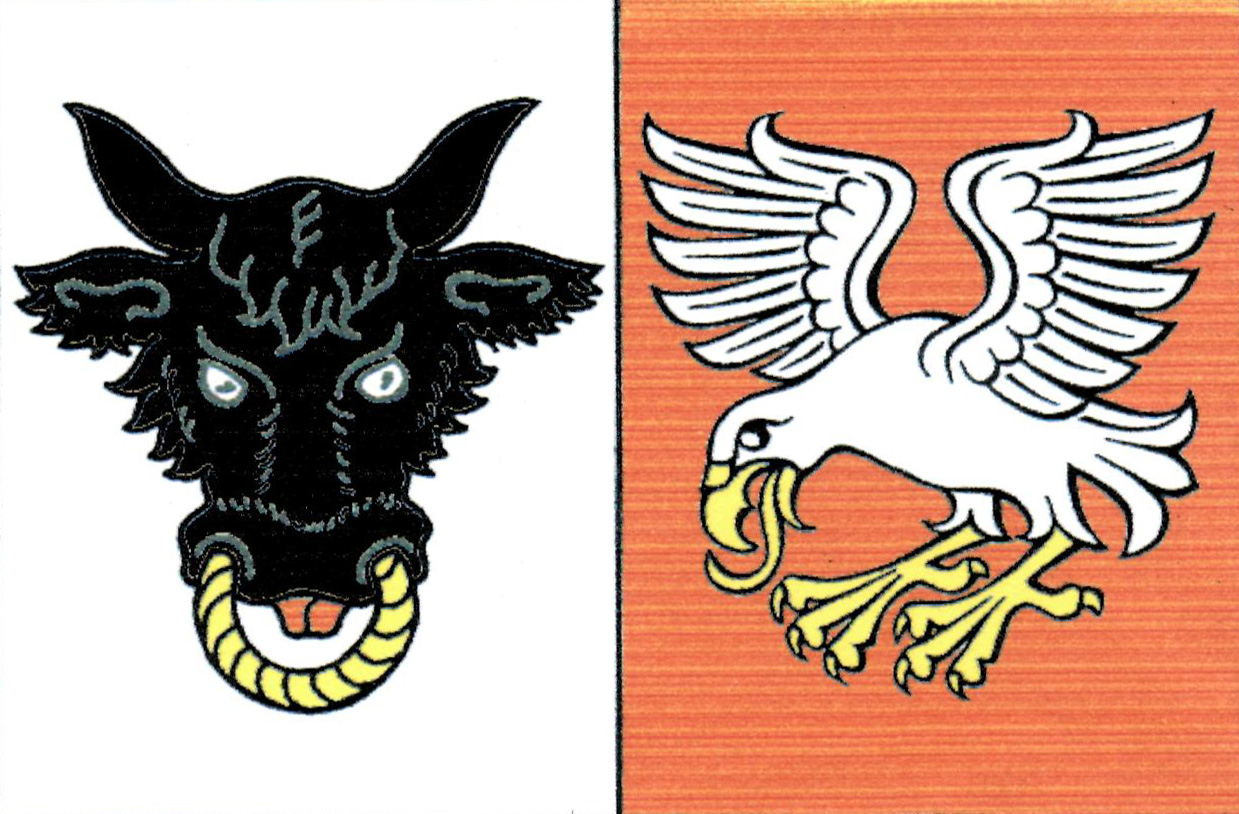
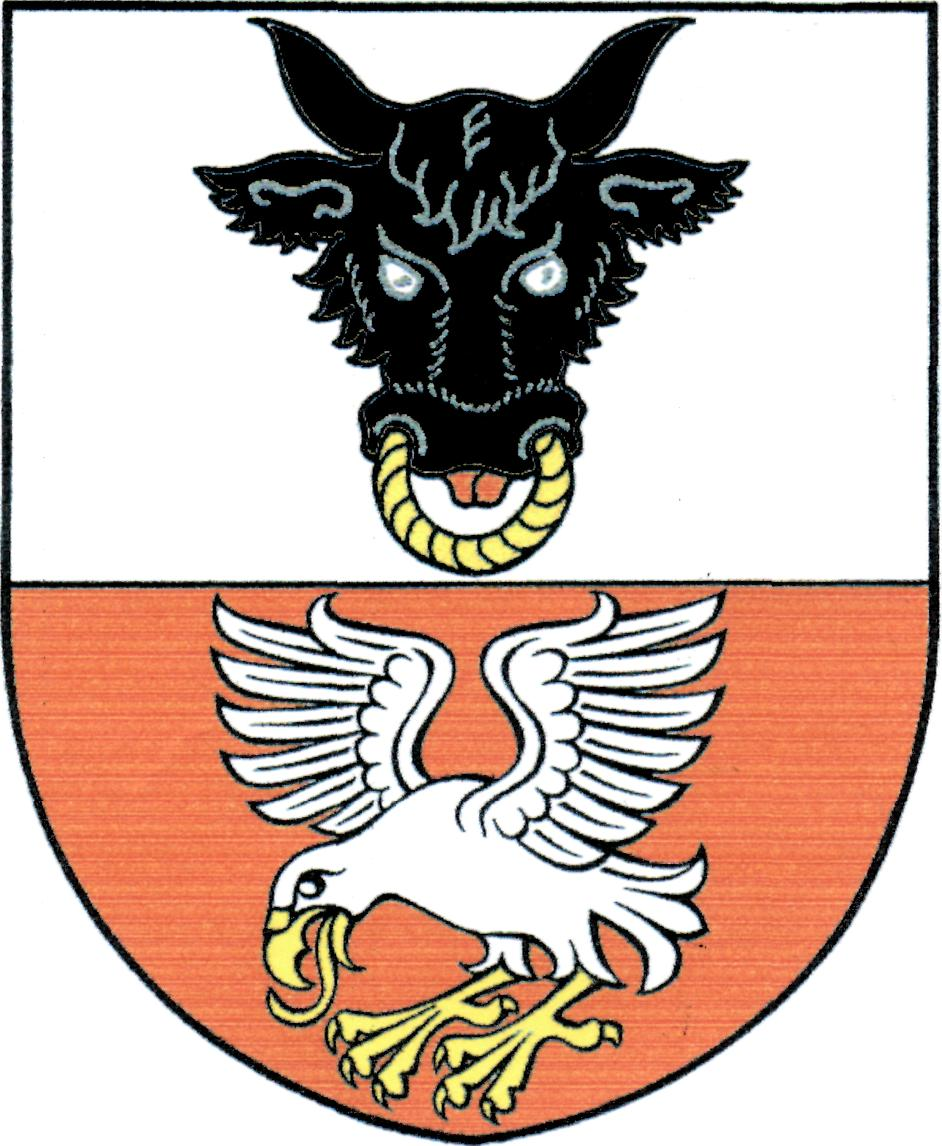
- Flag Coat of arms

- Location in the Czech Republic
- Coordinates: 49°24′23″N 16°19′32″E
- Country: Czech Republic
- Region: South Moravian
- District: Brno-Country
- First mentioned: 1364

Area
  - Total: 7.52 km^{2} (2.90 sq mi)
- Elevation: 485 m (1,591 ft)

Population (2026-01-01)
  - Total: 216
  - Density: 28.7/km^{2} (74.4/sq mi)
- Time zone: UTC+1 (CET)
  - Summer (DST): UTC+2 (CEST)
- Postal code: 592 61
- Website: www.pernstejnskejestrabi.cz

Pernštejnské Jestřabí is a municipality and village in Brno-Country District in the South Moravian Region of the Czech Republic. It has about 200 inhabitants.

Pernštejnské Jestřabí lies approximately 32 kilometres (20 mi) north-west of Brno and 157 km (98 mi) south-east of Prague.

== Administrative division ==
Pernštejnské Jestřabí consists of four municipal parts (in brackets population according to the 2021 census):

- Pernštejnské Jestřabí (58)
- Husle (23)
- Jilmoví (61)
- Maňová (51)

== Demographics ==
Historical population
Year	Pop.	±%
1869	366	—
1880	427	+16.7%
1890	388	−9.1%
1900	380	−2.1%
1910	392	+3.2%
1921	371	−5.4%
1930	396	+6.7%
1950	315	−20.5%
1961	289	−8.3%
1970	282	−2.4%
1980	249	−11.7%
1991	186	−25.3%
2001	178	−4.3%
2011	157	−11.8%
2021	193	+22.9%
Source: Censuses
