= Velká Bíteš =

- Town
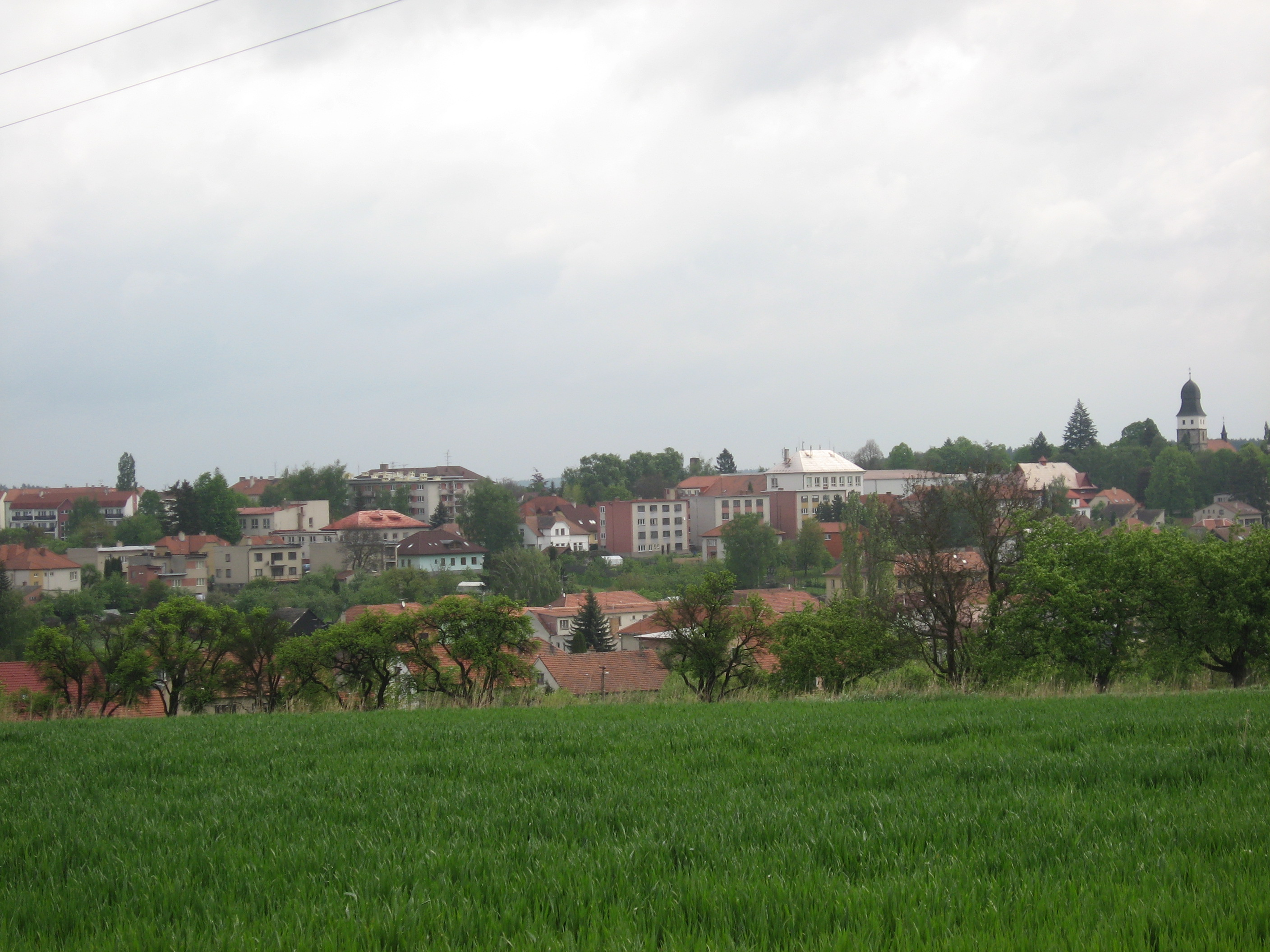
- View towards the town

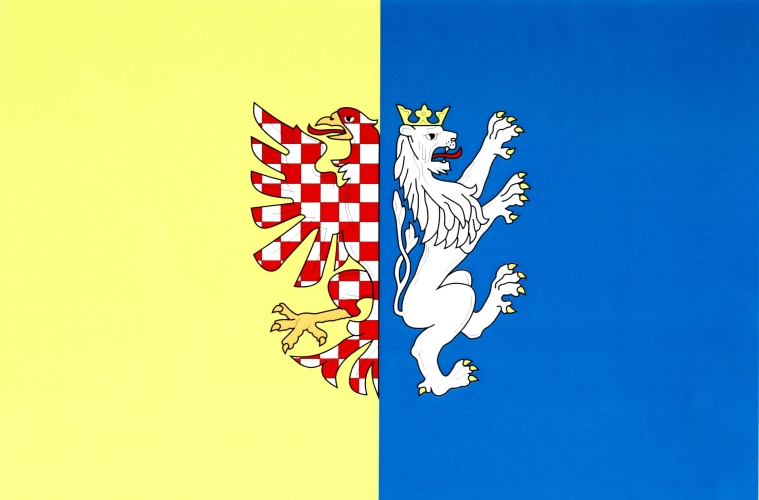
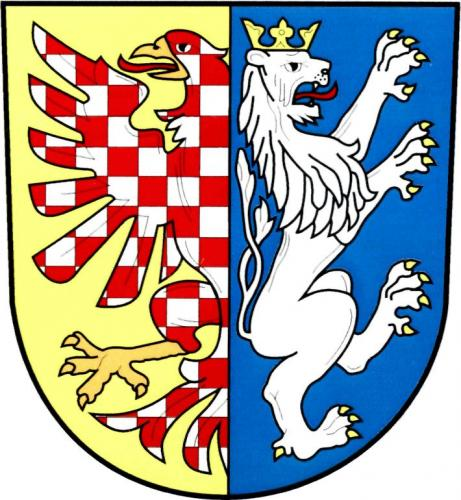
- Flag Coat of arms

- Location in the Czech Republic
- Coordinates: 49°17′37″N 16°13′14″E
- Country: Czech Republic
- Region: Vysočina
- District: Žďár nad Sázavou
- First mentioned: 1240

Government
  - Mayor: Markéta Lavická

Area
  - Total: 47.30 km^{2} (18.26 sq mi)
- Elevation: 476 m (1,562 ft)

Population (2026-01-01)
  - Total: 5,535
  - Density: 117.0/km^{2} (303.1/sq mi)
- Time zone: UTC+1 (CET)
  - Summer (DST): UTC+2 (CEST)
- Postal codes: 594 53, 595 01
- Website: www.vbites.cz

Velká Bíteš (Czech pronunciation: [ˈvɛlkaː ˈbiːtɛʃ]; until 1924 Velká Byteš) is a town in Žďár nad Sázavou District in the Vysočina Region of the Czech Republic. It has about 5,500 inhabitants. The town is located on the Bítýška Stream in the Křižanov Highlands. Velká Bíteš is an industrial town.

Velká Bíteš was founded in the first half of the 13th century and became a town in 1408. The historic town centre is well preserved and is protected as an urban monument zone. The main landmark is the Church of Saint John the Baptist.

== Administrative division ==
Velká Bíteš consists of 11 municipal parts (in brackets population according to the 2021 census):

- Velká Bíteš (3,499)
- Bezděkov (72)
- Březka (127)
- Holubí Zhoř (156)
- Jáchymov (80)
- Janovice (833)
- Jestřabí (50)
- Jindřichov (78)
- Košíkov (188)
- Ludvíkov (42)
- Pánov (15)

Pánov forms an exclave of the municipal territory.

== Geography ==
Velká Bíteš is located about 35 kilometres (22 mi) southeast of Žďár nad Sázavou and 27 km (17 mi) west of Brno. It lies in the Křižanov Highlands. The highest point is at 530 m (1,740 ft) above sea level. The Bítýška Stream flows through the town.

== History ==
The first written mention of Velká Bíteš is from 1240, when the church was mentioned. The settlement was founded in the first half of the 13th century. In the mid-14th century, it was a market town and in 1408, it was promoted to a town.

The greatest development occurred after the Hussite Wars, but the town was severely damaged during the Thirty Years' War and recovered slowly. Velká Bíteš was not industrialised until 1950, when a large engineering company was founded. Thanks to this, the population increased significantly.

== Demographics ==
Historical population

Year	Pop.	±%
1869	3,406	—
1880	3,527	+3.6%
1890	3,361	−4.7%
1900	3,237	−3.7%
1910	3,126	−3.4%

Year	Pop.	±%
1921	3,046	−2.6%
1930	2,992	−1.8%
1950	2,807	−6.2%
1961	3,217	+14.6%
1970	3,435	+6.8%

Year	Pop.	±%
1980	4,272	+24.4%
1991	4,652	+8.9%
2001	4,889	+5.1%
2011	5,042	+3.1%
2021	5,140	+1.9%

Source: Censuses

== Economy ==
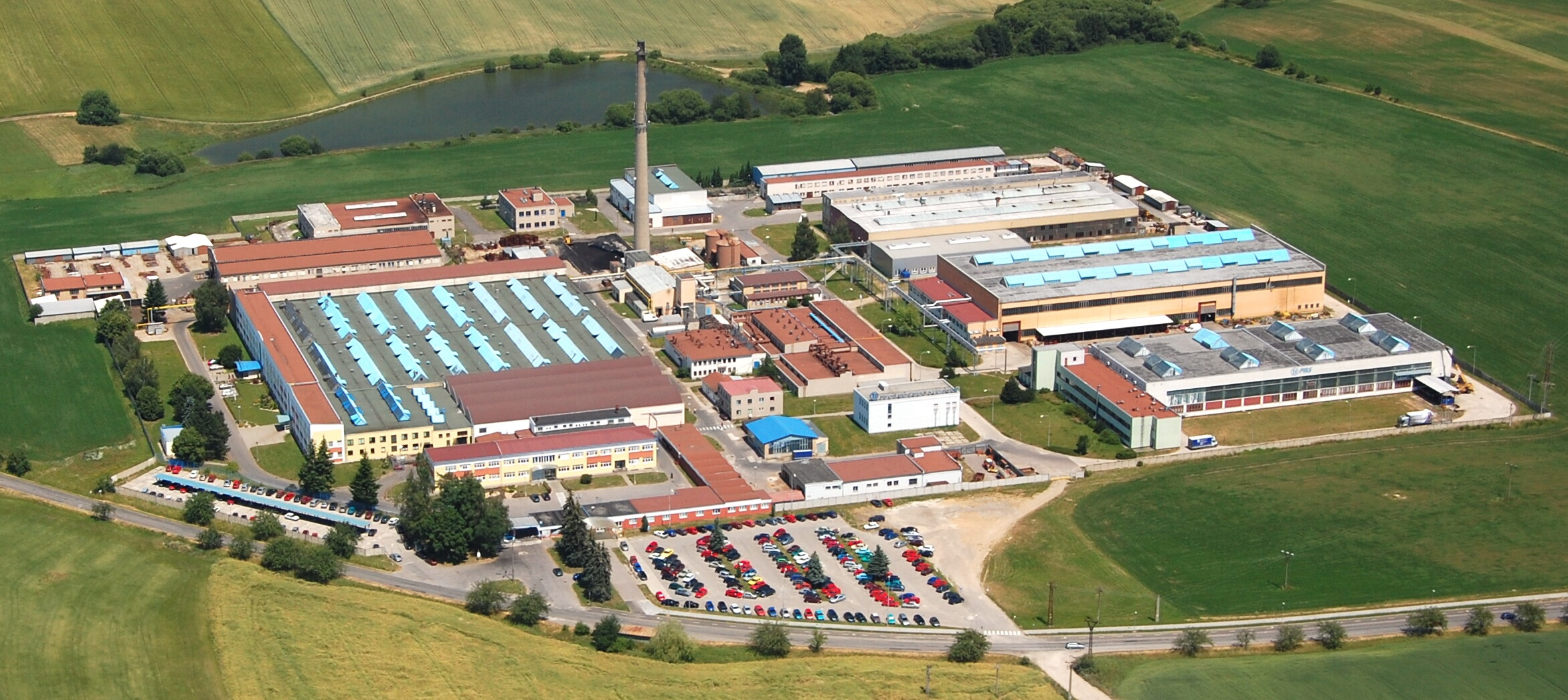
První Brněnská Strojírna Velká Bíteš

The largest employers based in the town are ITW Pronovia, manufacturer of plastic products for the automotive industry, and První Brněnská Strojírna Velká Bíteš, manufacturer of aerospace technologies.

== Transport ==
The D1 motorway from Prague to Brno runs next to the town.

== Sights ==
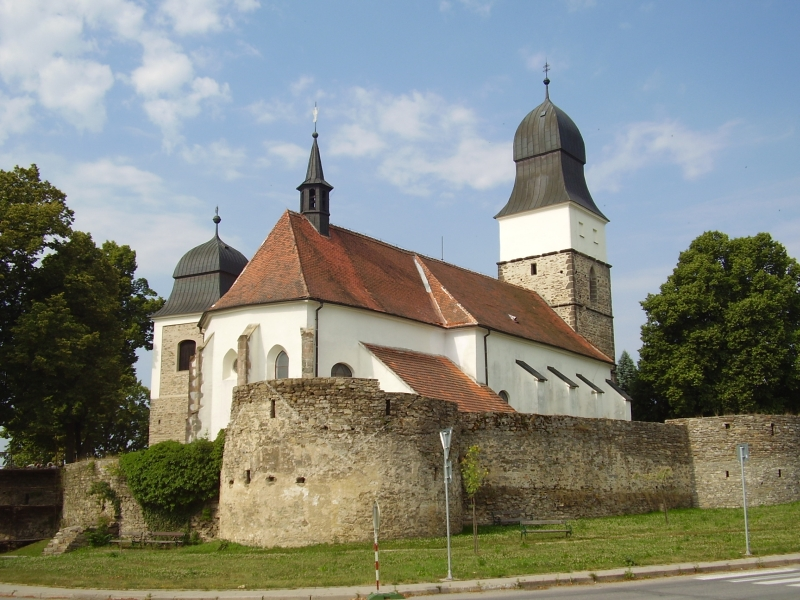
Church of Saint John the Baptist

Velká Bíteš is known for the unique fortified Church of Saint John the Baptist. The original wooden structure was replaced by the stone Romanesque church in the 13th century. In the 15th century, it was surrounded by stone ramparts with an entrance tower.

== Notable people ==
- Martin Roháč (?–1571), serial killer
- Eva Schiroky (1840–1919), anarchist
- Vojtěch Řepa (born 2000), cyclist

== Twin towns – sister cities ==
Velká Bíteš is twinned with:

- Hanušovce nad Topľou, Slovakia
