= Jestřebí hory =

Coordinates: 50.5528°N 16.0514°E

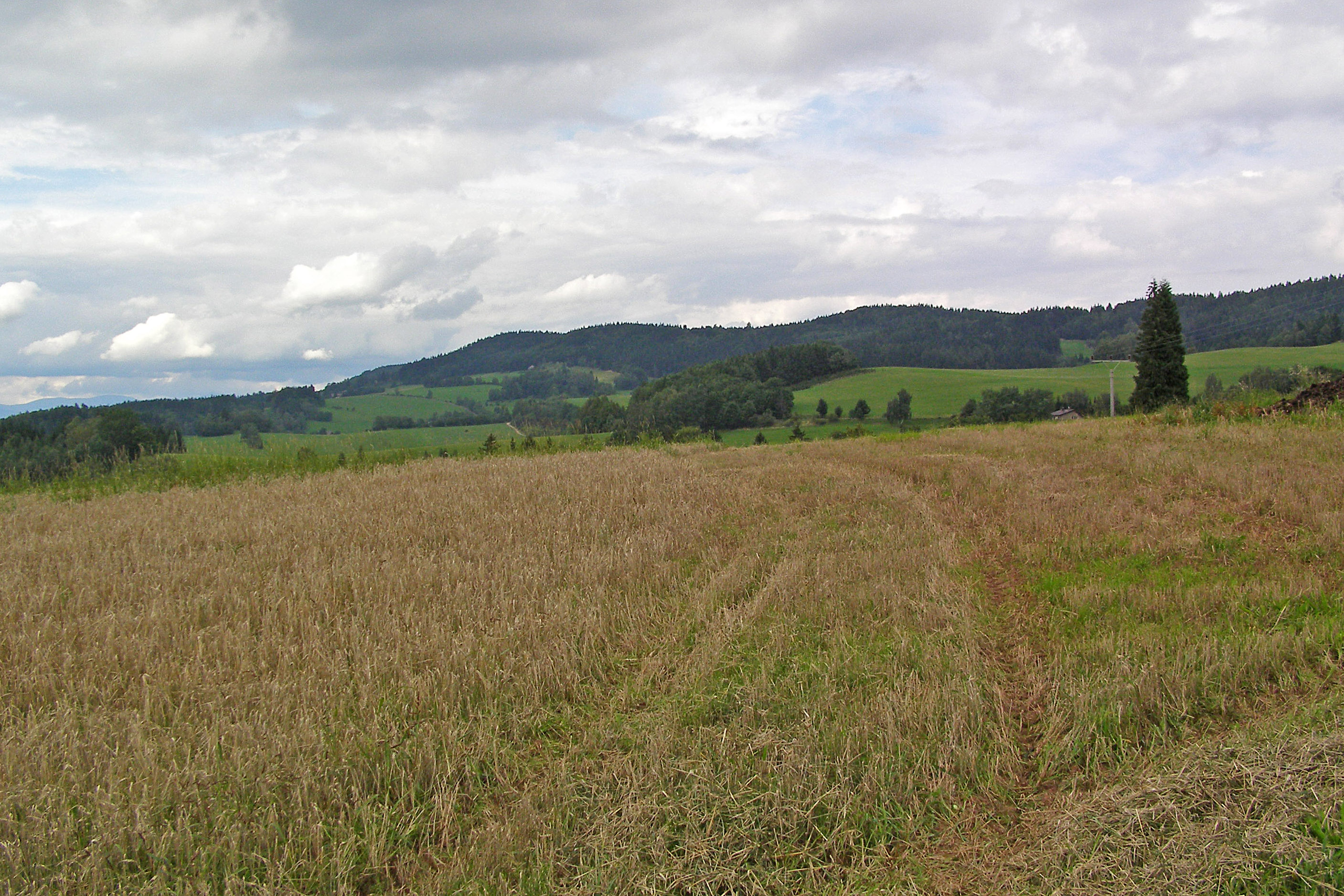
- View of Jestřebí hory from Odolov

Highest point
- Peak: Žaltman
- Elevation: 740 m (2,430 ft)

Geography
- Country: Czech Republic
- Regions: Hradec Králové Region
- Parent range: Broumov Highlands

The Jestřebí hory (English: Hawk Mountains, German: Habichtsgebirge) is a mountain range in the Czech Republic. It is located in the western part of the Broumov Highlands within the Central Sudetes.

== Location ==
Jestřebí hory are located in the Hradec Králové Region of the Czech Republic, south west of Broumov. The mountain range spreads from Krucze Mountains in the north-west to the valley of the river Metuje in the south-east.

In terms of geomorphological division of the Czech Republic, it is a microregion located in the western part of the Broumov Highlands within the Central Sudetes.

== Specification ==
Jestřebí hory is a small mountain range made up of several high peaks which do not surpass 750 metres, located in the riven basin of the river Metuje and Úpa, and their inflows. The mountain range has a length of 20 km and stretches from the north-east to south-west, from the north of the area of Trutnov in the north-west to the outskirts of the settlement of Hronov in the south-east. From the north-west the mountain range borders the Giant Mountains, from the north they border Krucze Mountains, from the north-eastern side they border the Adršpach-Teplice Rocks, from the east they border the Stołowe Mountains, from which they are separated by the Metuje and Jívka rivers, and from the south-east they are by the Podorlicko Uplands.

The region characterises itself by frequent height differences, by steep slopes and valleys of streams with irregular falls. The slopes have sudden ridges and have their terrain steep. The middle part of the mountain range is the highest part with its highest peak Žaltman at 740 metres (2,430 ft). The mountain range in the south-eastern part slowly reduces in height into the valley of Metuje, making them smaller and thinner. The south-eastern part of the mountain range extends with its high peak Vrše with a height of 518 metres (1,699 ft).

== Waters ==
The mountain range belongs to the conglomeration of the North Sea. The drainage is by Metuje, Jívka and Markušovický stream.
