= Placide Schouppe =

Belgian mechanic, burglar and illegalist anarchist

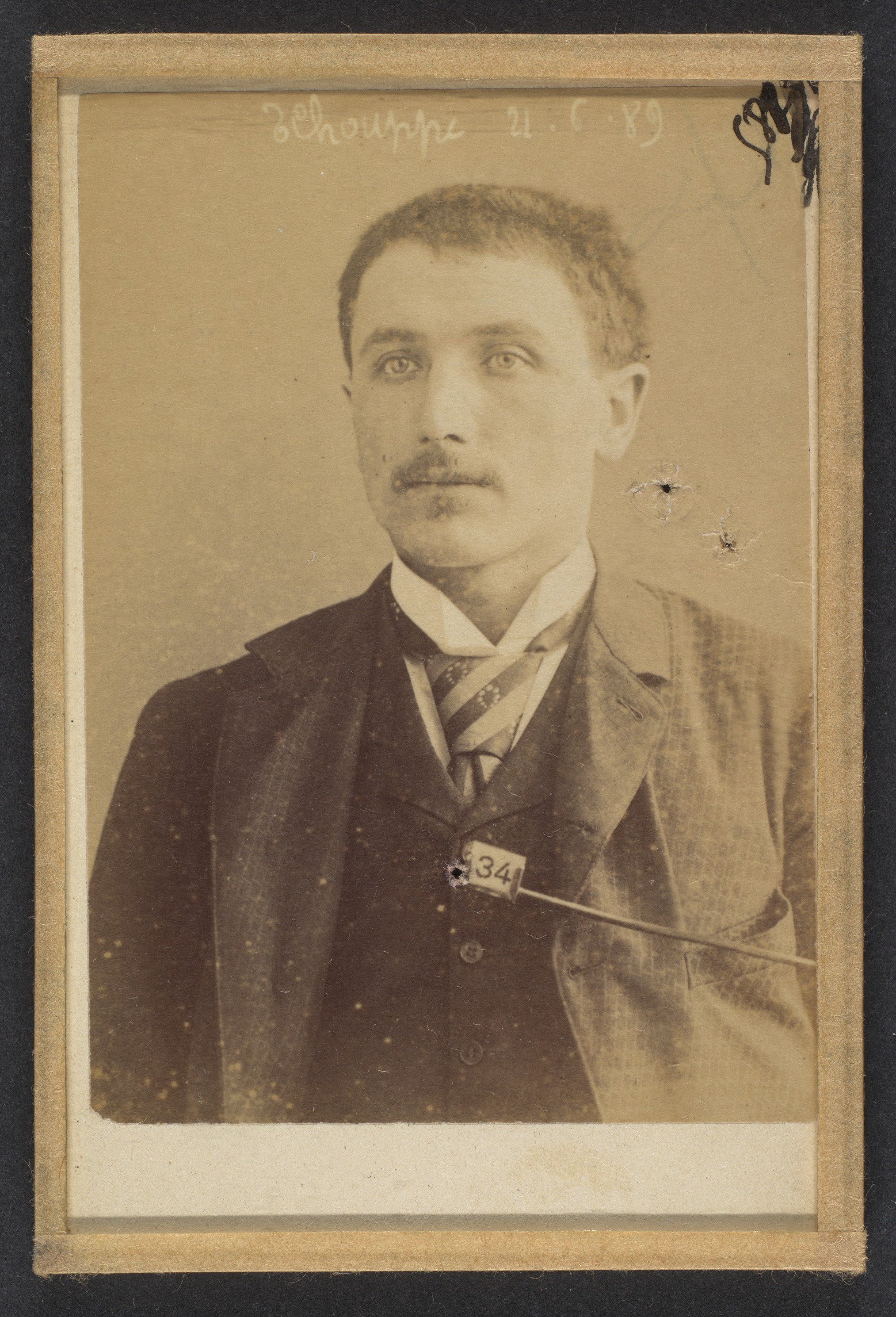
- Placide Schouppe's mugshot taken by Alphonse Bertillon in 1889
- Born: March 12, 1858; Dikkelvenne, Belgium
- Died: January 20, 1913 (aged 54); Mons, Belgium
- Citizenship: Belgium
- Occupations: mechanic anarchist
- Known for: Being one of the first illegalists
- Movement: Anarchism
- Spouse: Élise Pelgrom

Placide Schouppe, born on 12 March 1858 in Dikkelvenne, Belgium, and dead in Mons on 20 January 1913, was a Belgian mechanic, burglar, and illegalist anarchist. He is mainly known for his central role in the birth and development of illegalism, founding one of the first illegalist groups, the Schouppe gang. Schouppe was also very close to Vittorio Pini, another one of the main founders of this tendency of anarchism and of the Intransigents of London and Paris group, with whom he escaped from the penal colony of Cayenne. Moreover, Schouppe was the main suspect for the 1888-1889 anarchist bombing campaign, although his culpability was never proven.

After deserting the Belgian army and arriving in France, Schouppe joined the anarchist movement in France. He and his wife, Élise Pelgrom, along with some of his brothers, became involved in the early illegalist groups. He met Pini, and the two committed around ten burglaries together before their arrest in 1889. They were deported to the penal colony together and escaped two years later. Although Pini was caught by the authorities, Schouppe managed to return to Europe, where he resumed his burglaries. The anarchist was arrested multiple times and imprisoned for five years in Belgium. Upon his release on 1897, he became involved in new burglaries, was arrested in France, and sentenced to fifteen years in the penal colony – Schouppe escaped once again in 1905. He was arrested by the Belgian authorities in 1908 and likely deported to the penal colony again. He died in 1913 in Belgium.

His police mugshot is part of the Metropolitan Museum of Art (MET) collections and dates from 1889, making it one of Alphonse Bertillon's earliest and one of the first in history.

== Biography ==
=== Birth and youth ===
Placide Schouppe was born on 12 March 1858 in Dikkelvenne, Belgium. Schouppe deserted the Belgian army in 1880, worked as a mechanic, and moved to France and Paris. He married Élise Pelgrom in Paris on 4 July 1882. The couple had two children: Julienne Schouppe (born 1881, legitimized by her parents after their marriage) and Edmond Schouppe (born 1883).

=== Anarchism and illegalist militancy ===
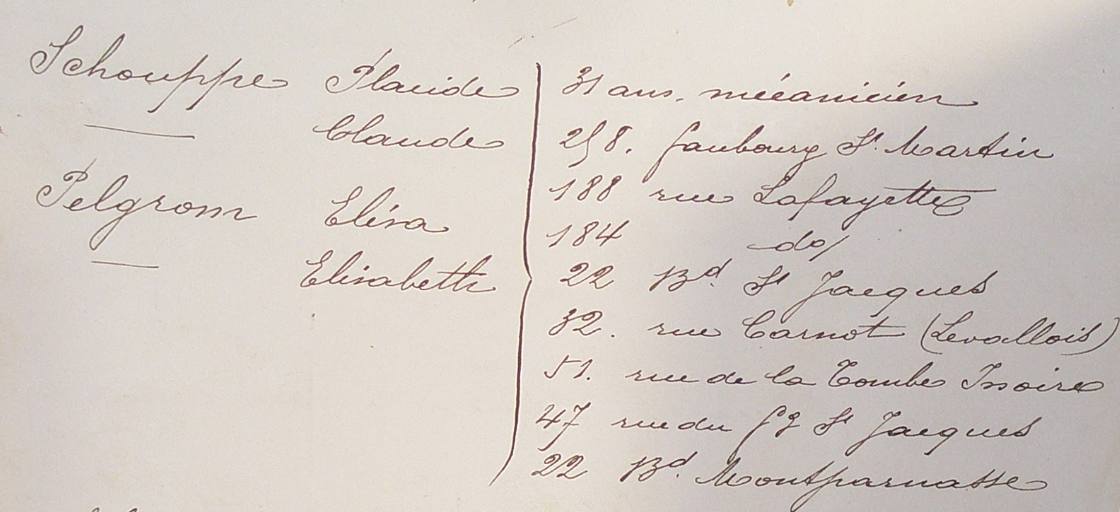
French authorities recensing the addresses of the Schouppes and the Pelgroms (courtesy of Archives anarchistes)

In the 1880s, he began associating with a relatively large number of anarchist and figures of the then emerging anarchist tendency of illegalism. The militant grew closer to the Intransigents of London and Paris, one of the first illegalist groups. Along with his wife, Élise Pelgrom, and some of his brothers, he joined these illegalist circles and became a proponent of individual reclamation—the idea that since the bourgeoisie would steal from the people, it was legitimate to steal back from them. He then founded his own group of cosmopolitan anarchist thieves: the Schouppe gang.

He met the founder of the Intransigeants, Vittorio Pini, and became close to him; the two subsequently collaborated on about ten thefts. According to Vivien Bouhey, these were likely burglaries undertaken with significant professionalism by Pini and Schouppe. After burglarizing, the group fenced the stolen goods in London through Alessandro Marocco and possibly even Errico Malatesta. He was also connected with Léon Ortiz and Paolo Chiericotti, two illegalists soon to be convicted in the Trial of the Thirty and members of the Ortiz gang—Émile Henry also frequented these circles. The group used a portion of the funds from the thefts to finance a clandestine anarchist printing press in premises rented by Schouppe, with Pini serving as the primary proofreader for the press.

In 1889, when Pini was arrested following a police raid, a French anarchist named Fabre, arrested at his home, denounced four accomplices in the Intransigents' thefts before dying in police custody. Among the names he provided were Schouppe's, and he was arrested. During the raid of his home, he was suspected of being one of the perpetrators of the anarchist bombing campaign of 1888-1889, though this led to no further action.

He defended himself during his trial on 6 November 1889. He was sentenced to ten years of deportation to the penal colony and ten years of banishment from the territory.

=== Escape stories ===
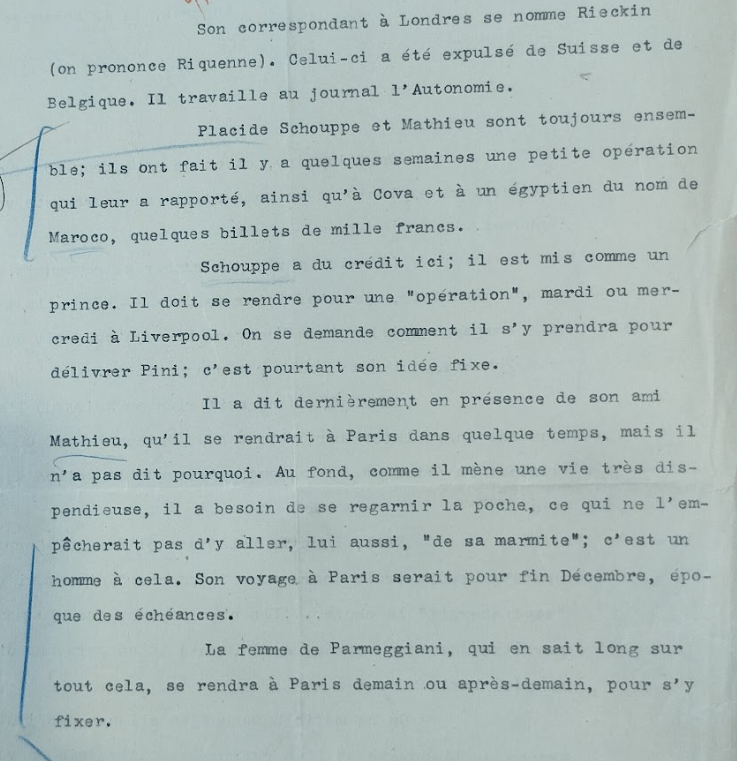
French police report on Schouppe characterizing him as a great 'friend' of Gustave Mathieu (courtesy of Archives anarchistes)

The anarchist was deported to Cayenne with Pini, and managed to escape with him and another convict in 1891 by canoe. Two versions of the subsequent events were reported in the press at the time: the first claims that Schouppe and Pini were surprised by one or more jaguars, which killed the other convict and injured Schouppe's arm. They supposedly managed to get hired on a plantation for some time, but Pini was no longer able to walk due to swollen feet and was arrested by the Dutch police, who extradited him. Schouppe, meanwhile, reportedly continued on to Venezuela, Mexico, and then returned to the United Kingdom and France. He then allegedly tried to raise funds to help Pini escape.

In the other version, he supposedly left Pini alone at the plantation to find clothes other than the prison uniforms they were wearing. Meanwhile, Pini was surprised by Dutch gendarmes, who shot and wounded him as he tried to escape. With gangrene setting into his thigh wound, he was recaptured and extradited. Schouppe, seeing his companion captured, allegedly took a boat to Mexico, but it shipwrecked, and half the passengers drowned. Stranded on a small island with a Spaniard, who later died while they waited for rescue, he was eventually rescued by a British ship that took him back to the United Kingdom.

Clément Duval offers a different account, claiming that Pini and Schouppe arrived at this plantation where other escapees were counterfeiting money. Local merchants, unhappy with this situation, sent the police to the plantation—known for employing many escapees—and shot Pini as he tried to flee.

=== Return to Europe, resumption of thefts, imprisonment ===
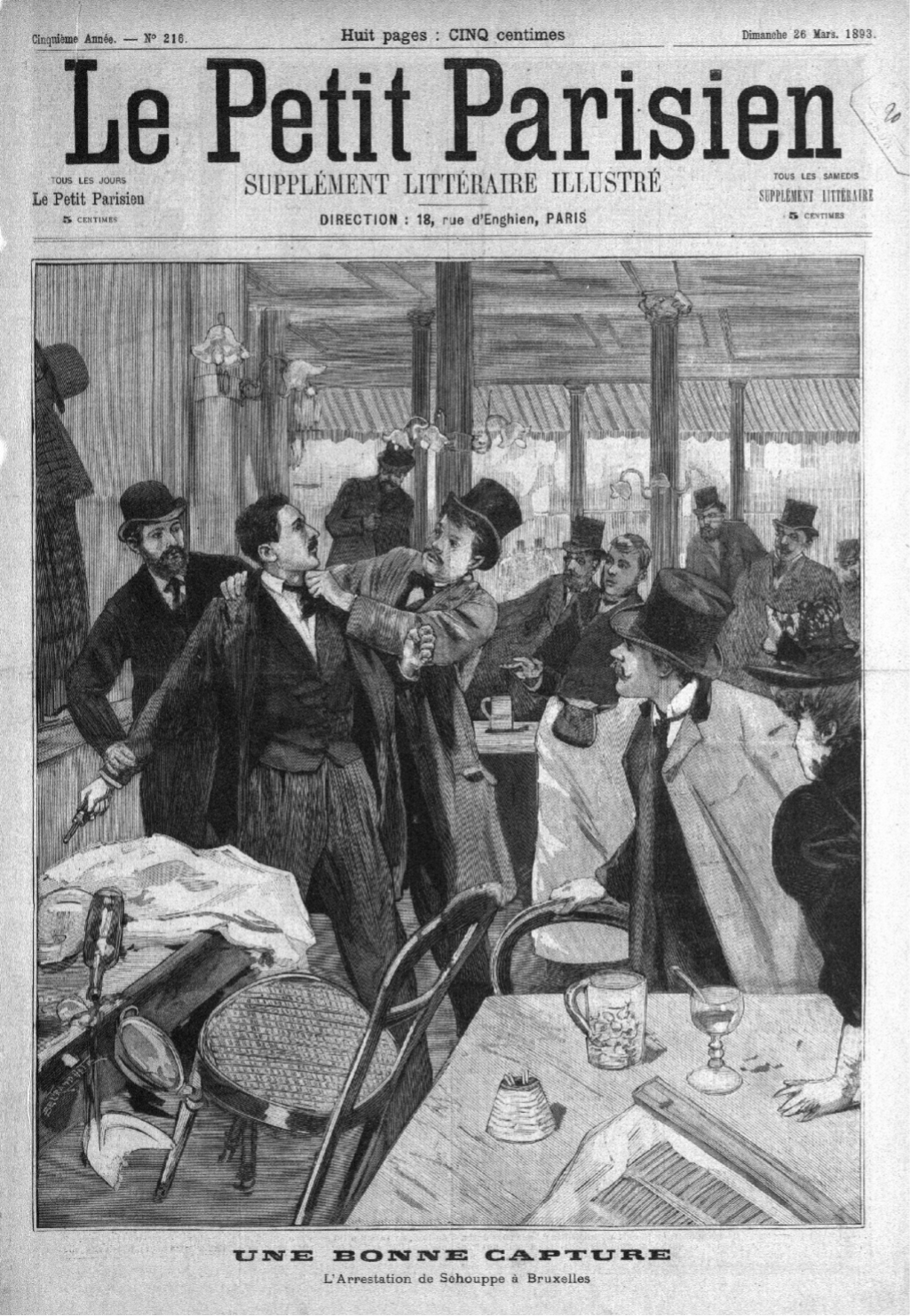
Schouppe's arrest in front page of Le Petit Parisien (26 March 1893)

In 1892, he was harbored by Léon Ortiz. The following year, having just dyed his hair and beard to avoid recognition with an anarchist barber who practiced such identity concealment, he was arrested on 14 March 1893 in a bar in Brussels—at the same time as his brother, Rémy 'Revolver' Schouppe. At his brother's place, Belgian authorities found tools for burglaries and the proceeds from a number of them. He was sentenced to two years in prison for deserting over ten years earlier.

Later that same year, he was sentenced to five years in prison for "affiliation with criminal organizations, carrying false names, and manufacturing false keys". Two years later, on 23 April 1895, he received a ten-year prison sentence for theft, a sentence that was ultimately overturned on appeal.

He was released after serving his sentence on 30 November 1897.

=== Second escape, later years ===
The French police arrested him in Montmartre less than a month later, intending to send him back to the penal colony. His lawyer managed to negotiate his expulsion from the country instead, and French authorities deported him to the United Kingdom. He was arrested two months later, in April 1898, while planning the robbery of a Brussels hotel.

In 1900, he was arrested in Nancy for associating with other anarchists and committing a robbery of 120,000 francs. He was sentenced to fifteen years of deportation to the penal colony and perpetual relegation to French Guiana after his sentence. Schouppe managed to escape again in 1905 and reached the Netherlands, where authorities expelled him. Returning to Belgium, he was arrested and extradited to France, who likely sent him back to the penal colony.

In 1911, after the death of Élise Pelgrom the previous year, Schouppe remarried Maria Hyacinthe Leplat in Mons. Three years later, when his son Edmond Joseph Schouppe married Jeanne Laure Francon in the eighteenth arrondissement of Paris, he was indicated as deceased on their act.

== Legacy ==
=== Police mugshot ===
His police mugshot is part of the Metropolitan Museum of Art (MET) collections and dates from 1889, making it one of Alphonse Bertillon's earliest and one of the first in history.

== Bibliography ==
- Bouhey, Vivien (2008), Les Anarchistes contre la République [The Anarchists against the Republic] (in French), Rennes: Presses universitaires de Rennes (PUR)
- Duval, Clément; Galleani, Luigi (1929), Memorie autobiografiche (in Italian), Newark: Biblioteca de L'Adunata dei refrattari, OCLC 2314088
- Petit, Dominique (2024), SCHOUPPE Placide, Paris: Le Maitron
- Petit, Dominique; Samzun, Patrick (2025), "SCHOUPPE, Placide", Dictionnaire international des militants anarchistes, Paris
