= Jestřabí Lhota =

- Municipality
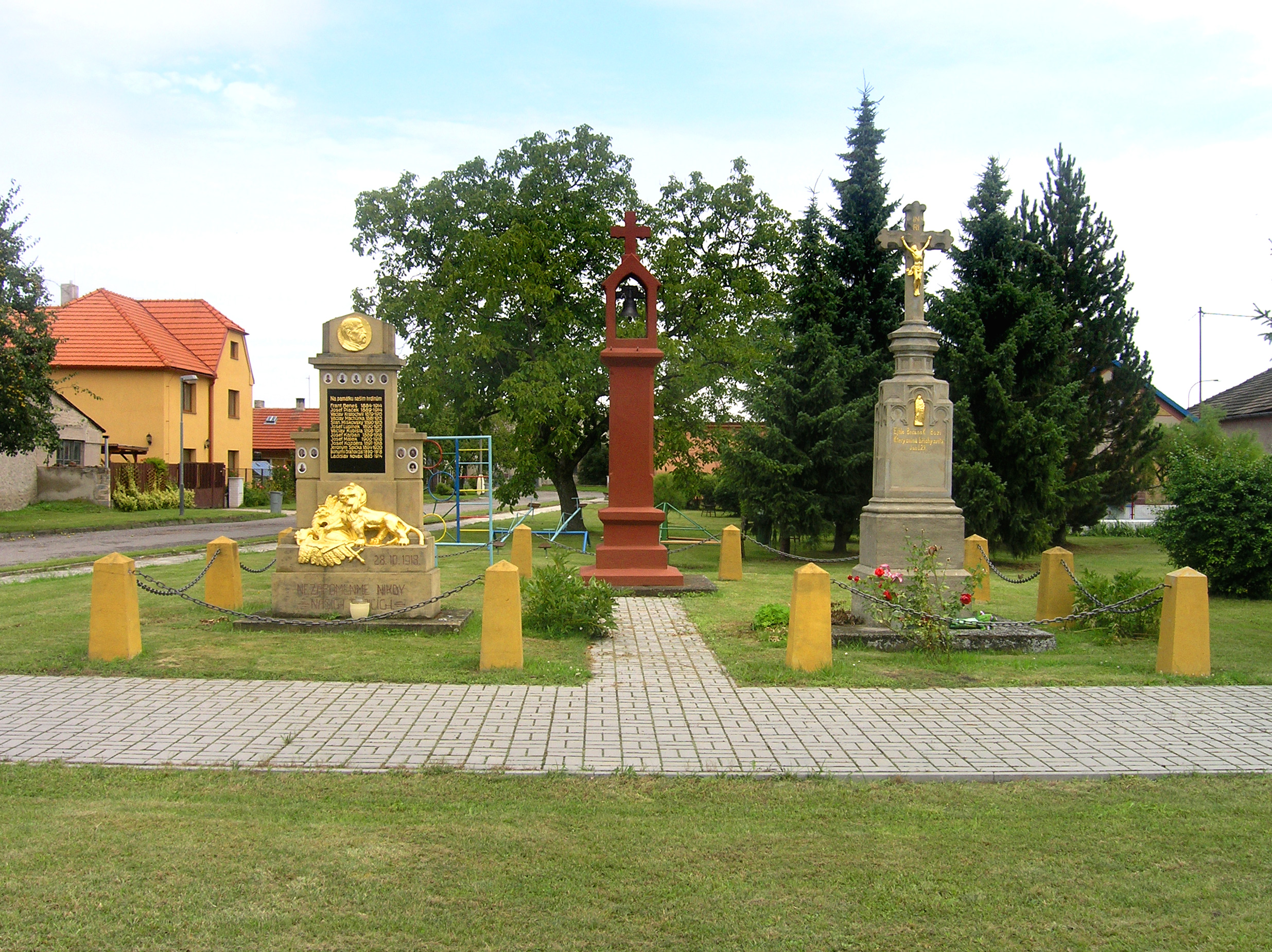
- Memorial of the Fallen

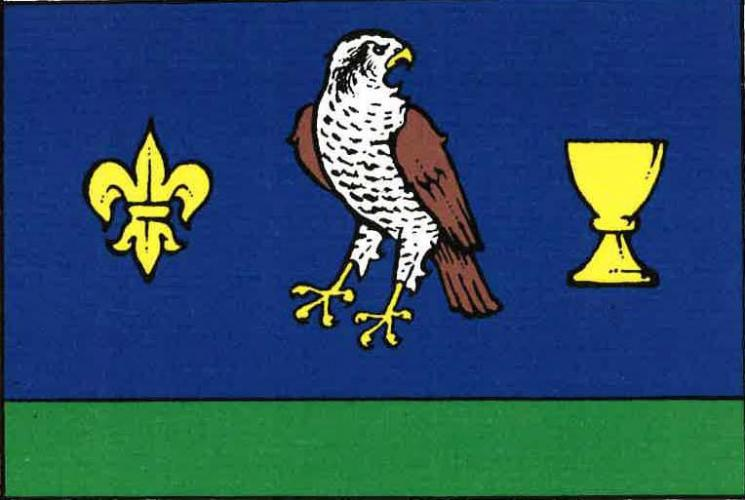
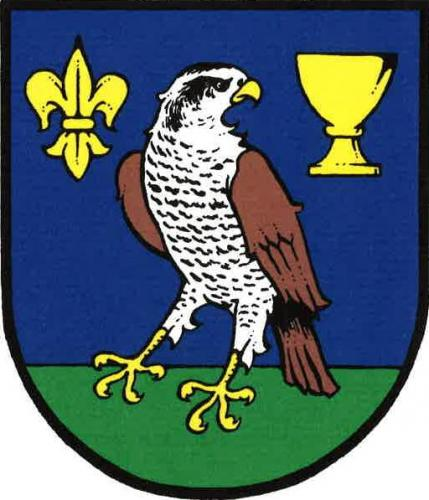
- Flag Coat of arms

- Location in the Czech Republic
- Coordinates: 50°5′24″N 15°15′42″E
- Country: Czech Republic
- Region: Central Bohemian
- District: Kolín
- First mentioned: 1273

Area
  - Total: 5.48 km^{2} (2.12 sq mi)
- Elevation: 211 m (692 ft)

Population (2026-01-01)
  - Total: 552
  - Density: 101/km^{2} (261/sq mi)
- Time zone: UTC+1 (CET)
  - Summer (DST): UTC+2 (CEST)
- Postal code: 280 02
- Website: www.jestrabi-lhota.cz

Jestřabí Lhota is a municipality and village in Kolín District in the Central Bohemian Region of the Czech Republic. It has about 600 inhabitants.

== Demographics ==
Historical population
Year	Pop.	±%
1869	475	—
1880	492	+3.6%
1890	491	−0.2%
1900	502	+2.2%
1910	543	+8.2%
1921	568	+4.6%
1930	494	−13.0%
1950	460	−6.9%
1961	442	−3.9%
1970	394	−10.9%
1980	363	−7.9%
1991	350	−3.6%
2001	366	+4.6%
2011	441	+20.5%
2021	539	+22.2%
Source: Censuses
