= Jestřabí (Zlín District) =

- Municipality
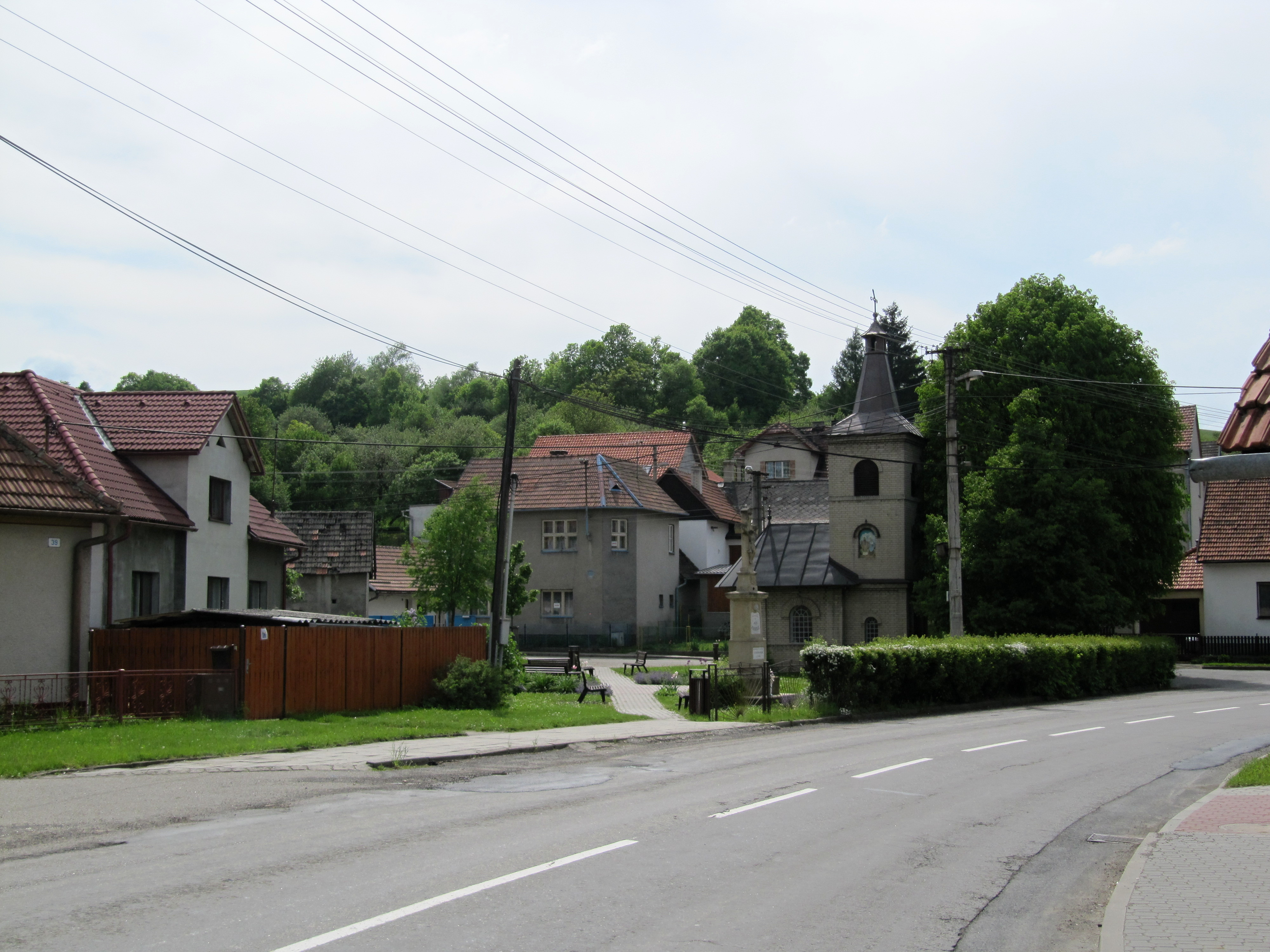
- Centre of Jestřabí

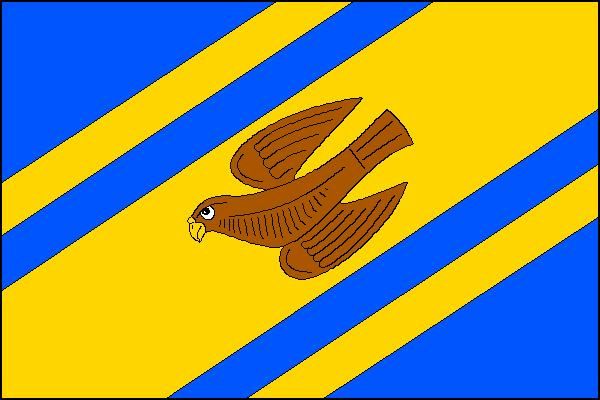
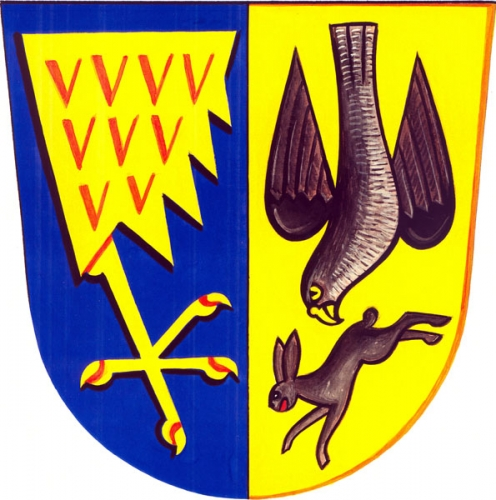
- Flag Coat of arms

- Location in the Czech Republic
- Coordinates: 49°4′5″N 17°57′21″E
- Country: Czech Republic
- Region: Zlín
- District: Zlín
- First mentioned: 1503

Area
  - Total: 3.89 km^{2} (1.50 sq mi)
- Elevation: 336 m (1,102 ft)

Population (2026-01-01)
  - Total: 272
  - Density: 69.9/km^{2} (181/sq mi)
- Time zone: UTC+1 (CET)
  - Summer (DST): UTC+2 (CEST)
- Postal code: 763 33
- Website: obecjestrabi.cz

Jestřabí is a municipality and village in Zlín District in the Zlín Region of the Czech Republic. It has about 300 inhabitants.

Jestřabí lies approximately 29 kilometres (18 mi) south-east of Zlín and 280 km (170 mi) south-east of Prague.

== Demographics ==
Historical population
Year	Pop.	±%
1869	352	—
1880	415	+17.9%
1890	458	+10.4%
1900	455	−0.7%
1910	463	+1.8%
1921	454	−1.9%
1930	473	+4.2%
1950	485	+2.5%
1961	584	+20.4%
1970	400	−31.5%
1980	346	−13.5%
1991	315	−9.0%
2001	319	+1.3%
2011	290	−9.1%
2021	257	−11.4%
Source: Censuses
