= Kuřimské Jestřabí =

Vojkovice
- Municipality
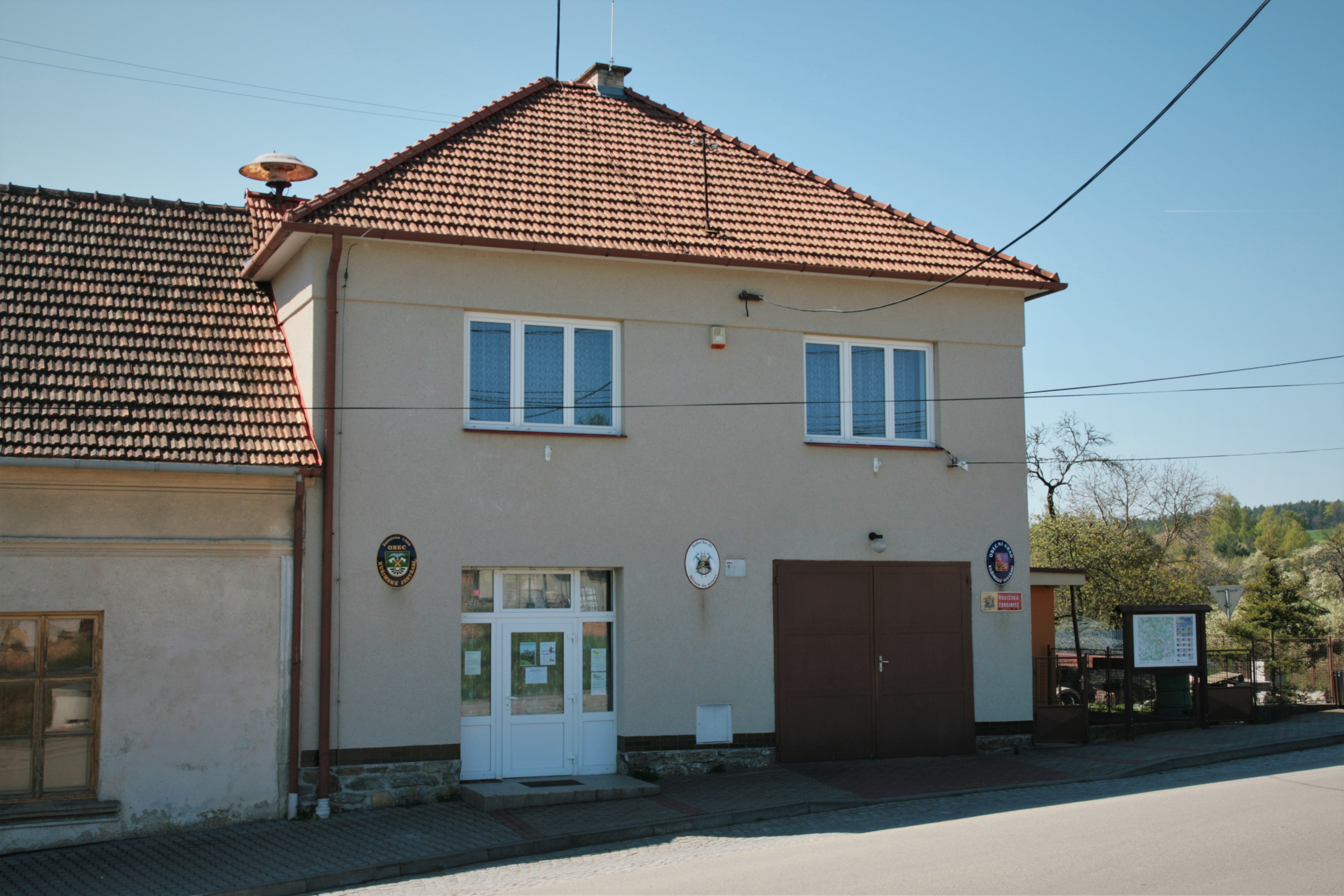
- Municipal office and fire station

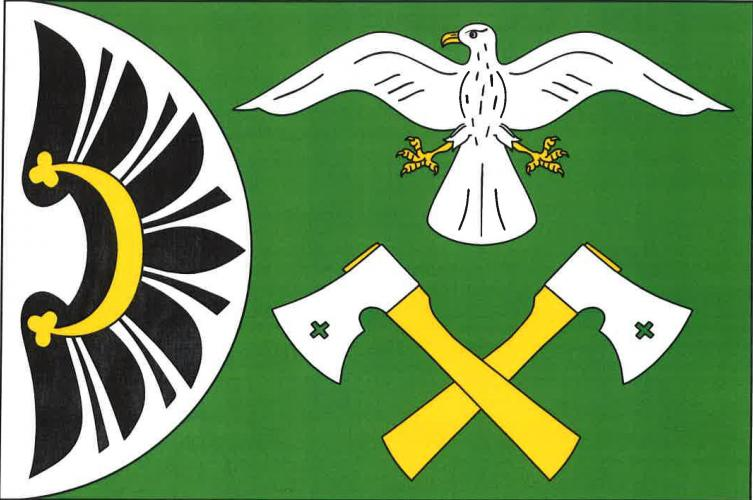
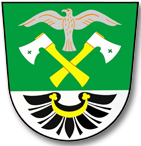
- Flag Coat of arms

- Location in the Czech Republic
- Coordinates: 49°20′48″N 16°18′50″E
- Country: Czech Republic
- Region: South Moravian
- District: Brno-Country
- First mentioned: 1390

Area
  - Total: 5.24 km^{2} (2.02 sq mi)
- Elevation: 434 m (1,424 ft)

Population (2026-01-01)
  - Total: 182
  - Density: 34.7/km^{2} (90.0/sq mi)
- Time zone: UTC+1 (CET)
  - Summer (DST): UTC+2 (CEST)
- Postal code: 594 55
- Website: www.kurimskejestrabi.cz

Kuřimské Jestřabí is a municipality and village in Brno-Country District in the South Moravian Region of the Czech Republic. It has about 200 inhabitants.

Kuřimské Jestřabí lies approximately 27 kilometres (17 mi) north-west of Brno and 160 km (99 mi) south-east of Prague.

== Administrative division ==
Kuřimské Jestřabí consists of two municipal parts (in brackets population according to the 2021 census):

- Kuřimské Jestřabí (179)
- Blahoňov (11)

== Demographics ==
Historical population
Year	Pop.	±%
1869	261	—
1880	297	+13.8%
1890	272	−8.4%
1900	269	−1.1%
1910	278	+3.3%
1921	259	−6.8%
1930	280	+8.1%
1950	231	−17.5%
1961	232	+0.4%
1970	225	−3.0%
1980	180	−20.0%
1991	153	−15.0%
2001	127	−17.0%
2011	149	+17.3%
2021	190	+27.5%
Source: Censuses
