= Mirandola =

- Comune
- Comune di Mirandola
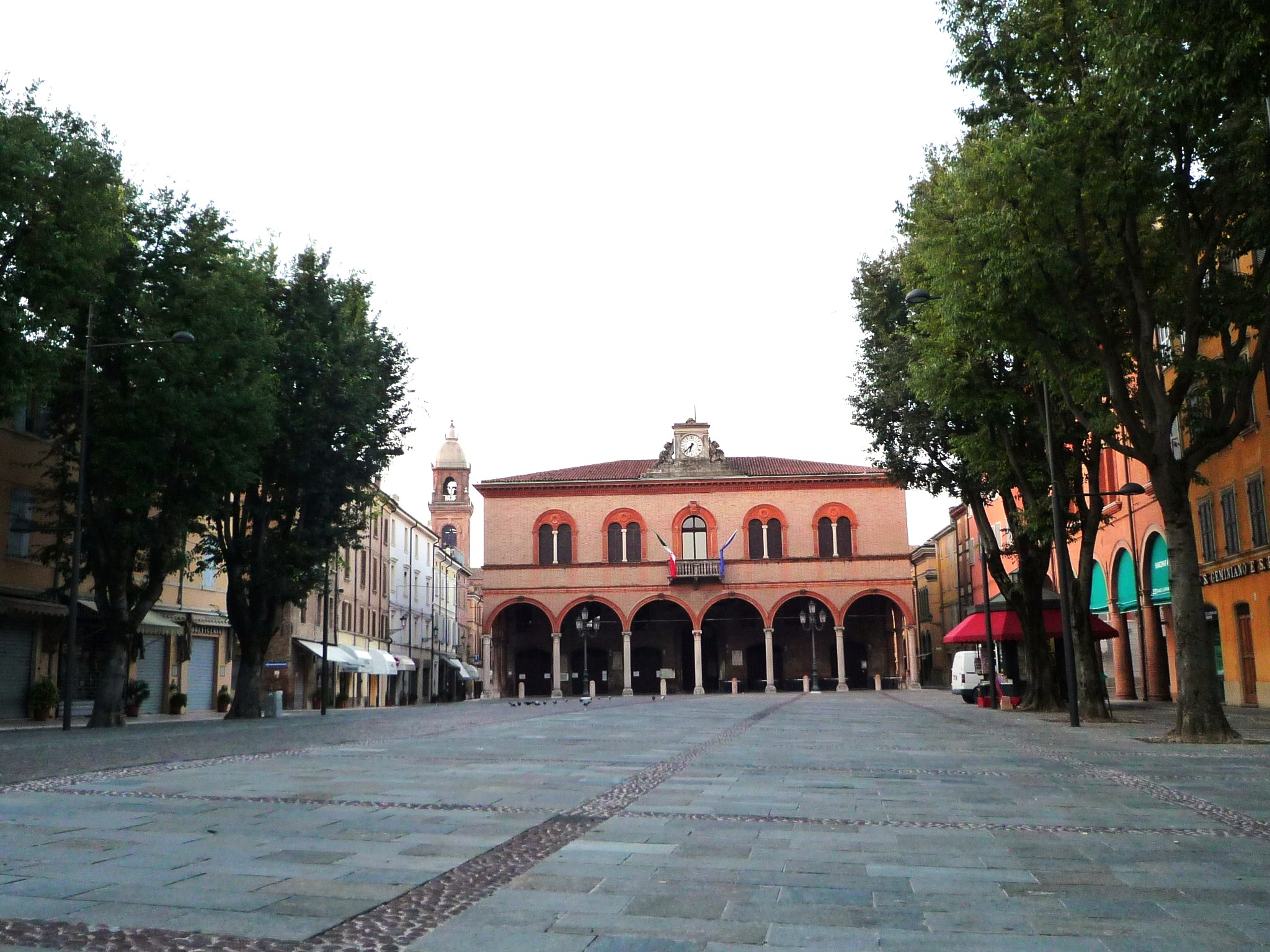

- Flag Coat of arms

- Location within Italy Location within Emilia-Romagna
- Coordinates: 44°53′12″N 11°4′0″E
- Country: Italy
- Region: Emilia-Romagna
- Province: Modena
- Frazioni: Cividale, Gavello, Mortizzuolo, Quarantoli, San Giacomo Roncole, San Martin Carano, San Martino Spino, Tramuschio

Government
  - Mayor: Letizia Budri

Area
  - Total: 137.1 km^{2} (52.9 sq mi)
- Elevation: 18 m (59 ft)

Population (2008)
  - Total: 22,068
  - Density: 161.0/km^{2} (416.9/sq mi)
- Demonym: Mirandolesi
- Time zone: UTC+1 (CET)
  - Summer (DST): UTC+2 (CEST)
- Postal code: 41037
- Dialing code: 0535
- Patron saint: Saint Possidonio
- Saint day: 16 May
- Website: Official website

Mirandola (Mirandolese: La Miràndla) is a city and comune of Emilia-Romagna, Italy, in the Province of Modena, 31 kilometres (19 mi) northeast of the provincial capital by railway.

== History ==
Mirandola originated as a Renaissance city-fortress. For four centuries it was the seat of an independent principality (first a county, then a duchy), a possession of the Pico family, whose most outstanding member was the polymath Giovanni Pico della Mirandola (1463–94). It was besieged two times: in 1510 by Pope Julius II and in 1551 by Pope Julius III.

It was acquired by the Duchy of Modena in 1710. The city started to decay after the castle of Mirandola was partially destroyed in 1714.

On 13 February 1889, former anarchist now a socialist politician, Celso Ceretti, was stabbed by illegalist anarchists from the Intransigents of London and Paris group - Vittorio Pini and Luigi Parmeggiani. He had accused them of being police informants in his newspaper, prompting the attack.

On 29 May 2012, a powerful earthquake hit the Mirandola area. It killed at least 17 people and collapsed churches and factories. Also 200 were injured. The 5.8 magnitude quake left 14,000 people homeless.

== Main sights ==
- The Palazzo del Comune is a 1468 edifice of Gothic style (largely restored in the 19th century), with the portraits of the Pico and other artworks, including an Adoration of the Magi once attributed to Palma il Giovane.
- The castle of the Pico family has been recently restored and it is now open to the public.
- Palazzo della Ragione, in late Gothic style.
- Palazzo Bergomi (15th century)
- The Church of Santa Maria Maggiore (known also as Duomo or Collegiata), dating from the end of the 15th century, has been restored.
- The Church of St. Francis is a fine Gothic church. It houses the tombs of the Pico family, including that of Prendiparte Pico (14th century). Collapsed during the second of the 2012 Emilia earthquakes.
- The Baroque Church of Jesus (1690).
- Teatro Nuovo, opera house and theater built in 1905 and renovated in 2005.
- Stadio Libero Lolli, sport venue

== Notable people ==
- Giovanni Pico della Mirandola, Renaissance nobleman and philosopher
- Nicola Rizzoli, former Serie A referee

== Twin cities ==
- Ostfildern, Germany
- Villejuif, France
