= Mirandola stabbing =

1889 intra-factional anarchist attack in Italy

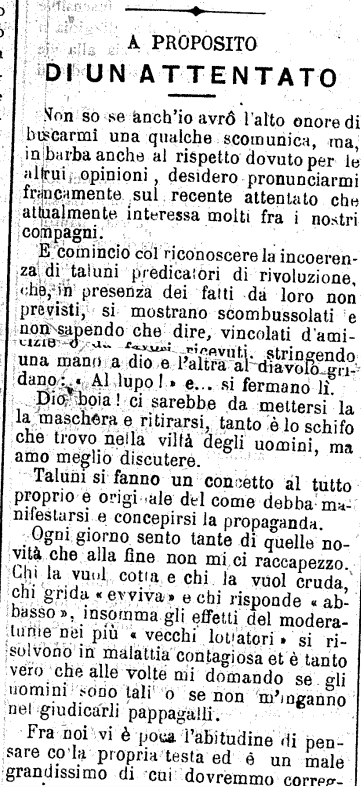
- Reaction and defense of the Mirandola stabbing in Il Pugnale, a newspaper published by the Intransigents and of whom Pini was one of the main editors (April 1889)
- Location: Mirandola, Italy
- Date: 13 February 1889
- Attack type: stabbing
- Deaths: 0
- Injuries: 1
- Perpetrators: Vittorio Pini; Luigi Parmeggiani; Intransigents of London and Paris
- Motive: Anarchism; Revenge after insults by Ceretti

The Mirandola stabbing was a stabbing attack carried out on 13 February 1889 in Mirandola, Emilia-Romagna, Province of Modena, Italy, by the illegalist anarchist militants of the Intransigents of London and Paris, Vittorio Pini and Luigi Parmeggiani. It was an internal attack within the Italian far-left of the period and a 'settling of scores' between anarchists and former anarchists who had become socialist politicians.

The two anarchists targeted the Italian socialist deputy, Celso Ceretti, who had accused them in his newspaper of being provocateurs and police informants in response to their criticism of Amilcare Cipriani, a former anarchist who had also become a socialist politician. Deeply displeased by this statement, the two militants traveled to Italy from Paris and London, went to Mirandola, where Ceretti resided, and stabbed him. He survived his injuries, with Pini claiming at his trial in France for the burglaries of their group that it had been a deliberate choice on their part, as they had refused to assassinate him upon realizing Ceretti had a child at home.

They then fled and headed towards Reggio Emilia, where the socialist deputy Camillo Prampolini, who had also attacked them in his newspaper, was located. The Italian police managed to intercept them on their journey, and the illegalists engaged in a shootout with the Italian officers—they managed to escape, with Pini returning to Paris and Parmeggiani returning to London.

Vittorio Pini was arrested a few months later in Paris along with other members of the Intransigents such as Placide Schouppe, Maria Saenen, and Élise Pelgrom. His trial saw him become one of the first to theorize illegalism.

== History ==
=== Context ===
Anarchism was born and developed in Europe during the 19th century before spreading. Anarchists advocate for the struggle against all forms of domination perceived as unjust, among which is economic domination, with the development of capitalism. They are particularly opposed to the State, seen as the institution that supports and gives birth to many of these dominations through its police, army, and propaganda.

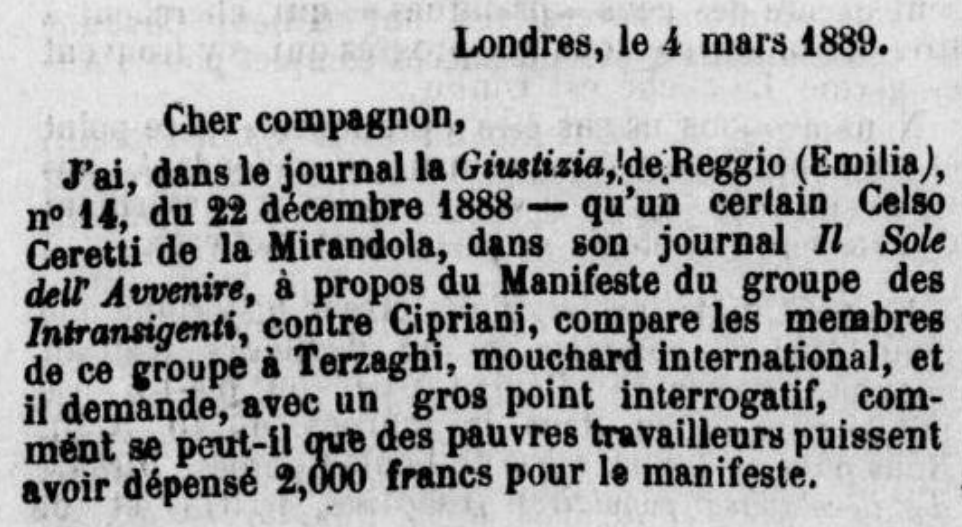
Alessandro Marocco's discussion about the conflicts leading to the attack ; he claims that Ceretti compared the Intransigents to Terzaghi, a famous police informant, Le Révolté (10 March 1889)

However, despite the movement's professed openness, anarchism at the time remained very closed to the social demands of certain classes, such as ex-convicts, and having a criminal record could result in exclusion from the anarchist movement. For example, after Pierre Martinet, an anarchist with a criminal record, attended the trial of one of his companions to defend him and was barred by the prosecutor, who deemed it "unworthy" to allow him to speak as a witness, anarchist groups echoed the prosecutor's accusation and forbade Martinet from speaking on behalf of the anarchist movement. This view was based on the idea that being an ex-convict was immoral and that an anarchist with a criminal record lacked virtue compared to his companions who did not have one.

In this context, a number of militants, particularly Clément Duval and Vittorio Pini, were among the first to theorize and combine anarchist political struggle and theft. This nascent tendency within anarchism, illegalism, was based on the principle of individual reclamation, which they theorized and professed: since capitalists steal from the people, it would be legitimate to steal from them in return. Pini and another Italian anarchist, Luigi Parmeggiani, founded one of the first groups of this tendency, the Intransigents of London and Paris, which was active in Western Europe and based around London and Paris.

They used the profits from their thefts to support a number of anarchist media and propaganda outlets. For instance, Pini was the principal editor of an Italian-language anarchist newspaper in Paris, Il Ciclone—for which he founded a printing press with the profits from the group's thefts. Despite this, he lived in significant poverty.

=== Conflict with Amilcare Cipriani and his socialist allies ===
In one of the group's publications, the Manifesto degl’ anarchici in lingua italiana al popolo d’Italia, Pini and Parmeggiani violently attacked the position held by Amilcare Cipriani—a former anarchist who had become a socialist deputy—in favour of a "union of Latin peoples", which would unite Italians and French, among others. This was a way for Cipriani to fight against Italy's anti-French policy at the time. This position was met with great rejection by the two Italian anarchists, who accused him of holding nationalist views and contrasted the social revolution with the idea of a homeland or fatherland. They suggested that instead of simply seeking a union of "Latin" peoples, Cipriani should instead seek an association of both "Latin" and "Germanic" workers to fight together against capitalism.

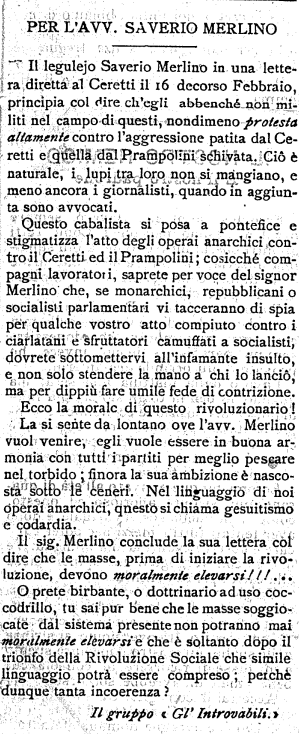
Criticism of the reaction of Saverio Merlino to the Mirandola stabbing in Il Pugnale

Two Italian socialist newspapers, Il sole dell’avvenire, run in Mirandola by the socialist deputy Celso Ceretti, and La Giustizia, published in Reggio by the socialist deputy Camillo Prampolini, responded to these attacks by defending Cipriani and accusing Pini and Parmeggiani of being police informants and provocateurs.

=== Attack ===
These accusations strongly displeased the group members, who decided to travel to Italy to 'settle the score' with the two socialists responsible for the newspapers that had insulted them.

On 13 February 1889, they were in Mirandola, where Ceretti and his newspaper were located. They entered his home, stabbed him, and fled after committing their attack; he survived. Three days later, they were in Reggio Emilia, and prepared to act against Prampolini when they were identified by the Italian police, who sought to arrest them. Pini and Parmeggiani managed to escape after engaging in a gunfight with the police.

=== Return to Western Europe and aftermath ===
Pini returned to France, while Parmeggiani went back to the United Kingdom. Pini was arrested a few months later with other members of the Intransigents such as Placide Schouppe, Maria Saenen, and Élise Pelgrom. Their trial saw Pini become one of the first to publicly theorize illegalism.

During the trial in France, which was about the more than twenty burglaries that the group was accused to have committed, Pini admitted his guilt and stated that he had intended to 'execute' Ceretti, but claimed to have changed his mind after seeing that his target had a child at home. Parmeggiani was reportedly more doubtful about this choice. Pini declared:

When I entered the house of this man whom my comrade and I had condemned to death, I saw that he had a child. So I was overcome with pity and I said to Parmeggiani: 'Let's not kill him'.

'But we are breaking our commitments', Parmeggiani replied. 'Did we not swear to kill him? The anarchist cause demands this victim: we must give it to her.'

These words, reminding me of my oath, made me reflect. We then deliberated, Parmeggiani and I; finally, we agreed to only wound him. That is why I fitted the blade of the dagger I was to use with a washer, one centimeter from the tip, which prevented the weapon from sinking deep. Thus, the blow I struck was not fatal.

== Works related to the Mirandola stabbing ==
- Il Pugnale ('The Dagger'), 2 issues in April and August 1889. In Italian on Wikisource.

== Bibliography ==
- Bouhey, Vivien (2008), Les Anarchistes contre la République [The Anarchists against the Republic] (in French), Rennes: Presses universitaires de Rennes (PUR)
- Diapola, Pietro (2004), Italian anarchists in London (1870-1914) (PhD thesis), London: University of London (GC), p. 278
- Enckell, Marianne (2024), PINI, Vittorio, Paris: Le Maitron
- Jourdain, Edouard (2013). L'anarchisme [Anarchism]. Paris: La Découverte. ISBN 978-2-7071-9091-8.
- S, P (2025), "PINI, Vittorio, Achillo", Dictionnaire international des militants anarchistes, Paris
- Ward, Colin (2004). Anarchism: A Very Short Introduction. Oxford University Press (OUP).
