= Il Pugnale =

Italian-language anarchist newspaper

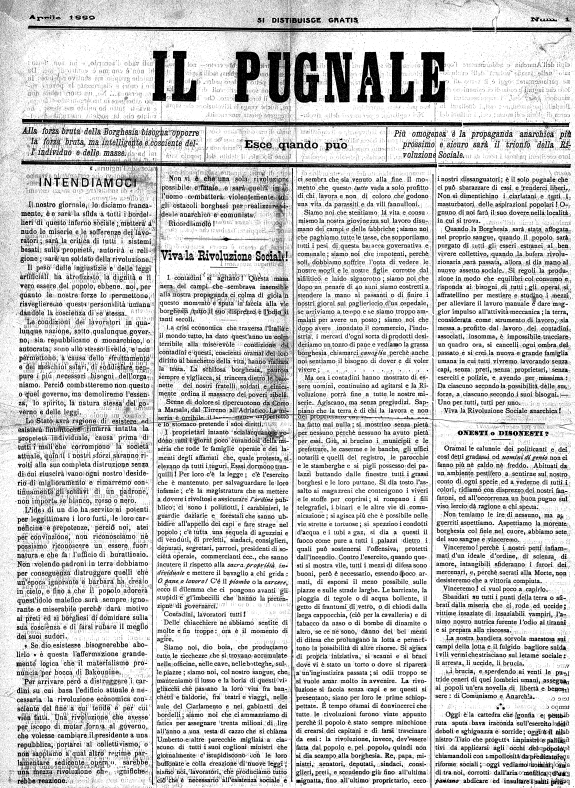
- Front page of the first issue of Il Pugnale (April 1889)
- Founders: Intransigents; Vittorio Pini; Luigi Parmeggiani
- Founded: 1889
- Ceased publication: August 1889
- Political alignment: Anarchism
- Language: Italian
- Headquarters: Paris

Il Pugnale (Italian for 'The Dagger') was an Italian-language anarchist newspaper published in Paris in 1889. This newspaper, released shortly after the Mirandola stabbing by members of the illegalist group the Intransigents of London and Paris, specifically Vittorio Pini or Luigi Parmeggiani, brought together a number of Italian-speaking anarchists, often close to the circles in which the Intransigents operated.

The newspaper, which was distributed for free and financed by the group's burglaries and thefts, was also a strong supporter of propaganda by the deed, for example, giving recipes for making explosives.

== History ==
=== Background ===
Anarchism was developed in Europe during the 19th century before spreading. Anarchists advocate for the struggle against all forms of domination perceived as unjust, among which is economic domination, with the development of capitalism. They are particularly opposed to the State, seen as the institution that supports and gives birth to many of these dominations through its police, army, and propaganda.

However, despite the movement's professed openness, anarchism at the time remained very closed to the social demands of certain classes, such as ex-convicts, and having a criminal record could result in exclusion from the anarchist movement. For example, after Pierre Martinet, an anarchist with a criminal record, attended the trial of one of his companions to defend him and was barred by the prosecutor, who deemed it "unworthy" to allow him to speak as a witness, anarchist groups echoed the prosecutor's accusation and forbade Martinet from speaking on behalf of the anarchist movement. This view was based on the idea that being an ex-convict was immoral and that an anarchist with a criminal record lacked virtue compared to his companions who did not have one.

=== The Intransigents of London and Paris and conflicts ===
Starting in the second half of the 1880s, the idea of individual reclamation—the belief that it was legitimate to steal from capitalists because they would steal from individuals and the people more generally—developed within anarchist circles. A new tendency within anarchism, illegalism, brought together anarchists who wished to organize and fight in this manner.

One of the first groups in this trend, the Intransigents of London and Paris, based in Paris and London and composed of figures like Vittorio Pini, Luigi Parmeggiani, Placide Schouppe, Élise Pelgrom, Maria Saenen, Alessandro Marocco, Paolo Chiericotti, and other illegalists, began a series of burglaries which served, at least in part, to finance activities for spreading anarchist ideas—that is, for political propaganda. The group thus used the proceeds of its thefts to finance a number of anarchist pamphlets, posters, and newspapers. One of these newspapers, the first, was called Il Ciclone.

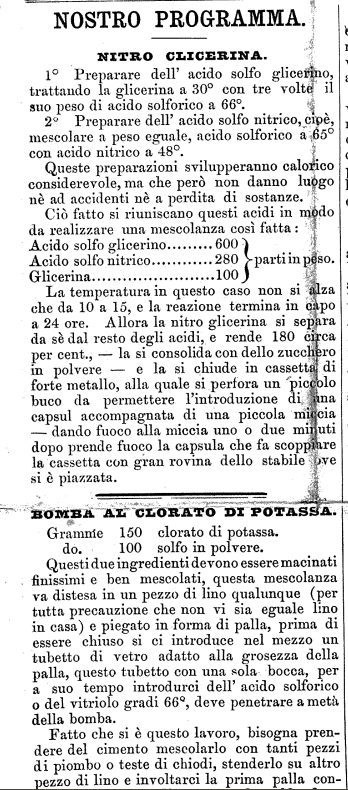
'Our program' followed by explosives manufacturing guides in Il Pugnale (second issue)

In 1888–1889, the Intransigents entered into open conflict with a number of former Italian anarchists who had become socialist deputies or politicians: Amilcare Cipriani, Celso Ceretti, and Camillo Prampolini. In their Manifesto degl'anarchici in lingua italiana al popolo d'Italia, they accused Cipriani of defending nationalist and xenophobic views by seeking an alliance of French-Italian workers that would exclude Germans. They proposed instead that workers from the three countries should unite and seek the social revolution rather than oppose each other in this way based on nationalist sentiments.

This criticism displeased Cipriani, Ceretti, and Prampolini, who used their newspapers to accuse the Intransigents, particularly Pini and Parmeggiani, of being agents provocateurs and police informers. The accusations and insults directed at them drove the two militants to travel to Italy and carry out the Mirandola stabbing, which targeted Ceretti in a knife attack. They were prevented from assassinating Prampolini by the Italian police but managed to flee and return to France and the United Kingdom.

=== Il Pugnale ===
In April 1889, Il Pugnale, meaning 'the Dagger', was published by the group in Paris in Italian. The newspaper was distributed for free and featured two mottos: 'Against the brute force of the Bourgeoisie, we must oppose the brute but intelligent and conscious force of the individual and the masses' and 'The more homogenous the anarchist propaganda, the closer and more certain the triumph of the Social Revolution will be'.

The newspaper consisted of two issues, one from April 1889 and the other from August of the same year, at which time some members of the Intransigents, including Pini, were arrested and faced trial before the French courts. In total, the newspaper included mentions of:

Achille Callidis, [Pietro] Cesare Ceccarelli, Raffaele Ciucci, a shoemaker, Santo Diavo, the group The Untraceables, a group of stabbers, the Intransigent group of Paris, the group of the Intransigents of Paris and London, the anarchist group The Beggars of Alexandria, a rebel, Federico Rava, the editorial board of Humanitas.

The newspaper was also a strong supporter of propaganda by the deed. In the second issue, the first page, under the heading 'Our Program', contained recipes for making explosives like nitroglycerine.

== Works ==
- Il Pugnale ('The Dagger'), 2 issues in April and August 1889. In Italian on Wikisource.

== Bibliography ==
- Bouhey, Vivien (2008). Les Anarchistes contre la République [The Anarchists against the Republic] (in French). Rennes: Presses universitaires de Rennes (PUR).
- Dipaola, Pietro (2004). Italian anarchists in London (1870-1914) (Thesis). London: University of London (GC). p. 278.
- Dipaola, Pietro (2013). Knight errants of Anarchy : London and the Italian Anarchist Diaspora (1880–1917). Liverpool: Studies in Labour History. ISBN 978-1-78138-564-7.
- Jourdain, Edouard (2013). L'anarchisme [Anarchism]. Paris: La Découverte. ISBN 978-2-7071-9091-8.
- S, P (2025). "PINI, Vittorio, Achillo". Dictionnaire international des militants anarchistes. Paris.
- Ward, Colin (2004). Anarchism: A Very Short Introduction. Oxford University Press (OUP).
