= Gustave Mathieu =

French worker and illegalist anarchist

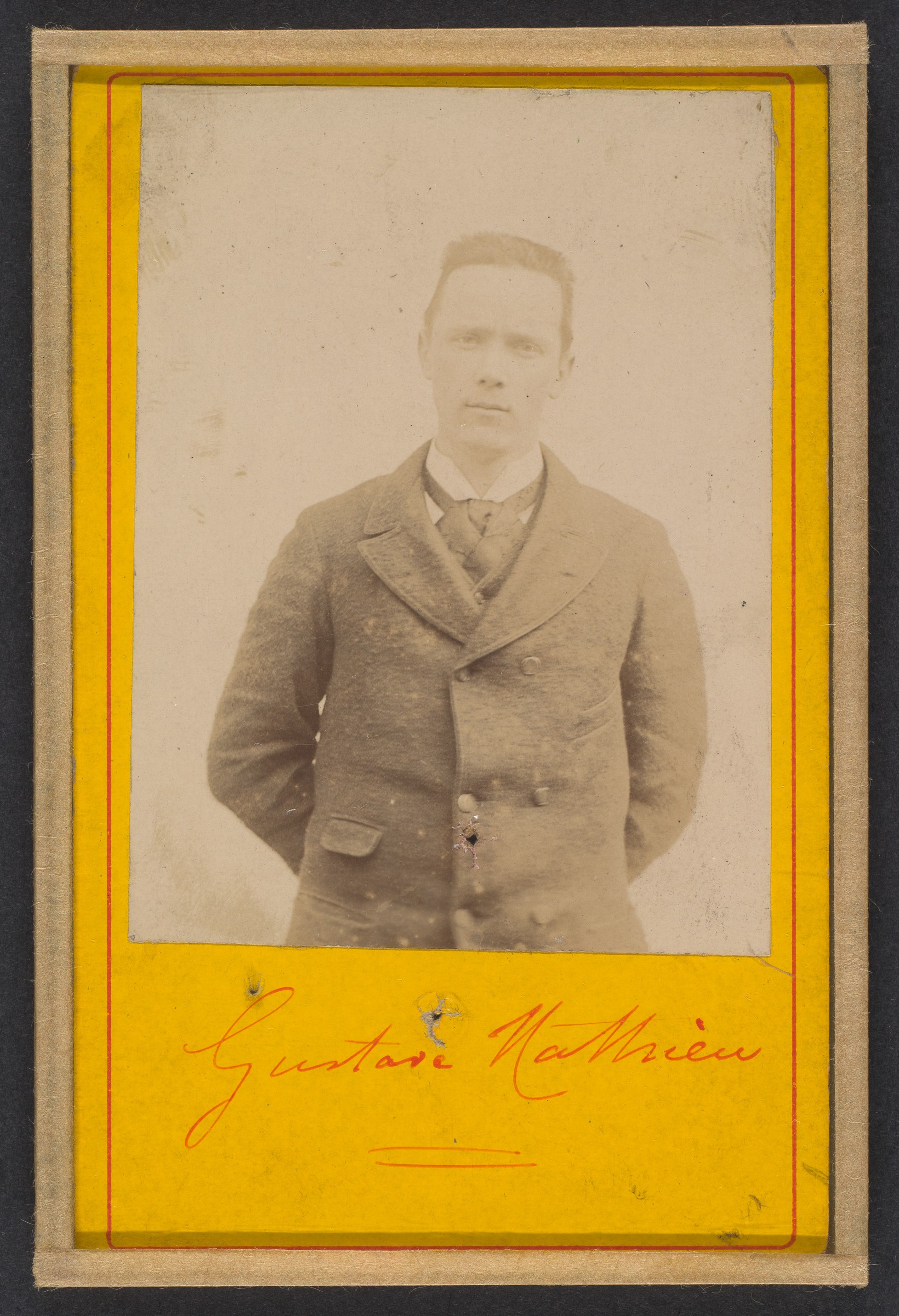
- Gustave Mathieu's mugshot taken by Alphonse Bertillon (Anthropometric File of Anarchists - 1889 ?)
- Born: February 26, 1866; Guise, France
- Died: January 14, 1947 (aged 80); Plaisir, Guise, France
- Citizenship: France
- Occupations: worker, anarchist
- Movement: Anarchism

Gustave Mathieu (26 February 1866 in Guise-14 January 1947, in the same town) was a French worker and illegalist anarchist. A very militant anarchist and central to the birth of illegalism, he notably associated with Placide Schouppe, one of the first illegalists. Mathieu was also one of the most wanted people in France at the start of the Ère des attentats (1892-1894), being accused of being one of Ravachol's main accomplices for the Saint-Germain and the Clichy bombings.

Born into a working-class family in Guise, Aisne, he joined the anarchist movement in France at least from his twenties. He organized various anarchist initiatives in Guise, was arrested, and dragged in chains for 25km during an arrest for putting up anarchist posters. He also began to be suspected of being linked to the Intransigents of London and Paris, a group of anarchists who were then developing the anarchist tendency of illegalism although he seemed actually closer to the Schouppe's gang, a closely linked and similar group.

Following the arrest of some of the Intransigents and Schouppe, Mathieu moved to the northern districts of Paris in the early 1890s—there he met a number of anarchists from the Saint-Denis and Saint-Ouen groups, which supported propaganda by the deed and illegalism. He stood as an anarchist abstentionist candidate in the 1890 legislative elections, and was then tasked, following the Clichy affair—a case of police brutality affecting anarchists—with defending the three victims. The judge's handling of the case, which exonerated the police, caused shockwaves in anarchist circles in France. Mathieu was then possibly involved in a planned bombing that was taking shape, also involving Ravachol and Charles 'Cookie' Simon, one of his close friends with whom he was living at the time. In March 1892, the Saint-Germain bombing followed by the Clichy bombing committed by this group led to France entering the period of the Ère des attentats (1892-1894). Mathieu managed to flee and was heavily searched for by the police, who suspected him of being one of the main perpetrators of the attacks and even of the Véry bombing, but he managed to escape and disappear, eventually obtaining a dismissal of the charges.

After returning to France and being arrested for a theft, he was incarcerated for a year and put on trial for transmitting coded notes containing explosive recipes to other anarchist companions in prison. While his two alleged accomplices were sentenced to heavy penalties, he managed to avoid any conviction. He was then arrested and imprisoned for five years in Belgium for committing a burglary intended to finance an escape attempt for Charles Simon. The latter having been killed by the police during the massacre of the convicts anarchists in 1894, he left Belgium upon his release and returned to France. Mathieu then continued his militant activities and was noted as being responsible for revolutionary groups in Guise until at least the 1910s. During the Interwar period, the anarchist was a diligent reader of revolutionary syndicalist press.

Mathieu died in Guise in 1947.

== Biography ==
=== Youth ===
Gustave Louis Mathieu was born on 26 February 1866, in Guise, in the Aisne department. His father was working there as a laborer at the time.

=== Beginning of anarchist and Illegalist activities ===
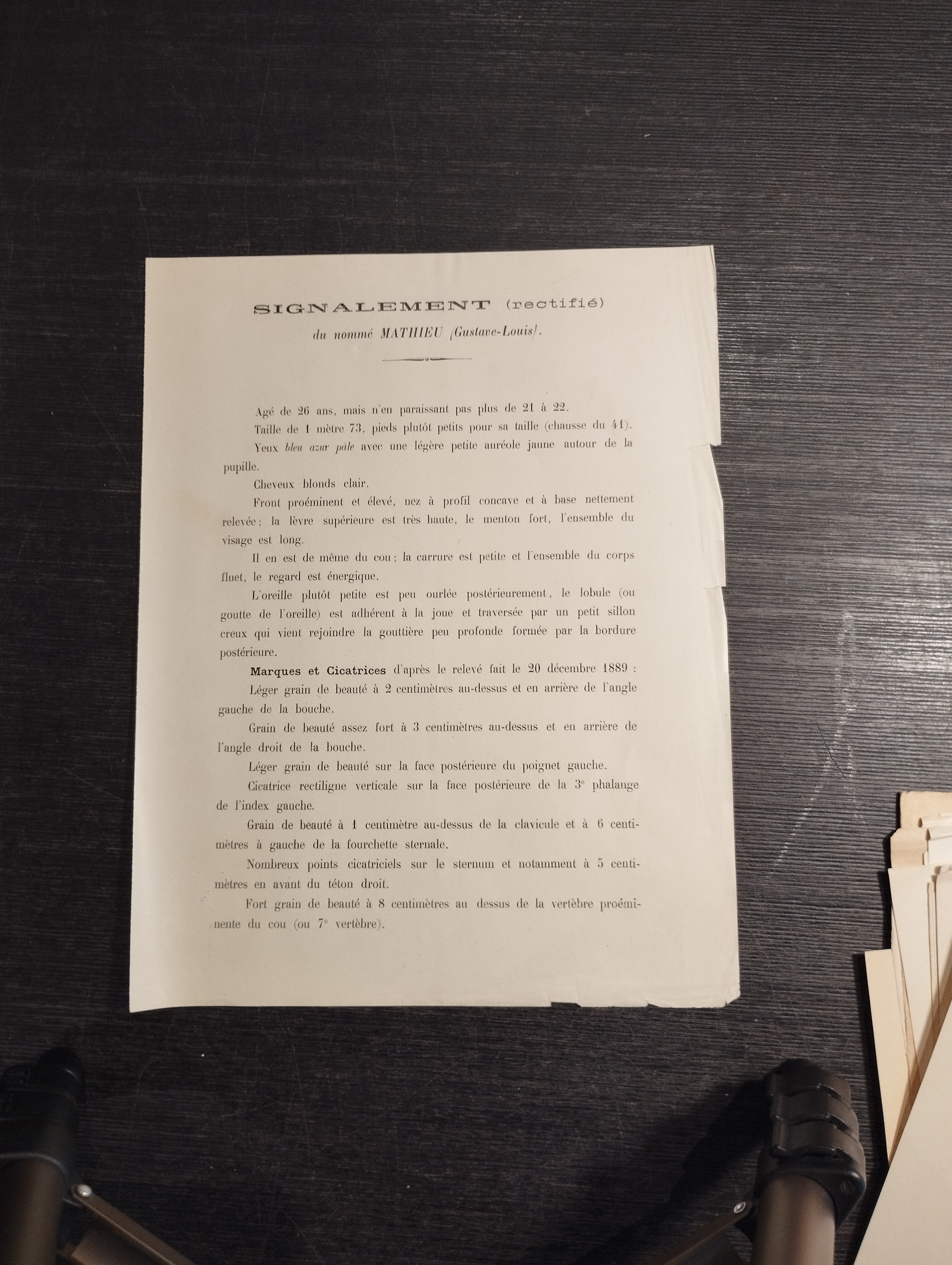
Physical depiction of Gustave Mathieu (courtesy of Archives Anarchistes)

In 1887, when he was in his early twenties, he was noted as having joined the anarchist movement in France and established an abstentionist revolutionary group in Guise, which he led with the companion Louis Basse - who was maybe his cousin. In October of the same year, he was arrested with Basse and Henri Jason following the posting of two placards threatening the director of the Godin factory and its foremen - a posting that followed the dismissal of the companion Alphonse Bal. During this arrest, the three anarchists were chained and led on foot for 25 kilometers to Vervins.

Having been dismissed from his job, he moved to Belgium where he worked as a moulder for a time in Morlanwelz. A refugee with Basse, the two spoke before 300 people at a meeting held in January 1888 in Carnières. Following this meeting, the Belgian authorities demanded that he be found, arrested, and incarcerated at the Petits-Carmes prison with Basse. However, he managed to flee.

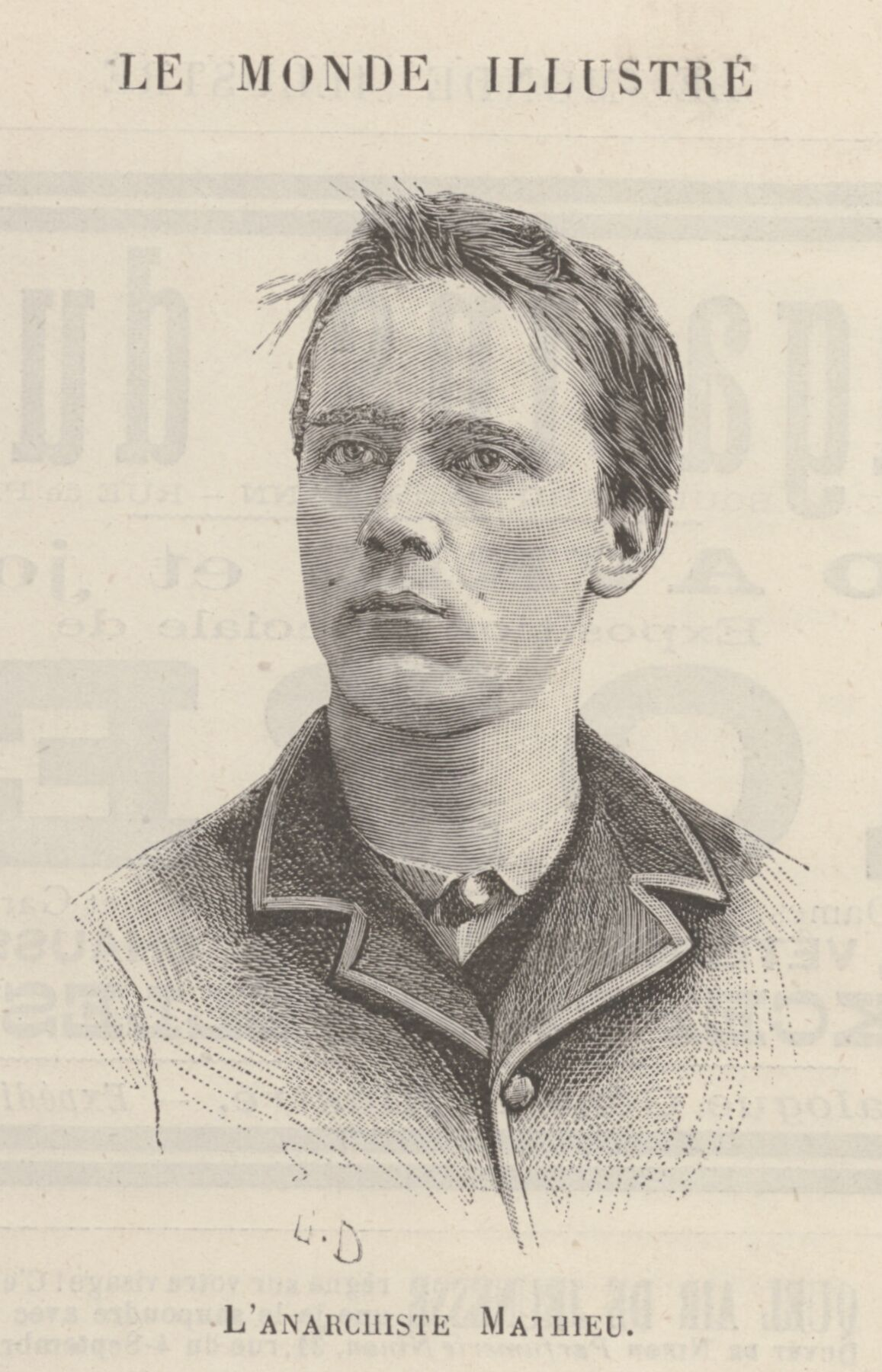
Gustave Mathieu's portrait based on one of his mugshots (Le Monde illustré, 8 April 1893)

In parallel, Mathieu began to be suspected of being a member of the Intransigents of London and Paris, one of the first illegalist groups in history, formed around Vittorio Pini and Alessandro Marocco, Maria Saenen, or Paolo Chiericotti. In reality, Mathieu frequented Placide Schouppe and his family, who were themselves connected to Pini and at the head of their own gang of cosmopolitan anarchist thieves, according to Marie-François Goron. He is said to have assisted the group in its burglary and theft activities. Pini and other members of the group were arrested in 1889, but Mathieu escaped prosecution in this instance.

In 1889, he was sentenced to 24 hours in prison for organizing an undeclared meeting in an inn in Guise. In 1890, in Saint-Quentin, Mathieu was allegedly part of the anarchist group responsible for disturbances at a socialist meeting.

=== Integration within Northern Paris groups ===
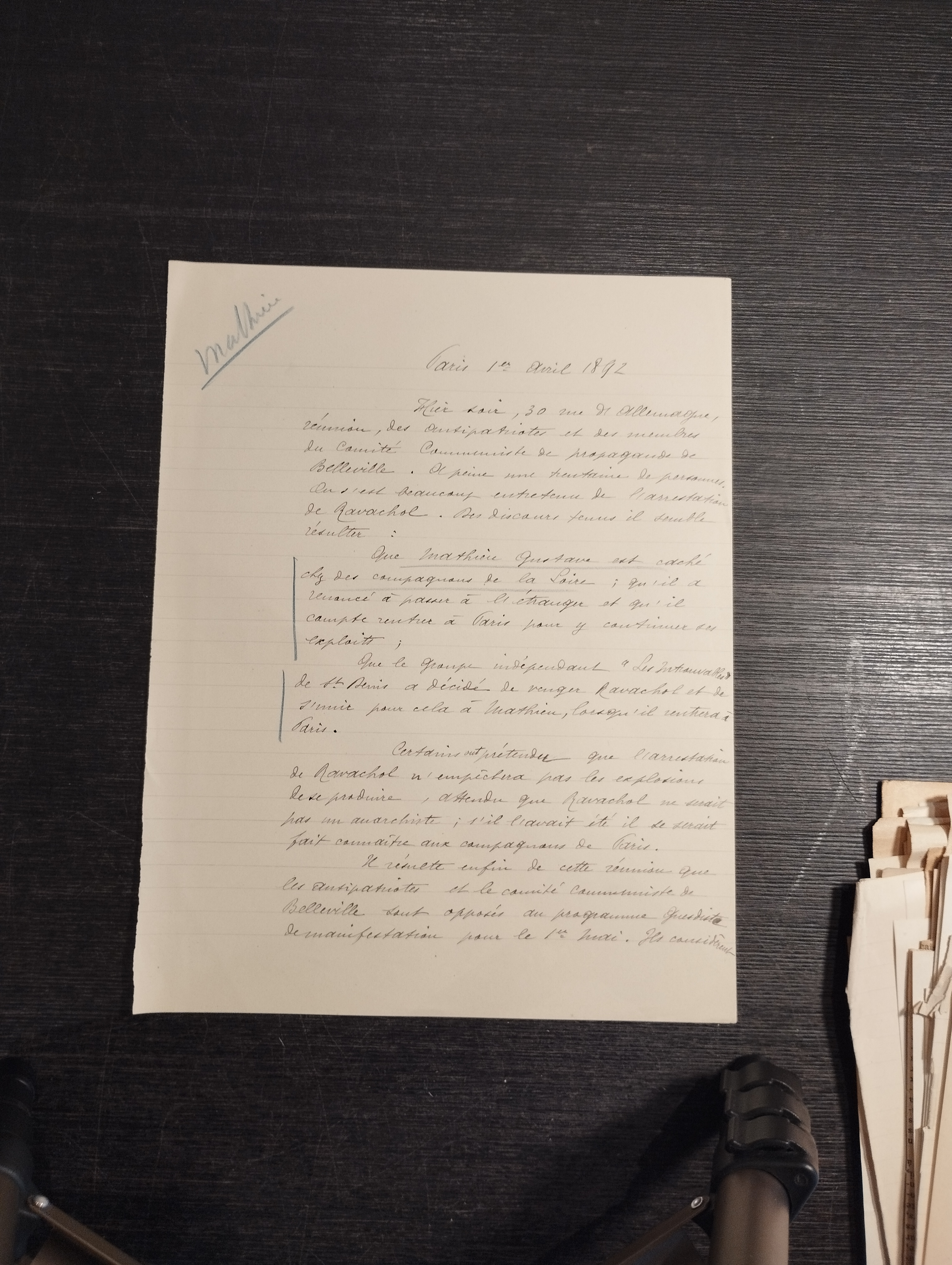
Report on Gustave Mathieu (courtesy of Archives Anarchistes)

In 1890, Mathieu moved to Saint-Ouen and joined the anarchist groups in the northern districts of Paris and Saint-Denis: groups characterized by a young, working-class population and relatively radical, advocating ideas such as individual reclamation and propaganda by the deed. He was also a member of the city's anarchist library, alongside figures like Philogone Segard, Désiré Pauwels, the Chaumentin couple, Charles 'Cookie' Simon, Élisée Bastard, and Auguste Heurteaux. He also collaborated with Zo d'Axa's paper, l'Endehors.

The anarchist lodged with companion Pompée Viard, but when the police showed up at Viard's home in August 1890 to arrest Mathieu, the latter was nowhere to be found. He ran as an abstentionist anarchist candidate in the 1890 legislative elections in the 2nd constituency of Saint-Denis.

In January 1891, Mathieu was arrested and convicted for his 'run-ins with the Saint-Ouen police' - he announced that upon his release, he would organize a conference on prisons.

=== Clichy affair, Ravachol, and the start of the Ère des attentats (1892-1894) ===
Following the Clichy affair, a case of police brutality affecting the Saint-Denis groups and shocking anarchists, Mathieu was tasked with companion Eugène Boutteville to publish a defense for the three victims then on trial: Henri Decamps, Louis Léveillé, and Charles Dardare. The police were not prosecuted during the trial, and apart from Léveillé, two of the three were sentenced to prison terms, which amplified the initial shock of police brutality among anarchists.

The judge presiding over the case, Edmond Benoît, became a target for a number of anarchists, who perceived him as the embodiment of the significant judicial and, more broadly, state repression affecting them in France. An affinity group then formed, possibly composed of Ravachol — an anarchist then on the run for a murder in Saint-Étienne and seeking refuge in Saint-Denis — Charles Simon, Charles Chaumentin/Chaumartin and his wife Clotilde, around whom the couple Rosalie Soubère-Joseph Jas-Béala also gravitated. This group, of which Mathieu was allegedly a member according to the police, began planning an attack aiming to assassinate judge Benoît.

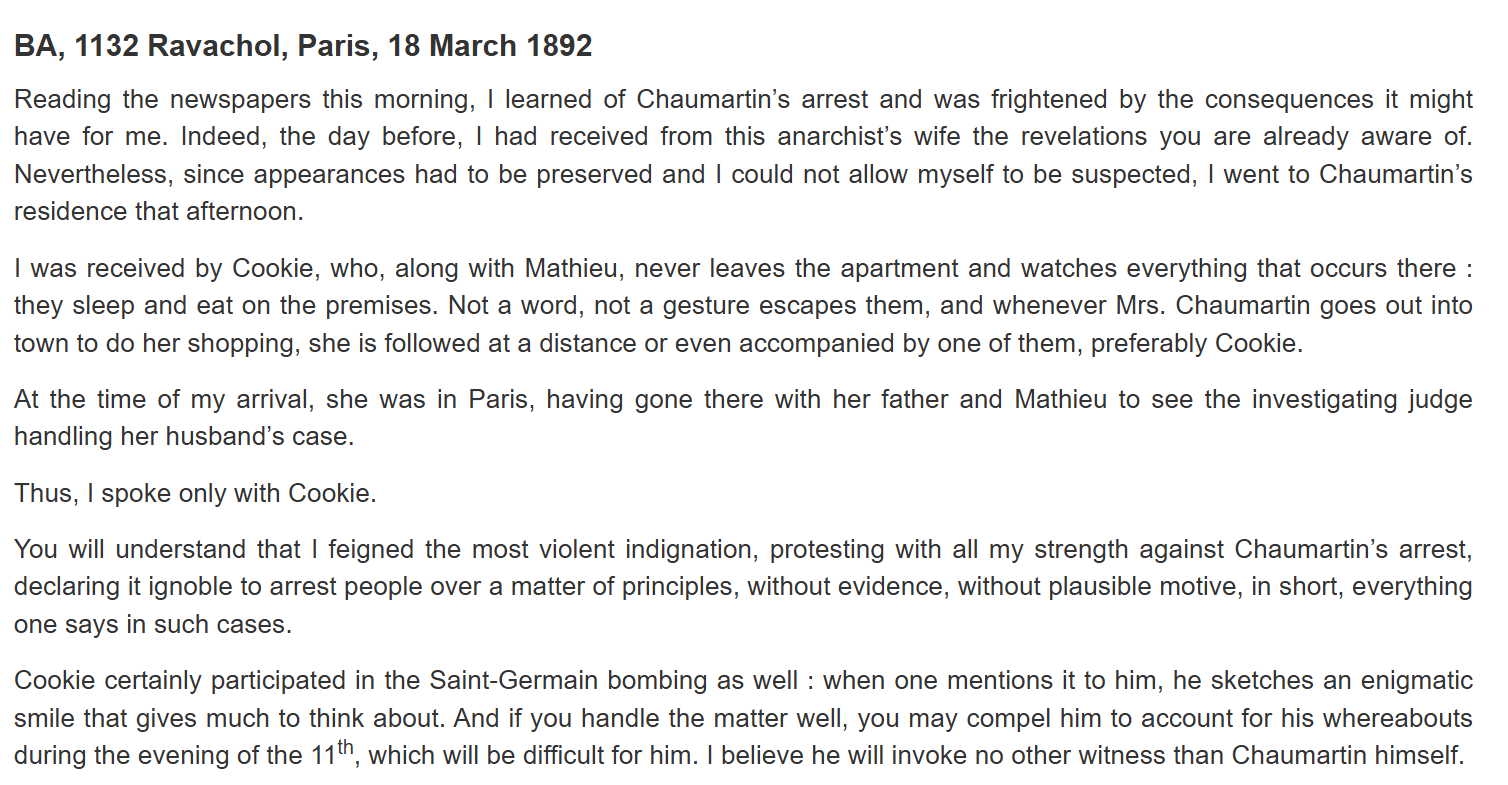
X2 speaking about the state of Ravachol's band after the attack (The Anarchist Library - Anarchiv)

Between late 1891 and early 1892, Mathieu was active in the unrest in Saint-Denis, getting involved in the anti-conscription lottery activities launched by anarchist groups there. In early February 1892, the police raided and arrested him with Charles Simon; they were living at the same address. They were accused of stealing the property of Pompée Viard, who had housed him, after his death. Both were released pending trial.

A few days later, a group of anarchists, likely belonging to the North Paris circles, such as Georges and possibly his brother Henri Etiévant, were involved in stealing a large shipment of dynamite from a quarry in Soisy-sur-Seine: this was the Soisy-sur-Seine theft. The stolen dynamite quickly circulated in the North Paris anarchist circles and largely ended up in the possession of Ravachol's band.

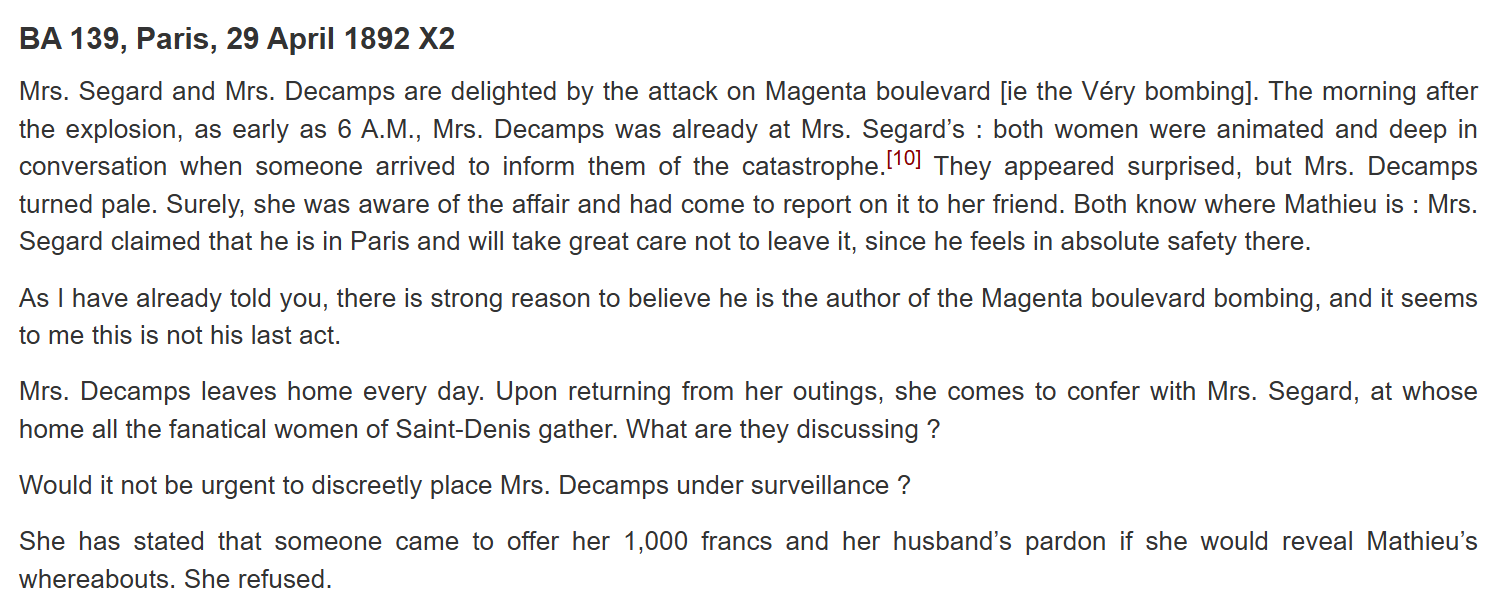
X2 suspecting Mathieu for the Véry bombing (The Anarchist Library - Anarchiv)

On 11 March 1892, Ravachol and other members of the group went to judge Benoît's residence, carrying with them a cooking pot concealing a bomb made with some of the stolen dynamite. The bomb was placed in the building where he lived because the anarchists did not know his precise dwelling within the edifice, and they left the scene. It exploded, causing no deaths but impressive and spectacular material damage—in the first days following the attack, the police knew nothing of the assailants.

Ravachol was denounced a few days later by the informer X2, who mentioned in his initial reports concerning the case that Mathieu was constantly at the Chaumentins' alongside Simon, with whom he was particularly watching Clotilde Chaumartin. According to X2, it would be impossible to obtain information from her if Mathieu and Simon were present, and he therefore urgently requested his arrest.

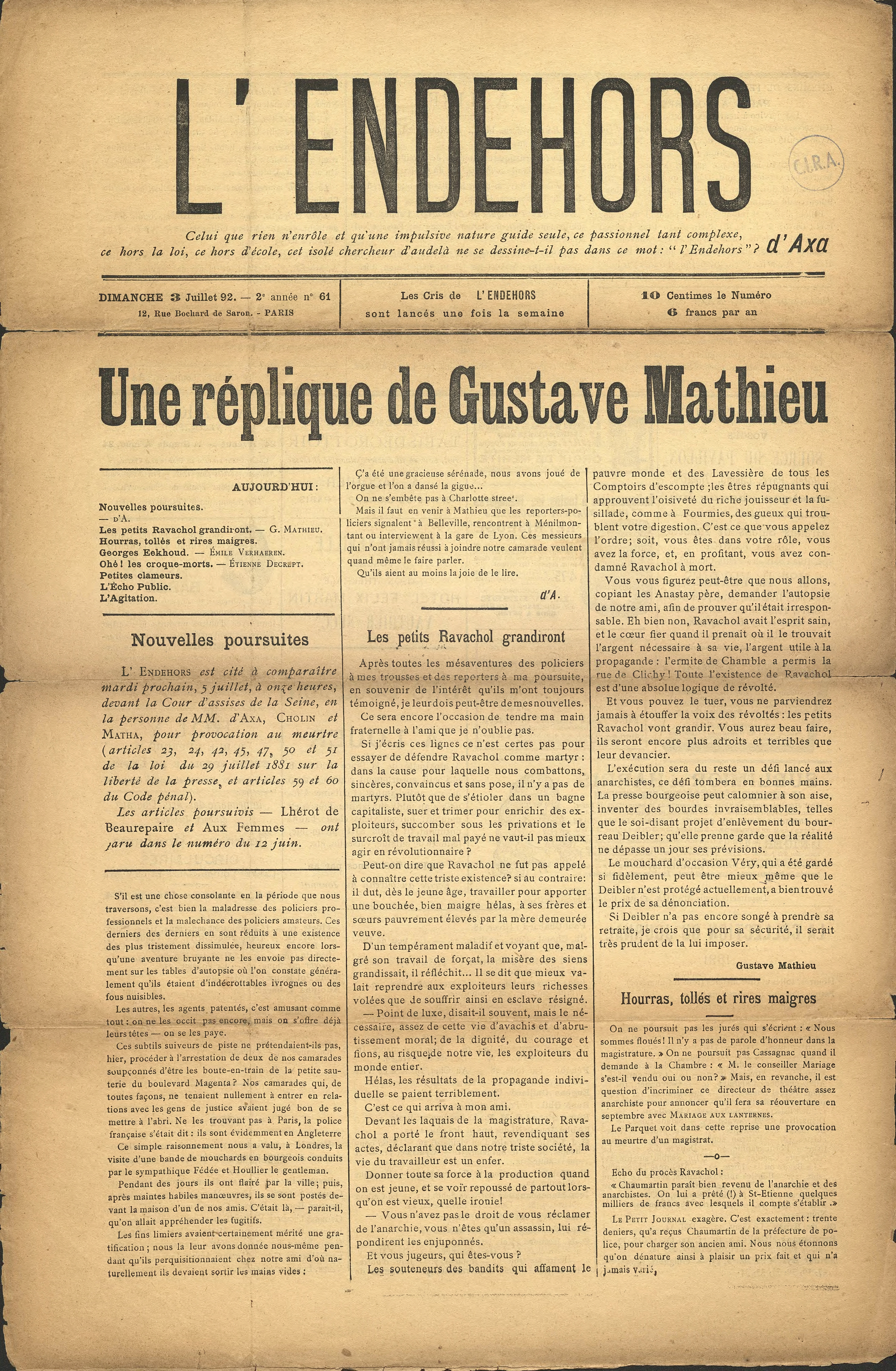
Front page of l'Endehors with an article by Gustave Mathieu (3 July 1892)

Mathieu, however, managed to go into hiding and escape, while other group members like Ravachol and Simon were arrested. He received a dismissal of charges before other prosecutions were opened, according to Le Père Peinard, which presented the maneuver as intentional on the part of the authorities to force him out of hiding and surrender.

While he was heavily sought after for these two bombings—with X2 also accusing him of being responsible for the Véry bombing in April 1892, an attack likely committed instead by Théodule Meunier, Fernand Bricout, and possibly Jean-Pierre François—the French police reported him in London at the beginning of that same month. He was working there as a machinist in a theater.

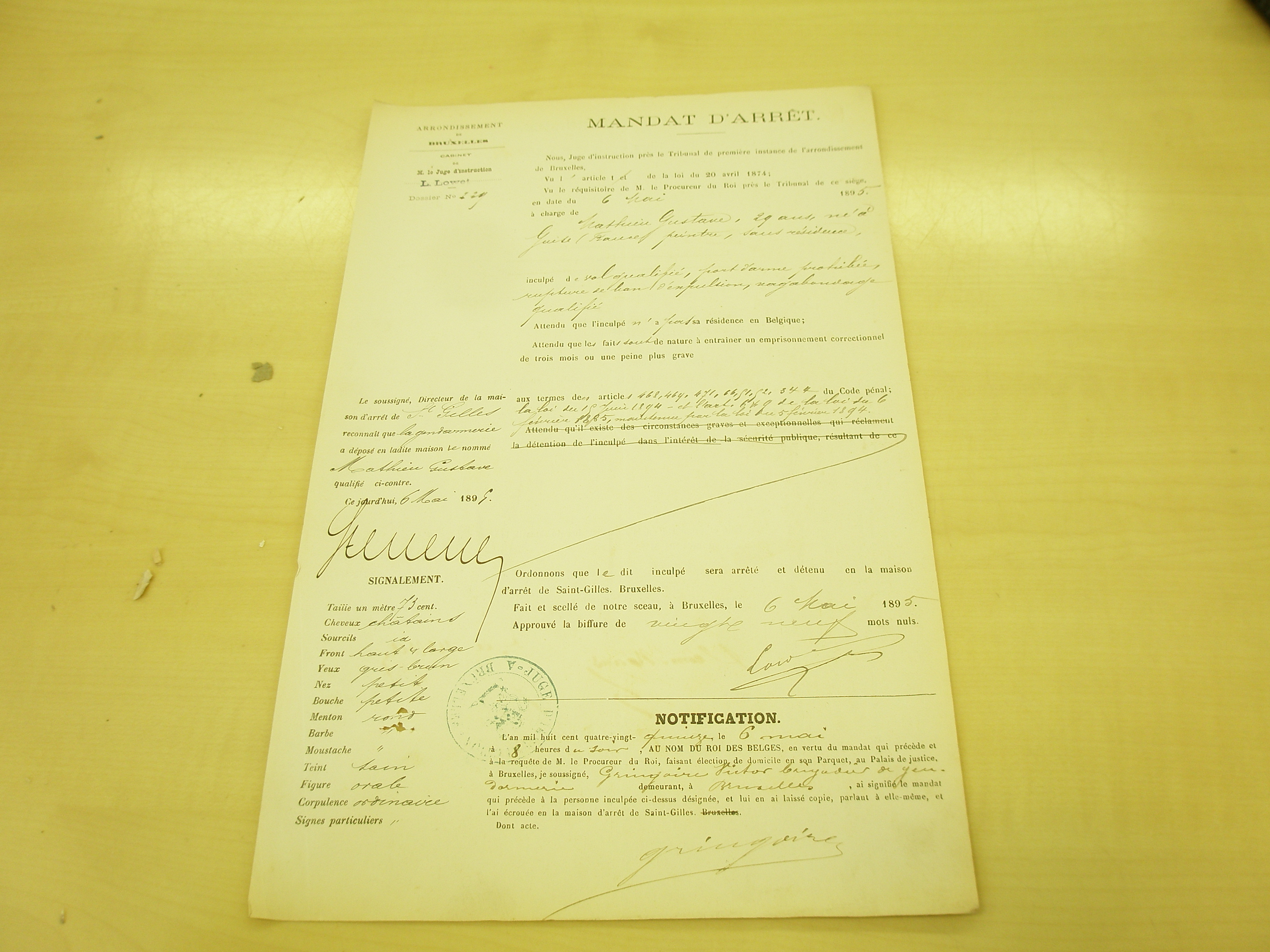
Mathieu court proceedings in a trial involving him and Rémy Schouppe in Belgium (courtesy of Archives Anarchistes)

Having returned to Belgium and residing at the home of Placide Schouppe's brother, Rémy 'Revolver' Schouppe, the police raided the house, from which he managed to escape by jumping out the window and fleeing to the Brussels-South station, where he successfully boarded a train and got away.

Returned to France, where Mathieu had benefited from a dismissal of charges for the bombings, he was still wanted for the theft at Viard's, a case in which he was convicted and sentenced to 6 months in prison. The police arrested him in March 1893 and he was acquitted by the Assize Court, before being condemned again, this time to one year of fixed prison term and two years of banishment by the correctional court. In October 1893, this sentence was increased by four months of prison following new accusations that he had defended himself while armed during his arrest.

Incarcerated at Laon prison, he was suspected of having passed coded notes on the manufacture of explosives to two anarchist co-detainees, Arthur Vautrain and Théodore Lardaux. During their trial for criminal association, he managed to be acquitted, while the other two anarchists were sentenced to five and eight years of hard labor in the penal colony.

Upon his release, Mathieu rejoined the United Kingdom, where he settled at 65 Charlotte Street. There, he associated with Agresti and Alessandro Marocco, an illegalist anarchist from the Intransigeants, and was involved in a burglary in Belgium in 1895 intended to finance an escape for his friend Charles Simon. Arrested, the anarchist was put on trial in Louvain and condemned to five years in prison.

=== Release, revolutionary syndicalism, and final years ===
He served his sentence by reading and educating himself, then returned to France after his release. He then worked there as a lingerie salesman in the markets of the Île-de-France region, before returning to Guise, where he continued the same job.

Mathieu was still noted as an anarchist in the years following his release—at least until the 1910s, he was noted by the authorities as being responsible for the revolutionary group in Guise.

During the inter-war period, the anarchist was a faithful subscriber to the revolutionary syndicalist newspaper La Révolution prolétarienne, run by Pierre Monatte.

Gustave Mathieu died on 14 January 1947 in Guise.

== Legacy ==
=== Influence on the launch of the Ère des attentats (1892-1894) ===
The Saint-Germain bombing and the subsequent Clichy bombing, for which Mathieu was also suspected, were defining events marking France's entry into the period that the contemporary press and Jean Maitron called the Ère des attentats (1892-1894), a period characterized by great political violence from both the French authorities and the anarchists, and by cycles of escalating violence. The arrest of Ravachol and Simon, and the former's death sentence, were particularly significant in this development.

=== Mugshots ===
Several of his mugshots taken by Alphonse Bertillon are part of the collections of the Metropolitan Museum of Art (MET), including one with a fake beard.

== Bibliography ==
- Accoce, Pierre (1998). "« Ils ont eu Sadi Carnot ! »" [They got Sadi Carnot!]. Ces assassins qui ont voulu changer l'Histoire (in French). Paris: Plon. ISBN 978-2259189873.
- Bouhey, Vivien (2008), Les Anarchistes contre la République [The Anarchists against the Republic] (in French), Rennes: Presses universitaires de Rennes (PUR)
- Dupuy, Rolf (2025), "MATHIEU, Gustave, Louis", Dictionnaire international des militants anarchistes, Paris
- Maitron, Jean (1955), Histoire du mouvement anarchiste en France (1800-1914) (in French), Paris: Histoire du mouvement anarchiste en France, 1880-1914
- Maitron, Jean; Enckell, Marianne; Dupuy, Rolf; Petit, Dominique; Davranche, Guillaume (2024), MATHIEU, Gustave, Louis, Paris: Le Maitron
- Merriman, John M. (2016). The dynamite club: how a bombing in fin-de-siècle Paris ignited the age of modern terror. Yale University Press. ISBN 978-0-300-21792-6.
