= Berthe bombing =

1887 anarchist bombing in Paris, France

- Part of Propaganda of the deed
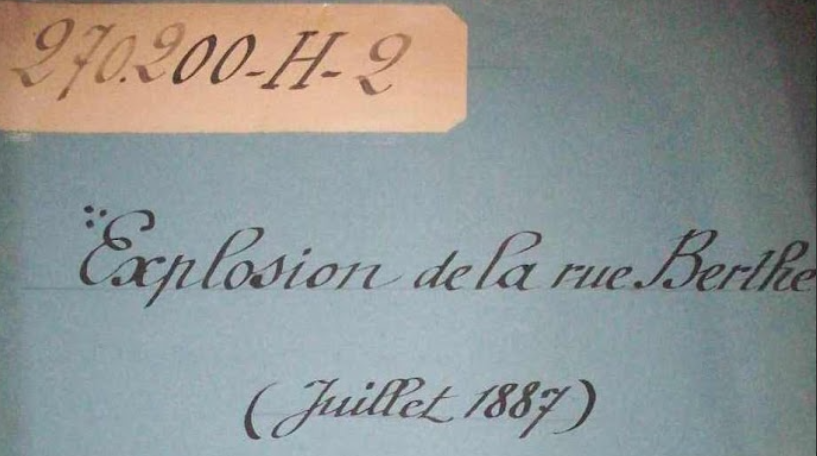
- Cover of the police file on the bombing (courtesy of Archives Anarchistes)
- Location: 48°53′10″N 2°20′19″E; 46, Berthe street
- Date: 6 July 1887
- Attack type: bombing
- Deaths: 0
- Injuries: 0
- Perpetrators: Paolo Chiericotti (?); Vittorio Pini (?); Intransigents of London and Paris (?)
- Motive: Anarchism; Revenge against a landlord in conflict with several anarchists
- Accused: 3
- Convicted: 0

The Berthe bombing was a bomb attack carried out in Paris on the night of 5–6 July 1887, by anarchists targeting the shop of a landlord at 46 Berthe street. The explosion destroyed the shop's storefront around three in the morning, caused a panic among the few passers-by on the street, and resulted in no casualties. It was likely an act of vengeance aimed at a landlord who was in conflict with various Italian anarchists.

Although the precise perpetrators of the bombing were never found, the fact that the target, Viguier, had had run-ins a few months earlier with three Italian anarchists among his tenants—one of whom had been convicted just days prior for assault and battery against Viguier—led authorities to suspect the three Italian anarchists: Figeri, Pogni, and Paolo Chiericotti. The police discovered traces of gunpowder at their homes, but lacked sufficient evidence to implicate them, and they were released.

Later, authorities began to suspect Vittorio Pini, who was close to Chiericotti and a member of the group the Intransigents of London and Paris. He left French territory in October 1887 and took refuge in Belgium. One of Pini's associates, Placide Schouppe, became the main suspect for the anarchist bombing campaign of 1888–1889 the following year, a campaign that also targeted the storefronts of buildings in the middle of the night.

== History ==
=== Context ===
Anarchism was born and developed in Europe during the 19th century before spreading. Anarchists advocate for the struggle against all forms of domination perceived as unjust, among which is economic domination, with the development of capitalism. They are particularly opposed to the State, seen as the institution that supports and gives birth to many of these dominations through its police, army, and propaganda.

At the end of the 1870s, anarchists developed the strategy of propaganda by the deed, aiming to communicate anarchist ideas directly through action, without recourse to discourse, and to precipitate the Revolution through actions that incite the people to revolt. Leading anarchist figures extensively developed this strategy, such as Peter Kropotkin, Errico Malatesta, Andrea Costa, Carlo Cafiero, and especially Johann Most. In 1879, it was adopted by the congress of the Jura Federation in La Chaux-de-Fonds. In 1880, it was discussed in Vevey during a meeting that produced a 'Charter of Propaganda by the Deed'; adopted the following year by the first exclusively anarchist congress in France, the Paris Congress, in May 1881. It gained renewed centrality at the International Congress of London in July 1881.

In 1881, the first attack of this nature in France, the Saint-Germain-en-Laye bombing, failed to destroy the statue of Adolphe Thiers that it targeted. In the years that followed, the practice became widespread in anarchist circles in France—especially as the French State's repression against them intensified, which created dynamics of vengeance on the part of the anarchists.

In the 19th century, seeking economic prospects, a number of Italians emigrated to France to find employment, particularly in the Paris region, and a number of them subscribed to anarchism.

=== Premices ===
In early 1887, three Italian anarchist shoemakers decided to stop paying their landlord. Their names were Pierre Figeri, Paolo Chiericotti, and a man named Pogni. When the landlord, named Viguier, tried to evict them—or when they attempted a déménagement à la cloche de bois (meaning trying to leave without informing him or paying rent), he was violently struck in the face. The anarchists allegedly made death threats against him, and he filed a complaint against them.

A few months later, Pogni was sentenced to four months in prison as a result of Viguier's complaint.

=== Berthe bombing ===
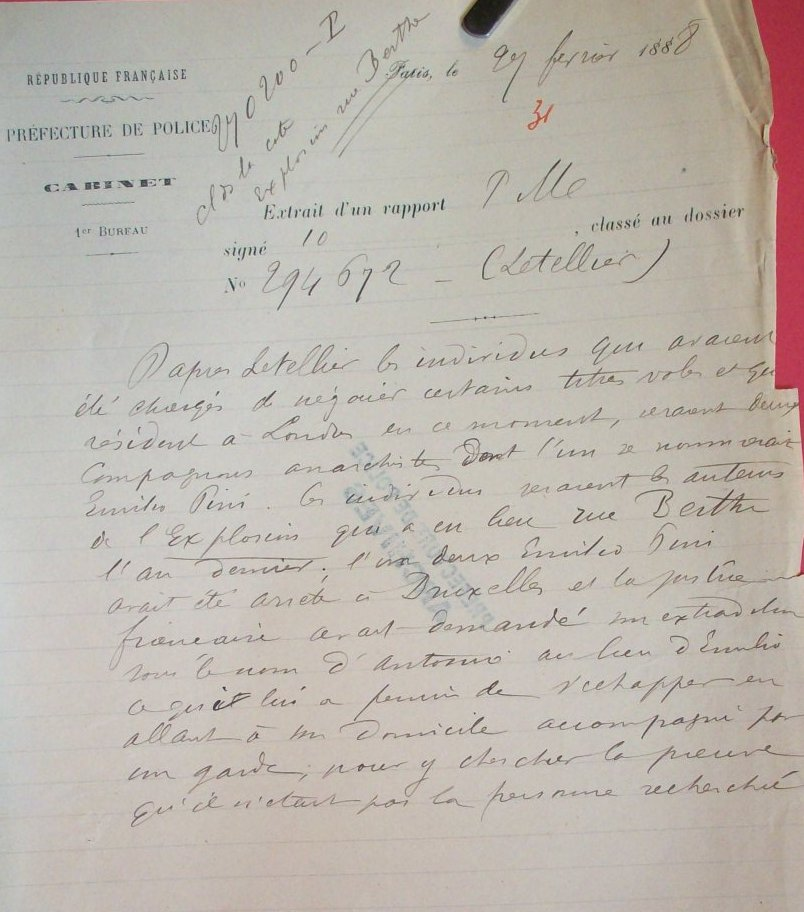
French police suspecting Vittorio Pini for the Berthe bombing (courtesy of Archives Anarchistes)

On the night of 5-6 July 1887, around three in the morning, just two days after the anarchist's conviction, an explosion destroyed the storefront of Viguier's shop at 46 rue Berthe.

The blast shattered windows down the street and those of the targeted building up to the third floor. The few passersby at that hour fled, while local residents were woken up by the force of the explosion and rushed into the street to assess the damage.

Meanwhile, the building's occupants tried to get out and secure their belongings, fearing the structure might collapse. They were eventually reassured upon seeing the effects of the explosion—which had caused significant damage only to the façade of Viguier's grocery store.

=== Aftermath and suspicions on Vittorio Pini ===
Given that the three shoemakers in contention with Viguier were central suspects, they were arrested and raided. The police found traces of powder at their homes, including Chiericotti's, but did not have enough evidence to decisively implicate them or secure a conviction at trial. They were therefore provisionally released.

French police suspected Vittorio Pini, who was close to Chiericotti and a central member of the Intransigents of London and Paris, an illegalist anarchist group composed of a number of Italians. Pini left French territory in October and found refuge in Belgium.

The following year, Placide Schouppe, another associate of Pini linked to the Intransigents, was the main suspect for the anarchist bombing campaign of 1888–1889, though his guilt was never proven. This campaign also targeted storefronts—specifically, employment agencies—in the middle of the night.

== Primary sources ==
=== Police archives ===
Collection of the site-archive Archives Anarchistes uploaded to Commons comprising:

- Ba 138 — 1887 rue Berthe bombing (44 pages) (Archives de la préfecture de police de Paris)

== Bibliography ==
- Bouhey, Vivien (2008), Les Anarchistes contre la République [The Anarchists against the Republic] (in French), Rennes: Presses universitaires de Rennes (PUR), ISBN 9782753507272
- Davranche, Guillaume; Petit, Dominique (2024), "CHIERICOTTI Paul [Pierre, Paul, Jacques, dit ; aussi Chericotti, Ricotti, Paul LAURENT", Dictionnaire des anarchistes (Le Maitron), Paris: Le Maitron des anarchistes
- Dornel, Laurent (2019), L'anti-italianisme est-il un racisme ? (France, Années 1880-1900) [Is anti-Italianism a racism? (France, years 1890-1900)] (in French), PUBP
- Eisenzweig, Uri (2001). Fictions de l'anarchisme [Fictions of anarchism] (in French). France: C. Bourgois. ISBN 2-267-01570-6.
- Jourdain, Edouard (2013). L'anarchisme [Anarchism]. Paris: La Découverte. ISBN 978-2-7071-9091-8.
- Merriman, John M. (2016). The dynamite club: how a bombing in fin-de-siècle Paris ignited the age of modern terror. Yale University Press. ISBN 978-0-300-21792-6.
- Petit, Dominique; S, P (2025), "SCHOUPPE, Placide", Dictionnaire international des militants anarchistes, Paris
- Ward, Colin (2004). Anarchism: A Very Short Introduction. Oxford University Press (OUP).
