= Alessandro Marocco =

Italian-Egyptian illegalist anarchist

- Born: 1839-1841; Suez, Egypt
- Citizenship: Italy, Egypt
- Occupations: umbrella seller anarchist
- Known for: Being one of the first illegalists
- Movement: Anarchism

Alessandro Marocco (1839/1841-?), nicknamed Maroucq, was an Italian and Egyptian illegalist anarchist. He is best known for his central role in the birth and formation of illegalism, belonging not only to one of the first groups of this nature, the Intransigents of London and Paris, but also being suspected by the French police authorities of being at the head of a worldwide 'steering committee' of anarchists composed of Peter Kropotkin and Errico Malatesta. This police interpretation is erroneous, but Marocco nonetheless seems to have played a fundamental role in the first illegalist networks in Western Europe.

Born in Egypt, Marocco moved to France in the second half of the 1880s, joining the anarchist movement and the Intransigents group there. He left the country after the Mirandola stabbing, where some group members like Vittorio Pini and Luigi Parmeggiani stabbed an Italian socialist deputy, to settle in London, where he opened an umbrella shop. This shop was noted as serving to fence and resell stolen goods by illegalist gangs on the European continent, and Marocco appears to have been involved in a number of burglaries: he was also associated with a large number of illegalists such as Henry, Pini, Parmeggiani, Schouppe, and Ortiz.

== Biography ==
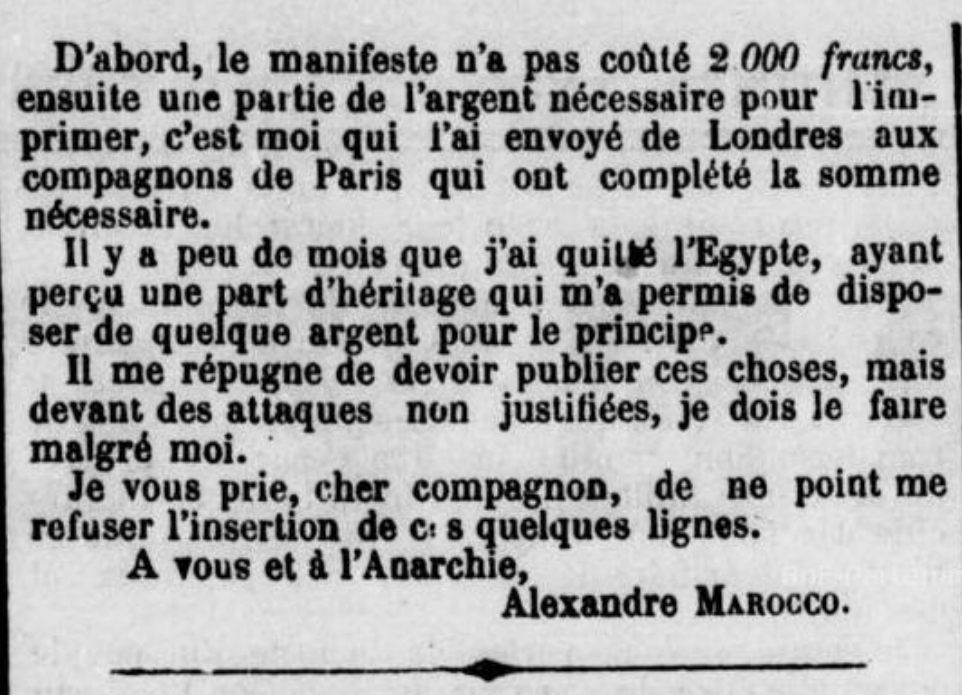
End of Marocco's intervention in Le Révolté concerning the conflicts leading up to the Mirandola stabbing, from London (10 March 1889)

Alessandro Marocco was born in Suez, Egypt, between 1839 and 1841. According to his own testimony in La Révolte in 1889, one of the main anarchist newspapers in France during the 1880s and 1890s, he had inherited a sum of money in Egypt before joining Western Europe, which allowed him to finance the anarchist movement.

In any case, by the end of the 1880s, Marocco was in the Paris region, where he joined the group of the Intransigents of London and Paris, formed around Italian anarchists like Vittorio Pini or Luigi Parmeggiani. While part of the group was arrested and implicated in the Mirandola stabbing, Marocco fled France and took refuge in London, where he opened an umbrella shop at 160 Dean Street. He was already in London in March 1889, less than a month after the attack and before the members were arrested.

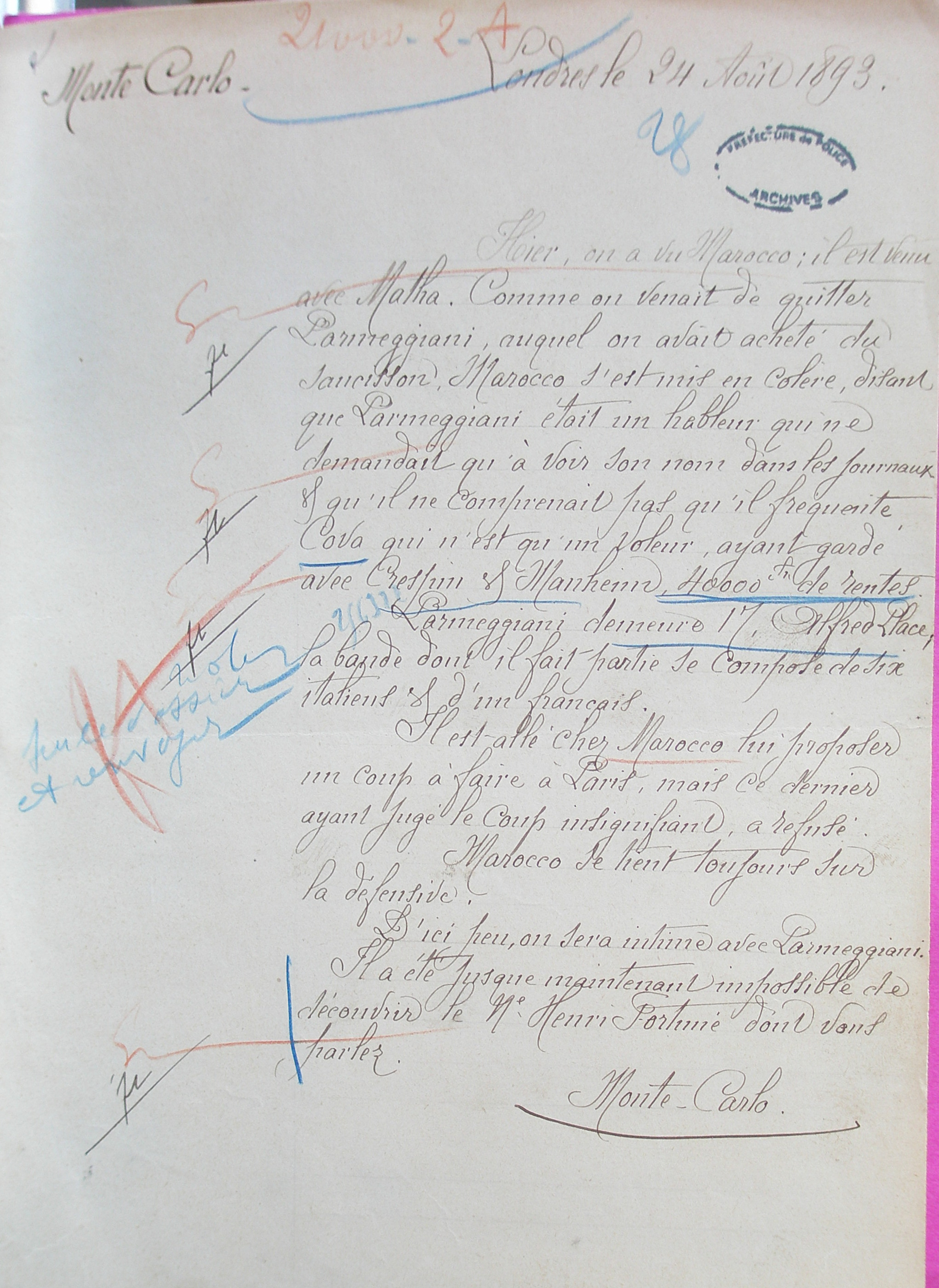
Report from a police informant about Marocco and his conflict with Luigi Parmeggiani, whom he allegedly found too pretentious, too 'public' regarding his activities, and close to figures who were supposedly not anarchists (courtesy of Archives Anarchistes)

From this shop, Marocco maintained ties with anarchists, particularly other illegalists. He was frequently suspected of fencing goods stolen by illegalists on the continent, for example in France, and his shop was suspected by French authorities of being merely a 'cover' for receiving stolen goods. He was notably believed to have fenced some of the goods stolen by Placide Schouppe, another illegalist linked to the Intransigents. Marocco was also linked to Léon Ortiz, who was himself close to the Intransigents and a member of the Ortiz gang.

Marocco was suspected by the French authorities of belonging to an anarchist worldwide 'steering committee' located in London and composed of Kropotkin, Malatesta, and Malato. Historian Constance Bantman points out that the French police informants were mistaken in assuming the existence of a 'sprawling steering committee' that anarchists had allegedly set up to secretly prepare the Revolution on the European continent.

Although these descriptions from the informants don't exactly reflect the reality of what was happening in London during this period and there was no international anarchist plot, historian Vivien Bouhey believes that in Marocco's case, he was likely involved in a number of burglaries with a large number of anarchists, such as Émile Henry. Regarding his role in the illegalist burglaries of the time, he writes:

If we synthesize the information reported by the London informants throughout the year 1893, Malato, Malatesta, and especially Marocco appear to be at the center of the [illegalist/burglary] operations decided upon on the continent. Indeed, it is to them that most of the Frenchmen who came to London to negotiate stolen securities turned: they were connected, on the one hand, with men like Aubryot or Escarré (aided by his friend Capt), who respectively ran shops where they melted down the stolen objects, and on the other hand, with pseudo-businessmen tasked with presenting the securities for negotiation in Paris, such as Ernest Mauritz, Joseph Crespin, or Manem de Bauttreville. It was up to them to propose the work to reliable and determined henchmen like the Schouppe brothers, Gustave Mathieu, Magrini, and perhaps Émile Henry, who carried out the initial scouting on site before often proceeding to action in a daring manner.

In addition, Marocco met Émile Henry between the Carmaux-Bons Enfants and the Terminus attacks. He was linked to anarchists potentially involved in the second attack, a group composed, among others, of Louis Matha, Désiré Pauwels, Paolo Chiericotti—who was also linked to the Intransigents—and Léon Ortiz. According to his own testimony about the affair, a month later, Henry had allegedly planned to settle in Paris to launch the attack—or even a series of attacks.

Marocco married an Englishwoman and died on an unknown date. He was given various nicknames, such as 'Martin', 'Maroucq', and 'Marocq'.

== Physical depiction ==
Although Alphonse Bertillon did not photograph Marocco for his anthropometric file of anarchists, he described him as follows:

A particularly dangerous subject who, although not photographed, is easily recognizable by his relatively advanced age (53 years old) and his pronounced limp. Believed to have been born in Suez. Average height.

== Bibliography ==
- Bantman, Constance (2007), Anarchismes et anarchistes en France et en Grande-Bretagne, 1880-1914 : Échanges, représentations, transferts [Anarchisms and Anarchists in France and Great Britain, 1880-1914: Exchanges, Representations, Transfers (PhD thesis)] (in French), Paris: Université Paris XIII
- Bouhey, Vivien (2008), Les Anarchistes contre la République [The Anarchists against the Republic] (in French), Rennes: Presses universitaires de Rennes (PUR), ISBN 9782753507272
- Davranche, Guillaume (2024), "MAROCCO Alexandre [dit Martin, Marocq, Maroucq]", Dictionnaire des anarchistes (Le Maitron), Paris: Le Maitron des anarchistes
- Dupuy, Rolf (2025), "MAROCCO, Alexandre "MARTIN" ; "MAROCQ" ; "MAROUCQ"", Dictionnaire international des militants anarchistes, Paris
- Petit, Dominique (2023), Fortuné Henry et la colonie libertaire d'Aiglemont : de la propagande pour Ravachol au syndicalisme révolutionnaire [Fortuné Henry and the Aiglemont Libertarian Colony: From Propaganda for Ravachol to Revolutionary Syndicalism], Paris: Terres Ardennaises / Noir et Rouge
