= Santa Maria Maggiore, Mirandola =

Church in Mirandola, Italy

Coordinates: 44.8860°N 11.0665°E

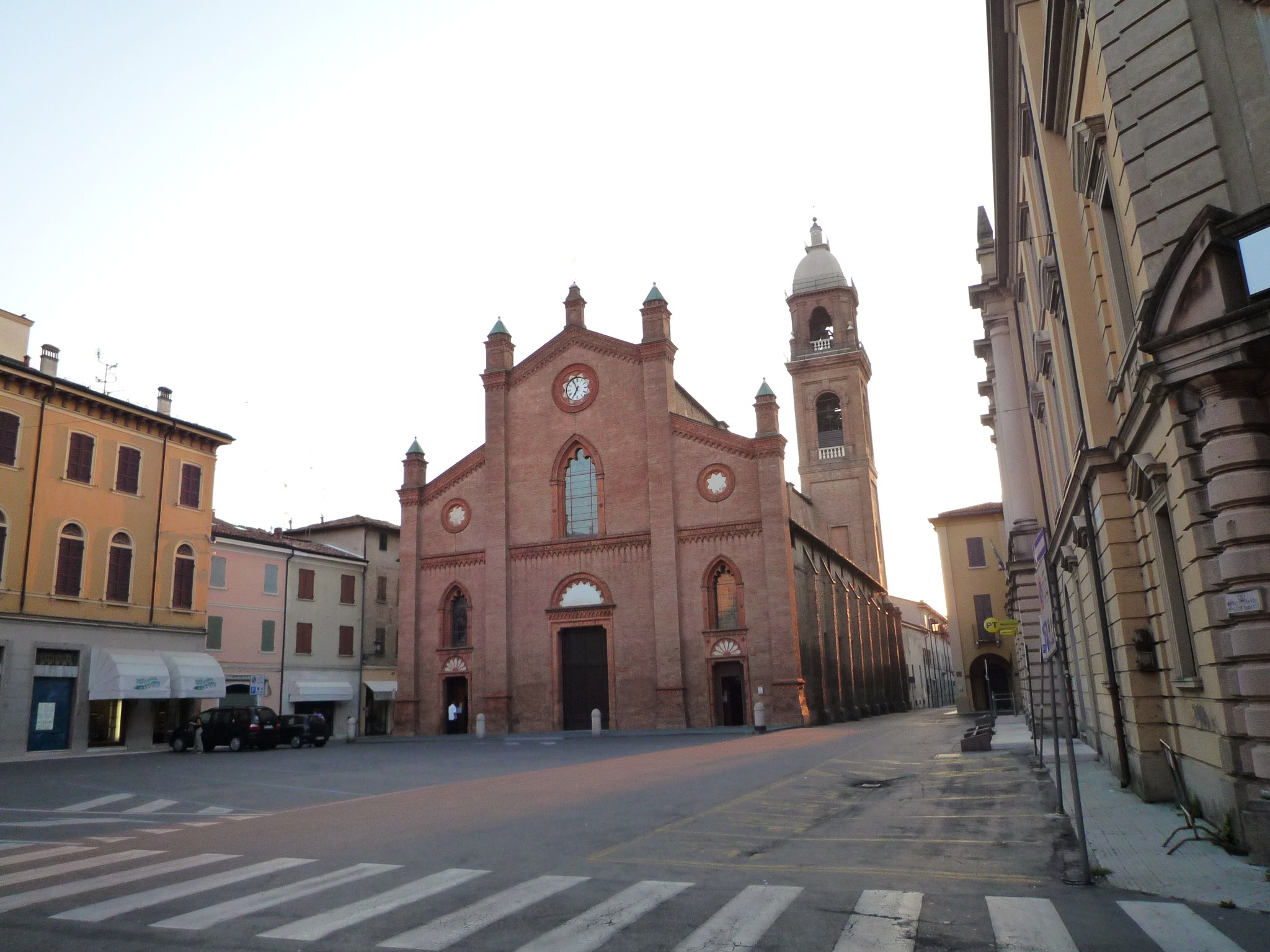
The church before the earthquake of 2012

The Church of Santa Maria Maggiore (Italian: Duomo di Mirandola; Chiesa di Santa Maria Maggiore, Mirandola) is a Gothic Roman Catholic church in the center of the town of Mirandola, province of Modena, Region of Emilia Romagna, Italy.

== History ==
The present church was rebuilt in the 1400s by Giovanni and Francesco Pico, the then lords of Mirandola. The apse and side walls were built at that time in the Gothic style, whereas the present Gothic façade is a recent restoration. The bell-tower towards the rear of the church is from the 17th century. The interior houses paintings by Sante Peranda. The Chapel of the Madonna di Pompei has a gilded Baroque altar of the 17th century. The church has been closed since 2012 because of damage from the 2012 Emilia earthquakes.
