= Celso Ceretti =

Italian anarchist (1844–1909)

- Ceretti in a photograph
- Born: 13 January 1844; Mirandola, Emilia-Romagna, Papal States
- Died: 12 January 1909 (aged 64); Ferrara, Emilia-Romagna, Italy
- Occupation: Politician

Celso Ceretti (13 January 1844 – 12 January 1909) was an Italian supporter of Giuseppe Garibaldi, an internationalist anarchist and then a socialist politician.

== Early years ==
Celso Ceretti was born on 23 January 1844 in Mirandola, Emilia-Romagna, at the time part of the Papal States, the son of Luigi Ceretti and Maria Malagodi. His father had been imprisoned for the riots of 1831 and educated his children in democratic ideals. When he was fourteen, he enlisted in Garibaldi's expedition to Sicily. He joined in 1859. In 1860–1861, he served in Sicily and the mainland with the rank of sergeant. In 1862, he was in Aspromonte. In 1866, he became an officer of the 9th regiment. In 1867, he served in Agro Romano. He became one of Garibaldi's closest followers and later served as a link between him and the labor movement.

== Activist ==
In 1870, Cerretti joined Garibaldi's Army of the Vosges. In 1871, he participated in the defense of France and the Paris Commune. That year, he founded the Anti-Catholic Republican Society in Mirandola. Ceretti was one of the founders of the Italian Section of the International Workingmen's Association (IWA).

By 1871, Garibaldi was still respected by socialists elsewhere in Italy, but it was only in Romagna that his leadership was seen as essential for a people's republic. At first, Ceretti, Lodovico Nabruzzi and Paride Suzzara Verdi shared this view. Garibaldi planned to call a democratic congress, but he canceled it due to the factional squabbles. With Mikhail Bakunin's support, Nabruzzi, Ceretti, Andrea Costa and others arranged a conference on 17 March 1872 in Bologna, where most of the internationalist sections of Romagna were represented. The congress rejected Giuseppe Mazzini's view that the question of social reform could follow creation of a republic and also voted against participating in elections, in effect moving towards Bakunin's position.

On 11 March 1873, Ceretti was arrested for his IWA activities and imprisoned for five months. He was then tried for "conspiracy" and acquitted. Later that year, he tried to organize a second IWA Congress in Mirandola, but this was forbidden by the authorities. In 1873, he commanded a force in Spain against the Carlists. In 1874, he was assistant to Mićo Ljubibratić in Herzegovina. In 1875, he commanded the Italian Legion in Serbia with the rank of major in the struggle against Turkish rule.

== Mirandola stabbing and later years ==
In 1886, Ceretti founded the Society of Radical Veterans. In 1888, in Mirandola, he founded the socialist periodical Il Sole dell'Avvenire (The Sun of the Future). In 1890, he was the first socialist to enter the municipal council of Mirandola.

He came into conflict with the anarchists of the Intransigents of London and Paris group after they published a text targeting Amilcare Cipriani, another defector from anarchism who had become a socialist politician. In their text, the Manifesto degl’ anarchici in lingua italiana al popolo d’Italia, the anarchists accused him of defending nationalist positions. In response to these criticisms, Ceretti used his newspaper to target the anarchists in question, describing them as police informants and provocateurs. The insults contained in the newspaper greatly displeased the main subjects, Vittorio Pini and Luigi Parmeggiani, who traveled to Mirandola to 'settle the score' with him. They stabbed him, and he survived, according to Pini simply because, upon entering his house, he noticed Ceretti had a child, which reportedly prompted him to spare his life.

Ceretti died on 12 January 1909 in Ferrara.

== Sources ==
- "Celso Ceretti", Anarcoefemèrides del 12 de gener, Estel Negre, 12 January 2013
- Masini, Pier Carlo (1979). "Ceretti, Celso". Dizionario Biografico degli Italiani (in Italian). Vol. 23.
- Ravindranathan, T. R. (October 1981), "The Paris Commune and the First International in Italy: Republicanism versus Socialism, 1871-1872", The International History Review, 3 (4), Taylor & Francis: 482–516, doi:10.1080/07075332.1981.9640259, JSTOR 40105174
