= Intransigents of London and Paris =

Former individualist and illegalist anarchist group in Western Europe

Intransigents
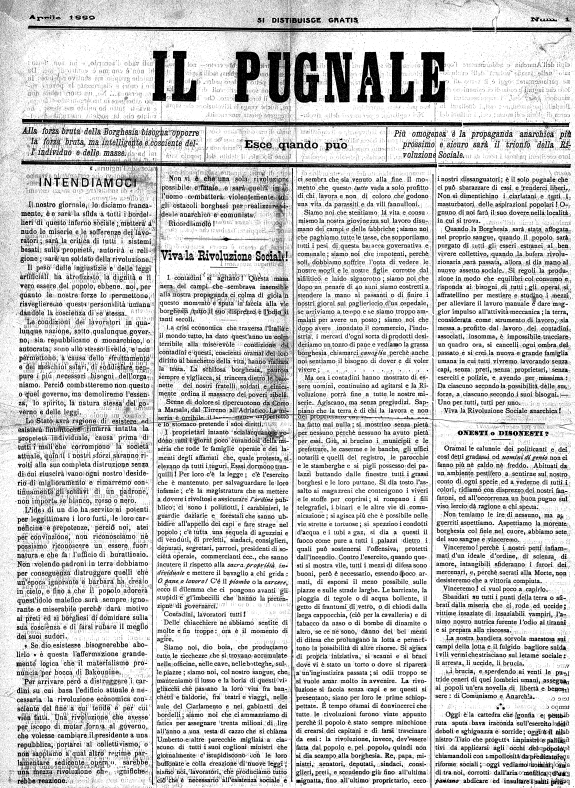
- Front page of Il Pugnale, a newspaper publlished by the group after the Mirandola stabbing
- Leaders: Vittorio Pini; Luigi Parmeggiani; Alessandro Marocco; Paolo Chiericotti; Annette Soubrier (?); Maria Saenens
- Dates active: 1880s-1890s
- Active regions: Western Europe
- Ideology: Anarchism; Individualist anarchism; Illegalism
- Political position: Far-left
- Status: Defunct

The Intransigents of London and Paris, or in short, the Intransigents (in Italian: Gli Intransigenti di Londra e Parigi), was an individualist and illegalist anarchist group founded in the 1880s in Paris. Initially bringing together Italian anarchist activists in Western Europe, including Vittorio Pini and Luigi Parmeggiani, the group engaged in a series of thefts and armed robberies in France and associated with non-Italian anarchists, such as Placide Schouppe or Élise Pelgrom and their Schouppe gang. Alongside Clément Duval, the members of this group were among the first to align themselves with the emerging ideology of illegalism and played a key role in inspiring later illegalist groups. Furthermore, the members published texts and manifestos and used the profits from their thefts and robberies to finance anarchist groups, actions, and newspapers—founding their own printing press for this purpose.

After Pini's arrest, his trial saw him theorizing individual reclamation and providing a philosophical justification for this practice while also asserting the political nature of all his burglaries. This development sparked intense debates within the anarchist movement in France and the United Kingdom, which had to take a stance on this new practice. Some groups and activists accepted it as legitimate, arguing that it allowed them to reclaim from the bourgeoisie a portion of what it had stolen from the people. Others, like Francesco Saverio Merlino, viewed it as an egoist or futile practice, maintaining that the anarchists' goal should be to generalize the revolt against the entire system rather than engaging in a series of localized and individual uprisings. In general, these debates reflected the ongoing distinction between individualist anarchists and anarcho-communists, a divide that was particularly pronounced in France.

Parmeggiani, who, unlike Pini, kept a significant portion of his profits for himself rather than for the anarchist cause, continued his thefts and publications for some time before abandoning anarchism a few years later. Although Pini was arrested and Parmeggiani renounced anarchism, they left a lasting mark on the anarchist movement in France during this period through their use of revolutionary banditry, which persisted after them, culminating with the Bonnot Gang.

== History ==
=== Context ===
In the 19th century, anarchism emerged and took shape in Europe before spreading. Anarchists advocated a struggle against all forms of domination perceived as unjust including economic domination brought forth by capitalism. They were particularly opposed to the State, seen as the organization that legitimized these dominations through its police, army and propaganda.

Anarchist activists faced significant repression from political powers in Western Europe during the 1870s and 1880s. This repression led to various dynamics, including a traumatic relationship with the French state and, more broadly, a radicalization of anarchist discourse and practices. Furthermore, the fact that other countries, such as Italy, acted in a similar manner contributed to significant mobility among anarchists, who found themselves in cities like Geneva, London, and Paris, among others.

The 1880s marked the beginning of a distinction between two tendencies within anarchism. On one side were the individualist anarchists, who placed less emphasis on mass struggle and focused more on the role of the individual in anarchism. On the other side were the anarcho-communists, who viewed anarchism as a collective aspiration that needed to be achieved through common and organized efforts. While this emerging distinction should not be seen as a clear-cut rupture—given that the two tendencies remained ideologically close, that activists could move between them, and that both currents supported each other, as seen during the Era of Attacks (1892–1894)—it nevertheless helps explain part of the ideological perspectives of this period.

=== History of the group ===
==== Founding and first actions ====
The Intransigents group was founded in Paris in the 1880s by Italian anarchist activists, including Vittorio Pini, Luigi Parmeggiani, Alessandro Marocco, Caio Zavoli, and Giacomo Merlino. The group was also known by other names, such as 'Untraceables' or the 'Rebels of Saint-Denis', among others.

At the time, Parmeggiani was a prominent figure in London's individualist anarchist circles, while Pini arrived in Paris after passing through Geneva to escape a conviction in Italy. Shortly after its formation, the group engaged in individual reclamation—the practice of stealing from a chosen target for personal use or redistribution. Through this activity, the group financed various anarchist groups, actions, and publications using the profits from their thefts and armed robberies. During this period, even though they amassed more than 500,000 francs in profits, Pini refused to spend more than twenty-five cents per day for his sustenance. Among the newspapers they funded were the Italian publications Il Ciclone and Il Pugnale. They also published pamphlets, such as Difesa degli anarchici di Chicago e di Duval, a defense of the victims of the Haymarket Square massacre and of Clément Duval, as well as the French publication L'Indicateur anarchiste. They maintained a printing house on rue Bellefond, which they used to publish their works.

The group's members allegedly stabbed an Italian police informant named Farina in Paris. Meanwhile, Pini gained notoriety, and a legend began to form around him due to his numerous thefts and robberies—so much so that he later became the archetype of the 'born criminal' in Cesare Lombroso's racialist theories. In 1888–1889, Placide Schouppe and Pini carried out an important series of robberies together, reselling the stolen goods in London through Marroco.

==== Conflicts with Amilcare Cipriani and Mirandola stabbing ====
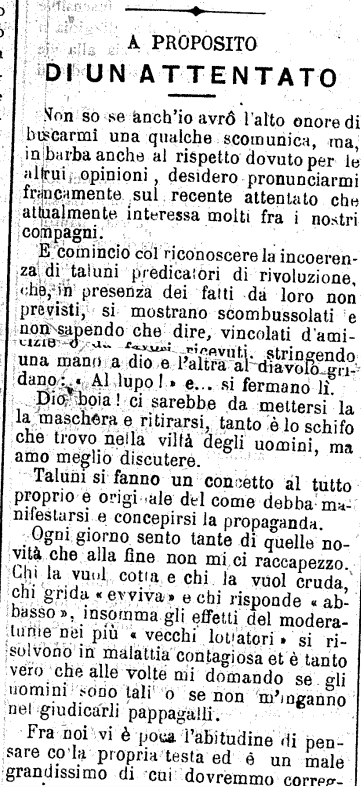
Reaction and defense of the Mirandola stabbing in Il Pugnale, a newspaper published by the Intransigents and of whom Pini was one of the main editors (April 1889)

During the publication of their Manifesto degl' anarchici in lingua italiana al popolo d'Italia, Pini and Parmeggiani fiercely attacked Amilcare Cipriani's stance in favor of a 'Latin peoples' union', which sought to unite Italians and French, among others—a way for Cipriani to counter Italy's anti-French policy at the time. This position was strongly rejected by the two Italian militants, who accused Cipriani of holding nationalist views and opposed the concept of the fatherland in favor of social revolution. They argued that instead of merely seeking a union of 'Latin' peoples, Cipriani should instead promote an association of both 'Latin' and 'Germanic' workers to fight against capitalism together.

Two Italian socialist newspapers, Il Sole dell'Avvenire, run in Mirandola by socialist deputy Celso Ceretti, and La Giustizia, published in Reggio by socialist deputy Camillo Prampolini, responded to these attacks by accusing Pini and Parmeggiani of being police informants and agents provocateurs. This accusation deeply angered the group's members, prompting them to travel to Italy.

There, on 13 February 1889, they carried out the Mirandola stabbing, attempting to assassinate Ceretti, but he survived. Three days later, they were in Reggio, prepared to act again, when they were identified by the Italian police, who attempted to arrest them. Pini and Parmeggiani managed to escape after engaging in a shootout with the police. Pini returned to France, while Parmeggiani fled back to the United Kingdom.

==== Trial of Pini and debate on revolutionary banditry ====
Pini was raided and arrested on 18 June 1889 by the French police when they discovered burglary tools and the proceeds of numerous thefts in his possession. He was subsequently put on trial on 4 and 5 November 1889. It is possible that he was denounced by one Carlo Terzaghi.

During his trial, he theorized the practice of individual reclamation, defending it on four grounds: it would directly address economic inequalities through force, terrorize the bourgeoisie, pedagogically convey anarchist ideas about property, and finally, prepare and incite the population to rise up and lead the Revolution. He argued that all his acts of banditry were political and that he viewed revolutionary banditry as the primary method for achieving social revolution.

His arrest and trial sparked a major debate within anarchist circles regarding the legitimacy of revolutionary banditry, the emerging ideology of illegalism, and the practice of individual reclamation. While some anarchists agreed with the ideology developed by the Intransigents, others were skeptical or outright opposed. Francesco Saverio Merlino, for instance, viewed these practices as either useless or selfish—questioning both the self-serving nature of how some illegalists used the proceeds of their thefts and the broader social impact of such actions. He argued that carrying out a series of isolated, individual acts could not bring about systemic change, which needed to be pursued on a broader scale.

Pini was sentenced to 20 years of deportation to a penal colony, where he died after attempting to escape with Placide Schouppe.

==== Later years and end of activities ====
While Pini was arrested, Parmeggiani was also apprehended in London. The British authorities had to determine whether they would accept Italy's extradition request to try him for the attempted assassination of Ceretti. However, Ceretti refused to travel to formally identify the anarchist, leading the British justice system to deny the extradition and release Parmeggiani.

In the following years, he continued his robberies and authored anarchist publications for some time. Among his writings, he criticized May Day demonstrations as futile and merely reassuring to the bourgeoisie. He also rejected the anarchist terrorism of the Era of Attacks (1892–1894), advocating instead for individual reclamation. On this subject, he wrote :

Will you see your way clear henceforth? And if you want something more than a fruitless revolution, do you feel the small value of the poniard and dynamite in comparison with the arm of expropriation with which nature has equally endowed all of us? [...] Therefore, we say: away with your nonsensical talk and your speeches, echoed a thousand times. Attack individually, unceasingly, common understanding and property, under whatever form you find it, according to your strength and capacity.

However, Parmeggiani did not have the same relationship with the spoils of his thefts as Pini. In the following years, he gradually abandoned the anarchist struggle, amassed wealth, and was even accused—possibly with merit—of having turned into an informant for the British police. He later broke definitively with anarchism.

== Legacy ==
=== Birth of illegalism ===
Clément Duval—who was not a member of the group—and the Intransigents were at the origin of the illegalist tendency within anarchism, both for theoretical and practical reasons. Thus, by the early 1890s, the group was regarded by the French police as the source of a series of illegalist organizations or groups. The practice of illegalism continued, particularly within the anarchist movement in France, until the Bonnot Gang.

== Bibliography ==
- Bouhey, Vivien (2009), Les Anarchistes contre la République [The Anarchists against the Republic], Rennes: Presses universitaires de Rennes (PUR)
- Dipaola, Paolo (2004), Italian anarchists in London (1870-1914) (PhD thesis), London: University of London (GC), p. 278
- Jourdain, Edouard (2013). L'anarchisme [Anarchism]. Paris: La Découverte. ISBN 978-2-7071-9091-8.
- Parry, Richard (1987), The Bonnot gang, Rebel Press, ISBN 978-0-946061-04-4
- Ward, Colin (2004). Anarchism: A Very Short Introduction. Oxford University Press (OUP).
