= Vittorio Pini =

Italian anarchist (1859–1903)

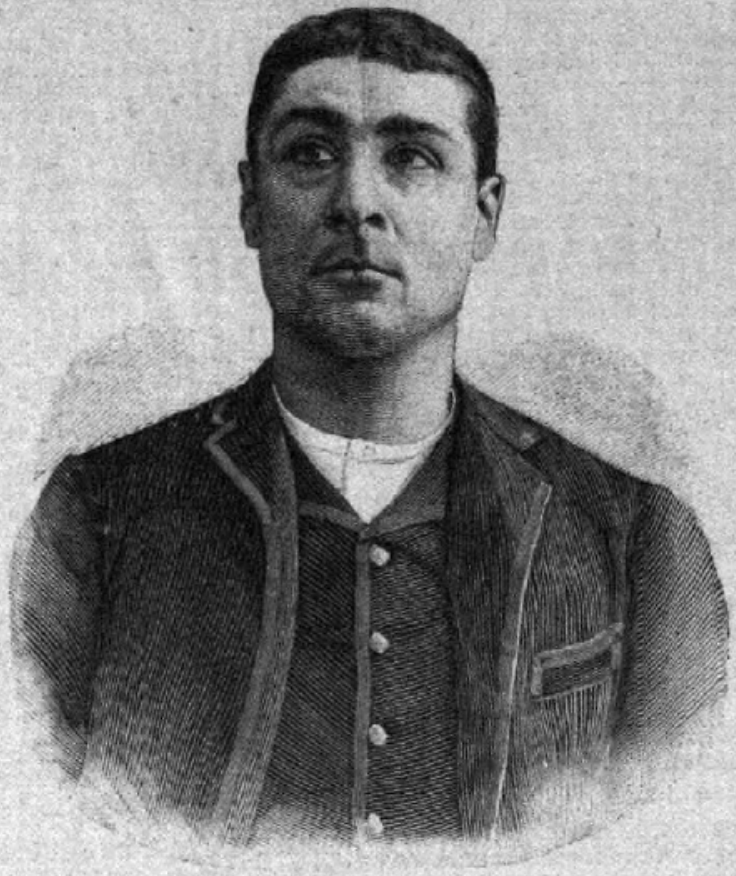
Vittorio Pini

Vittorio Pini (20 August 1859 – 8 June 1903) was an Italian worker, activist, and theorist of individualist and illegalist anarchism. Having arrived in France during the 1880s, he was, alongside Clément Duval, one of the first anarchists to develop illegalism there. Engaged in a series of robberies and thefts with the group he founded, the Intransigents, he led a frugal life and used the proceeds of his crimes to support anarchist groups, newspapers, and printing presses.

His arrest by the French police triggered intense debates within the anarchist movement in France, which was then divided over the legitimacy of emerging illegalism. While historical figures such as Jean Grave initially refused to support this new form of militancy, Pini theorized it during his trial, presenting individual reappropriation as legitimate for four main reasons: to resolve economic inequalities directly through force, to terrorize the bourgeoisie, to pedagogically transmit anarchist ideas on property, and finally, to prepare and incite the population to rise up for the revolution.

The group he founded later influenced several illegalist associations. He was sentenced to 20 years of imprisonment and deported to the penal colony of Cayenne, from which he attempted to escape twice, once with Placide Schouppe that nearly succeeded, before being recaptured and eventually dying there.

== Biography ==
=== Youth and militantism ===
Vittorio Achillo Pini was born in Reggio Emilia on 20 August 1859. His mother was named Anna Marzucchi, while his father, Mauro Marzucchi, was a Garibaldian volunteer. One of his grandfathers was hanged in 1831 for conspiring against the government. He grew up in poverty, and several of his brothers died from poverty during his youth. Pini had to start working as a typographer at the age of twelve to support his family. There, he joined the printing house of an Italian republican newspaper and became politically engaged on the left through reading this journal.

He joined the First International before moving to Milan, where he participated in a six-month strike with the city's typographers. The strike ultimately failed, convincing him that this method would not succeed. During this period, he worked as a firefighter and once saved a family from a burning building while on duty. In his youth, Pini also frequented anarchist and revolutionary circles in Rome, as evidenced by his later encounters in France with several companions from these circles, including his friend Sante Magrini.

=== Western Europe, founding illegalism ===
He left Italy in 1886 after being sentenced to two years in prison for assaulting Baron Franchetti, a wealthy landowner who had attempted to force farmers to vote for him. Passing through Switzerland, he arrived in Paris, where he founded the group of the Intransigents with Luigi Parmeggiani, Caio Zavoli, and Alessandro Marroco.

This group quickly engaged in a series of robberies and thefts, being among the first to develop the ideology of revolutionary banditry, using London and Belgium as their rear bases. The revolutionaries used the money obtained from these actions to finance newspapers and anarchist organizations. Despite earning over 500,000 francs through various activities, Pini personally never kept more than twenty-five cents per day for his own sustenance. The rest of the funds were allocated to printing houses, including the one he established, or to anarchist groups.

This group became the foundation for several later illegalist anarchist associations, attracting figures such as Charles Malato and Errico Malatesta. The French police described these networks in the early 1890s as follows:

Previously, it was led by Pini, Duval, and the Schouppe brothers. Then it recruited Gallau [...] Matthieu Gustave, etc... At present, the most notorious members of the gang are the Italians Malato, Malatesta, Merlino, Pommati, the Magrini brothers; and the Frenchmen Mollet, Capp or Kapp [...]. These individuals are themselves connected in Paris with Weil, Lapie, Cluzel, Millet, Vinchon, and others [...]. The most audacious robberies committed recently in Paris are their work.

During this period, he was convicted three times by the French justice system:

- 19 October 1886: 2 months in prison for fraud.
- 26 January 1887: 13 months in prison for breach of trust.
- 4 July 1887: 4 months in prison for assault and battery.

He fled to Belgium after the Berthe bombing, for which he was suspected. There, he fell into such extreme poverty that he could not eat for days and eventually collapsed in a Brussels cabaret. He was subsequently hospitalized and later imprisoned by the Belgian police, who had to determine whether he could be extradited to France, where he was accused of a diamond theft. However, he managed to prove that at the time of the theft, he was still a firefighter in Milan and had not yet emigrated. As a result, Belgian authorities refused extradition and instead issued an expulsion order, after which he traveled to London.

=== Conflicts with Amilcare Cipriani and Mirandola stabbing ===
During the publication of their Manifesto degl' anarchici in lingua italiana al popolo d’Italia, Pini and Parmeggiani fiercely attacked Amilcare Cipriani’s stance in favor of a 'Latin peoples' union', which sought to unite Italians and French, among others—a way for Cipriani to counter Italy's anti-French policy at the time. This position was strongly rejected by the two Italian militants, who accused Cipriani of holding nationalist views and opposed the concept of the fatherland in favor of social revolution. They argued that instead of merely seeking a union of 'Latin' peoples, Cipriani should instead promote an association of both 'Latin' and 'Germanic' workers to fight against capitalism together.Two Italian socialist newspapers, Il Sole dell’Avvenire, run in Mirandola by socialist deputy Celso Ceretti, and La Giustizia, published in Reggio by socialist deputy Camillo Prampolini, responded to these attacks by accusing Pini and Parmeggiani of being police informants and agents provocateurs. This accusation deeply angered the group's members, prompting them to travel to Italy.

There, on 13 February 1889, they carried out the Mirandola stabbing, attempting to assassinate Ceretti, but he survived. Three days later, they were in Reggio, prepared to act again, when they were identified by the Italian police, who attempted to arrest them. Pini and Parmeggiani managed to escape after engaging in a shootout with the police. Pini returned to France, while Parmeggiani fled back to the United Kingdom.

=== Trial and deportation ===
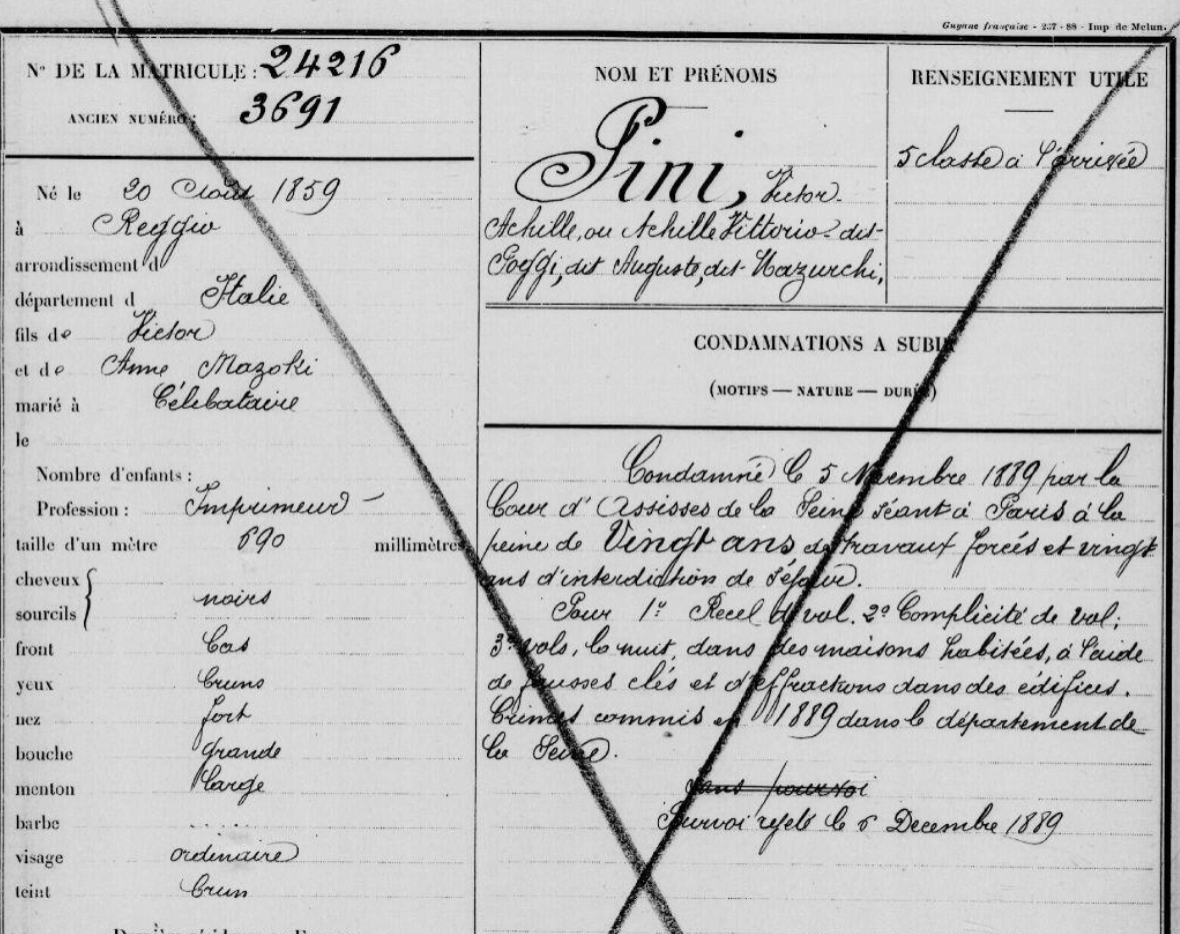
Convict record of Vittorio Pini, sentenced to deportation to the bagne (penal colony) in 1889.

On 18 June 1889, after a denunciation, his home was raided by the French police and he was subsequently arrested when they discovered burglary tools and stolen goods there. He was subsequently put on trial on 4 and 5 November 1889. Pierre Martinet - future founder of individualist anarchism - wrote to offer his services as defense counsel for his friend. The judge denied this request.

During the trial, Pini theorized the practice of 'individual reclamation' for four main reasons: To directly correct economic inequalities through force, to terrorize the bourgeoisie, to pedagogically convey anarchist ideas about property, to prepare and incite the population to rise up and carry out the Revolution. His trial created a rift among anarchists in France. Established figures in the movement, such as Jean Grave, editor-in-chief of Le Révolté, initially refused to consider this new form of anarchist activism—illegalism—as legitimate. Grave's stance was viewed as authoritarian and mistaken by several militants, something noted by a police informant, who reported:

There is much discontent with Grave and especially Méreau, the manager. [of the Le Révolté newspaper]

The trials of Pini and Clément Duval gave rise to the notion of 'bandit justice', a practice that would persist in French anarchist circles up until the Bonnot Gang. Jean-Marc Delpech observed that, like other anarchists of his time—Duval and Émile Henry—Pini fully assumed responsibility for his actions during the trial. He declared:

It is with full awareness of fulfilling a duty that we attack property. […] I do not blush at your accusations, and I take great pleasure in being called a thief by you.

His arrest and trial sparked a major debate within anarchist circles regarding the legitimacy of revolutionary banditry, the emerging ideology of illegalism, and the practice of individual reclamation. While some anarchists agreed with the ideology developed by the Intransigents and Pini, others were skeptical or outright opposed. Francesco Saverio Merlino, for instance, viewed these practices as either useless or selfish—questioning both the self-serving nature of how some illegalists used the proceeds of their thefts and the broader social impact of such actions. He argued that carrying out a series of isolated, individual acts could not bring about systemic change, which needed to be pursued on a broader scale.

He was sentenced to 20 years of penal labor and responded to the sentence by exclaiming:

Long live anarchy! Down with the thieves!

Before his transfer to the penal colony of Cayenne on 15 August 1890, he attempted an escape but failed. At the penal colony, he met and befriended Clément Duval. The following year, alongside Placide Schouppe, he successfully escaped, traveling up the Maroni river in a canoe. They then attempted to cross into Venezuela on foot, but Pini had to stop due to severe swelling in his feet. While he was painting a boat, the Dutch army arrested them and sent them back to the penal colony.

Pini died in the penal colony of Cayenne on 8 June 1903.

== Legacy ==
=== Legend ===
The series of sensational robberies undertaken by Pini made him famous. Thus, he was used as the model of the 'born criminal' in the racialist theories of the Italian criminologist Cesare Lombroso.

=== Historiography ===
Jean Grave depicted Pini and the Intransigents in a highly negative light, writing about them:

It was only later that I learned that, associated with the Schouppe brothers, Pini and Parmeggiani formed a gang of burglars whose operations amounted to hundreds of thousands of francs.

The Schouppes, it seems, prided themselves on being anarchists, but in reality, they were nothing more than pleasure-seekers and common thieves. I never heard that even the slightest portion of their fruitful thefts went to any propaganda work. Yet, I was well-placed to learn many things, even those meant to remain secret.

As for Pini, his admirers extolled his generosity, proclaiming far and wide the sums he supposedly spent on propaganda, but I have yet to find the works he and Parmeggiani subsidized. The five posters—more personal discussions than actual propaganda—and the issue of Il Ciclone are all I know to their credit in terms of propaganda.

However, this portrayal by Grave was later challenged by historian Jean Maitron, who, after studying Pini's life, found no reason to doubt the sincerity of his anarchist convictions.

== Works ==
- Il Pugnale ('The Dagger'), 2 issues in April and August 1889 (he was already arrested at the time of the 2nd issue). In Italian on Wikisource.

== See also ==
- Propaganda of the deed

== Bibliography ==
- Bouhey, Vivien (2009), Les Anarchistes contre la République [The Anarchists against the Republic], Rennes: Presses universitaires de Rennes (PUR)
- Delpech, Jean-Marc (2006), Parcours et réseaux d'un anarchiste : Alexandre Marius Jacob : 1879-1954 (PhD thesis) [The life and networks of an anarchist: Alexandre Marius Jacob: 1879-1954] (PDF), Nancy: Université de Nancy 2
- Dipaola, Paolo (2004), Italian anarchists in London (1870-1914) (PhD thesis), London: University of London (GC), p. 278
- Parry, Richard (1987), The Bonnot gang, Rebel Press, ISBN 978-0-946061-04-4
