= Glossary of anarchism =

The following is a list of terms specific to anarchists. Anarchism is a political and social movement which advocates voluntary association in opposition to authoritarianism and hierarchy.

== A ==
Acracy

The negation of rule or "government by none". While "anarchy" refers to the absence of a hierarchical society-organizing power principle, "acracy" refers to the absence of coercion; the condition of acracy is one of voluntary order. Derived from the Greek α- [no] and κρατία [system of government].

Adhocracy

A form of organic organization according to which different parts of an organization are temporarily assembled to meet the requirements of that particular point in time.

Affinity group

A small non-hierarchical collective of individuals who collaborate on direct action via consensus decision-making.

Anarch

Coined by Ernst Jünger, this refers to the ruler (i.e. individual) in a state of anarchy analogous to the monarch in a state of monarchy, a conception influenced by Max Stirner's notion of the sovereign individual.

Anarchism without adjectives

A form of anarchism which does not declare affiliation with any specific subtype of anarchism (as may be suffixed to anarcho- or anarcha-), instead positioning itself as pluralistic, tolerant of all anarchist schools of thought.

Anarchy

Derived from the Ancient Greek ἀν (without) + ἄρχειν (to rule) "without archons," "without rulers".

Anomie

Social disorder and civil war in an absence of government, used to separate anarchy as in social order and absence of government.

Ansoc

Clipping of anarcho-socialism and/or anarcho-socialist used in informal discourse, particularly in blogs or other internet forums.

Anti-systemic library

A library which is not organised hierarchically and that has no catalogue. The concept is influenced by the ideas of the Situationists.

Autonomism

A set of radical left-wing political movements in Western Europe which emerged in the late 20th century.

Archon

A Greek word meaning "ruler"; the absence of archons and archy (rule) defines a state of anarchy. Derived from the Ancient Greek άρχων, pl. άρχοντες.

== B ==
Biennio rosso

The "two red years" of political agitation, strikes and land occupation by Italian workers in 1919 and 1920.

Black anarchism

A political philosophy primarily of African Americans, opposed to what it sees as the oppression of people of colour by the white ruling class through the power of the state.

Black bloc

An affinity group, or cluster of affinity groups that assembles during protests, demonstrations, or other forms of direct action. Black blocs are noted for the distinctive all-black clothing worn by members to conceal their identity and for their intentional defiance of state property law.

Bourse du Travail

A distinctively French form of working class organization of the late nineteenth and early twentieth centuries, bourses du travail promoted mutual aid, education, and self-organization amongst their members.

== C ==
Companion

A term used to speak about a fellow anarchist, akin to 'comrade' in communism and a former organizational structure of anarchism.

Consensus decision-making

A participatory decision making process for collectives that seeks the resolution or mitigation of minority objections (according to the principle of inclusivity) as well as the agreement of the majority of participants.

Cost the limit of price

A maxim coined by individualist anarchist Josiah Warren (1798–1874) to express a normative conception of the labor theory of value—that is, that the price of a good or service should never exceed its cost.

Counter-economics

Abbreviation of "counter-establishment economics", a concept in agorist theory of the use and advocacy of black and grey markets and the underground economy to erode the moral authority of and the perceived necessity for the state.

== D ==
…When a revolutionary situation develops, counter-institutions have the potential of functioning as a real alternative to the existing structure and reliance on them becomes as normal as reliance on the old authoritarian institutions. This is when counter-institutions constitute dual power.

Dual power is a state of affairs in which people have created institutions that fulfill all the useful functions formerly provided by the state. The creation of a general state of dual power is a necessary requirement for a successful revolution…

— Love and Rage Revolutionary Anarchist Federation New York Local Member Handbook; June, 1997.

Dispute resolution organization (DRO)

A private (or possibly cooperative) organization specialized in resolving disputes that would arise in an anarchical society (similar to a PDA).

Diversity of tactics
A united front of solidarity between participants who disagree on specific choice of tactics. For instance, during a protest action, demonstrators can create zones with varying degrees of tactical risk, rather than imposing a single code.
Dual power

The concept of revolution through the creation of "counter-institutions" in place of and in opposition to state power. Used in anarcho-communist discourse, it is distinct from the earlier use of the phrase by non-anarchist communists such as Vladimir Lenin.

Dumpster diving

Physically searching through the discarded belongings in a dumpster or other trash receptacle, with the intention of salvaging useful material such as food or information.

== E ==
Epistemological anarchism

A theory in the philosophy of science advanced by Paul Feyerabend which holds that there are no useful and exception-free rules governing the progress of science, and that the pragmatic approach is a Dadaistic "anything goes" attitude of methodological pluralism.

== F ==
Food rescue

The practice of retrieving edible food that would otherwise go to waste and distributing it to those in need.

Free school

A decentralized network in which skills, information and knowledge are shared with neither the social hierarchy nor the institutional environment of formal schooling.

Free soviets

Following the Russian Revolution, the concept of workers' councils (soviets) that were self-governing and free from party control.

Freeganism

An anti-consumerist lifestyle according to which participants attempt to restrict their consumption of natural resources and participation in the conventional economy to using salvaged and discarded goods.

Freigeld

A monetary system in the Freiwirtschaft theory, according to which units of currency retain their value or lose it at a certain rate, making inflation and profiting from interest impossible. Freigeld is a German phrase with the literal meaning "free money".

== G ==
Give-away shop

Second-hand stores where all goods are free. An example of a gift economy.

Guerrilla gardening

Nonviolent direct action whereby disused plots are converted to gardens without seeking the permission of the putative property owners. Related: squatting.

== H ==
Haymarket Martyrs

The seven anarchists tried and executed for the murder of a Chicago policeman during the Haymarket affair.

Haymarket Tragedy

See Haymarket Martyrs

Hierarchy

See social hierarchy

Horizontalidad (also Horizontalism)

A form of non-hierarchical social organization which utilises direct democracy and consensus decision-making.

== I ==
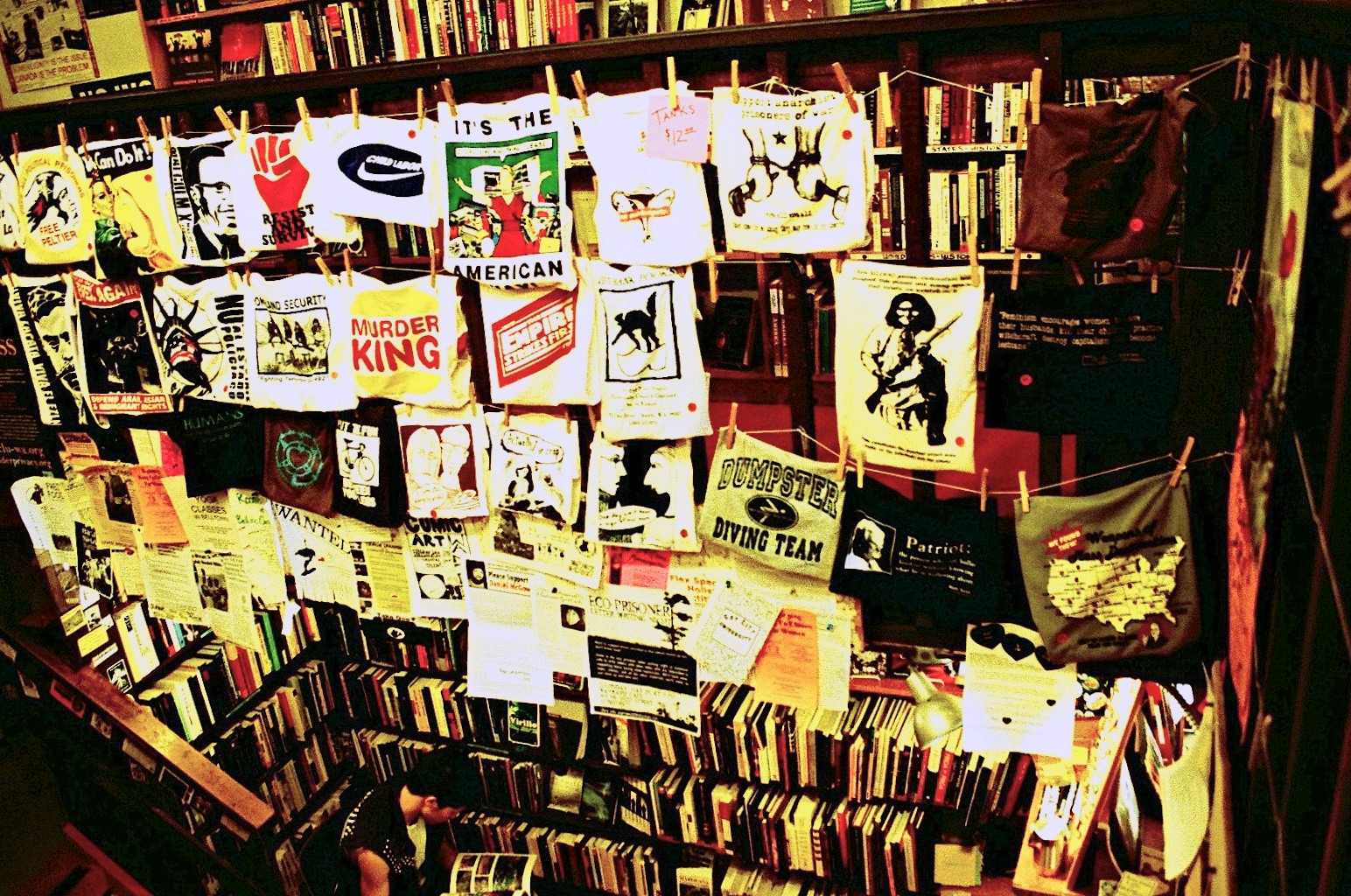
Interior of the Left Bank Books infoshop in Seattle, Washington, in 2006. An infoshop is a nexus for information exchange among anarchists.

Illegalism

A doctrine which rejects all moral obligations and governmental law in favour of the satisfaction of one's own desires. Pioneered by the Bonnot Gang in France and heavily influenced by the individualist anarchist philosophy of Max Stirner.

Immediatism

A philosophy which demands the embracing of immediate social interactions with people as a means of countering the antisocial consequences of consumerist capitalism.

Individual reclamation (reprise individuelle)
The idea that, given that capitalists steal from individuals and the people, it would be legitimate to steal from them in return. This was theorized by Clément Duval and Vittorio Pini and serves as the ideological foundation for the illegalist tendency.
Infoshop

A space (often a social center) that serves as a node for anarchists involved with radical movements and countercultures for trading publications (typically books, zines, stickers and posters), meeting and networking with similar individuals and groups. The primary directive of an infoshop is the dissemination of information. Related: zine library.

Invisible dictatorship

A vanguardist organisation of revolutionaries first proposed by Mikhail Bakunin.

== J ==
Jurisdictional arbitrage

Exploitation of differences in national laws and regulations to maximise liberty. Related: dynamic geography, panarchism.

== K ==
Kabouters

Dutch anarchists influenced by Peter Kropotkin who sought to promote awareness of alternatives to authoritarian and capitalist solutions to social problems in 1960s Amsterdam.

== L ==
Land and liberty

A slogan expressing the desire of freedom from landowners originally used by the revolutionary leaders of the Mexican Revolution. Spanish: Tierra y Libertad, Russian: Земля и Воля Zemlya i Volya.

Law of equal liberty

A doctrine asserting that each individual has the right to assert their fullest liberty to act so long as it does not extend them greater liberty than any other individual. Named by Herbert Spencer.

Lifestylism
Anarchists who prioritize cultural and identity protest over class struggle politics. Associated with Murray Bookchin's 1995 essay in pejorative reference to anarcho-primitivists, poststructural anarchists, and individualists/egoists.
Lois scélérates

A pejorative term for a set of French laws passed during 1893–1894 restricting the freedom of the anarchist press in the aftermath of an outbreak of propaganda of the deed.

== M ==
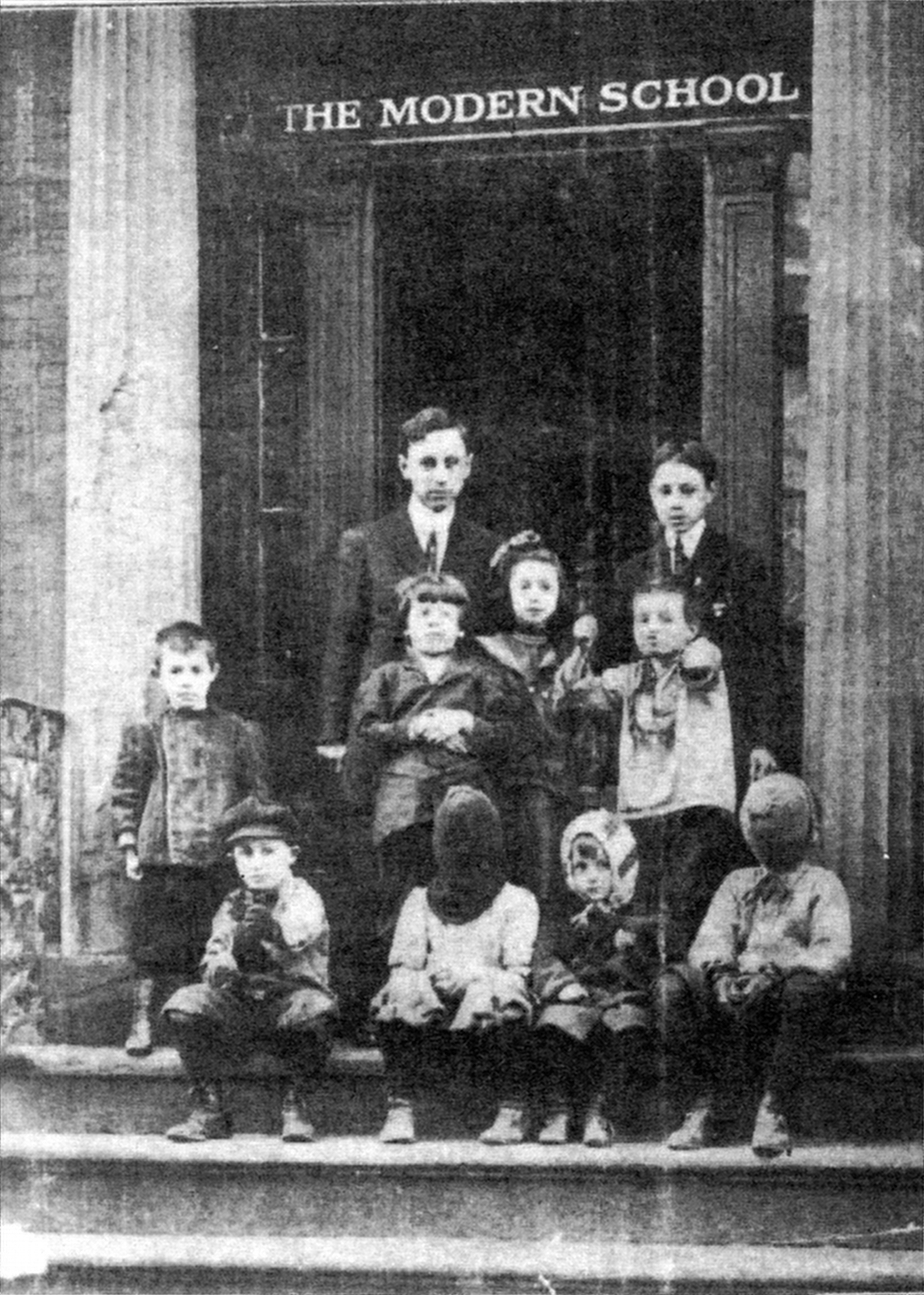
The Modern School in New York City, circa 1911–12. Anarchist philosopher and radical historian Will Durant stands on the steps with his pupils.

Makhnovshchina

Mass movement to establish anarchist-communism in Ukraine, led by the Ukrainian anarchist revolutionary Nestor Makhno (1888–1934) and his followers in the Revolutionary Insurgent Army of Ukraine.

Modern School

American schools formed in the early 20th century based on the ideas of educator and anarchist Francesc Ferrer i Guàrdia and modelled after his Escuela Moderna.

Mutual aid

The voluntary reciprocal exchange of resources and services for mutual benefit. Related: gift economy, voluntarism.

== N ==
Netwar

Low-intensity social conflict employing a network structure for organisational control and communication. Related: Security culture.

== P ==
Panarchy (political philosophy)

Participatory politics

Polycentric law

Popular assembly

Post-left

Prefigurative politics

Primitivist

Used interchangeably with anarcho-primitivist.

Propaganda of the deed

Property is theft!

Provo

Punk house

== R ==
Radical cheerleading

Really Really Free Market

A free market based on the principle of gift economics whereby participants bring gifts and resources to share with one another, without money being exchanged. Related: participatory economics, voluntary association.

Refusal of work

Responsible autonomy

Revolutionary spontaneity

Rewilding

Reprise individuelle

== S ==
Samizdat—the production of literature banned by the former communist governments of eastern Europe; the term is a play on the term for the Soviet state press, and translates to "self-publishing." Throughout the greater part of the twentieth century, the best literature, philosophy, and history in the Soviet Union and its satellite states was copied by photo-reproduction and distributed through underground channels—just as it is here in the United States today.

— Rolling Thunder, Issue 4

Seasteading

The creation of permanent dwellings on the ocean, analogous to homesteading on land. A seastead is a structure meant for permanent occupation on the ocean.

Security culture

Secrecy practiced by an affinity group which engages in illegal activities, and its precautions to avoid surveillance or infiltration by law enforcement. Related: direct action, netwar

Social center

Social ecology

Social hierarchy

Social revolution

Somatherapy

Spokescouncil

Spontaneous order

Street reclamation

Swaraj

== T ==
TANSTAAFL

Acronym coined by libertarian science fiction writer Robert A. Heinlein in The Moon Is a Harsh Mistress for "There Ain't No Such Thing As A Free Lunch". Used to express scepticism towards socialist economics.

Tragic Week

The name given to a series of violent confrontations between the Spanish army and the anarchist-backed working classes in Catalunyan cities from July 25-August 2, 1909.

Trial of the thirty

A show trial in 1894 in Paris aimed at legitimizing the lois scélérates passed in 1893–1894 against the French anarchist movement and at restricting press freedom by proving the existence of an effective association between anarchists. French: Procès des trente

== V ==
Veganarchism

The political philosophy of veganism (more specifically animal liberation) and anarchism, creating a combined praxis as a means for social revolution.

Voluntarism

The use of or reliance on voluntary action to maintain an institution, carry out a policy, or achieve an end.

Voluntaryism

A political philosophy which advocates voluntary association as the foundation of society, and opposes coercion and aggression.

== W ==
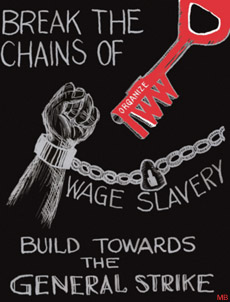
The abolition of wage slavery has been a stated goal of unions like the Industrial Workers of the World.

Wage slavery

A term which asserts a similarity between slavery—the ownership and control of one person by another—and wage labour.

Workers' self-management

A form of workplace decision-making in which the workers rather than professional managers decide on issues related to the operation of the business.

== Z ==
Zenarchy

Compound of zen and "archy". The social order which arises from meditation. As a doctrine, zenarchism is the belief that "universal enlightenment" is a prerequisite to the abolition of the state.

Zine

A low-circulation, non-commercial periodical of original or appropriated texts and images. Usually reproduced via photocopier on a variety of colored paper stock.

Zine library

A repository of zines and other associated artifacts, such as small press books. Zine libraries are typically run on a minimal budget, and have a close association with infoshops and other forms of DIY culture and independent media.

== See also ==
- List of basic anarchism topics

== Bibliography ==
- Bouhey, Vivien (2008), Les Anarchistes contre la République [The Anarchists against the Republic], Rennes: Presses universitaires de Rennes (PUR)
