= Clotilde Mabillon =

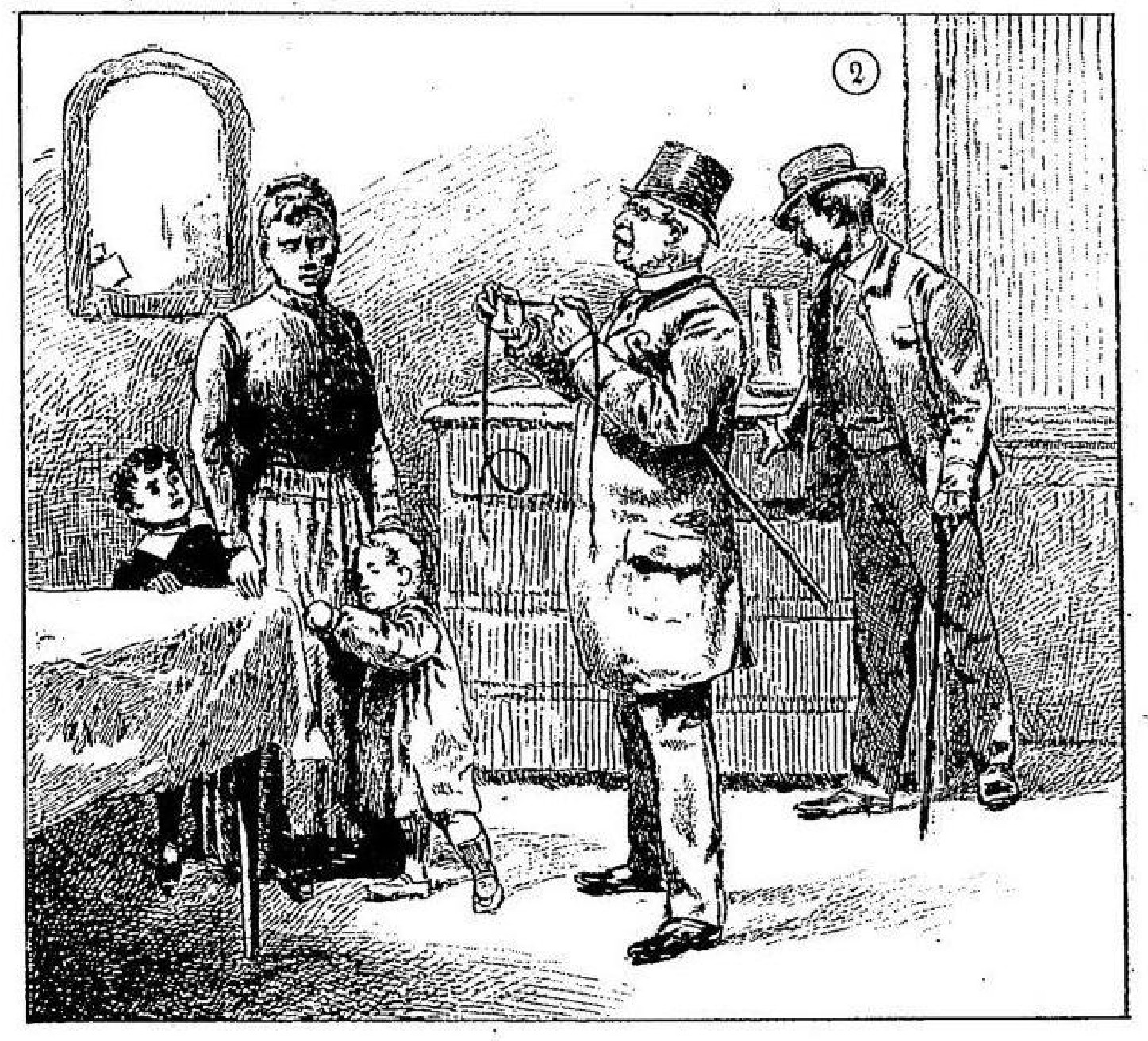
- Mabillon facing police official Clément during the police raid at her home (L'Univers illustré of 2 April 1892)
- Born: Clotilde Louise Mabillon; March 22, 1865; Givors, France
- Died: February 2, 1953 (aged 87); Lagny-sur-Marne, France
- Citizenship: France
- Occupation: Anarchist
- Known for: Organizing and doing the Saint-Germain bombing (11 March 1892)
- Movement: Anarchism
- Spouse: Charles Chaumentin (m. 1884)
- Partner: Ravachol (free love) (1891-1892)

Clotilde Mabillon (22 March 1865 - 2 February 1953) was a French anarchist. She is primarily known for her probable participation in the Saint-Germain bombing, which she appears to have largely organized and led, propelling France into the Ère des attentats (1892–1894). Furthermore, she likely maintained a romantic relationship with Ravachol.

Born into a family of modest means in the Lyon region, Mabillon married Charles Chaumentin in Saint-Étienne in 1884. She moved to Paris with him and settled in Saint-Denis, where she joined the anarchist movement in France and the circles of surrounding towns, which were often young and relatively radical. She associated with several other companions of these circles, particularly Louise Héloin, wife of Henri Decamps. Mabillon witnessed the Fourmies massacre and the Clichy affair, which affected the groups she belonged to and led to severe police brutality against Decamps. At roughly the same time, she entered into a free love relationship with Ravachol, who was then a fugitive for the murder of the hermit of Chambles. Following Decamps' conviction, Mabillon and Chaumentin, aided by Ravachol and surrounded by a circle including, among others, Gustave Mathieu, Charles Simon, Rosalie Soubère, and Joseph Jas-Béala, set in motion a plot to carry out a bombing to assassinate Edmond Benoît, the judge responsible for Decamps' sentencing.

On 11 March 1892, she was likely the person in charge of carrying the explosive pot and handed it over to Ravachol, who then planted it and committed the attack. As the police were entirely unaware of the attack in the first few days, an informant set the authorities on Ravachol's trail after obtaining a confession from Mabillon. From that moment on, the authorities knew whom to look for, tracked the anarchist, and began arresting a series of anarchists in the Paris region, including Mabillon and Chaumentin. She collaborated with the police. Confronted with Ravachol after his arrest, she admitted to being Ravachol's lover, but claimed the man presented to her was not him. Later, confronted with Soubère, she appeared to reach an agreement for the latter to bear responsibility for the attack, the position defended by all the conspirators from that point forward. The authorities, aware of her responsibility, refused to prosecute her, in part to protect their informant and to portray the Chaumentins as responsible for the initial betrayal. She disappeared from the anarchist movement, from which she was immediately expelled.

Mabillon died on 2 February 1953, in Lagny-sur-Marne. Her role in the bombing, initially ignored, has since been re-evaluated by various historians who emphasize her romantic ties to Ravachol and her likely participation in the event.

== Biography ==
=== Youth and marriage ===
Clotilde Louise Mabillon was born on 22 March 1865 in Givors. She was the daughter of Jean Mabillon, a butcher, and Rosalie-Eugénie Claveau, who held no profession. At the age of nineteen, on 1st December 1884, she married Charles Chaumentin in Saint-Étienne, and the two subsequently moved to the Paris region, settling in Saint-Denis.

=== Integration into the anarchist movement (1885?–1890?) ===
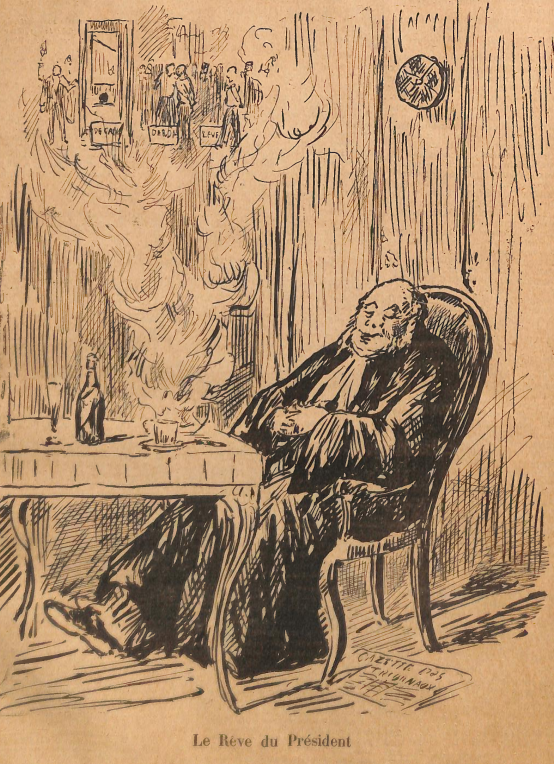
Edmont Benoit's 'The dream of the president' caricature in Le Père Peinard (6 September 1891)

Mabillon joined the anarchist movement between the second half of the 1880s and the early 1890s by becoming a companion. According to police reports concerning her, she was noted in contradictory ways: described both as weak-minded and lacking in character, but also as the driving force behind the couple's politicization, being far more radical than her husband and highly intelligent.

The groups she joined in Saint-Denis and the surrounding areas were characterized by a young, working-class population and were relatively radical, defending ideas such as individual reclamation or propaganda of the deed. In particular, she associated with other companions from these circles, such as Marie Léonie Mécrent, whose husband was Philogone Segard, or Louise Héloin, whose husband was Henri Decamps.

=== The Clichy affair and meeting with Ravachol ===
On 1 May 1891, two simultaneous events occurred on the fringes of International Workers' Day. On one hand, the French army committed the Fourmies massacre, targeting the town's working-class population; on the other, in the northern suburbs of Paris, the circles to which Mabillon belonged were involved in the Clichy affair, a violent clash between anarchists and police followed by significant police brutality against three captured anarchists: Louis Léveillé, Charles Dardare, and Henri Decamps, the husband of Mabillon's friend.

In parallel, Ravachol, who was a fugitive for the murder of the hermit of Chambles, reached Paris, where he was hosted by Mabillon and her husband. According to CEP and Petit, it 'is probable that the two then [maintained] intimate relations in the nature of free love and that Chaumartin [was] aware of, and in agreement with, this relationship'. In August 1891, the defendants in the Clichy affair were sentenced to prison terms despite the violence they had suffered.

Following this conviction, a group appears to have formed around Mabillon and Chaumentin, composed of, among others, Ravachol, Charles Simon (known as Biscuit), Rosalie Soubère, Joseph Jas-Béala, and Gustave Mathieu. This group, or at least a portion of these individuals, organized a plot seeking to assassinate Edmond Benoît, the judge responsible for Decamps' sentencing. According to the two historians, her position within the plot was 'central'.

=== Saint-Germain bombing and legal aftermath ===
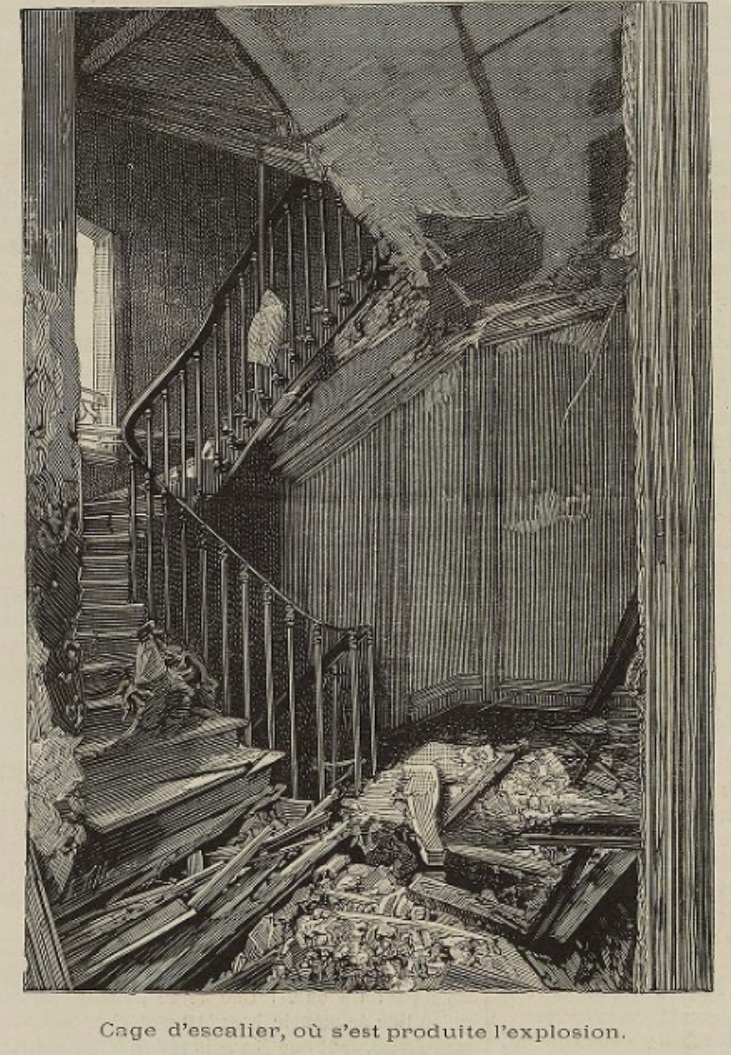
Photographical representation of the aftermath of the Saint Germain bombing in L'Illustration (19 March 1892)

On 11 March 1892, Ravachol and at least one dark-haired woman carrying the bomb went to Benoît's residence and carried out the Saint-Germain bombing. Initially, the police were unaware of the situation, as the perpetrators came from circles that were poorly infiltrated (Ravachol was a fugitive, the women's circle in Saint-Denis had little police presence, etc.). However, a report from informant X2 a few days later put the authorities on the trail of the anarchist. In this 'famous' communication, derived from the unwitting confessions of Mabillon, who was reportedly intoxicated, X2 wrote:

The Saint-Germain bombing was carried out jointly by the aforementioned Chaumartin, his wife, and one of their cousins, known so far only by the first name Léon, residing in Saint-Denis, where the laboratory is presumably located in which the explosives and poisons mentioned in a previous correspondence are manufactured. [...] Léon and Mrs. Chaumartin departed for Paris by tramway : she carried the explosive pot between her legs, hidden under her skirts, to avoid inspection at the city gate. [...] He rejoined Mrs. Chaumartin, who was waiting for him nearby on the boulevard, and barely had they reunited when the explosion occurred.

Shortly thereafter, her home was raided and Chaumentin was arrested. Mabillon opposed the raid by contradicting the police, while her husband, meanwhile, began to collaborate and provide information about the plot. He stated that Mabillon was closer to Ravachol than he was, and that she should be interrogated as a priority, though without being arrested, so that their young children could remain with her. As of the 19th, the information from X2 dried up; she indeed (rightfully) suspected him of having denounced her and refused to speak to him further regarding the bombing.

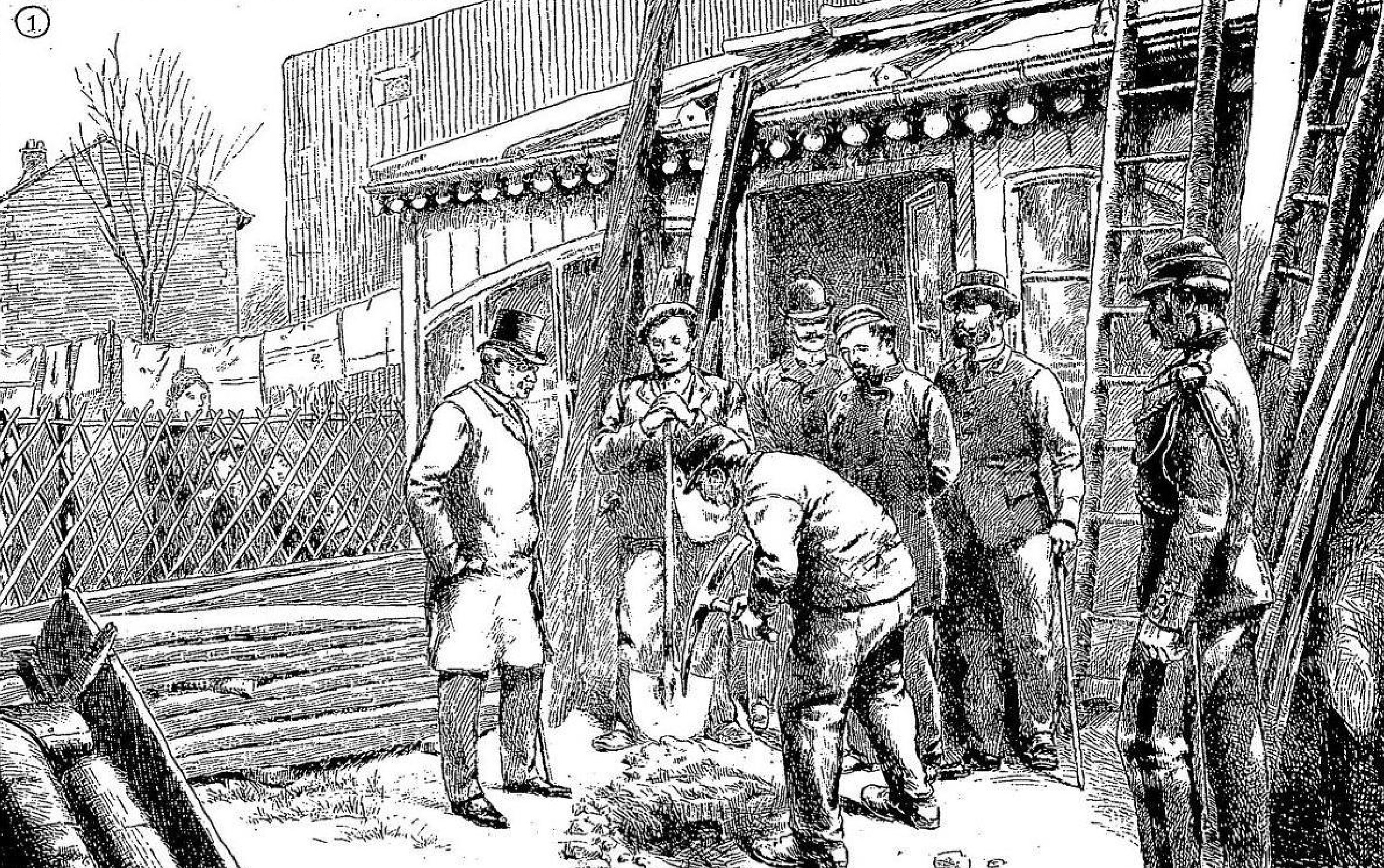
Raids at Mabillon's home in L'Univers Illustré (2 April 1892)

Mabillon was arrested a few days later and spoke to the authorities, partly under pressure from her husband, providing several details of the plot. Following Ravachol's arrest on 30 March, she was brought face-to-face with him; she recanted the information she had previously admitted and refused to recognize the man presented to her. When judge Gaston Laurent-Atthalin interrogated her, suggesting she was Ravachol's mistress, Mabillon admitted to the affair but insisted that, for that very reason, she could personally guarantee this man was not Ravachol. During the same interview, Chaumentin denounced Ravachol, eventually leading the man to admit his true identity.

She was also confronted with Rosalie Soubère (known as Mariette). During this encounter, the two appeared to reach an agreement to shift the responsibility for the bombing onto Soubère, who was not a mother and agreed to sacrifice herself for her co-conspirator. The authorities recognized the maneuver but allowed it to proceed, likely in part to protect X2 by using the Chaumentin couple as a shield, effectively presenting them as the sole source of information provided to the police.

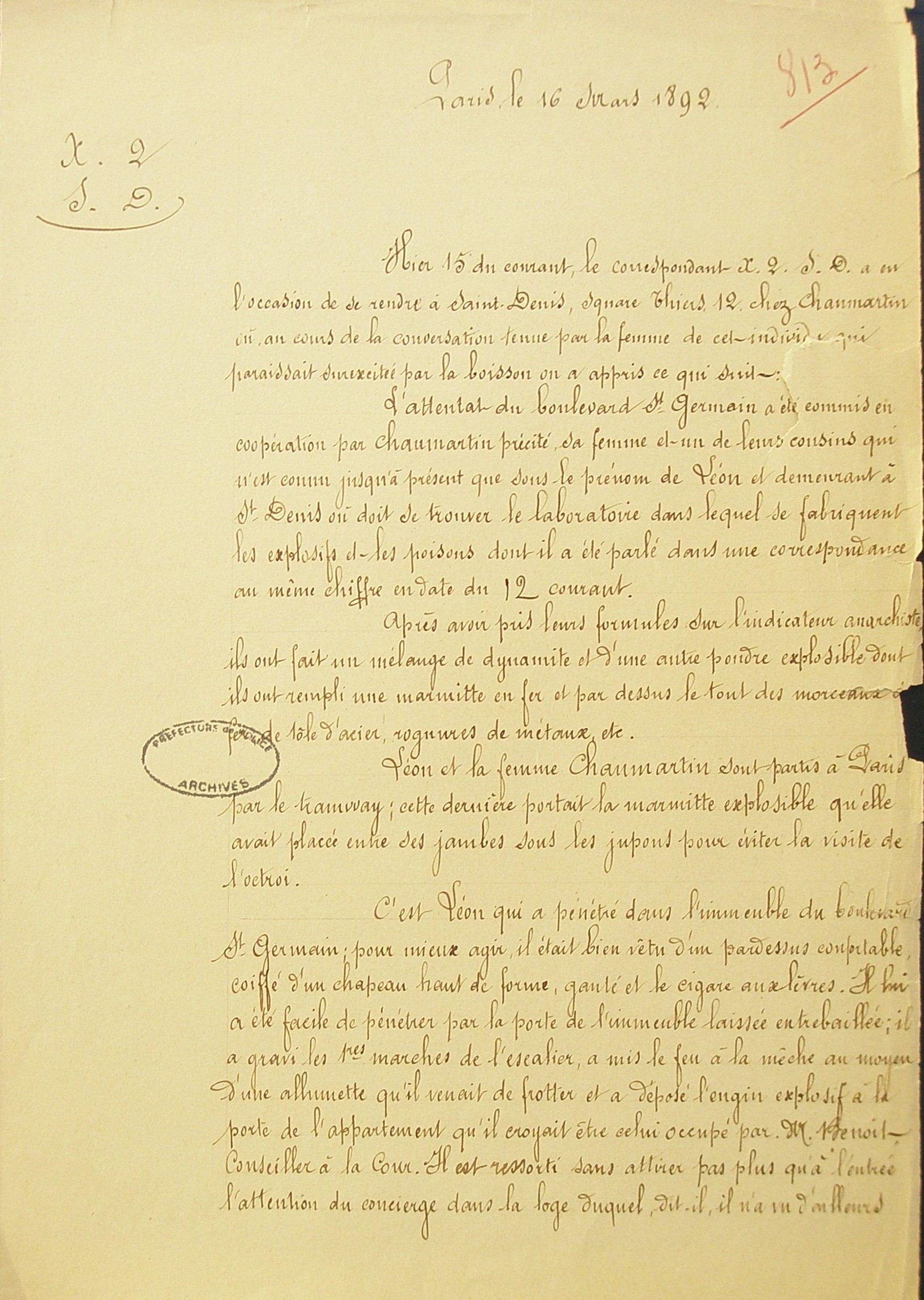
First page of the 'famous' report from X2 regarding Mabillon and Ravachol (collection of Archives anarchistes)

Once she was released and her collaboration with the authorities became known to the companions, she was immediately rejected by the anarchist movement. Along with her husband, she became a target of great hostility due to their treason. When questioned by the French press regarding her relationship with Ravachol, Mabillon gave a lengthy interview to Le Temps, in which she stated, among other things:

How could the rumor have spread that I was Ravachol’s mistress! It is an infamy, mister. [...] Over a thousand anarchists have come to our home, and if I noticed Ravachol a bit more than the others, it was because he taught my two remaining little girls how to read; it was because my husband brought him home more often for lunch or dinner. [...] Think of how many meals I prepared, not just for Ravachol, but for other anarchists as well, who knew my husband earned a good living! [...] Because it didn't always amuse me to cook for all those people. I do not know if Ravachol is as guilty as they say. If he committed all the crimes attributed to him, let justice be done! But while I abandon him as a criminal, I shall always maintain my esteem for him because of the respect he always showed me.

During Ravachol's trial for the bombing, she was not charged but was instead called as a witness for the prosecution. Taking the stand with her four or six-year-old daughter in her arms, Mabillon once again recanted her previous statements, absolving Simon and Béala, while affirming the guilt of Soubère and Ravachol. When the prosecutor, Quesnay de Beaurepaire, asked her if she had received threats or pressure to change her mind, she replied that she had not, leading him to dismiss her in frustration. Later during the hearing, she protested when Quesnay de Beaurepaire argued that she had been the source of her husband's shift toward anarchism.

=== Final years and death ===
As Mabillon was completely rejected by the anarchist movement for her collaboration with the authorities, her situation was dangerous, and she preferred to fade into obscurity. She died on 2 February 1953 in Lagny-sur-Marne.

== Legacy ==
=== Relativization of her testimony for authorities ===
According to Jean Maitron and other historians, the value of the testimony provided by the Mabillon-Chaumentin couple was meager compared to the information X2 supplied to the authorities. Consequently, Maitron considers that the couple's reputation should be 'somewhat rehabilitated'.

=== Growing re-evaluation of her role in the bombing and free love ===
In 2026, historians Dominique Petit and CEP published a biography about her in the Dictionnaire international des militants anarchistes (DIMA). By focusing on this figure, they highlighted that she was in an intimate free love relationship with Ravachol on one hand, and on the other, that she was one of the primary individuals responsible for the bombing. They specifically emphasize the fact that Soubère appeared to take her place to spare her, that the initial reports from X2 were categorical regarding her involvement, and that she matches the description of the female assailant.

Furthermore, the fact that she was in an intimate relationship with Ravachol provides a new perspective on the Saint-Germain bombing, according to them; it suggests motives beyond a purely selfless desire to defend the anarchist movement, pointing also toward a personal vendetta by Ravachol and his group against a magistrate who had sentenced those close to them.

=== Primary sources ===
- Collection of X2 reports on The Anarchist Library (tr. 2025)

== Bibliography ==
- Accoce, Pierre (1998). "« Ils ont eu Sadi Carnot ! »" [They got Sadi Carnot!]. Ces assassins qui ont voulu changer l'Histoire (in French). Paris: Plon. ISBN 978-2259189873.
- Bouhey, Vivien (2008), Les Anarchistes contre la République [The Anarchists against the Republic] (in French), Rennes: Presses universitaires de Rennes (PUR)
- CEP; Petit, Dominique (2026), "MABILLON, Clotilde, Louise [épouse CHAUMENTIN, dit "CHAUMARTIN"]", Dictionnaire international des militants anarchistes, Paris
- Maitron, Jean (1955), Histoire du mouvement anarchiste en France (1800-1914) (in French), Paris: Histoire du mouvement anarchiste en France, 1880-1914
- Merriman, John M. (2016). The dynamite club: how a bombing in fin-de-siècle Paris ignited the age of modern terror. Yale University Press. ISBN 978-0-300-21792-6.
