= Clichy affair =

Police brutality targeting anarchists in France (1891)

Clichy Affair
- Part of Ère des attentats
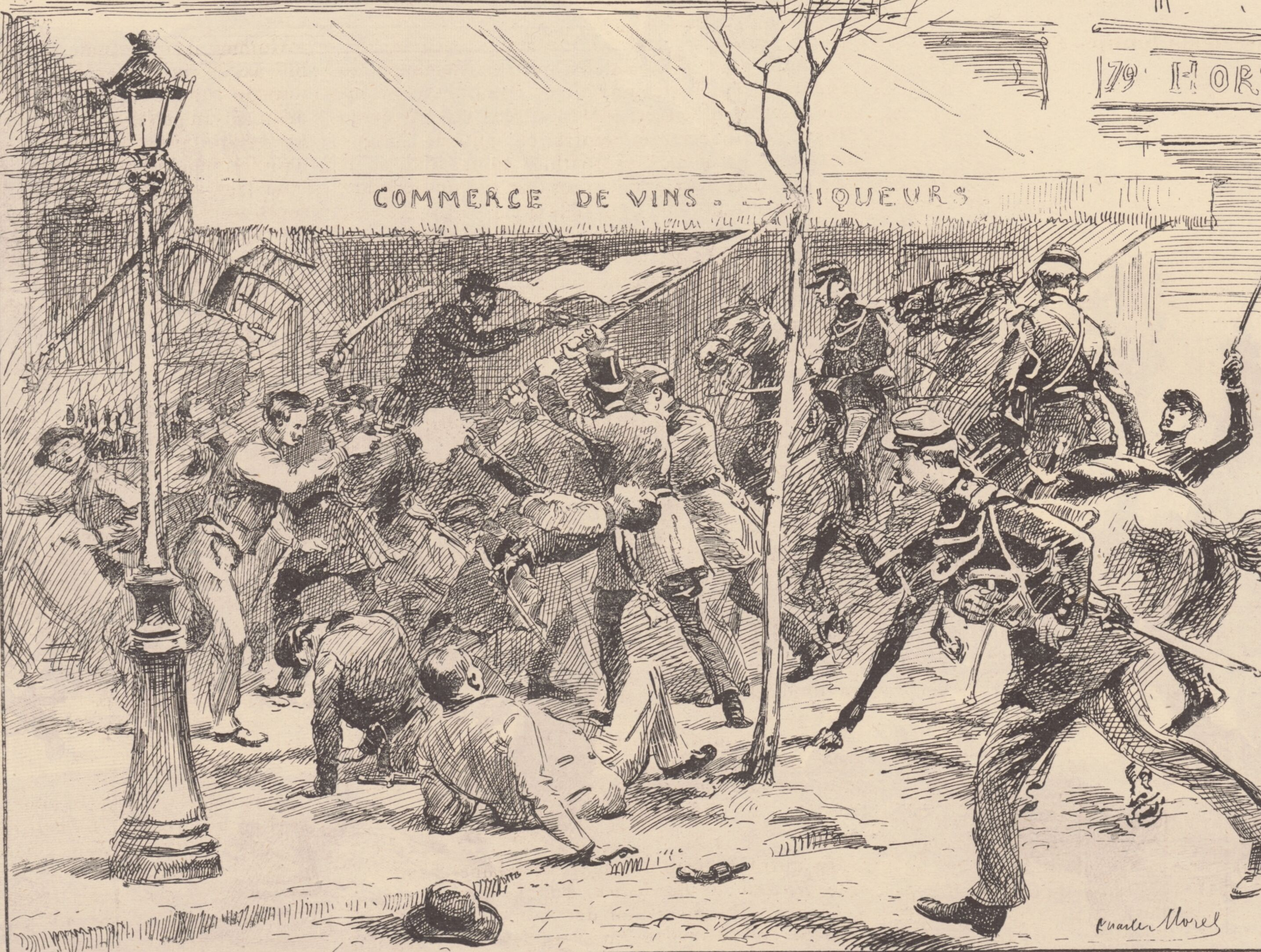
- Representation of the affair in Le Monde Illustré (9 May 1891)
- Date: May 1, 1891
- Location: Clichy, France; 48°54′N 2°18′E
- Goals: retrieving a black flag held by peaceful anarchist demonstrators
- Methods: shooting, police brutality
- Result: Dozens injured, catalyst for the Ère des attentats

Parties
France	Anarchists

Lead figures
	Elvire Serrouin

The Clichy affair was a significant event in the history of anarchism and France, occurring on 1 May 1891 in Clichy, when anarchists were subjected to police brutality. The affair was one of the primary causes of the Ère des attentats (1892–1894). With the Fourmies massacre, happening the same day, it was one of the events of this period where the social tensions reached their peak in France.

Anarchists had faced increasing repression in the preceding decade, and they joined the early International Workers' Day. About twenty of them were peacefully demonstrating between Levallois-Perret and Clichy, preceded by a black flag carried by Elvire Serrouin. The police attempted to seize the flag from her, considering it a "seditious emblem", and a fight ensued, along with a shooting, as the police fired on the demonstrators who were trying to flee. Three of them, Henri Decamps, Charles Dardare, and Louis Léveillé, were arrested and, taken to the police station, were violently beaten by the police; one of the officers even tried to kill Dardare.

During their trial in August 1891, the prosecutor demanded the death penalty for all three. Two of them received very heavy sentences of five and three years in prison, with the police facing no repercussions.

The affair sparked outrage among a segment of French society and deeply shocked anarchists, a number of whom came to support propaganda of the deed methods, or terrorism, to avenge those responsible for their repression. A few months after the conviction of the three anarchists, Ravachol, Mabillon, Chaumentin, Simon, and maybe Soubère, Jas-Béala, and Mathieu carried out the Saint Germain bombing, targeting the judge in charge of the trial.

== History ==
=== Context ===
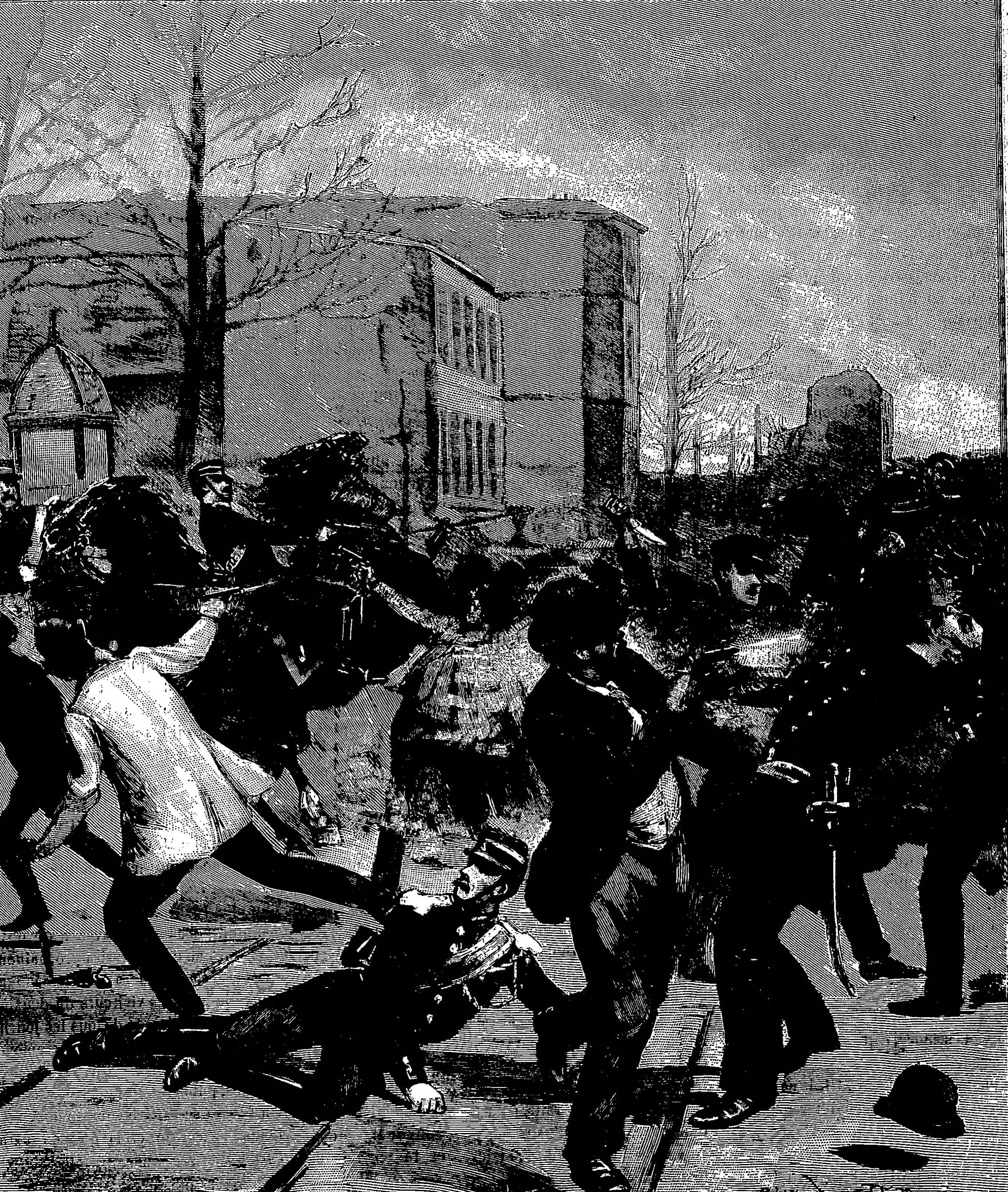
Clichy affair in L'Univers illustré (9 May 1891)

In the 19th century, anarchism emerged and took shape in Europe before spreading. Anarchists advocate for the struggle against all forms of perceived unjust domination, including economic domination, particularly with the rise of capitalism. They are especially opposed to the State, viewed as the institution that sanctions many of these dominations through its police, army, and propaganda.

Following the repression of the Paris Commune (1871), the nascent anarchist movement developed during a period of intense state repression targeting it. Throughout the 1880s in France - and elsewhere, anarchists faced significant state suppression, including increased surveillance, harsher penalties, the banning of their press, and numerous trials targeting them.

Alongside these developments, anarchists debated their participation in May Day demonstrations. These events were initiated by politicians of the Second International but also served as a tribute to the anarchists of the Haymarket Square massacre (1886) and were seen as a way to integrate into demonstrations that could lead to revolution. For most anarchists in France, in the early 1890s, the opportunity was initially met with enthusiasm at first. However, despite the preparations some anarchists made, the police were aware of their plans and implemented a series of countermeasures, which in many cases deterred them from acting.

=== Clichy affair ===
On 1 May 1891 at around 2 P.M., while the army was massacring strikers in Fourmies, a group of about twenty anarchist companions gathered in Place de la République in Levallois Perret, to demonstrate peacefully and head towards Clichy. The group set off, led by Elvire Serrouin carrying a black flag at the front of the procession and she guided the group towards Clichy.

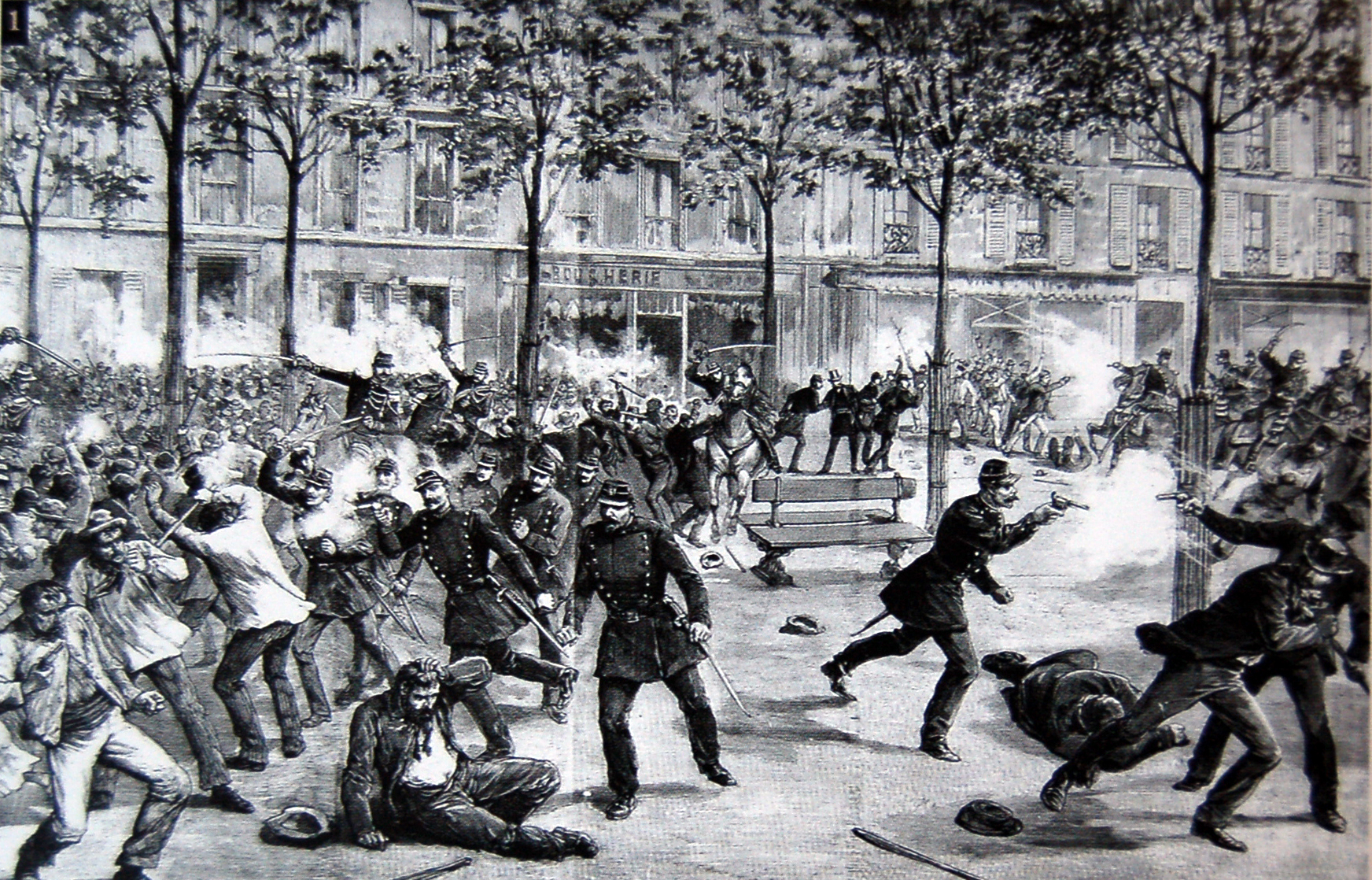
Clichy affair

The police commissaire of Levallois-Perret received news of this demonstration in his district. He then decided to give chase and catch them, along with their "seditious emblems". Three police officers, Dufoulon, Magnier, and Vernier, took a carriage to reach the demonstrators as quickly as possible, while the commissaire and his secretary tried to catch them on foot. According to the head of the Sûreté at the time, Marie-François Goron, the Clichy commissaire had been informed that the demonstrators had just entered his district from Levallois-Perret – he was told that the anarchists had rolled up the flag and were retreating to a wine merchant's – and he decided not to intervene on the advice of his deputy, who declared that the flag, moreover rolled up, did not constitute a danger to public order.

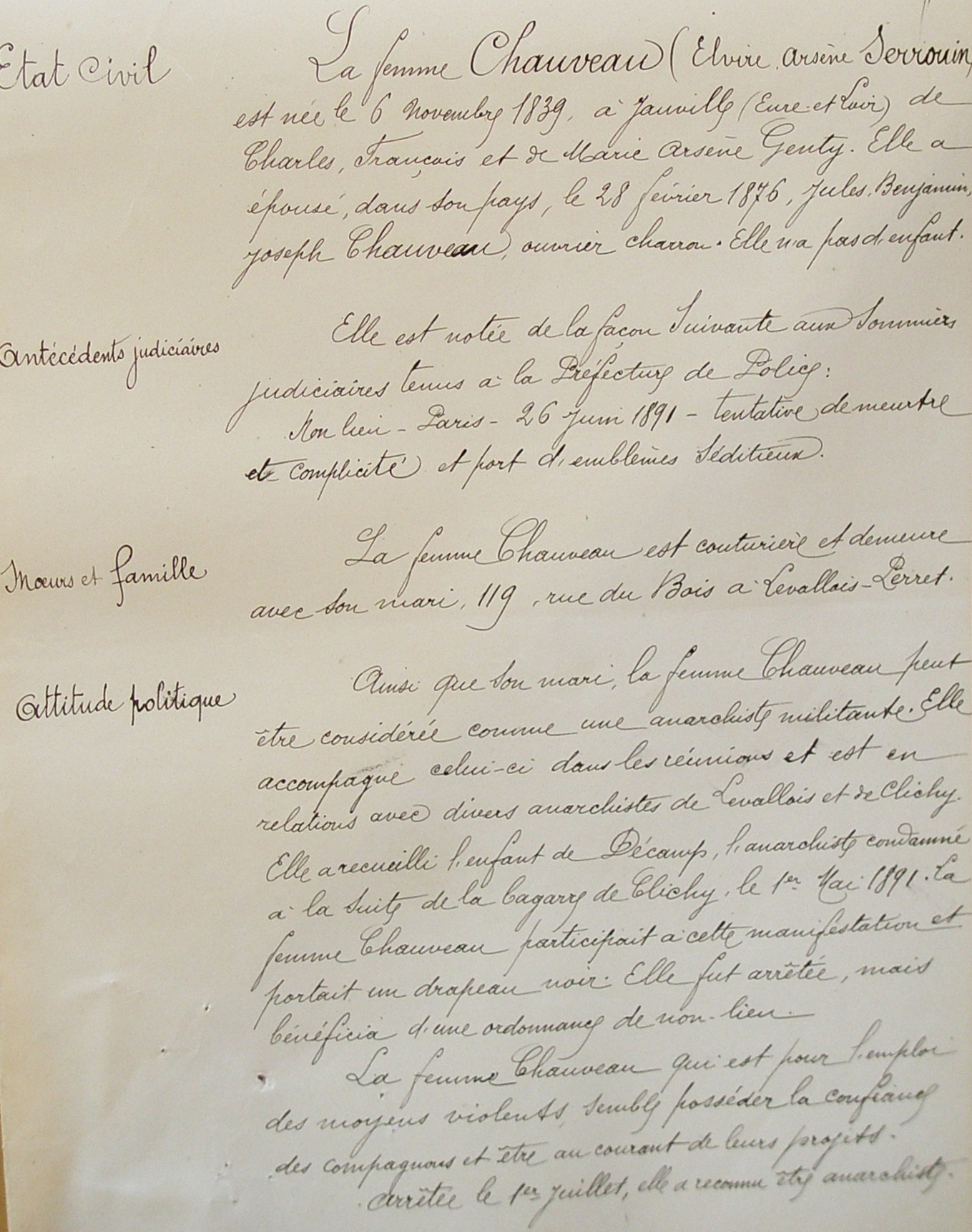
Report on Serrouin documenting her use of the black flag during the Clichy affair (collections of Archives Anarchistes)

However, the Levallois-Perret commissaire and his police officers were still en route – they entered the Clichy district and went into the wine merchant's, trying to seize the flag by force. The sequence of events is unclear, but shots were fired inside, which pushed everyone outside, where a fight broke out between police and anarchists; two police officers were wounded by gunfire, while at the same time mounted gendarmes arrived and began firing on the demonstrators, who tried to flee while being shot at. One of the anarchists who would have shot back at the police was Philogone Segard, who managed to flee his arrest with Désiré Pauwels and flee to London, where they lived some time with Louise Michel.

Three anarchists remained on the scene: Henri Decamps, Charles Dardare, and Louis Léveillé. All three struggled but were quickly arrested and taken to the police station.

There, under police control, the three were beaten very violently by the police. Decamps, whose ear was already split from the fight, had his temple opened and his face lacerated by blows. Léveillé, who had a gunshot wound to the thigh, was left without medical attention for several days, and Dardare nearly got killed by Dufoulon's saber; Dufoulon tried to kill him but was forcibly restrained by other officers.

=== Legal aftermath ===
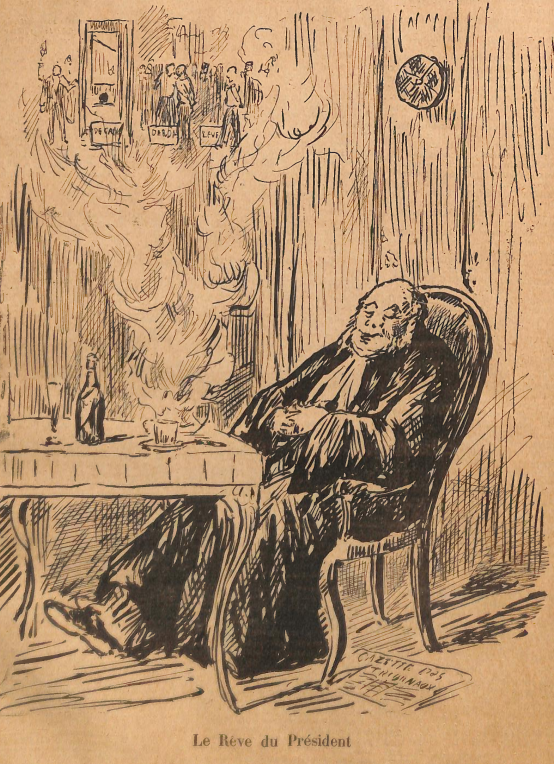
Edmont Benoit's 'The dream of the president' caricature in Le Père Peinard (6 September 1891)

On 28 August 1891, the three anarchists were brought to justice. Prosecutor Bulot demanded the death penalty; they defended themselves by acknowledging they were indeed anarchists but arguing that in their situation, they were only defending their lives. They complained about the police brutality they had suffered, without success – they managed to have the Levallois-Perret commissaire testify, who admitted that his police officers had beaten the accused, and Goron, who stated that he had not witnessed the incident but had indeed observed that hours after their arrest, when he arrived on the scene, they were heavily beaten and left without care. Léveillé declared:

I shall not attempt to provoke your indignation by recounting the treatment we endured. Let it suffice, Messieurs, that with my thigh pierced by a bullet, devoured by fever and suffering cruel pain, when I asked for water, I was answered with blows from boots and rifle butts. Let it suffice for you to recall that this painful agony lasted six times 24 days, and that I remained without care until the 20th of May — that is to say, for 20 days. However, Messieurs, in wartime, even when the fiercest interests run unchecked, it is an absolute rule that the wounded who fall into the hands of the enemy must be cared for and prisoners respected. But to policemen, we are more than enemies — because we are revolutionaries, anarchists.

The judge, Edmond Benoît, paid little attention to these arguments and testimonies and sentenced them to heavy penalties: while Léveillé was acquitted, Dardare received three years in prison and Decamps five.

== Legacy ==
=== Vengeance and catalyst for the Ère des attentats (1892–1894) ===
The Clichy affair sparked outrage among a segment of French society, but it was the anarchists who were most profoundly affected. The events—the police forcibly seizing a flag from a peaceful demonstration, the beating of those arrested, and the harsh judicial treatment of the case—sent shockwaves through anarchist circles in France.

During this period, anarchists were actively engaged in acts of propaganda of the deed—a strategy aiming to convey ideas through action rather than discourse. This manifested, among other things, in acts of a terrorist nature, particularly the assassinations of political figures or bomb attacks targeting symbols. The Clichy Affair ultimately convinced a number of anarchists that vengeance targeting those responsible for their repression would be legitimate.

Consequently, Ravachol, an anarchist militant from Saint-Étienne who was on the run and in Paris, met Henri Decamps' wife there. This encounter persuaded him to target the magistrates responsible for the trial. On 11 March 1892, Ravachol and other accomplices, such as Clotilde Mabillon, Charles Chaumentin, Charles Simon, and maybe Rosalie Soubère, Joseph Jas-Béala and Gustave Mathieu, carried out the Saint-Germain bombing. This was one of the first attacks of the period that public opinion dubbed the Ère des attentats (1892–1894), a two-year span during which numerous anarchist attacks occurred in France.

== Primary sources ==
=== Trial and police files ===
Collection of the site-archive Archives Anarchistes uploaded to Commons comprising, from the Archives de la préfecture de police de Paris :

- Ba 43 — Demonstrations on 1st of May 1891 (88 pages)
- Ba 44 — Review of 1st of May 1891 (139 pages)
- Ba 45 — The anarchists and the 1st May 1891 (approximately 700 pages divided into four) (1) (2) (3) (4)

== Bibliography ==
- Bouhey, Vivien (2008), Les Anarchistes contre la République [The Anarchists against the Republic] (in French), Rennes: Presses universitaires de Rennes (PUR)
- CEP; Petit, Dominique (2026), "MABILLON, Clotilde, Louise [épouse CHAUMENTIN, dit "CHAUMARTIN"]", Dictionnaire international des militants anarchistes, Paris
- Dupuy, Rolf; Petit, Dominique (2025), "SERROUIN, Arsène, Elvire [épouse CHAUVEAU]", Dictionnaire international des militants anarchistes, Paris
- Eisenzweig, Uri (2001). Fictions de l'anarchisme [Fictions of anarchism] (in French). France: C. Bourgois. ISBN 2-267-01570-6.
- Goron, Marie-François (1903), Les Mémoires de M. Goron, vol. 4, Paris: Flammarion
- Jourdain, Edouard (2013). L'anarchisme [Anarchism] (in French). Paris: La Découverte. ISBN 978-2-7071-9091-8.
- Merriman, John M. (2016). The dynamite club: how a bombing in fin-de-siècle Paris ignited the age of modern terror. Yale University Press. ISBN 978-0-300-21792-6.
- Ward, Colin (2004). Anarchism: A Very Short Introduction. Oxford University Press (OUP).
