= Rosalie Soubère =

French ribbon folder, newspaper seller and anarchist

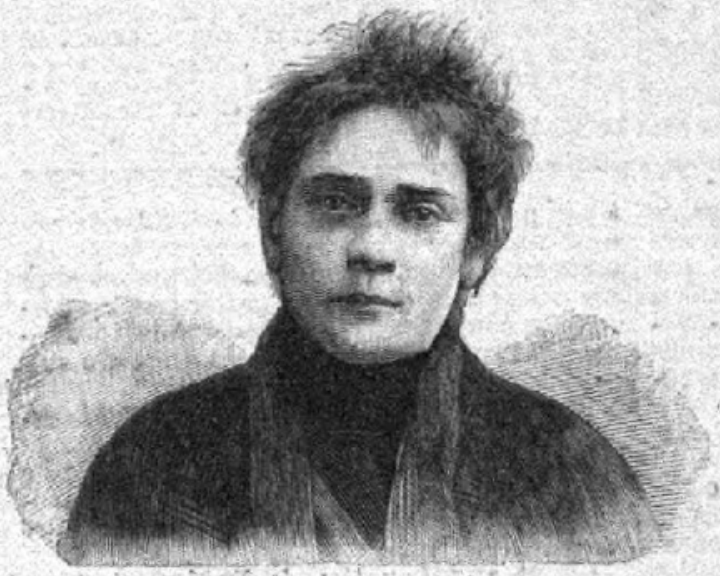
- Soubère illustrated in Le Petit Parisien, 1892
- Born: 21 September 1868
- Died: Unknown
- Occupations: ribbon-folder worker, newspaper seller, anarchist
- Known for: Taking responsibility - without having committed it - for the Saint-Germain bombing
- Movement: Anarchism
- Criminal charges: hosting criminals
- Criminal penalty: Six months of prison

Signature
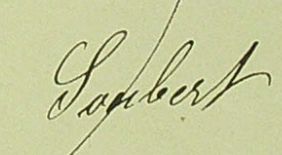

Rosalie Soubère, nicknamed Mariette (1868 – after 1894), was a French ribbon-folding worker and anarchist. She is best known for her proximity to Ravachol and for having been wrongly suspected of playing a central role in the Saint-Germain bombing, an attack that plunged France into the Ère des attentats (1892–1894) for which she took responsibility.

Born the twelfth of fourteen siblings, Soubère grew up in poverty in Saint-Étienne, beginning work at fifteen as a ribbon-folder. She left the family home at nineteen, joined the anarchist movement in France, and moved in with Joseph Jas-Béala, a fellow anarchist from Saint-Étienne. In 1889, she gave birth to a daughter, Louise Michelle, who lived only a month. She was fired from her job fifteen days after the infant's death, deemed 'too lazy and negligent' by her bosses.

She met and possibly associated with Ravachol in Saint-Étienne, but above all, she adopted a supportive role for the Saint-Germain bombing that Ravachol, Mabillon, Chaumentin, and other anarchists were preparing against judge Edmond Benoît, bringing them money from thefts and explosive materials, which were ultimately not used. Following the attack, Soubère was arrested and, when confronted with Clotilde Mabillon, decided to take responsibility for the attack in her place. She was acquitted of the charges against her but was put on trial again as an accomplice to Ravachol's common-law crimes. Acquitted once more, she was tried a third time, this time for allegedly harboring him during his flight. Sentenced to six months in prison and then released, she disappeared in 1894.

While the press, authorities, and anarchists of the period tended to hold her responsible for the bombing, more recent historians challenge this version, arguing that she actually sacrificed herself to save companion Clotilde Mabillon, who was a mother, from being imprisoned or executed.

== Biography ==
=== Youth and politicization ===
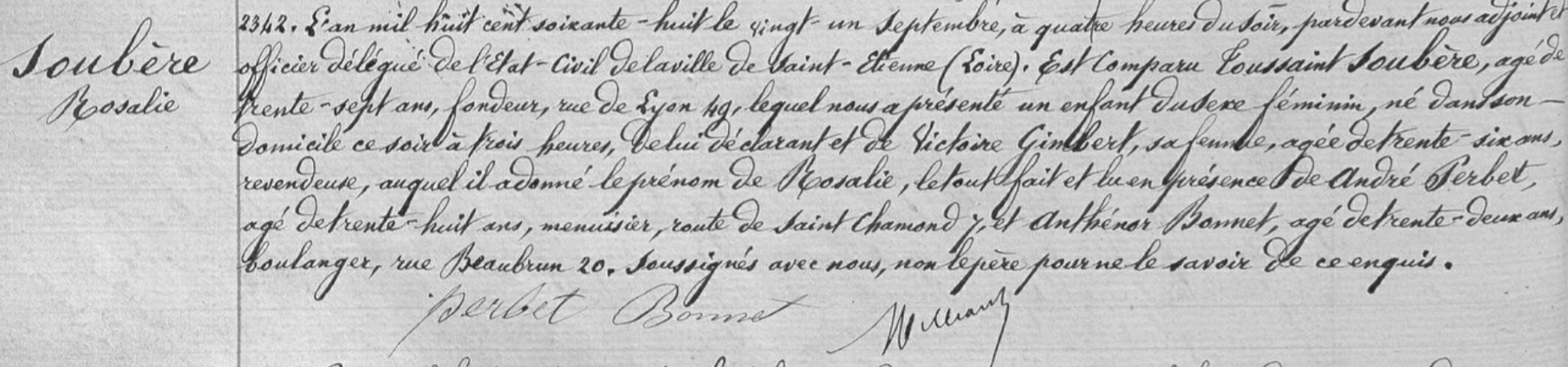
Rosalie Soubère's birth certificate in the Archives municipales de Saint-Étienne. 21 September 1868.

Rosalie Soubère was born on 21 September 1868, in Saint-Étienne. She was the daughter of Victoire Gimbert, a lace-maker, reeler, and later a vegetable seller, and Toussaint Soubère, orphaned by his father at the age of four, a baker then foundry worker who committed suicide in 1888 following his separation from his wife. Soubère was the twelfth of fourteen children in the Gimbert-Soubère couple. Several of her relatives worked as gunsmiths, and one of her brothers enlisted as a soldier before being killed in Vietnam.

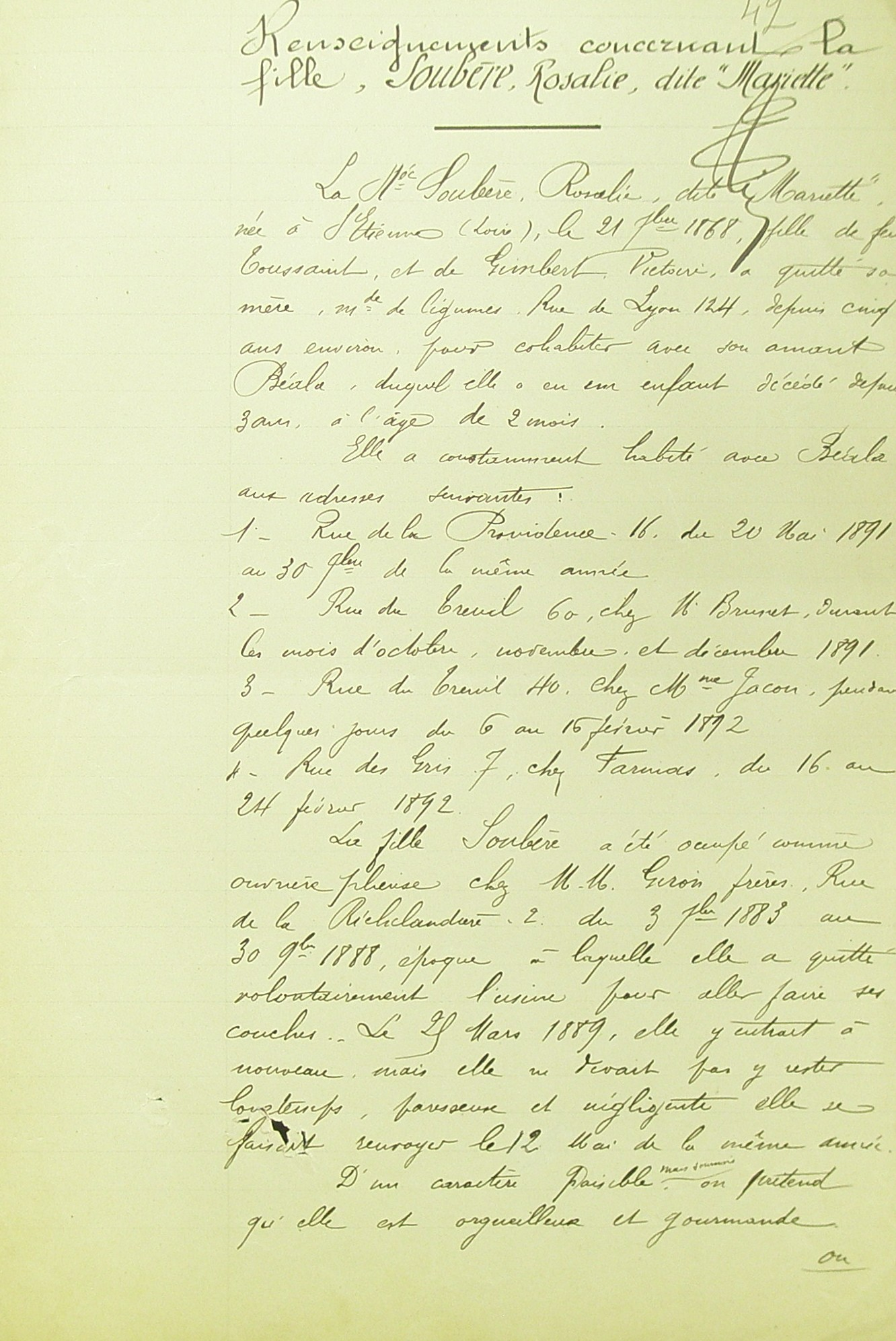
Secret police report on Soubère (collections of Archives anarchistes) (1892)

At the age of 15, Soubère began working at the Giron brothers' factory in Chantegrillet. In 1887, she left her home at 124 rue de Lyon in Saint-Étienne. She moved in with Joseph Jas-Béala, known as Béala, and lived with him in cohabitation, although he didn't seem to be at home frequently.

In 1889, Soubère gave birth to a daughter, whom Béala did not recognize, and named her Louise Michelle. The choice of this name, which potentially refers to Louise Michel, suggests that she was possibly already an anarchist by this time.

She returned to work twenty days after giving birth, but her daughter died the following month; Soubère did not go to register the death herself. Two weeks after her daughter's death, she was fired by her bosses, who judged her 'too lazy and negligent'.

During this period, she eventually met Ravachol through Béala, who associated with him through the local laborers' union ('syndicat des hommes de peine') of Saint-Étienne. Indeed, as the union secretary, he had an office adjacent to the one Ravachol frequently visited.

=== Move to Saint-Denis and the Saint-Germain bombing ===
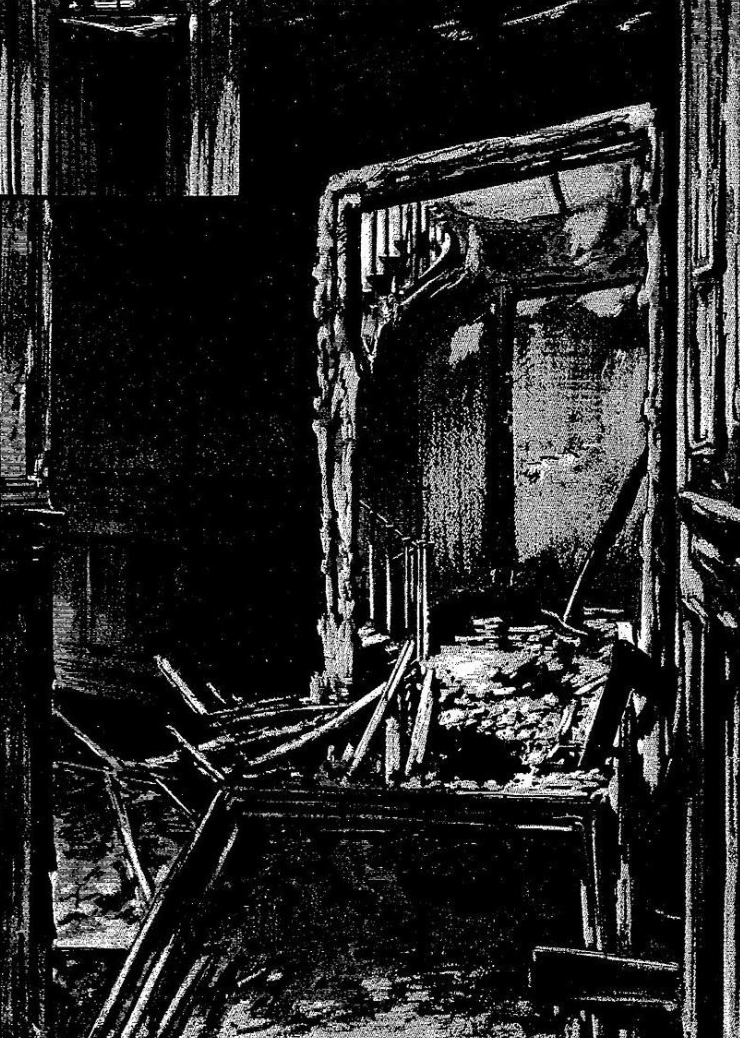
Depiction of the Saint-Germain bombing aftermath in L'Univers illustré (19 March 1892)

While a conspiracy was being prepared following the Clichy affair (1 May 1891), intended to take revenge on the Clichy police and subsequently judge Edmond Benoît for their treatment of the anarchists involved, Soubère and her partner traveled to Saint-Denis, where they transported explosive materials meant to aid in the plot's execution. Furthermore, the couple brought between 3,000 and 5,000 francs to support the conspiracy, this 'considerable' sum likely came from Ravachol's illegalist activities in the Loire, with a significant portion necessarily originating from the robbery of the hermit of Chambles.

However, the couple's explosives were not used by the conspirators Mabillon, Chaumentin, Ravachol, Simon, and possibly Mathieu, because the Soisy dynamite theft of 15 February 1892, provided the Parisian anarchist circles, and Ravachol's group, with explosive material of much higher quality than what she and Béala had brought.

On 11 March 1892, Ravachol, perhaps Béala, and at least one woman carrying the pot-bomb under her petticoats, carried out the Saint-Germain bombing.

=== First trial ===
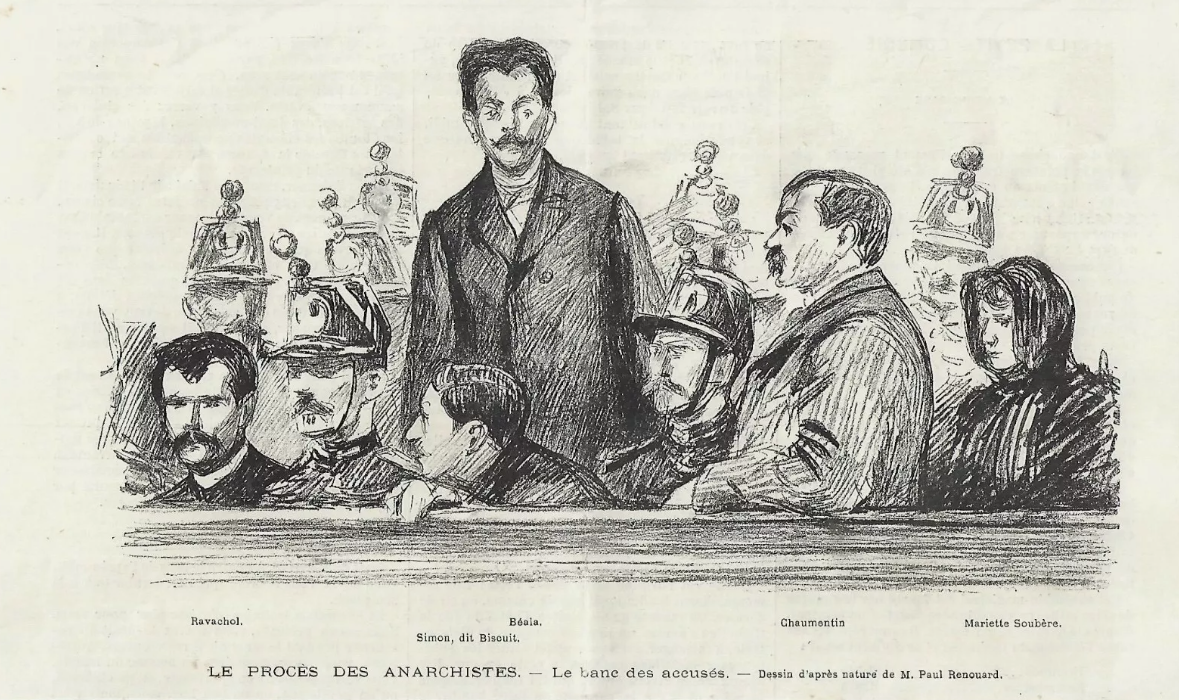
Representation of her first trial in L'Illustration (30 April 1892) by Paul Renouard

Soubère was arrested on March 23 in Saint-Denis along with Béala. She refused to answer questions and denied all the facts. Notably, according to historians Dominique Petit and CEP, during this first arrest, she was confronted with Clotilde Mabillon, one of the primary members of the conspiracy and likely the person who had actually carried the dynamite. During this confrontation, the two agreed that Soubère would take upon herself the responsibility of having carried the bomb. This choice was reportedly motivated by the fact that Mabillon was then a mother of two children, whereas Soubère was not; she therefore chose to risk the death penalty in Mabillon's place.

On the eve of her trial, 25 April 1892, anarchist militants from the Pieds-plats group, Théodule Meunier and maybe Jean-Pierre François, carried out the Véry bombing, targeting Véry, a restaurateur who had called the police on Ravachol, killing him in the explosion. She appeared with her four accomplices before the Court d'assises of Paris the following day. She was defended by a lawyer named maître Eugène Crémieux, and maintained her innocence by declaring that she had never been aware of what the pot she carried under her skirt during the Saint-Germain bombing contained.

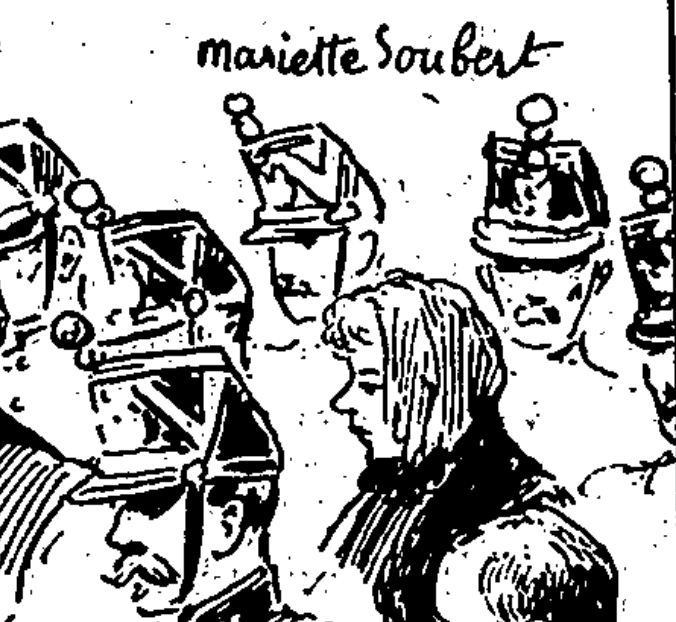
Depiction of her being surrounded by police at her first trial in L'Univers illustré (30 April 1892)

During the trial in late April 1892, she was dressed entirely in black and wept profusely. Quesnay de Beaurepaire, the prosecutor, attempted to partially spare her during his closing argument. Indeed, he was aware of the agreement between Soubère and Mabillon but was likely seeking to protect the informant X2 linked to the Chaumentin couple, who were collaborating with the authorities, by continuing to target Soubère. In any case, he stated at the trial, in a sexist declaration:

[Soubère] is a woman; she is weak. She was tied to one of the accused, whose influence she was under, by the bond of affection. There is a doubt regarding her guilt from which she may benefit. As far as she is concerned, let the jury not hesitate to show pity and to consult their hearts.

Throughout the trial, both she and the other defendants maintained that she was indeed guilty of carrying the pot-bomb, but that she had been entirely ignorant of its contents. Since the police had very little evidence, and Soubère was likely innocent of the action, she was acquitted.

=== Second trial ===
Soubère was released following her acquittal but was prosecuted again less than two weeks later for Ravachol's common-law crimes in Saint-Étienne. Arrested with Béala at 3:00 AM and transported to the Loire by train, she was forced to walk in chains from the station to the prison. She was placed in a cell adjacent to those of Béala and Ravachol, cried profusely during her first days of incarceration, and asked to see her mother.

She appeared at her second trial wearing a black straw hat on her head and answered the trial interrogation with a smile. Her lawyer was once again Eugène Crémieux for this second trial. When the judge told her that the reports about her were not unfavorable, she misunderstood the remark and said she was surprised, which made part of the audience laugh. She responded to her interrogatory with brief remarks, accused Chaumentin, who had denounced them, of lying, and then fell silent. Later, Soubère was indignant and forcefully confronted Chaumentin when the latter publicly accused her during the trial of having sheltered Ravachol at her home while he was on the run for the murder of the hermit of Chambles. She called him a 'liar', a 'wretch', and a 'scoundrel', and insisted she had only met Chaumentin in Paris and had not known him before. This reaction is not surprising, for CEP, given that she just had saved Chaumentin's wife by taking her place for the bombing.

To a witness who claimed to have seen her and to identify her by recalling that she was missing a tooth, Soubère replied:

Look at that nerve ! Oh, you noticed I was missing a tooth ? You must have looked the wrong way, my friend; I am missing three.

She also replied that he would have seen her "thinner" than she actually was. Her attorney, Crémieux, gave his closing argument around midnight and achieved a certain degree of success.

Soubère and Jas-Béala were acquitted once again on all charges in this second trial, while Ravachol was sentenced to death.

=== Third trial, imprisonment and disappearance ===
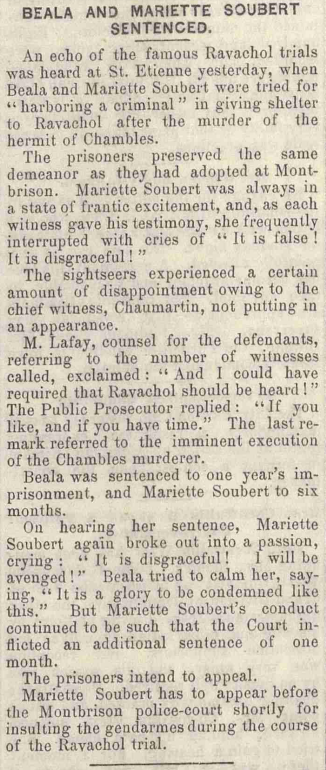
Article on Rosalie Soubère and Joseph Jas-Béala being sentenced for harboring Ravachol (6 July 1892) in The New York Herald

Soubère was referred to criminal court for having sheltered Ravachol at her home. She was convicted for the first time during this third consecutive trial, this time for having harbored Ravachol. After this conviction, she exclaimed:

This is shameful! This is disgraceful! I will have my revenge at the risk of my life!

This declaration caused deep alarm among the judges and prompted one of them to abruptly leave the room out of fear. Historian Thierry Lévy regards this event as a clear example of the panic instilled in magistrates by anarchists during that period, following the two attacks targeting them.

The anarchist received an additional month for this statement, which the judges considered an outrage. Béala, for his part, was sentenced to one year in prison on 5 July 1892. She appealed, and her sentence was reduced by one month.

After the Carmaux-Bons Enfants bombing, in which Émile Henry and other anarchists attacked the headquarters of the Carmaux Mining Company, Soubère was suspected and arrested. Indeed, during the attack, an unknown brown-haired woman wearing a black shawl was alleged to have been the person who planted the bomb. She was therefore arrested, but the judge quickly concluded that she did not know Henry and would not be linked to the case. It was probably Adrienne Chailliey, according to Vivien Bouhey.

Soubère and Béala then settled in Saint-Denis on rue de la Briche, living under the names Viala and Gibert to avoid detection. At this time, they worked as newspaper vendors at rue du Croissant before moving back to Saint-Étienne.

Several hypotheses regarding the rest of her life have been proposed by various historians. For instance, Rolf Dupuy and Bertrand Thierry suggest that she might be the 'Comrade Mariette' who served as the treasurer of Terre Libre in the 1930s, whereas CEP considers this hypothesis to be implausible.

== Legacy ==
In February 1894, an anarchist arrested in Saint-Étienne for a common law crime presented her portrait to the police who had apprehended him and declared that he was inspired by her.

=== Downward reevaluation of her role in the Saint-Germain bombing ===
While Soubère was considered responsible for the attack by the authorities and by the anarchists during the trial, this view has been revised by more recent historians. Thus, CEP and Dominique Petit, in their 2026 biographies of Soubère and Mabillon, based on the prior work of Rolf Dupuy and Bertrand Thierry, revisit the question of her links to the bombing and conclude that she sacrificed herself by taking responsibility in Mabillon's place. This new interpretation would explain, on one hand, why she was acquitted, and on the other, why the prosecutor, aware of this maneuver, seemed to relatively spare her, potentially wishing to protect the informant X2 behind the action of publicly absolving the Chaumentin-Mabillon couple, who was collaborating with authorities at that point - making them the official primary source of information.

== Works ==
=== Second trial (Archives de la Loire - 2 U 299 - courtesy of Archives anarchistes) ===
- Interrogation, 17 May 1892, Montbrison (in French on Wikisource)
- Interrogation, 17 May 1892, Montbrison (in French on Wikisource)
- Final interrogation, 31 May 1892, Montbrison (in French on Wikisource)

== About ==
=== Texts ===
- The trial of the dynamiters, in Le Père Peinard (24 April 1892), defending her and her co-accused during her first trial

=== Police sources ===
- Archives de la Préfecture de police de Paris - Ba 139 - Saint-Germain file
- Testimonies on the Saint Germain bombing, 14 March 1892 (Archives de la Préfecture de police de Paris - JA 8 Ravachol - courtesy of Archives anarchistes)
- Arrest of Soubère and Béala, March-May 1892 (Archives de la Préfecture de police de Paris - JA 8 Ravachol - courtesy of Archives anarchistes)

== Bibliography ==
- Accoce, Pierre (1998). "« Ils ont eu Sadi Carnot ! »" [They got Sadi Carnot!]. Ces assassins qui ont voulu changer l'Histoire. Paris: Plon. ISBN 978-2259189873.
- Bouhey, Vivien (2009), Les Anarchistes contre la République [The Anarchists against the Republic], Rennes: Presses universitaires de Rennes (PUR), ISBN 978-2-7535-1359-4
- Bouchardon, Pierre (1931). Ravachol et compagnie [Ravachol and company] (PDF). Paris: Hachette.
- Boulanger, Louis (1893). Les exploits de Ravachol, l'homme à la dynamite [The feats of Ravachol: the dynamite man] (in French). Paris: L. Boulanger.
- CEP; et al. (Rolf Dupuy, Bertrand Thierry, Gilles Braschi) (2026), "SOUBÈRE, Rosalie [ou SOUBERT, dite "MARIETTE"]", Dictionnaire international des militants anarchistes, Paris
- CEP; Petit, Dominique (2026), "MABILLON, Clotilde, Louise [épouse CHAUMENTIN, dit "CHAUMARTIN"]", Dictionnaire international des militants anarchistes, Paris
- Lévy, Thierry (2009). Plutôt la mort que l'injustice : au temps des procès anarchistes [Rather death than injustice: in the time of anarchist trials] (in French). Paris: Odile Jacob. ISBN 9782738118318.
- Merriman, John M. (2016). The dynamite club: how a bombing in fin-de-siècle Paris ignited the age of modern terror. Yale University Press. ISBN 978-0-300-21792-6.
- Dupuy, Rolf; Bertrand, Thierry (2012), SOUBÈRE Rosalie (dite Mariette), Paris: Le Maitron
