= Saint-Germain bombing =

1892 anarchist bombing in Paris, France

- Part of Ère des attentats
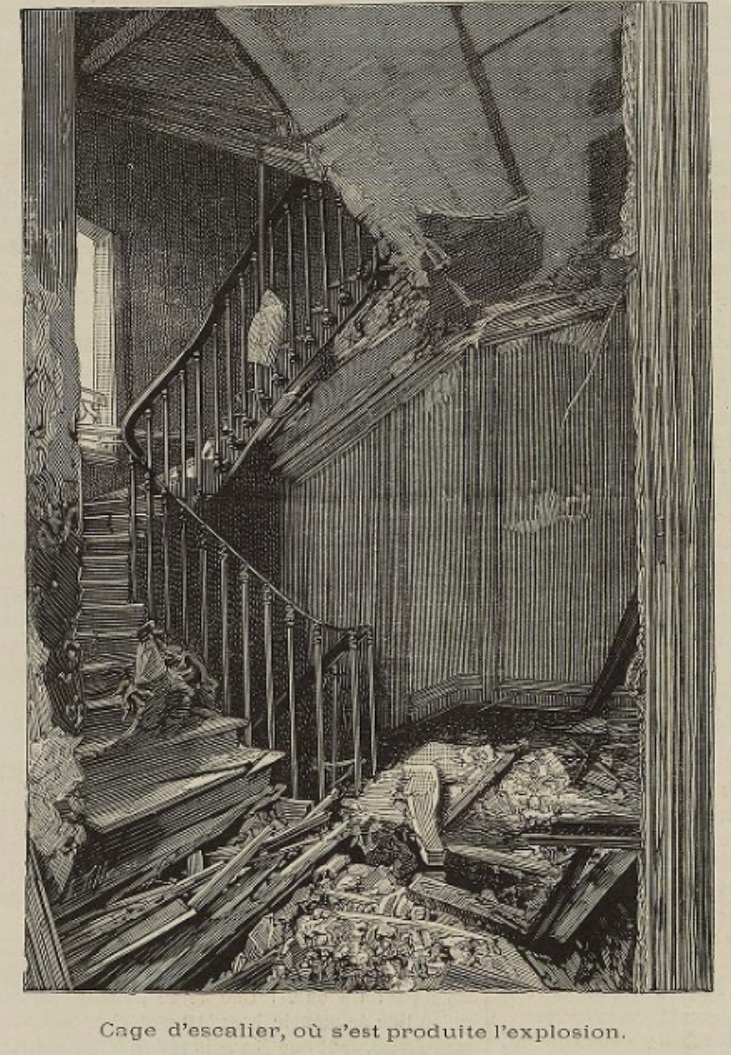
- Photographical representation of the aftermath of the Saint Germain bombing in L'Illustration (19 March 1892)
- Location: 48°51′10″N 2°20′18″E; Paris, France
- Date: 11 March 1892
- Attack type: bombing
- Deaths: 0
- Injuries: 1
- Perpetrators: Ravachol; Gustave Mathieu (?); Rosalie Soubère (?); Charles Simon; Joseph Jas-Béala (?); Charles Chaumentin; Clotilde Mabillon
- No. of participants: 4
- Motive: Anarchism; Revenge for the trial of the Clichy Affair
- Verdict: Guilty with mitigating circumstances (Jas-Béala and Soubère acquitted) (Mathieu escaped and charges ultimately dropped against him)
- Convicted: 2

The Saint-Germain bombing was a bomb attack carried out on 11 March 1892, in Paris by Ravachol and some members of his group, although the specific involvement of others is debated, including Gustave Mathieu, Rosalie Soubère, Joseph Jas-Béala, Charles Simon, and Charles Chaumentin and Clotilde Mabillon. The attack was an act of vengeance against Edmond Benoît, the judge presiding over the trial of the accused in the Clichy affair, where three anarchist demonstrators were arrested by the police, beaten with sabers, deprived of care and water for some time, and judged very harshly by Benoît.

After receiving a significant shipment of stolen dynamite, Simon and Ravachol built the bomb together before some members set out for the judge's residence. Soubère carried the bomb under her skirts before handing it to Ravachol, who placed it. It exploded but failed to kill its target, causing no deaths and one injury.

The operation was a strategic failure: the conspirators missed their target, the police were searching for them, and although they failed to prevent the Clichy bombing on 27 March 1892, where the group attempted to assassinate the prosecutor in the case, Simon was arrested after being denounced by an informant. After the second attack, Ravachol, Jas-Béala, and Soubère were quickly captured and put on trial. Ravachol, whose legal strategy was to take full responsibility for the attack to exonerate his companions, was sentenced to life imprisonment and later to death. Soubère and Jas-Béala were acquitted, while Simon was sentenced to life imprisonment and deported to Cayenne. Meanwhile, Mathieu managed to escape the French authorities going underground.

Despite this, the attack was a significant tactical success, as it marked the beginning of the Ère des attentats (1892–1894), a violent confrontation between the French state and anarchists. The attack inspired other anarchist militants such as Auguste Vaillant, Émile Henry or Amédée Pauwels. In this context, terrorism underwent significant transformations. Although the Saint-Germain bombing was still based on the traditional form of terrorism, 'tyrannicide', figures inspired by it, such as Émile Henry, used it as a model to develop indiscriminate or mass terrorism, a significant form of terrorism in the 20th and 21st centuries.

For his defiance towards death and complete dedication to his ideals, Ravachol, in particular, became a mythical figure among anarchist circles, especially among French illegalists, where he was seen as a martyr for the anarchist cause.

== History ==
=== Context ===
In the 19th century, anarchism emerged and took shape in Europe before spreading. Anarchists advocated a struggle against all forms of domination perceived as unjust including economic domination brought forth by capitalism. They were particularly opposed to the State, seen as the organization that legitimized these dominations through its police, army and propaganda.

In France, the already conflictual relations between anarchists and the French State, embodied by the Third Republic, entered a new period of intense tension: in 1891, the Fourmies shooting, where the army fired on demonstrators demanding an eight‑hour workday, and the Clichy Affair, when anarchists were arrested, beaten and mistreated by the police, radicalized a number of anarchists in France. The fact that the anarchists arrested after the Clichy affair were tried with great severity – the prosecutor demanding the death penalty for the three and the judge handing down harsh prison sentences of three and five years – was an important catalyst for the advent of the Ère des attentats.

=== Preparations and bombing ===
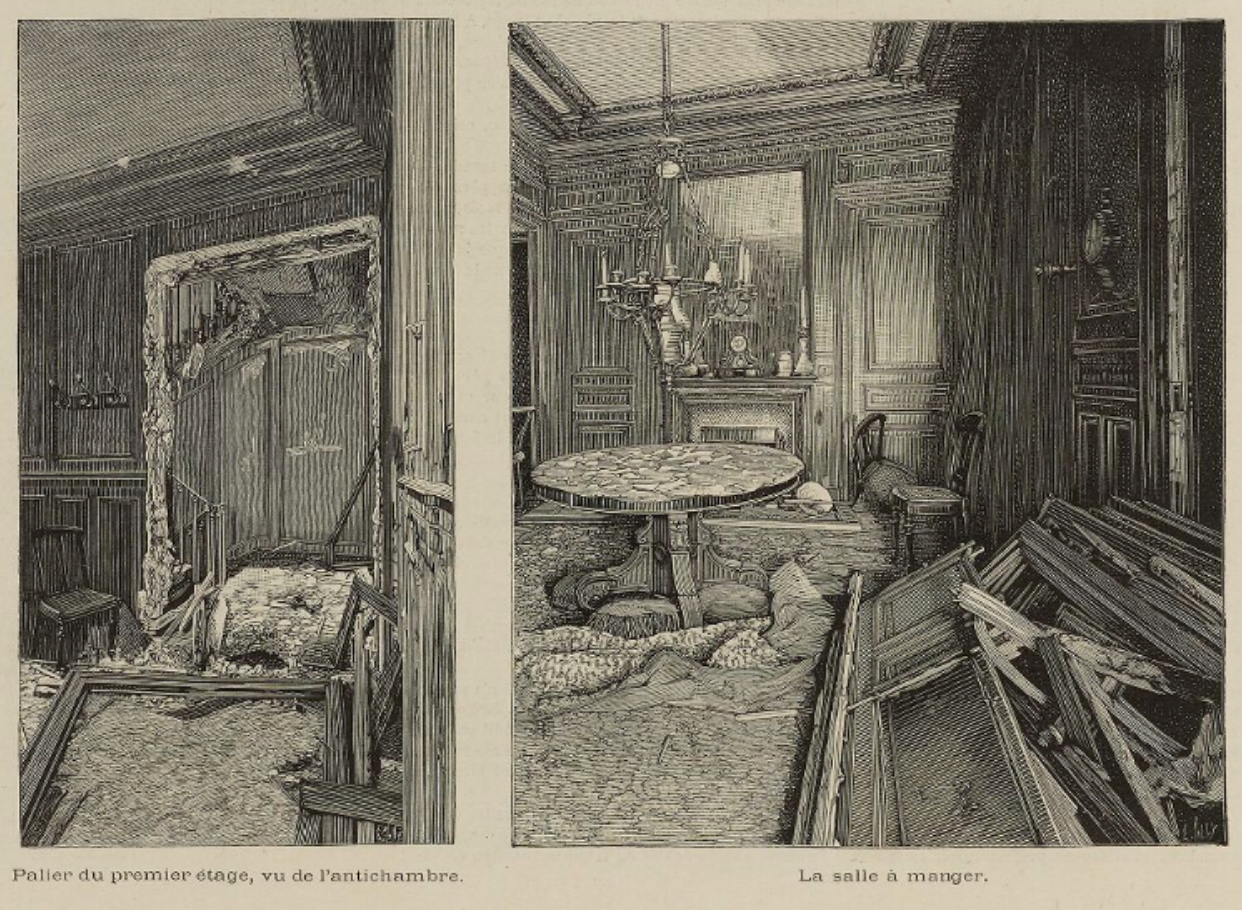
Representation of the aftermath of the Saint Germain bombing in L'Illustration (19 March 1892)

Within this context, a group of anarchists composed of Ravachol, Gustave Mathieu, Charles and Clotilde Chaumentin, and Charles 'Cookie' Simon, around whom Rosalie Soubère and Joseph Jas-Béala gravitated, became radicalized following the Clichy affair trial.

During the night of 14–15 February 1892, anarchists from the northern districts of Paris managed to seize thirty kilograms of dynamite by robbing the Soisy-sur-Seine quarry, giving them the possibility of using this important arsenal in the preparation of attacks—the latter then rapidly disseminated within anarchist circles in the Parisian region and eventually ended up in the hands of Ravachol's group.

In the following days, Ravachol and Simon built the bomb. Simon conducted a first reconnaissance of the judge's residence at 136 Boulevard Saint-Germain. Then Ravachol and other members of the group took a tram to carry out the attack on 11 March 1892. Soubère sat between Simon and Béala, hiding the bomb under her skirts. She then handed it to Ravachol, who, armed with two loaded pistols, entered the building, placed the bomb in the middle of the second floor, since he did not know exactly where in the building Benoît lived. He lit the fuse and fled, while Soubère and Béala stood watch outside. The militant remained on-site to observe the aftermath of the explosion as her companions left the area.

The bombing caused no deaths and did not injure Benoît, who lived on the fifth floor, but did injure one person.

=== Aftermath ===
X2 view on Ravachol-Saint Denis networks prior to the attack

The judge spoke in the Bonapartist newspaper L'Autorité a few days later, saying:

It is absolutely false that I have ever received, at any time, threatening letters. No doubt, in my functions as an investigating judge, which I exercised until 1887, I often dealt with anarchists; but I never noticed that any of them showed me any particular hostility. Since then, in my new capacity as a counselor at the court of appeal, I have had to lead the debates of several anarchist trials, and in particular, last year, those of the anarchists of Saint-Denis [i.e., the Clichy affair]. But if you recall that the jury treated them very leniently and that the most severely condemned of the accused received only two years in prison, you will no doubt find that the anarchists have no grounds to retaliate against me.

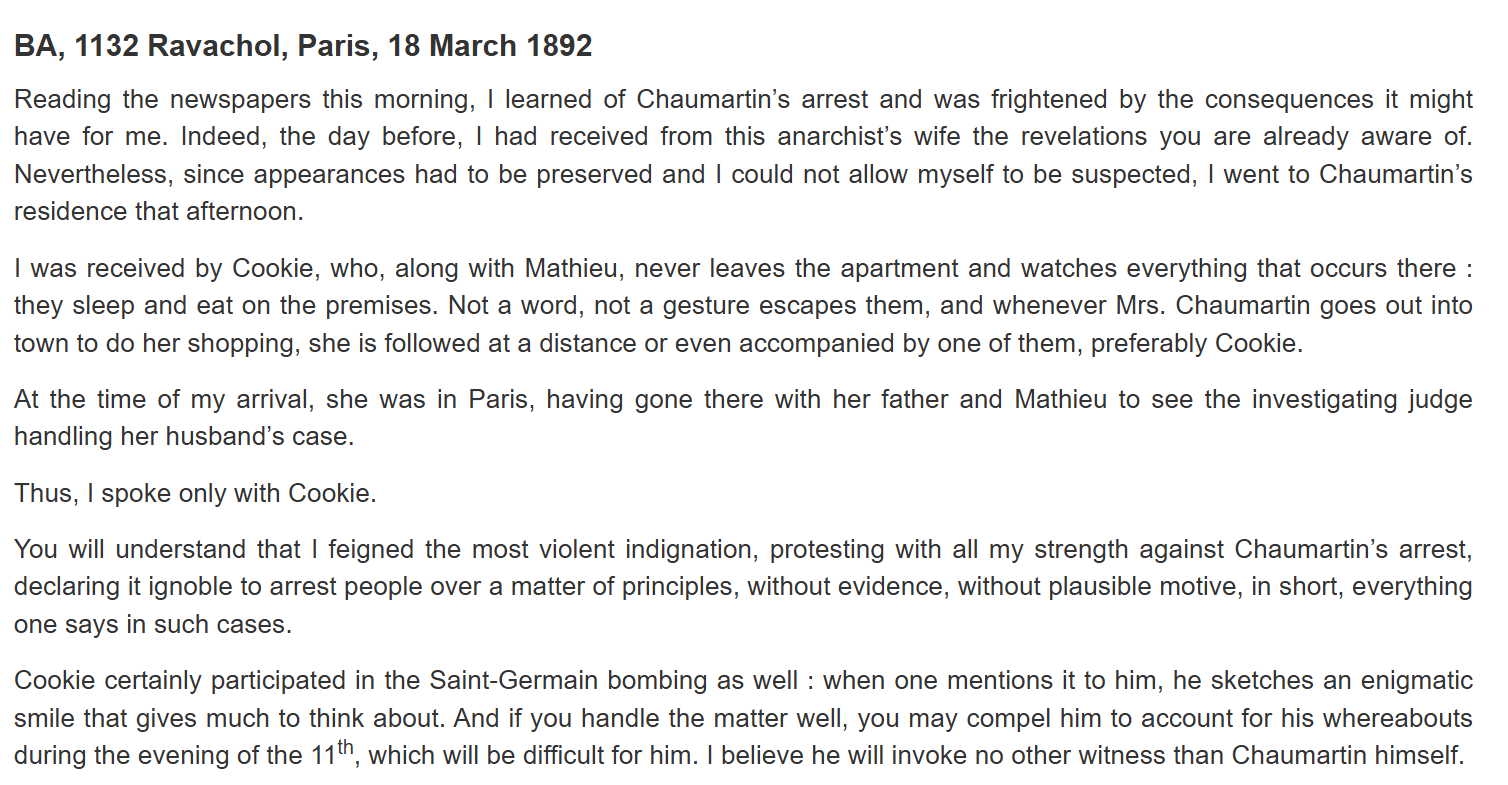
X2 speaking about the state of Ravachol's band after the attack (The Anarchist Library - Anarchiv)

The anarchists involved in the plan were not satisfied with the failure of their operation: they decided to make another attempt soon after, this time targeting the prosecutor in the Clichy affair, Bulot. This preparation was complicated by the arrest of Simon after the betrayal of Charles and Clotilde Chaumentin, who gave multiple clues about the affair to police authorities while in custody. According to Jean Maitron and Rolf Dupuy, this denunciation by the traitorous anarchist actually provided little help to the police, as the authorities already knew most of the information he provided through informant X2. Ravachol managed to carry out the attack on 27 March 1892 before being arrested in the following days, with the first revolutionary of the list being captured after being reported to the police by the owner of the restaurant Le Véry, where he was dining. Meanwhile, Gustave Mathieu managed to flee and disappear.

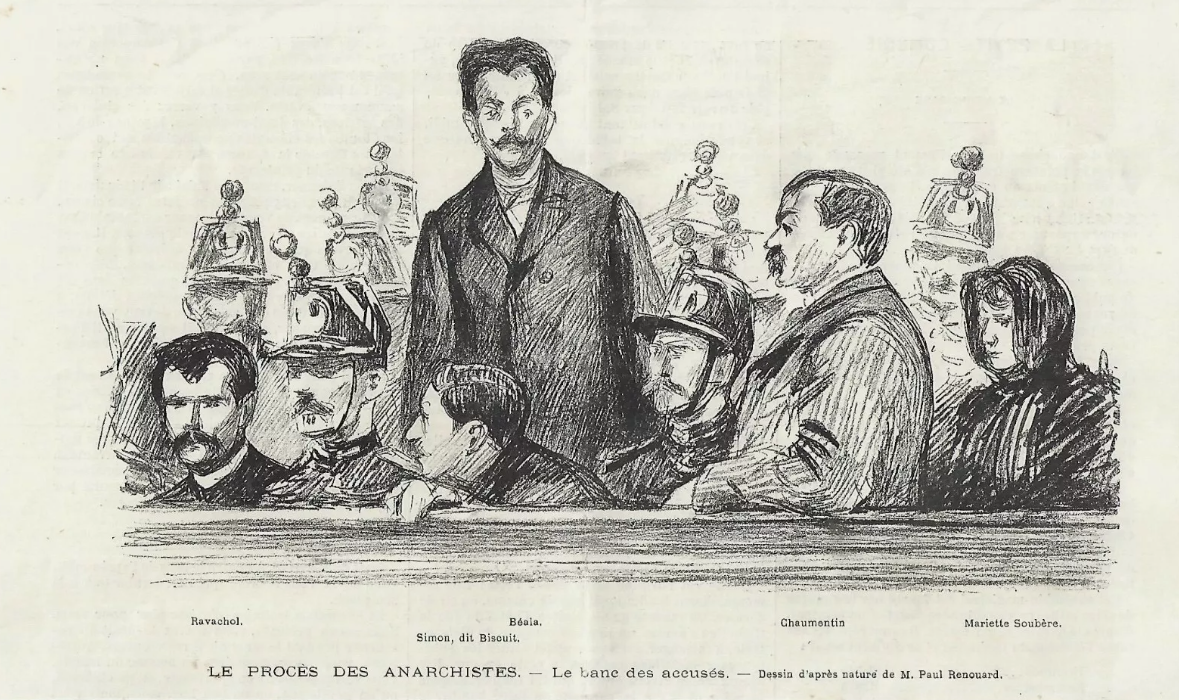
Representation of the trial of Ravachol and his accomplices in L'Illustration (30 April 1892) by Paul Renouard

The day before their trial, anarchist militants Jean-Pierre François and Théodule Meunier carried out the Véry bombing, targeting and killing the restaurant's owner. During their trial, which included Simon, Soubère, Ravachol, Béala, and Chaumentin, the accused—except for Chaumentin, who was acquitted due to his denunciation—adopted defensive strategies aimed at placing full responsibility for all acts on Ravachol. He decided to take complete responsibility for the attack to exonerate his companions, including Chaumentin.

Although he presented himself as the sole perpetrator of the action, he expressed regret and apologized for possibly harming innocent people. The anarchist justified and legitimized the attack with a series of arguments, saying he wanted 'to terrorize to make people think'. Although he was later sentenced to death in another trial that year for a murder he had committed and for crimes he had likely not committed, Ravachol was sentenced here to life imprisonment. He concluded his statements during the trial by saying:

May my innocent and involuntary victims understand and forgive me. [...] Long live anarchy!

As for the others, Simon was sentenced to life penal labor, while Rosalie Soubère and Joseph Jas-Béala were acquitted. The jurors found Simon and Ravachol guilty but considered that mitigating circumstances applied to their actions.

== Legacy ==
=== Beginning of the Ère des attentats ===
Although the attack was a strategic failure and ended with the arrest of most of the group's members, the Boulevard Saint-Germain bombing and Ravachol's sentencing greatly inspired other terrorists of the Ère des attentats (1892–1894), such as Vaillant, Henry, and Meunier in France. For example, Meunier, who took refuge in the United Kingdom after the Véry bombing—which he carried out in response to Ravachol's arrest—decided to claim responsibility for the attack after seeing the impact of Ravachol's bombings in the press. Anarchist attacks then multiplied in the West. While they initially followed the traditional form of 'tyrannicide' terrorism, like the Boulevard Saint-Germain bombing, which targeted representatives of the state (politicians, magistrates, police officers, military officials), the period gradually saw the emergence of 'indiscriminate' or 'mass' terrorism, which became the foundation of modern terrorism.

=== Shift in the scope of terrorism ===
The Saint-Germain bombing, like other attacks during the Ère des attentats marked the emergence of a terrorist symbolism tied to locations rather than individuals. Karine Salomé writes on this subject:

The ambiguity becomes even more pronounced with anarchist attacks, which were no longer exclusively linked to the presence of the head of state. Instead, they began targeting the homes of individuals from diverse backgrounds, such as magistrates Benoît and Bulot during the bombings on Boulevard Saint-Germain and Rue de Clichy in 1892. They also struck symbolic sites, including the Lobau barracks, the Carmaux Mining Company (initially targeted by the bomb that exploded at the Bons Enfants police station), the Madeleine church, the National Assembly, and the Terminus café. From then on, with the exception of Sadi Carnot's assassination, anarchist attacks signaled a transition from symbolism centered on individuals—specifically the head of state—to symbolism centered on locations, a shift that contemporaries did not always comprehend.

=== Myth(s) of Ravachol ===
This attack marked the beginning of the legend of Ravachol. Within anarchist circles, his figure was initially met with distance and disapproval, as the fact that Ravachol had committed 'vile' crimes—such as desecrating graves or murdering a hermit—before engaging in political attacks was poorly received by many anarchists, who initially distanced themselves from his actions. However, his two bombings, his decision to take full responsibility for them—protecting his companions—and his execution changed the situation. His image was thus rehabilitated by anarchists, who gradually transformed him into a hero and a martyr.

More broadly, Ravachol came to embody, in French society, the image of the anarchist hero and the dynamiter—a phenomenon reinforced by the fact that the revolutionary stood at the crossroads between banditry and political struggle, between common-law crimes and political violence. Mireille Piarotas describes the triple orientation of the legends surrounding him as follows:

He is the only one who, through his actions, combines the dual figure of the common criminal and the political hero, thus raising the question of the relationship between criminal violence and revolutionary violence—and he is the only one to simultaneously embody the two major figures of the hero in popular literature: the vile scoundrel and the avenger, the bandit and the justiciar, the monster and the saint (or even, as we shall see, Christ). The myth of Ravachol is therefore a complex and composite myth, shaped through a triple transfiguration: as a hero of anarchism, he is also a popular legend and a mystical, even Christ-like, figure.

== See also ==
=== Police sources (courtesy of Archives anarchistes) ===
==== Archives de la préfecture de police de Paris (both are very incompletely added to Wikisource so far and not full at all) ====
- JA 8 — Ravachol
- Ba 139 — Boulevard Saint-Germain

== Bibliography ==
- Accoce, Pierre (1998). "« Ils ont eu Sadi Carnot ! »" [They got Sadi Carnot!]. Ces assassins qui ont voulu changer l'Histoire. Paris: Plon. ISBN 978-2259189873.
- Ferragu, Gilles (2019), "L'écho des bombes : l'invention du terrorisme « à l'aveugle » (1893–1895)" [The echo of bombs: The invention of indiscriminate terrorism (1893–1895)], Ethnologie française, 49 (1): 21–31, doi:10.3917/ethn.191.0021
- Jourdain, Edouard (2013). L'anarchisme [Anarchism]. Paris: La Découverte. ISBN 978-2-7071-9091-8.
- Merriman, John M. (2016). The dynamite club: how a bombing in fin-de-siècle Paris ignited the age of modern terror. Yale University Press. ISBN 978-0-300-21792-6.
- Piarotas, Mireille (2000). Regards populaires sur la violence [Popular looks at violence]. Saint Etienne (France): Presses Universitaires de Saint-Etienne (PUSE). ISBN 978-2862721804.
- Salomé, Karine (2011), L'Ouragan homicide : L'attentat politique en France au XIXe siècle [The homicidal Hurricane: political assassination in 19th century France], Paris: Champ Vallon / Epoque, ISBN 978-2-87673-538-5
- Ward, Colin (2004). Anarchism: A Very Short Introduction. Oxford University Press (OUP).
