= Joseph Jas-Béala =

French mechanician, activist and anarchist terrorist

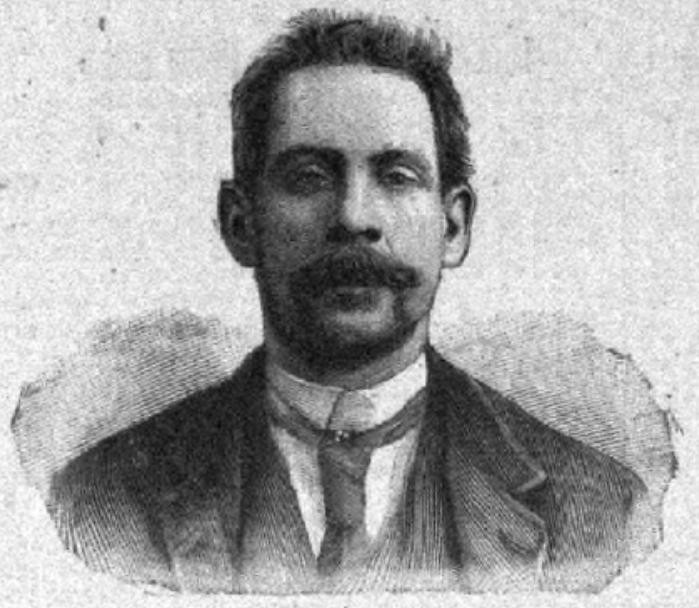
- Depiction of Joseph Jas-Béala in Le Petit Parisien : supplément illustré (1st May 1892)
- Born: 15 August 1865; Firminy
- Died: 17 June 1940 (aged 74); 2nd arrondissement of Lyon
- Occupation: Anarchist, mechanic

Joseph Jas-Béala, nicknamed 'Béala', (15 August 1865 in Firminy – 17 June 1940 in Lyon), was a mechanician, activist and individualist illegalist anarchist terrorist. Béala actively participated in the Saint-Germain bombing, an attack that plunged France and Europe into the Era of Attacks (1892–1894). Arrested with his accomplices Ravachol, Rosalie Soubère and Charles Simon, he was acquitted by the jury. He was repeatedly brought to trial by the state, facing a new trial after each acquittal. Béala was acquitted three times in total before being sentenced to one year in prison during his fourth trial, this time for harboring Ravachol.

== Biography ==
Joseph Marius Jas-Béala was born in Firminy on 15 August 1865. His mother's name was Marie Déléage, and his father, Joseph Jas-Béala, shared the same name as him. His father worked as a hammerer. Joseph avoided military service due to having flat feet and worked as a mechanic and fitter. In a relationship with the anarchist activist Rosalie Soubère, they hosted their friend Ravachol at their home in Saint-Étienne before the couple moved to Paris with him and stayed at Charles Chaumentin's place. In the Paris region, he joined the 'Égaux de Montmartre' ('The Equals of Montmartre'), a group that included figures such as Ravachol and Auguste Vaillant. According to Jean Vigouroux, it is plausible to consider that this move to the capital was undertaken with the intention of carrying out anarchist attacks.

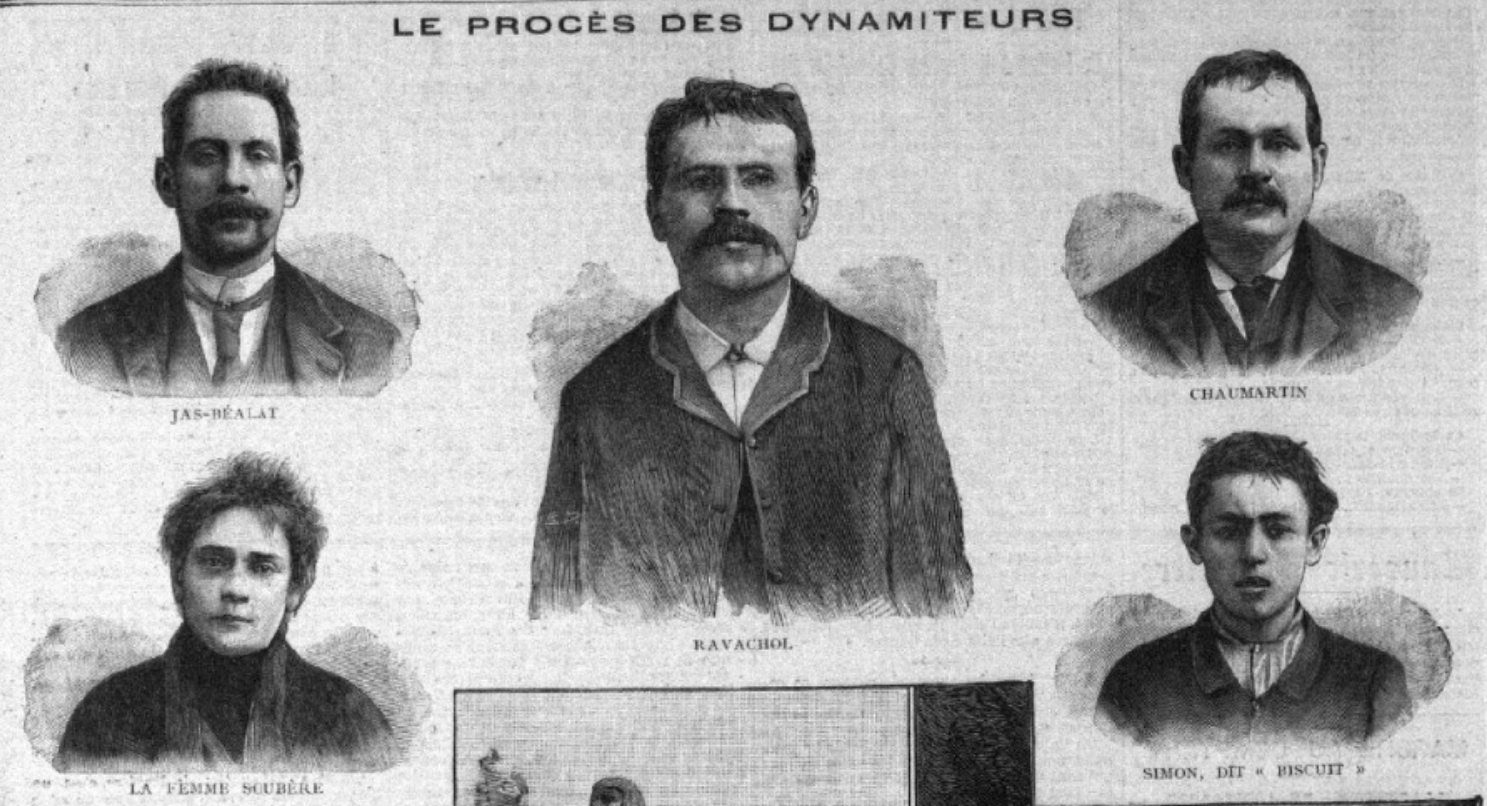
Depiction of Ravachol's band in Le Petit Parisien : supplément illustré (1st May 1892) with the title 'The trial of dynamiters' : Rosalie Soubère, Ravachol, Charles Simon, Joseph Jas-Béala and Charles Chaumartin

Indeed, the group composed of Jas-Béala (Béala), Koënigstein (Ravachol), Soubère (Mariette) and Charles Simon (Biscuit) radicalized following the Clichy affair, during which the police beat and mistreated imprisoned anarchist militants. After the prosecutor in charge of the case, Léon Bulot, requested the death penalty for the incarcerated anarchists, and the judge, Benoît, handed down harsh sentences, the group began preparing an attack aimed at assassinating Benoît.

On the night of 14–15 February 1892, Ravachol and other anarchists, including Béala and the two others of the group according to the police, managed to seize thirty kilograms of dynamite by stealing it from the Soisy-sur-Seine quarry, giving them the possibility to use this significant arsenal in the preparation of attacks. Ravachol and Simon constructed the bomb, Simon carried out an initial reconnaissance of the judge's residence and then the group of four took the tram to carry out the attack on 11 March 1892. Béala was sitted next to Soubère while she transported the bomb, which she concealed under her skirt. After Soubère gave the bomb to Ravachol, Béala remained nearby with her, keeping watch. The militants missed their target, as the bomb exploded without killing or injuring Benoît.

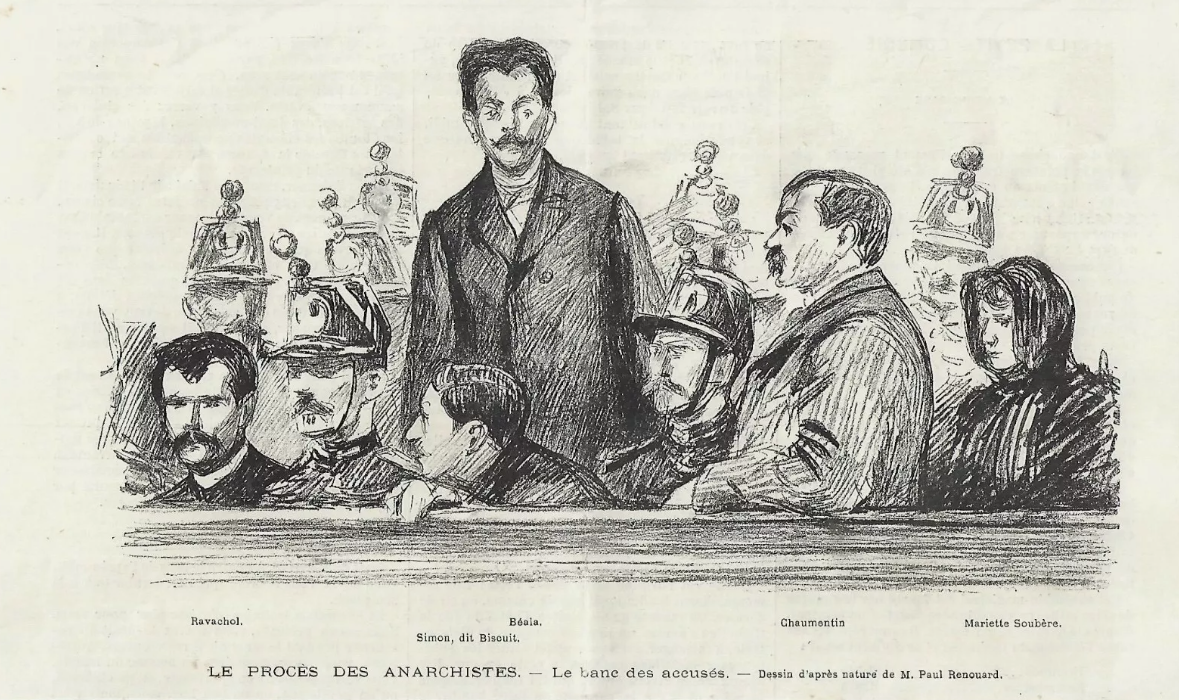
Representation of the trial of Ravachol and his accomplices in L'Illustration (30 April 1892) by Paul Renouard

On 27 March 1892, Ravachol carried out the Clichy bombing, this time targeting the prosecutor Bulot. Ravachol placed his bomb in the building where prosecutor Bulot resided and then left the scene. The bomb exploded, injuring seven people but not affecting Bulot since he was not present in the building. Ravachol was arrested a few days later, having been denounced by Very, the very owner of the café Le Very where he dined.

The four were arrested in the following days by the police and appeared before the Court d'assises of Paris. He was acquitted by the jury along with Soubère, while Ravachol and Simon were found guilty but with mitigating circumstances.

However, the authorities attempted to incarcerate Soubère-Béala, kept them in detention, and first accused them of aiding Ravachol in the murder of two women in Montbrisson. After the acquittal of the three accused by the jury, they accused them again, this time of complicity in concealing the goods from a murder committed by Ravachol. The couple was acquitted once again for the third time. Béala was convicted for the first time during her fourth consecutive trial, this time for harboring Ravachol.

The anarchist received one year in prison, while Soubère was sentenced to seven months, including one for 'contempt of court'.

Béala and Soubère then settled in Saint-Denis on rue de la Briche, living under the names Viala and Gibert to avoid detection. At this time, they worked as newspaper vendors at Le Croissant before moving on to Saint-Étienne.

Jas-Béala also contributed to the writing of Le Réveil des mineurs, a French-language anarchist newspaper aimed at a North American audience. In 1897, he married Marie Barbier in Saint-Étienne.

In the 1920s, he was recorded in Lyon, working as a metallurgist.

He died in Lyon (2nd arrondissement) on 17 June 1940.

== Legacy ==
=== Influence on the launch of the Ère des attentats (1892-1894) ===
The Saint-Germain bombing and the subsequent Clichy bombing, were defining events marking France's entry into the period that the contemporary press and Jean Maitron called the Ère des attentats (1892-1894), a period characterized by great political violence from both the French authorities and the anarchists, and by cycles of escalating violence. The arrest of Ravachol and Simon, and the former's death sentence, were particularly significant in this development.

== Bibliography ==
- Accoce, Pierre (1998). "« Ils ont eu Sadi Carnot ! »" [They got Sadi Carnot!]. Ces assassins qui ont voulu changer l'Histoire. Paris: Plon. ISBN 978-2259189873.
- Maitron, Jean (1955), Histoire du mouvement anarchiste en France (1800-1914) (in French), Paris: Histoire du mouvement anarchiste en France, 1880-1914
- Merriman, John M. (2016). The dynamite club: how a bombing in fin-de-siècle Paris ignited the age of modern terror. Yale University Press. ISBN 978-0-300-21792-6.
