= Charles Simon (anarchist) =

French anarchist militant and illegalist terrorist

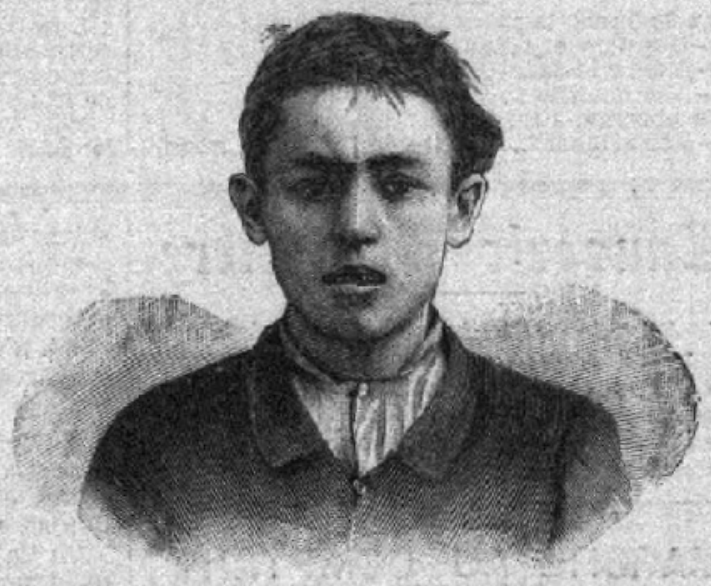
- Depiction of Charles Simon in Le Petit Parisien : supplément illustré (1st May 1892)
- Born: 11 May 1873
- Died: 22 October 1894 (aged 21); Salvation Islands
- Occupation: Anarchist, terrorist, glazier

Charles Simon, nicknamed Biscuit (Cookie) or Ravachol II, (11 May 1873 in Saint-Jean-le-Blanc – 21 or 22 October 1894 at the penal colony of Cayenne) was an anarchist militant and illegalist terrorist, best known for helping to inaugurate the Era of Attacks (1892–1894) alongside Ravachol, Soubère and Jas-Béala by participating in the Saint-Germain bombing. He was killed by the police during the 1894 anarchist convict revolt at the age of 21.

== Biography ==
Charles Achille Simon was born in Saint-Jean-le-Blanc on 11 May 1873. He worked as an apprentice glassmaker. At an unspecified date, he served two months in prison for stealing a sheet of zinc from his employer.

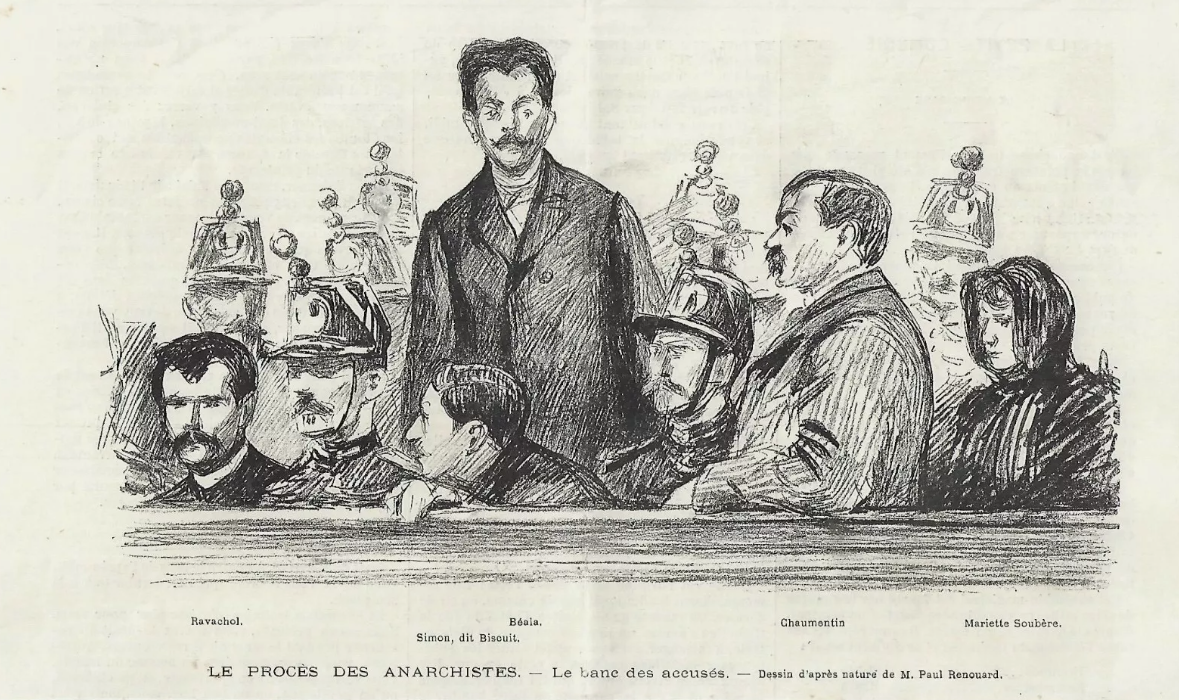
Representation of the trial of Ravachol and his accomplices in L'Illustration (30 April 1892) by Paul Renouard

Simon met Ravachol in Paris around 1890–1891. Simon, nicknamed Biscuit (Cookie), was introduced to him by the Chaumertin couple, with whom Ravachol was residing. They told Ravachol that Simon, then 18 years old, was a militant supporter of propaganda of the deed and that he 'knew the capital like the back of his hand'. Both militants were deeply moved by the Fourmies shooting and the Clichy affair, which took place on 1 May 1891. In the first case, the army fired on demonstrators, and in the second, the police engaged in a gunfight with anarchists and mistreated those arrested afterward.

Simon then decided, along with Ravachol, to avenge the anarchists affected by the Clichy affair. Ravachol stole around 1,500 sticks of dynamite from Soisy-sur-Seine and joined Simon to assemble their first bomb, intended to kill the judge who had sentenced the Clichy anarchists to severe penalties. The two managed to create a first bomb consisting of about 50 sticks of dynamite in Saint-Denis on 7 March 1892.

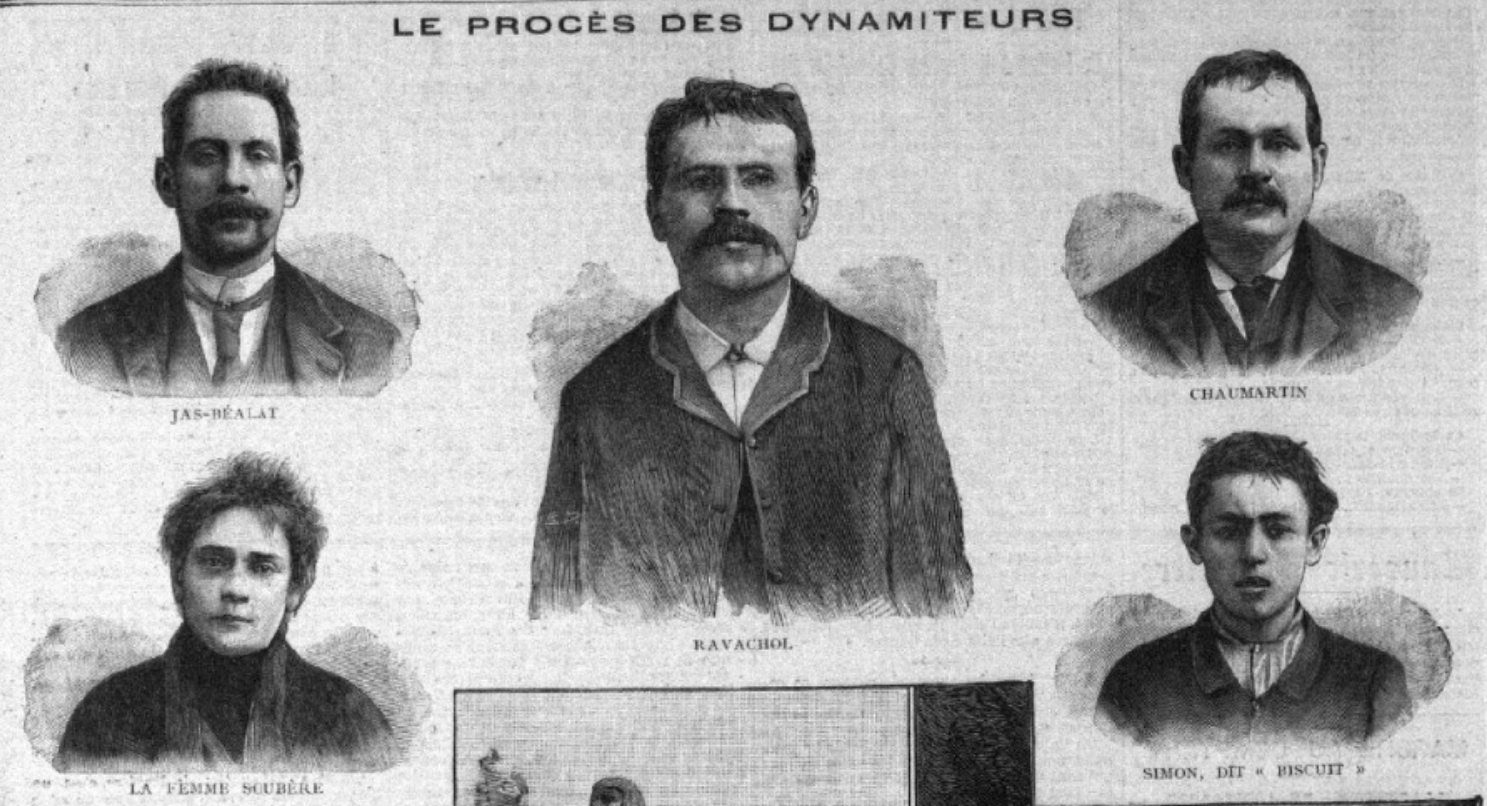
Depiction of Ravachol's band in Le Petit Parisien : supplément illustré (1st May 1892) with the title 'The trial of dynamiters' : Rosalie Soubère, Ravachol, Charles Simon, Joseph Jas-Béala and Charles Chaumartin

On 11 March 1892, he conducted a reconnaissance of Judge Benoît’s house before joining the other conspirators. Accompanied by Ravachol, Jas-Béala and Rosalie Soubère (Mariette), who carried the bomb under her skirt, the group took the tram heading toward their target. Ravachol then placed the bomb, which exploded, slightly injuring one person.

Simon and Ravachol were not satisfied with the failure of their attempt and planned to assassinate Prosecutor Bulot, who had requested the death penalty for the Clichy anarchists. This time, their new bomb consisted of 120 sticks of dynamite, more than double the previous amount. While Ravachol carried out the attempt without killing his target, Simon and the Chaumertins were arrested after being denounced by a police informant.

At the trial, alongside Ravachol, Simon took responsibility for his actions and answered 'Absolutely' when asked if he had participated in the bombings. While 'Biscuit' was his militant pseudonym, he gained the name 'Ravachol II' during the trial. He was sentenced to life imprisonment by the Cour d'assises of the Seine, like Ravachol, who was later sentenced to death. He was deported to the penal colony of Cayenne.

He was killed by the authorities on 21 or 22 October 1894 during the 1894 anarchist convict revolt.

== Bibliography ==
- Merriman, John M. (2016). The dynamite club: how a bombing in fin-de-siècle Paris ignited the age of modern terror. Yale University Press. ISBN 978-0-300-21792-6.
