= Soisy-sur-Seine =

Commune in Île-de-France, France

- Commune
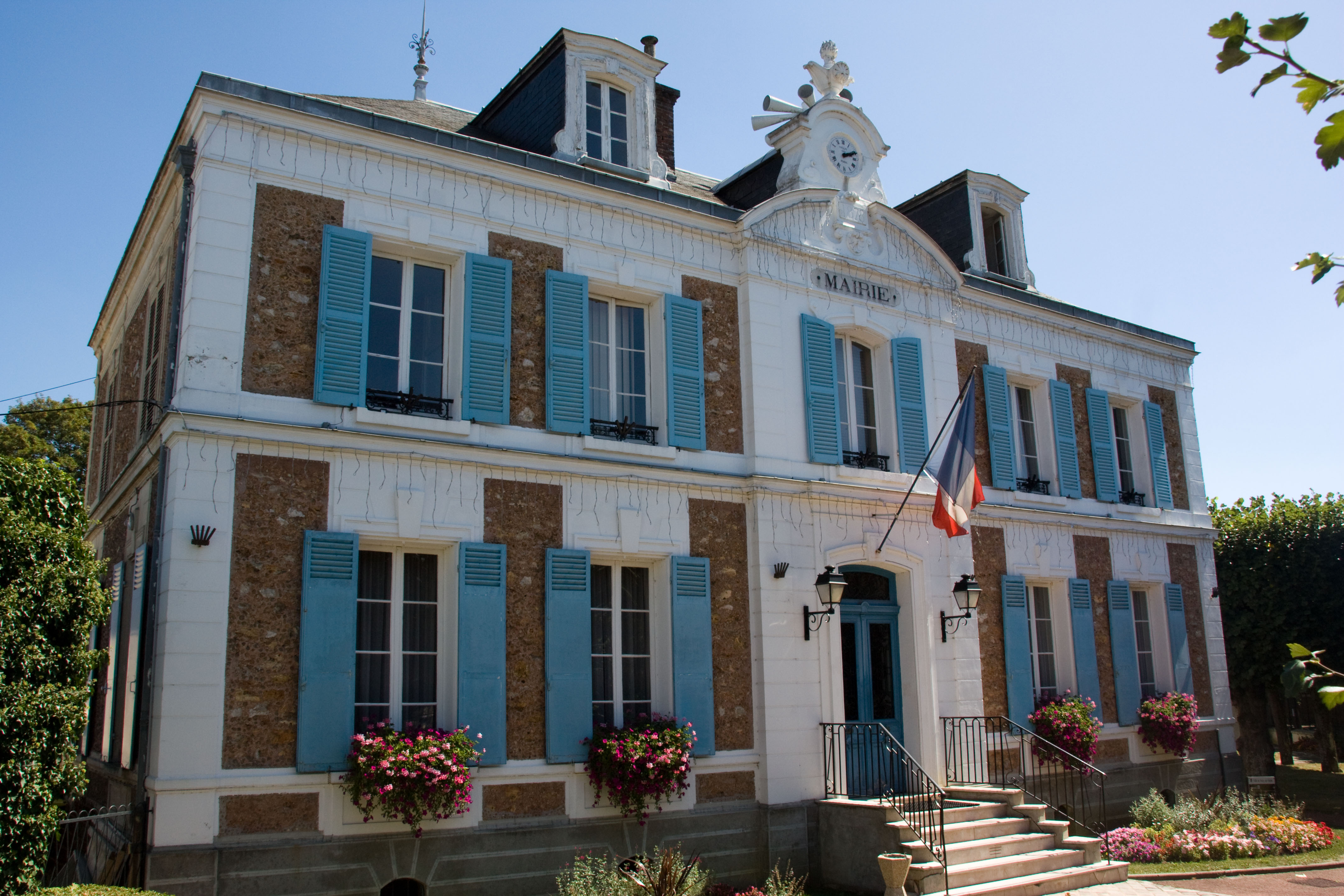
- The town hall in Soisy-sur-Seine

- Coat of arms
- Location of Soisy-sur-Seine
- Location within France Location within Île-de-France (region)
- Coordinates: 48°38′51″N 2°26′56″E
- Country: France
- Region: Île-de-France
- Department: Essonne
- Arrondissement: Évry
- Canton: Draveil
- Intercommunality: CA Grand Paris Sud Seine-Essonne-Sénart

Government
  - Mayor (2020–2026): Jean-Baptiste Rousseau
- Area^{1}: 8.56 km^{2} (3.31 sq mi)
- Highest elevation: 86 m (282 ft)
- Lowest elevation: 32 m (105 ft)
- Population (2023): 7,418
  - Density: 867/km^{2} (2,240/sq mi)
- Demonym: Soiséens
- Time zone: UTC+01:00 (CET)
  - Summer (DST): UTC+02:00 (CEST)
- INSEE/Postal code: 91600 /91450
- Website: www.soisysurseine.fr
- ^{1} French Land Register data, which excludes lakes, ponds, glaciers > 1 km^{2} (0.386 sq mi or 247 acres) and river estuaries.

Soisy-sur-Seine (French pronunciation: [swazi syʁ sɛn]; lit. 'Soisy-on-Seine') is a commune in the southeastern outer suburbs of Paris. It is 19 km (11.8 mi) from the centre of Paris in the Essonne department in Île-de-France in north-central France.

== Population ==
Inhabitants of Soisy-sur-Seine are known as Soiséens in French.

Historical population
Year	Pop.	±% p.a.
1968	2,405	—
1975	3,459	+5.33%
1982	6,201	+8.70%
1990	7,145	+1.79%
1999	7,072	−0.11%
2007	7,200	+0.22%
2012	6,795	−1.15%
2017	7,154	+1.04%
2023	7,418	+0.61%
Source: INSEE

== See also ==
- Communes of the Essonne department
