= John M. Merriman =

American historian (1946–2022)

- Merriman c. 2015
- Born: June 15, 1946; Battle Creek, Michigan, U.S.
- Died: May 22, 2022 (aged 75); New Haven, Connecticut, U.S.
- Spouse: Carol Payne (m. 1980; died 2016)
- Children: 2

Academic background
- Education: University of Michigan (BA, PhD)
- Thesis: Radicalization and Repression: The Experience of the Limousin, 1848-1851 (1972)
- Academic advisor: Charles Tilly

Academic work
- Discipline: French and Modern European history
- Institutions: Yale University

John Mustard Merriman (June 15, 1946 – May 22, 2022) was an American historian specializing in modern French history. He was a Charles Seymour Professor of History at Yale University.

== Early life and education ==
Merriman was born on June 15, 1946, in Battle Creek, Michigan. His mother, Sally Mustard, was a portrait and landscape painter. He did not know his father, Robert Merriman, who was divorced from his mother when John was 2. He grew up in Portland, Oregon, where he attended a Jesuit all-boys secondary school, although he did not consider himself religious. He attended the University of Michigan, where he obtained his B.A. in History in 1968 and Ph.D. in 1972, under Charles Tilly, and gained a life-long passion for French culture and history.

== Career ==
Merriman formed many of his political views during the volatile Vietnam years; he described himself as "virulently anti-establishment" and his favorite musicians The Rolling Stones, iconic of the counterculture of the 1960s, influenced his writing habits, "[I've] never written a thing without a record on." He became "a practitioner of history from the ground up", sometimes called microhistory, that came into vogue during the 1970s.

His books include The Dynamite Club: How a Bombing in the Fin-De-Siecle Paris Ignited the Age of Modern Terror (2009) about the French Anarchist Emile Henry (1872–1894), Massacre: The Life and Death of the Paris Commune (2014) focusing on the Paris Commune of 1871, particularly on "The Bloody Week"; and Ballad of the Anarchist Bandits: The Crime Spree that Gripped Belle Epoque Paris (2017) a story of the Bonnot Gang. "John Merriman became our greatest historian of the French left and its repression, of the Communards, the Anarchists, and the French police", according to historian Alice Kaplan. He also authored A History of Modern Europe since the Renaissance (1996 & 2002), a survey text for undergraduate history classes, it has been used by over a quarter million students. According to historian Peter McPhee, "His books are characterized by a quite extraordinary knowledge of place: no other French historian—and only a handful of French historians—has had such a rich understanding of the diversity of French cities."

Merriman taught French and Modern European history and first began teaching at Yale as an assistant professor in 1973, and taught there until his death.

In 2009, he received the Medal of Meritorious Service to Polish Education for his work advancing a multi-university inquiry called Recovering Forgotten History in Poland. In 2017, the American Historical Association gave Merriman the Lifetime Achievement Award for Scholarly Distinction.

He was popular with students and received two undergraduate teaching awards from Yale, the Harwood F. Byrnes-Richard B. Sewall Prize for Teaching Excellence in 2000, and the Phi Beta Kappa Devane Medal for excellence in teaching and scholarship in 2019. Students remembered how he used his storytelling skills to animate his lectures, "He'd walk in with a few crumpled pieces of paper, walk back and forth, jump from one subject to another, and after two or three hours you’d really gotten somewhere," said former student and later history professor Judith Coffin. Author Ta-Nehisi Coates, who watched his lectures online, described his style as like a "freestyle rapper" who riffed off his material and "had this weird ability to inhabit the history."

He was the seventh master of Branford College (1983–1991).

== Personal life ==
In 1980, he married Carol Virginia Payne. They had two children, Laura and Christopher. His wife died in 2016.

In 1987, he and his wife bought a historic medieval house in Balazuc in southern France. He lived part of each year with his family in the village and wrote the only English language history of it, The Stones of Balazuc: A French Village in Time (2002). Merriman's love for Balazuc was well known. His former mentee historian David A. Bell said, “The minute the Yale semester was over, he headed [to Balazuc], sat around in cafes and talked to people into the small hours.”

Merriman died from complications of bladder cancer and multiple myeloma in New Haven, Connecticut on May 22, 2022, at the age of 75.

== Published works ==
=== Books ===
- The Agony of the Republic: the repression of the left in revolutionary France, 1848–1851. New Haven, CT: Yale University Press. 1978. ISBN 0-300-02151-8. OCLC 3204823.
- The Red City: Limoges and the French nineteenth century. New York: Oxford University Press. 1985. ISBN 1-4237-5836-6. OCLC 252540148.
- The Margins of City Life: explorations on the French urban frontier, 1815-1851. New York: Oxford University Press. 1991. ISBN 0-19-506438-0. OCLC 21334885.
- A History of Modern Europe: from the Renaissance to the Present. New York. 2010. ISBN 978-0-393-93433-5. OCLC 320193499.
- The Stones of Balazuc: a French village in time. New York: W.W. Norton & Co. 2002. ISBN 0-393-05113-7. OCLC 48837626. available in French as Mémoires de pierres, Balazuc, village ardéchois (in French). Translated by Bardos, Jean-Pierre. Paris: Tallandier. 2005. ISBN 2-84734-109-9. OCLC 420408077.
- Police stories: building the French state, 1815-1851. New York: Oxford University Press. 2006. ISBN 1-4237-6124-3. OCLC 65192677.
- The Dynamite Club: how a bombing in fin-de-siècle Paris ignited the age of modern terror. New Haven, CT. 2016. ISBN 978-0-300-21793-3. OCLC 942753105.
- Massacre: The Life and Death of the Paris Commune. New York: Basic Books. 2014. ISBN 9780465020171. OCLC 873007674.
- Ballad of the anarchist bandits: the crime spree that gripped Belle Époque Paris. New York. 2017. ISBN 978-1-56858-988-6. OCLC 1004671291.

=== Edited books ===
- 1830 in France. New York: New Viewpoints. 1975. ISBN 978-0-531-05373-7. OCLC 1366220.
- Consciousness and Class Experience in Nineteenth-Century Europe. New York: Holmes & Meier. 1979. ISBN 0-8419-0444-8. OCLC 5101155.
- French Cities in the Nineteenth Century. London: Hutchinson. 1982. ISBN 0-09-145200-7. OCLC 8391516.
- Merriman, John M.; McCabe, Charles (1985). For Want of a Horse: Choice and Chance in History. Lexington, Mass.: S. Greene Press. ISBN 0-86616-049-3. OCLC 11091354.
- McClain, James L.; Merriman, John M.; Ugawa, Kaoru (1994). Edo and Paris: Urban Life and the State in the Early Modern Era. Ithaca: Cornell University Press. ISBN 0-8014-2987-0. OCLC 30157716.
- Van Loon, Hendrik Willem; Merriman, John M. (1999) [1921]. The Story of Mankind. New York: Liveright. ISBN 0-87140-171-1. OCLC 39069525.
- Merriman, John M.; Winter, J. M. (2006). Europe 1789 to 1914: Encyclopedia of the Age of Industry and Empire. Detroit: Scribner. ISBN 978-0-684-31496-9. OCLC 76769541. and Merriman, John M.; Winter, J. M. (2006). Europe since 1914: encyclopedia of the age of war and reconstruction. Detroit. ISBN 978-0-684-31497-6. OCLC 76769559.

=== Lectures ===
- (Video) HIST 276: France Since 1871 (Fall 2007), by John Merriman at Open Yale Courses.
- (Video) HIST 202: European Civilization, 1648–1945 (Fall 2008), by John Merriman at Open Yale Courses.
