= The Dynamite Club =

2009 book by John Merriman

- Author: John M. Merriman
- Publication date: 2009

The Dynamite Club: How a Bombing in Fin-de-Siècle Paris Ignited the Age of Modern Terror is a 2009 history book by John M. Merriman.

== See also ==
- Ère des attentats
