= Timeline of the Ère des attentats =

Timeline

This page presents all events related to the Ère des attentats (English: Era of Attacks) from 1892 to 1894.

== General overview ==
This timeline is largely based on the list provided by Hélène Millot, with additional references from the more comprehensive works of John M. Merriman and Vivien Bouhey. The start and end dates of the period follow Millot's framework, beginning with the Saint-Germain bombing (11 March 1892) and ending with the massacre of anarchist convicts (22 October 1894). However, Bouhey offers a broader perspective, considering the period from 1890 to 1894, which is not adopted here. The Fourmies massacre and the Clichy affair are included in the timeline, as most sources regard these two events as immediate precursors to the Ère des attentats.

== Events ==
Judicial affair - Legal repression
Anarchist attack
Execution - Massacre

Date	Event	Place	Instigator(s)	Outcome	References
1 May 1891	Massacre at Fourmies	(France) Fourmies	French state; French army	Massacre of a dozen peaceful demonstrators in Fourmies; 9 dead, at least 35 injured	
1 May 1891	Clichy affair	(France) Paris	French state; French police	Violent arrest of three anarchists; High-profile trial which radicalised the anarchists through its harshness	
29 February 1892	Saint-Dominique bombing	(France) Paris	French anarchist (?)	Explosion in a wealthy residence on rue Saint-Dominique, in Paris; 0 dead, 0 injured	
11 March 1892	Saint-Germain bombing	(France) Paris	François Koenigstein (Ravachol); Rosalie Soubère (Mariette); Joseph Jas-Béala (Béala); Charles Simon (Biscuit)	Symbolic start of the Ère des attentats; They failed to kill or injure Edmond Benoît, the judge presiding over the trial of the accused in the Clichy affair; 0 dead, 1 injured.; Shift from ‘person-based’ terrorism to ‘location-based’ terrorism	
15 March 1892	Lobau bombing	(France) Paris	Théodule Meunier (Pied Plat)	0 dead, 0 injured.; Shift from ‘person-based’ terrorism to ‘location-based’ terrorism	
27 March 1892	Clichy bombing	(France) Paris	Ravachol	0 dead, 6 injured.; Failed to kill or injure Bulot, the prosecutor in the Clichy affair.; Shift from ‘person-based’ terrorism to ‘location-based’ terrorism	
30 March 1892	Arrest of Ravachol	(France) Paris	French state; French police; Jean-Marie Véry	After being denounced by the owner of the restaurant Le Véry, Ravachol was arrested.; The other members of Ravachol's group had already been arrested.	
25 April 1892	Véry bombing	(France) Paris	Théodule Meunier; Jean-Pierre François (Francis); Pieds plats	Explosion at the restaurant Le Véry targeting the owner, who was killed.; 2 dead, at least 1 injured.	
26 April 1892	First trial of Ravachol	(France) Paris	French state; French justice system	Rosalie Soubère and Joseph Jas-Béala acquitted. Charles Simon and Ravachol sentenced to penal labour for life.; High-profile trial that radicalised the anarchists	
21 June 1892	Second trial of Ravachol	(France) Montbrison	French state; French justice system	Ravachol sentenced to death.	
11 July 1892	Execution of Ravachol	(France) Montbrison	French state	Ravachol was guillotined.; He became a martyr for the anarchists, who radicalised in response to his execution	
August 1892	Carmaux strike	(France) Carmaux	French state; French army	The army intervened in the Carmaux mine to force the workers back to work.	
22 September 1892	Murder of the Little Pastry Chef	(France) Saint-Denis	Henri Meyrueis; Bernard Chappuliot; David Altéran (?)	Murder of the police informant 'Little Pastry Chef' in Saint-Denis.	
8 November 1892	Carmaux-Bons Enfants bombing	(France) Paris	Émile Henry; Adrienne Chailliey (?)	Henry sent a bomb to the headquarters of the Compagnie minière de Carmaux in response to the strike; it exploded at the police station.; 5 dead (4 police officers and 1 civilian), no injuries.; Most lethal attack of the Ère des attentats.	
13 November 1893	13 November 1893 stabbing	(France) Paris	Léon Léauthier	Stabbed diplomat Rista Georgievich ‘because he looked bourgeois’.; 0 dead, 1 wounded.; A founding attack of modern terrorism, one of the first indiscriminate attacks in history.	
9 December 1893	National Assembly bombing	(France) Paris	Auguste Vaillant	Threw his bomb into the French National Assembly.; Several people were slightly injured (including Vaillant) but no one was killed. The session of the Assembly continued even after the attack.	
12 December 1893	First loi scélérate ('villainous law')	France	French state; French lawmakers	Law against freedom of the press. Introduced the criminalisation of the 'incitement to terrorism' and cut out parts of the presumption of innocence.	
18 December 1893	Second loi scélérate ('villainous law')	France	French state; French lawmakers	Law against criminal organisations. Any agreement to commit terrorist acts, even if they are not committed, is criminalised.	
1 January 1894	Repression of January and February 1894	France	French state	Start of a vast crackdown targeting anarchists, arresting hundreds of them.; Radicalizes the anarchists that manage to escape the police, often the most radical ones.	
10 January 1894	Trial of Auguste Vaillant	(France) Paris	French state; French justice system	Auguste Vaillant was condemned to death.	
5 February 1894	Execution of Auguste Vaillant	(France) Paris	French state	Auguste Vaillant was guillotined.	
12 February 1894	Café Terminus bombing	(France) Paris	Émile Henry	Attempted to assassinate President Sadi Carnot to avenge Vaillant but failed, choosing instead to detonate his bomb in a Parisian café.; A founding act of modern terrorism, one of the first indiscriminate attacks in history.; 1 dead, 17 injured.	
15 February 1894	Greenwich Observatory bombing	(United Kingdom) Greenwich	Martial Bourdin	Attempted to plant a bomb at the Greenwich Observatory but died from the explosion.; Louise Michel gave the eulogy at his funeral.; 1 dead, 0 injured.	
20 February 1894	20 February bombings	(France) Paris	Désiré Pauwels	Sought to avenge Ravachol and Henry, who was his friend.; Bomb trapped two rooms and asked the police to come.; 1 dead (the concierge), 1 injured (a police officer)	
23 February 1894	Trial of Léon Léauthier	(France) Paris	French state; French justice system	Léon Léauthier sentenced to life in penal labor.	
15 March 1894	Madeleine bombing	(France) Paris	Désiré Pauwels	Pauwels went to the Madeleine church with a bomb but blew himself up with it. He probably committed suicide shortly afterwards.; 1 dead, Pauwels, 0 injured.; Shift from ‘person-based’ terrorism to ‘location-based’ terrorism	
4 April 1894	Foyot bombing	(France) Paris	French police (?); Okhrana (?)	Either the French police or the Okhrana (Russian secret police) target the anarchist couple Laurent Tailhade and Julia Miahle.	
27 April 1894	Trial of Émile Henry	(France) Paris	French state; French justice system	Émile Henry sentenced to death.	
19 May 1894	1894 Marseille stabbing	(France) Marseille	Célestin Nat	Nat stabbed a bourgeois on the Quai des Augustins in Marseille to avenge Henry's death sentence.; 0 dead, 1 injured.	
21 May 1894	Execution of Émile Henry	(France) Paris	French state	Émile Henry is guillotined.	
24 June 1894	Assassination of Sadi Carnot	(France) Lyon	Sante Geronimo Caserio	Caserio stabbed and killed the President of the French Republic, Sadi Carnot.	
24-26 June 1894	1894 anti-Italian riots	(France) Lyon	French nationalists; Frenchmen	Following Caserio's assassination, ethnic violence targeting Italians erupts in the city of Lyon.; Over the two next days, dozens of Italian owned properties and buildings are ransacked, pillaged or burned down.	
26 July 1894	Trial of Théodule Meunier	(France) Paris	French state; French justice system	Théodule Meunier sentenced to life in penal labour.	
28 July 1894	Third loi scélérate ('villainous law')	(France) Paris	French state; French lawmakers	Ban on anarchist propaganda and press.	
2 August 1894	Trial of Sante Geronimo Caserio	(France) Lyon	French state; French justice system	Sante Geronimo Caserio sentenced to death.	
3 August 1894	Trial of Célestin Nat	(France) Marseille	French state; French justice system	Célestin Nat sentenced to 20 years in penal labour.	
16 August 1894	Execution of Sante Caserio	(France) Lyon	French state	Caserio was guillotined.	
22 October 1894	Massacre of anarchist convicts	(France) Salvation Islands	French state; French colonial and concentrationary administration	Organization of a plot within the Île Saint-Joseph penal colony to assassinate the anarchist convicts.; The massacre resulted in 12 deaths among the prisoners and 4 among the guards. Among the anarchists, Charles Simon and Léon Léauthier were killed.	

== Bibliography ==
- Berthoud, Joël (1969). L'attentat contre Carnot et ses rapports avec le mouvement anarchiste des années 90 (mémoire) [The attack on Carnot and it's relationship with the anarchist movement of the 1890s (memory)] (PDF) (in French).
- Bouhey, Vivien (2009), Les Anarchistes contre la République [The Anarchists against the Republic], Rennes: Presses universitaires de Rennes (PUR)
- Chambost, Anne-Sophie (2017), "" Nous ferons de notre pire… ". Anarchie, illégalisme … et lois scélérates" [«We’ll Do our Worse». Anarchy, Illegalism … and Evil Law], Droit et Cultures, 74 (2): 65–87, doi:10.4000/droitcultures.4264
- Delpech, Jean-Marc (2006), Parcours et réseaux d'un anarchiste : Alexandre Marius Jacob : 1879-1954 (PhD thesis) [The life and networks of an anarchist: Alexandre Marius Jacob: 1879-1954] (PDF), Nancy: Université de Nancy 2
- Ferragu, Gilles (2019), "L'écho des bombes : l'invention du terrorisme « à l'aveugle » (1893-1895)" [The echo of bombs: The invention of indiscriminate terrorism (1893–1895)], Ethnologie française, 49 (1): 21–31, doi:10.3917/ethn.191.0021
- Frémion, Yves (2011), Léauthier l'anarchiste. De la propagande par le fait à la révolte des bagnards (1893-1894) [Léauthier the anarchist. From propaganda by the deed to the convicts' revolt (1893-1894)], Paris: L'Échappée, ISBN 9782915830477
- Merriman, John M. (2016). The dynamite club: how a bombing in fin-de-siècle Paris ignited the age of modern terror. Yale University Press. ISBN 978-0-300-21792-6.
- Oriol, Philippe (1993). À propos de l'attentat Foyot [à Paris] : quelques questions et quelques tentatives de réponse [About the Foyot bombing [in Paris]: some questions and some attempts at answers] (in French). Paris: Au Fourneau. ISBN 978-2-86288-400-4.
- Piarotas, Mireille (2000). Regards populaires sur la violence [Popular looks at violence]. Saint Etienne (France): Presses Universitaires de Saint-Etienne (PUSE). ISBN 978-2862721804.
- Salomé, Karine (2011), L'Ouragan homicide : L'attentat politique en France au XIXe siècle [The homicidal Hurricane: political assassination in 19th century France], Paris: Champ Vallon / Epoque, ISBN 978-2-87673-538-5
