= Revolt of Saint-Joseph =

1894 massacre in French Guiana

- Part of Ère des attentats
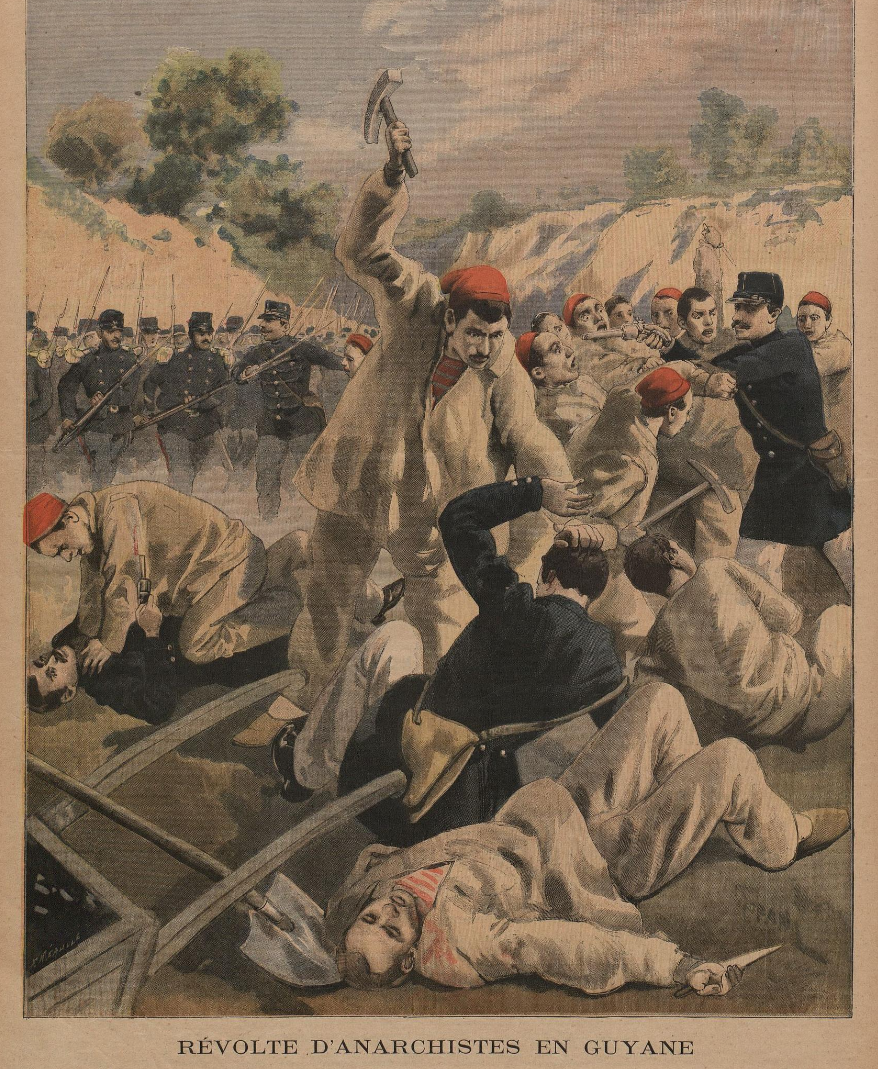
- Representation of the revolt in Le Petit Journal (16 December 1894), an image based on the account given by the French authorities
- Date: October 21, 1894
- Location: French Guiana; 5°16′53″N 52°34′59″W
- Goals: massacre of the anarchists convicts in the penal colony
- Methods: summary executions
- Result: French victory

Parties
(France) France; French colonial administration French army	Anarchists; Other convicts

Lead figures
	Léon Léauthier †; Charles Simon †

Number
Several hundreds	800 (according to the French state); 15 (modern estimates)

Casualties and losses
4 deaths (according to the French state); 2 deaths, 2 injured (modern estimates)	12

The Revolt of Saint-Joseph, or the 1894 massacre of anarchist bagnards, was a mutiny and massacre of anarchist bagnards that took place from 21 to 23 October 1894 on Saint-Joseph Island, one of the Salvation Islands. It was partly orchestrated by the French colonial and concentrationary authorities, who supported a plot aimed at inciting the anarchists to revolt and escape, which would have given them a pretext to assassinate them. However, the anarchists withdrew from the plot as soon as they realized it was a trap.

Frustrated by the failure of the conspiracy, two guards decided to murder the first two anarchists they encountered. This assassination triggered a revolt involving about fifteen convicts, mostly anarchists, who gathered and attacked the two guards with improvised weapons. The French troops, already prepared to intervene, quickly regained control of the penal colony and summarily executed a number of anarchists. Charles Simon and Léon Léauthier were among the twelve convicts killed, while the two guards and two of their accomplices were killed.

The French state subsequently engaged in a cover-up of the event, claiming that the revolt had been initiated without reason by the anarchists, that their executions were justified, and that the number of insurgents was not around fifteen but closer to 800. Historiographically, this massacre marks the end of the Ère des attentats (1892-1894).

== History ==
=== Context ===
Since the end of the Paris Commune (1871), repression targeting anarchists in France had only intensified. Initially met with little response from anarchist circles, this repression led, from the early 1890s onward, to significant changes both in France and among anarchists. Following the Clichy affair and the Fourmies massacre (1891), some anarchists came to believe that revenge against those perceived as responsible for their repression was legitimate. A number of them thus engaged in the Ère des attentats (1892-1894), a period during which France was struck by numerous anarchist attacks. Rather than seeking to ease tensions, the French state intensified its repression, particularly with the lois scélérates (1893-1894).

In this context, a number of anarchists were deported to the penal colony in French Guiana, on the Salvation Islands, between Saint-Joseph Island and Royale Island. There, they were confined in huts and viewed with deep hatred by the concentrationary and colonial authorities of Guiana, who considered that the French justice system was too lenient with these convicts and that they should have been sentenced to death instead.

=== Beginning, assassination ===
These conflicts between guards and convicts escalated when a guard named Mosca coldly shot and killed an imprisoned anarchist named Jean-Baptiste Briens during a roll call. Mosca was hated by the anarchists of the penal colony for this act, and following the advice of Eugène Allmeyer—a criminal notorious for his escapes but also close to the concentrationary authorities—a plot was gradually developed among the anarchists to escape by assassinating this guard.

The conspiracy was soon joined by a certain Plista, who was not a revolutionary and was in the service of the French authorities. He relayed all the details of the plan to the administration, which became fully aware of the intended course of the mutiny and the escape, even encouraging the anarchists to attempt it. Realizing that Plista was unreliable and collaborating with the authorities, the anarchists withdrew from the plan. Some had suspected the conspiracy nearly a month in advance and requested transfers to Royale Island up to three weeks before the massacre, but their requests were denied.

=== Mutiny and massacre ===
On the eve of the planned revolt, 20 October 1894, the chief overseer of Royale Island, Courtois, spoke of the 'organized massacre' set for the next day, making it highly unlikely that the massacre was not premeditated by the French authorities. However, the next day, although the region’s military governor had prepared troops to intervene as soon as the revolt began in order to massacre the anarchists, the uprising did not take place. Guards Mosca and Crétaillaz, who had waited for much of the day without any developments, were deeply frustrated by the turn of events. They went to the island accompanied by two convicts who acted as their underlings. Once there, they entered the first hut they found and killed the first two anarchists inside. The anarchists gathered quickly, held a brief discussion, and decided to take action, led by Charles Simon (Cookie) and Marpeaux. A group of about fifteen conspirators assembled and attacked the guards and their accomplices using improvised 'iron spikes'. Both guards were killed. The underlings were either killed or merely wounded.

Chaos quickly erupted on the concentrationary island. Most of the 800 convicts sought refuge in their huts, while the fifteen insurgents fled. At the same time, the remaining guards also retreated, barricading themselves inside their buildings. In reality, they were waiting for the army to intervene, which arrived shortly afterward. As soon as he regained control of the penal colony, the camp’s governor, Billet, gave the order:

Stay calm, fire everywhere, no mercy!

Billet’s proposed plan proved difficult to execute because the army had arrived, bringing with it military doctors who were potential witnesses capable of relaying information to the French public. As a result, the camp guards and troops did not enter the huts to massacre the convicts. Instead, they decided to organize a manhunt across the island the next day—since it was already 10 P.M. and darkness had fallen—to capture the fleeing anarchists.

The following morning, on 22 October 1894, the troops set out. They first found Simon (Cookie), who had taken refuge in a tree. A soldier asked him whether he preferred to be shot “in the ass or the head?” to which Simon replied, “Long live anarchy!” before being executed.

Later that day, the army discovered Léon Léauthier along with two of his companions, Maxime Lebeault and Maservin, near the rocky coastline. None of the three were armed, but they seem to have understood that they were about to be summarily executed. As soon as they saw the soldiers, they embraced, tore their clothes, and awaited their execution—an act that was carried out shortly after. All three shouted the same words as Simon as they were shot.

Other anarchists and convicts were killed throughout the day, although the exact chronological order remains unclear. In addition to Simon and the three anarchists already mentioned, the full list of victims is as follows. The first two sought refuge in a cave, were smoked out alive, attempted to escape, and were shot while fleeing. For the others, the circumstances of their deaths remain unknown:

- Maxime Thiervoz, not an anarchist
- Henri-Pierre Meyrueis, anarchist (sentenced for the murder of the Little Pastry Chef)
- Benoît Chevenet, anarchist, friend of Ravachol and Simon
- Boésie, not an anarchist
- Jules Garnier, anarchist
- Marpeaux, anarchist

=== Aftermath ===
After the massacre, the anarchists who had refused to take part in the attempt were rounded up and placed in solitary confinement. The final death toll among the convicts was twelve, as a certain Pigache was executed a few days later. On the guards’ side, official reports listed four deaths, though more recent research suggests there were actually two deaths (the guards) and two wounded (the two prisoners that helped the guards).

The French press, particularly Le Petit Journal, reported the events based on the authorities' account, which claimed that around 800 anarchists had spontaneously revolted and attacked their guards. In reality, it appears that the massacre was premeditated by the French authorities and that only about fifteen convicts took part in the mutiny, most of whom were killed in the process.

== Historiography ==
According to Hélène Millot, this event marks the end of the Ère des attentats.

== See also ==
- Timeline of the Ère des attentats

== Bibliography ==
- Bouhey, Vivien (2009), Les Anarchistes contre la République [The Anarchists against the Republic], Rennes: Presses universitaires de Rennes (PUR)
- Chambost, Anne-Sophie (2017), "« Nous ferons de notre pire… ». Anarchie, illégalisme … et lois scélérates" [«We’ll Do our Worse». Anarchy, Illegalism … and Evil Law], Droit et Cultures, 74 (2): 65–87, doi:10.4000/droitcultures.4264
- Frémion, Yves (2011), Léauthier l'anarchiste. De la propagande par le fait à la révolte des bagnards (1893-1894) [Léauthier the anarchist. From propaganda by the deed to the convicts' revolt (1893-1894)], Paris: L'Échappée, ISBN 9782915830477
- Merriman, John M. (2016). The dynamite club: how a bombing in fin-de-siècle Paris ignited the age of modern terror. Yale University Press. ISBN 978-0-300-21792-6.
- Piarotas, Mireille (2000). Regards populaires sur la violence [Popular looks at violence]. Saint Etienne (France): Presses Universitaires de Saint-Etienne (PUSE). ISBN 978-2862721804.
- Portet, Valérie (1995), Les anarchistes dans les bagnes de Guyane de 1887 à 1914 : Comportement et perception de l'univers concentrationnaire (maîtrise thesis) [Anarchists in the penal colonies of Guyana from 1887 to 1914: Behaviour and perception of the concentration camp universe], Nanterre: Université Paris X - Nanterre, p. 276
