= Today or Tomorrow =

1892 essay by Louise Michel

- Today or Tomorrow in the Archives anarchistes collections
- Author: Louise Michel
- Original title: Aujourd'hui ou demain
- Language: French
- Subject: Anarchy; Ravachol; Propaganda of the deed
- Genre: Political philosophy
- Published: 1892
- Publisher: L'En-Dehors
- Publication place: France

"Today or Tomorrow" (French: Aujourd'hui ou demain) is an essay published on 17 July 1892, by the anarchist Louise Michel in l'Endehors. Michel wrote it at the beginning of the Ère des attentats (1892–1894), on the eve of Ravachol's execution. She presents him as an avenger who came to liberate humanity and could lead it to a new era—more broadly, Michel's intent is to pay tribute to this figure and reaffirm her support for propaganda of the deed and insurrectionary anarchism, which she saw as the preferred paths to revolution.

Michel remains influenced by the usual visions of her time and circles; she genders anarchist terrorism in the masculine and compares Ravachol to Jesus Christ, like other anarchist figures of her period.

== Context ==
In France, relations between the authorities and anarchists became increasingly strained due to the heavy repression anarchists faced in the 1880s. In that context, anarchists began to explore new questions: 'Is the use of violence legitimate in the anarchist struggle? And if it is legitimate, to what extent?'

Michel gradually moved closer to anarchism and fully embraced it in 1887 during the Clément Duval affair, the founder of illegalism who was arrested after a burglary in which he set fire to his victim's home. His death sentence seemed to her a declaration of war from the state, which needed to be opposed by all means necessary to secure his release. She felt it did not matter if she were shot, as anarchist vengeance would only grow stronger.

Following the Fourmies massacre and the Clichy affair in 1891, a number of anarchists in France decided to engage in terrorist actions against the presumed perpetrators of their repression, marking the beginning of the Ère des attentats (1892–1894). One of the first terrorists of this period, who targeted the magistrates involved in the Clichy affair, François Ravachol, was arrested and sent to the guillotine on 11 July 1892, transforming him into a martyr and hero of the anarchist cause.

The anarchist activist published her text in L'En-dehors on 17 July 1892 under the title Today or Tomorrow.

== Contents ==
=== Rehabilitating and commemorating Ravachol ===
Michel begins her text by contrasting state violence with revolutionary violence, using the example of Ravachol's execution. She highlights the fact that such militants sacrifice their lives for the common good—explaining why she portrays the anarchist as a kind of 'sacrificed Messiah', despite being an atheist. Her literary choices lead her to compare the accounts of both executions; for instance, she speaks of 'the trails of blood left by Deibler from one city to another [which] mark the path of the executioners', comparing the executioner Louis Deibler to Pontius Pilate and his political assassinations.

Moreover, Ravachol is surrounded by an entire lexical field of eternity by the author, who depicts him as the possible instigator of a new era, driven by the vengeance that will arise from his death and the popular uprisings that may follow.

=== Theories ===
More broadly, Michel uses this text to advocate propaganda of the deed and insurrectiony anarchism as her preferred means of conducting the anarchist struggle. Terrorist acts are seen as liberating, and it is through propaganda of the deed that the best chances of 'opening a breach between the old world and the new humanity' can be achieved, according to her.

The author also introduces a certain form of anarchist humankind-based social Darwinism, portraying Ravachol as fighting for his survival.

=== Shared aspects ===
Today or Tomorrow is marked by a series of common elements also found in the anarchist circles in which Michel was active, such as a masculine vision of terrorism and anarchist struggle—Ravachol is, for example, portrayed as a 'father' from whom avenging sons would be born. Marie-Pierre Tardif notes that the imagery deployed in the text is highly masculine.

Moreover, the comparison of Ravachol to Jesus Christ is made by other anarchist authors of the period, although, apart from Michel, it is often intellectual figures with relatively loose ties to anarchism who draw this parallel.

== Legacy ==
The autograph manuscript of the work, which she wrote on 10 July 1892, the day before Ravachol's execution, was sold for 9,000 euros in an auction in the early 21st century.

== Online versions ==
- Original published version (French) on Wikisource
- English translation by Shawn P. Wilbur

== Bibliography ==
- Baylac, Marie-Hélène (2024), Louise Michel (in French), Paris: Perrin, ISBN 978-2262097714
- Bouhey, Vivien (2009), Les Anarchistes contre la République [The Anarchists against the Republic] (in French), Rennes: Presses universitaires de Rennes (PUR)
- Piarotas, Mireille (2000). Regards populaires sur la violence [Popular looks at violence] (in French). Saint Etienne (France): Presses Universitaires de Saint-Etienne (PUSE). ISBN 978-2862721804.
- Tardif, Marie-Pier (2021), Ni ménagères, ni courtisanes. Les femmes de lettres dans la presse anarchiste française (1885-1905) (PhD thesis) [Neither housewives nor courtesans. Women writers in the French anarchist press (1885-1905)] (PDF) (in French)
- Verhaeghe, Sidonie (2019), "Une pensée politique de la Commune : Louise Michel à travers ses Conférences" [A political thought of the Commune : Louise Michel through her Conferences], Actuel Marx (in French), 66 (2): 81–98, doi:10.3917/amx.066.0081
