= Ère des attentats =

1892–1894 anarchist terrorist campaign

- Part of propaganda of the deed anarchist activities
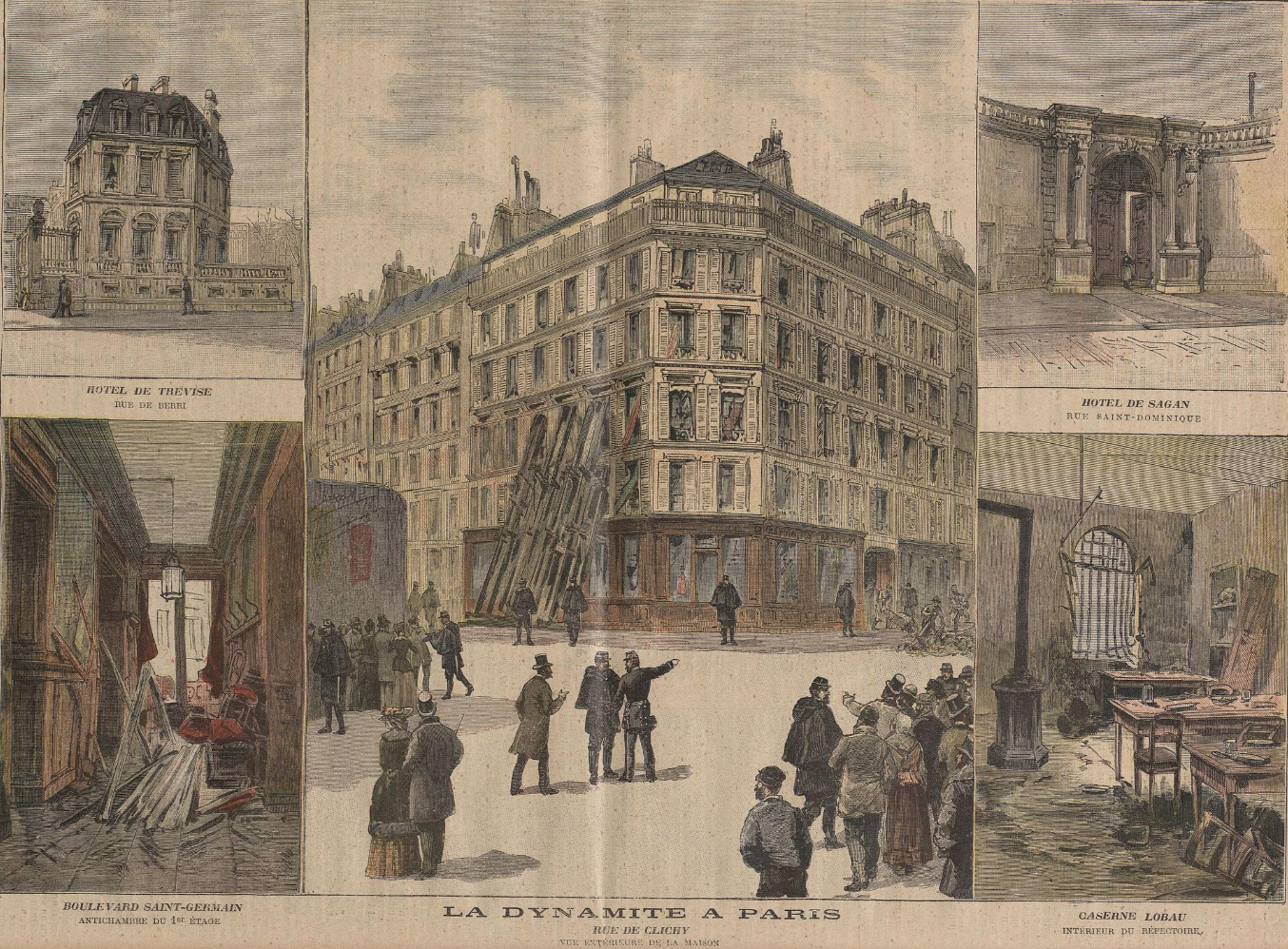
- Double page 'The dynamite in Paris' in Le Petit Journal (16 April 1892) showing the first attacks of the Ère des attentats. At the center is the Clichy bombing, while on the sides are the Saint-Germain and Lobau bombings.
- Date: 11 March 1892; 1892 – 1894
- Location: France
- Methods: Summary executions, legal repression, massacres, terrorism, propaganda of the deed
- Result: Inconclusive. Increase of the repression against anarchists but birth and spread of modern terrorism.

Parties
France	Anarchists

Lead figures
Sadi Carnot †; Émile Loubet; David Raynal; Marie-François Goron; Gustave Bisson †	Ravachol †; Émile Henry †; Gustave Mathieu; Léon Léauthier †; Auguste Vaillant †; Sante Geronimo Caserio †; Adrienne Chailliey; Clotilde Mabillon

Casualties and losses
12 deaths, 55–65 injured	Unknown

The Ère des attentats (French for 'Era of Attacks'), or the French anarchist campaign of attacks from 1892 to 1894, was a period in the history of France and the broader history of propaganda of the deed, marked by a significant wave of political violence, both from the French authorities and anarchist terrorists. Its chronological boundaries extend from the Saint-Germain bombing (11 March 1892) to the massacre of the anarchist convicts (22 October 1894). During this period, the French press largely shaped political discourse and public opinion, presenting these acts as interconnected events forming a progressive logic rather than isolated incidents.

In response to the significant repression anarchists had suffered in France since the Paris Commune (1871), a number of them came to consider terrorism as a legitimate means of avenging this repression, targeting symbols of power, state institutions, and emblematic places of bourgeois life. During the first part of the period, Ravachol, Théodule Meunier, and other anarchist activists engaged in a series of bombings targeting those responsible for judicial persecution against anarchists—consequently, Ravachol was tried and sentenced to death, becoming a martyr for the anarchist cause.

In response to these developments, the French state engaged in increasingly harsh repressive policies, which generally proved ineffective and only further radicalised anarchists in France. After the National Assembly bombing (9 December 1893), a major crackdown began, leading to the passing of the first two lois scélérates and the start of widespread repression of January and February 1894. This wave of repression triggered a new series of attacks and, in February 1894, Émile Henry carried out the Café Terminus bombing, one of the first acts of indiscriminate terrorism and a significant event in the emergence of modern terrorism. A few months later, Sante Caserio committed the last attack of the period by assassinating one of the main figures behind the repressive policies, the president of the Republic, Sadi Carnot, whom he stabbed to death in Lyon. The period ended in October 1894, when the French authorities organised the massacre of a part the anarchist convicts deported to the French Guiana penal colony.

The Ère des attentats had broader ramifications. It influenced anarchists in France, who began turning toward new forms of organisation such as anarcho-syndicalism. It also led France to establish stronger and increasingly coordinated repressive methods in cooperation with other European powers. The era significantly impacted the arts, especially French literature, inspiring the creation of new literary figures such as Fantômas. Lastly, it influenced the emergence and integration of terrorism into the modern world.

== General aspects ==
=== Historiography and chronology ===
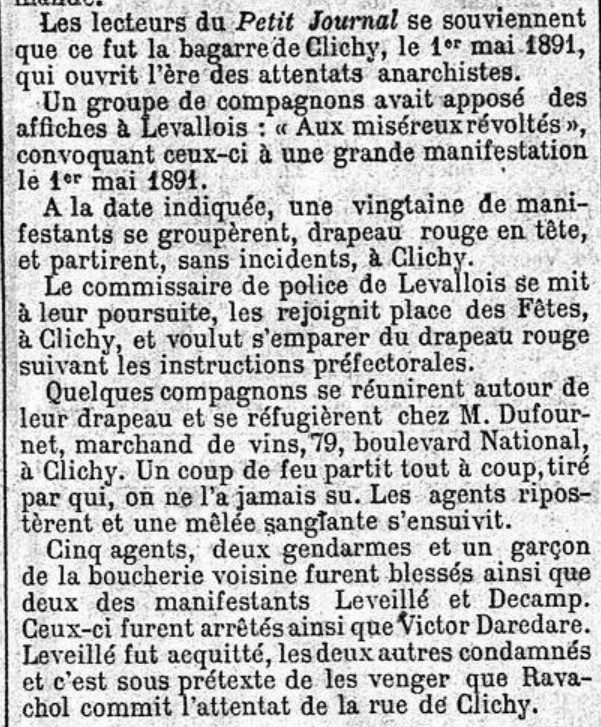
Le Petit Journal's characterization of the 'Ère des attentats' as a result from the Clichy affair (29 August 1894)

Jean Maitron's 1951 history of the French anarchist movement established the term Ère des attentats for the French period of propaganda of the deed anarchist attentats from 1892 to 1894. The French press was also influential in this specific view, as it shaped the narrative by writing recurring features—for example, titled 'The Dynamite' or 'The Anarchists'—which structured the public perception of anarchist terrorism in France during that period. It did not present the attacks as isolated incidents, but rather as parts of a single, unified 'Ère des attentats' that followed its own internal logic. By anticipating and portraying the attacks as interconnected and inevitable, the press participated from 1892 in the construction of a discourse likely to justify security or repressive measures targeting anarchists but also promoted a specific view of the period within French public opinion.

As this was one of the most active periods of the anarchist broader terrorist acts and perspectives (1880–1914), the term is also used by metonymy in English-speaking scholarship to designate the whole trend of such attacks beyond France.

Establishing an exact timeline for this period is challenging, but Hélène Millot considers that it began with the Saint-Germain bombing in March 1892 and concluded with the massacre of anarchist convicts in October 1894. For Vivien Bouhey, the period in question is broader, spanning from 1890 to 1894, without any clear event-based boundaries.

=== Typology ===
Ère des attentats (Paris)
Location of the Parisian attacks during the period

According to Hélène Millot, the anarchist attacks of this period can be divided into three main categories. The first category, which is the most common, involves attacks targeting symbols of power – the capital, the three branches of government, the military, or the ruling class. The second category consists of acts of revenge, and the third concerns attacks that fit within the logic of indiscriminate terrorism.

The idea that the attacks characterising this period were mostly individual acts is criticized by Bouhey, who notes that, on the contrary, many attacks were organised by small groups rather than completely isolated militants.

=== Nuances ===
According to John M. Merriman, when analysing anarchist terrorism overall, one must not forget that this represents only a minimal part of the terrorism of the era. Thus, state terrorism—which predates the emergence of revolutionary terrorism—resulted in far more victims than anarchist terrorism. During the 1890s, anarchists killed, worldwide, at most 60 people and injured 200. In contrast, the Semaine sanglante is only a single example of state terrorism. It caused 15,000 deaths—approximately 260 times more victims than anarchist terrorism in one week.

== Context ==
=== Birth and development of anarchism ===
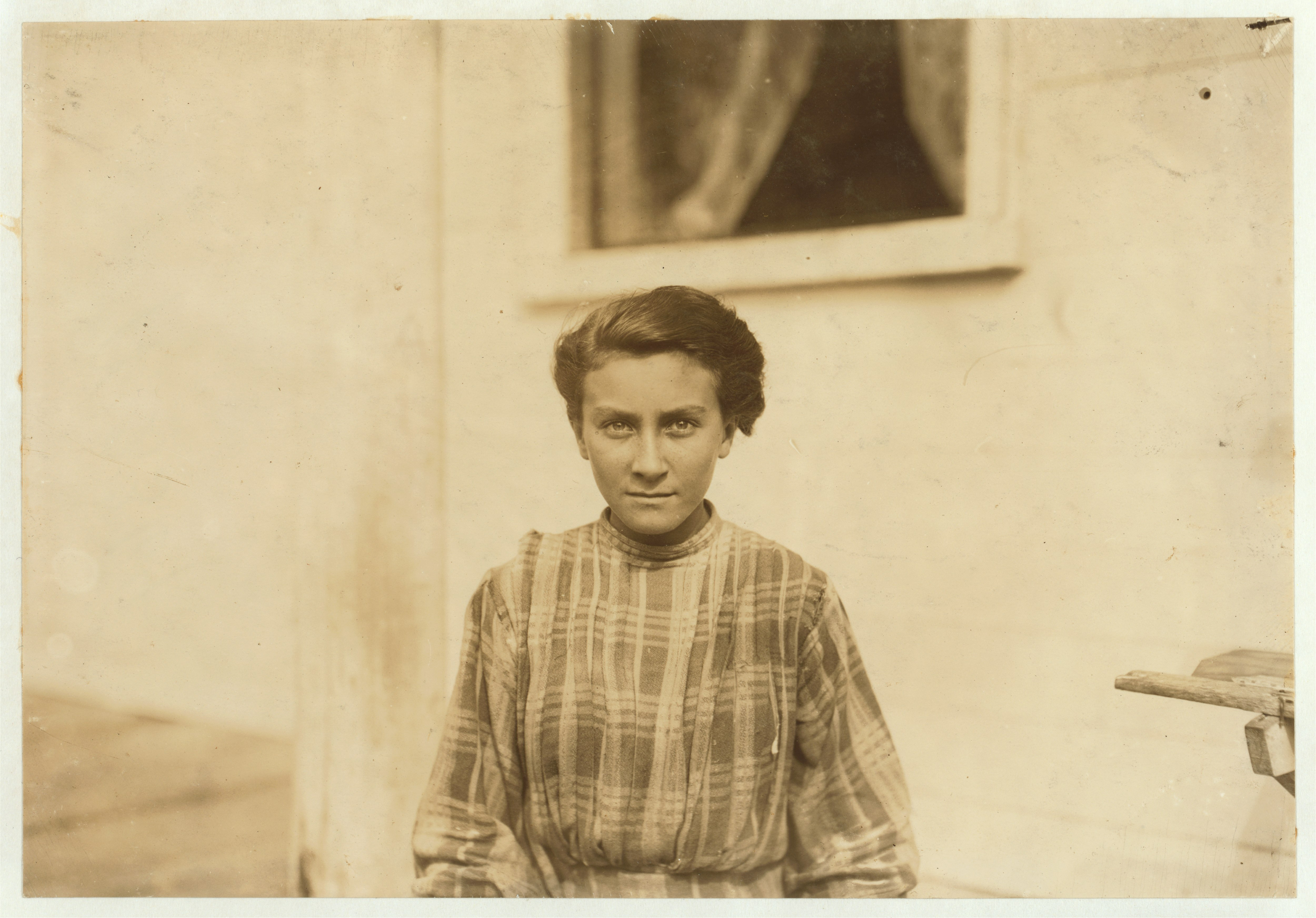
Child French textile worker (13 years old) - France, 1911

In the 19th century, the anarchist movement took shape. It emerged under the same conditions that saw the birth of socialism and Marxism—namely, the industrial revolution in Western Europe and the United States, which led to a massive rural exodus to urban centers. The development of heavy industry, urbanization, and, more broadly, capitalism brought about significant changes in Western societies, which later extended to the entire world.

Within this context, a number of thinkers and revolutionaries, including Joseph Proudhon (1809–1865), Mikhail Bakunin (1814–1876), and Peter Kropotkin (1842–1921), defined an ideological framework. While their ideologies varied and their versions of anarchism did not necessarily align on all points, they shared a commitment to abolishing all forms of domination perceived as unjust. This included economic, political, religious, domestic, and other forms of oppression, depending on the texts.

The state was a primary target of anarchist thought, as it was seen as the entity that supported and exercised many of these dominations through its police, army, and propaganda. The Third Republic, established after the defeat of the Paris Commune, turned away from addressing social issues, which allowed the anarchist movement to grow and take deeper root in France.

=== State repression, evolutions and the 'coming vengeance' ===
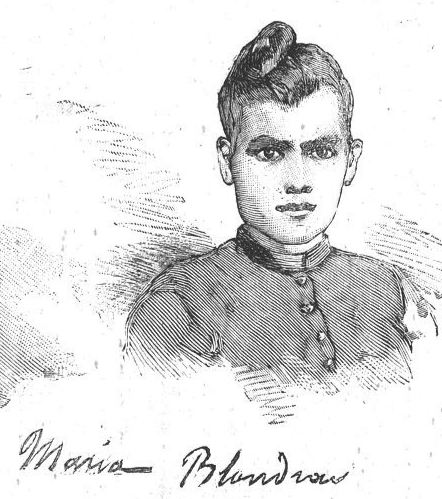
Posthumous portrait of Maria Blondeau, detail from an illustration of the Fourmies shooting victims during the 1 May 1891 demonstration (L'Intransigeant Illustré)

The anarchist social environment was in a precarious situation in the early 1890s. It was subjected to significant state repression in the 1870s and especially the 1880s, with increased surveillance of anarchists, harsher sentences, the banning of their press, and numerous trials targeting them and, more broadly, far-left movements. In France specifically, this led to significant transformations within anarchist circles, which became increasingly radicalized in response to this repression and adopted new organizational methods. While anarchists had previously gathered in relatively large groups, the movement became more insular in order to evade the police, leading to the disappearance of such groups. They were replaced by sometimes nameless groups composed of only a few militants. Meeting places, which had previously been in halls rented by activists, changed to more private spaces, such as homes. These developments made state surveillance of anarchists more complicated and, more generally, allowed for the emergence of the phenomenon of the lone wolf within anarchist and terrorist actions. Police were caught off guard by these changes and struggled to track all the new groups, organisations, and informal gatherings that continued to emerge as repression intensified.

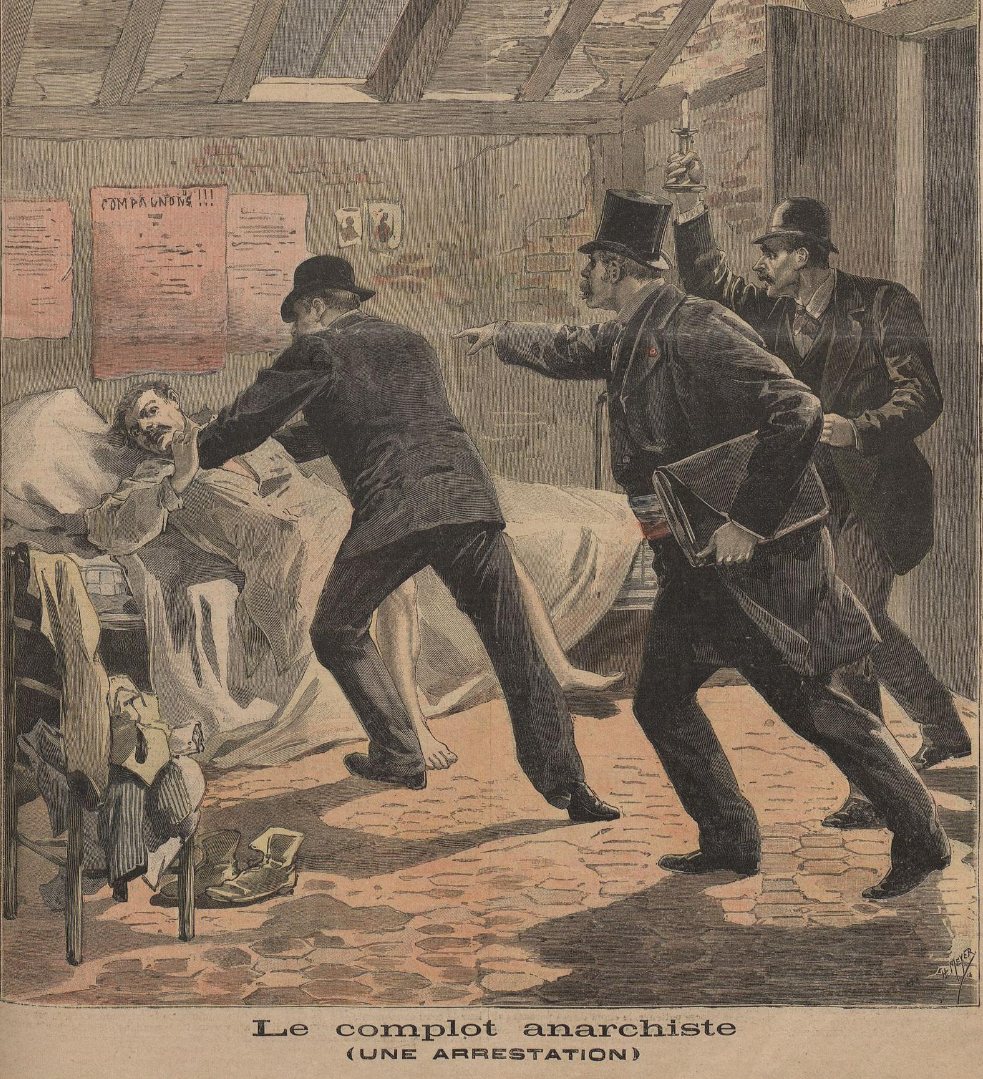
Representation of an anarchist arrest during the Ère des attentats, Le Petit Journal (3 June 1893) with the caption 'The anarchist plot: an arrest'

In addition to these internal developments within the anarchist movement in France, neighbouring states often acted similarly toward the anarchists within their borders, which led anarchist militants in Europe to develop significant mobility. The exile or flight of a large number of them thus contributed to the rapid spread and evolution of their ideas across Europe.

Moreover, the repression triggered a series of traumatic reactions within anarchist circles and among anarchist actors, who were gradually isolated from other leftist movements, such as the socialists. In this repressive context, a certain number of anarchists came to believe that vengeance against the bourgeoisie, magistrates, police officers, or any other target perceived as responsible for this violence was legitimate.

This tension erupted on 1 May 1891, during International Workers' Day, in two pivotal events. The first took place in the town of Fourmies, where textile workers' wages had dropped by 20% over a few years, leading to discussions about launching a strike. A group of a few hundred people, led by Maria Blondeau, gathered in front of Fourmies' church, where they encountered the army. After clashes between the groups, the commanding officer gave the order to fire on the crowd, only stopping when priests intervened. Ten people were killed by the army, including a child.

That same day, a small group of anarchists marched toward Clichy. On their way, they encountered four policemen, leading to a confrontation. Some of the anarchists entered a nearby bar to buy drinks. Shortly after, the police stormed the bar to seize what they considered a "seditious symbol"—a red flag carried by the group. Gunfire was exchanged. Three members of the group, Henri Decamps, Charles Dardare, and Louis Léveillé, refused to surrender and were struck with sabers. They were then taken to the Clichy police station, where they were pistol-whipped and kicked before being left without medical treatment or water. In August, during their trial, the prosecutor sought the death penalty for all three. Two of them received harsh sentences—five and three years in prison.

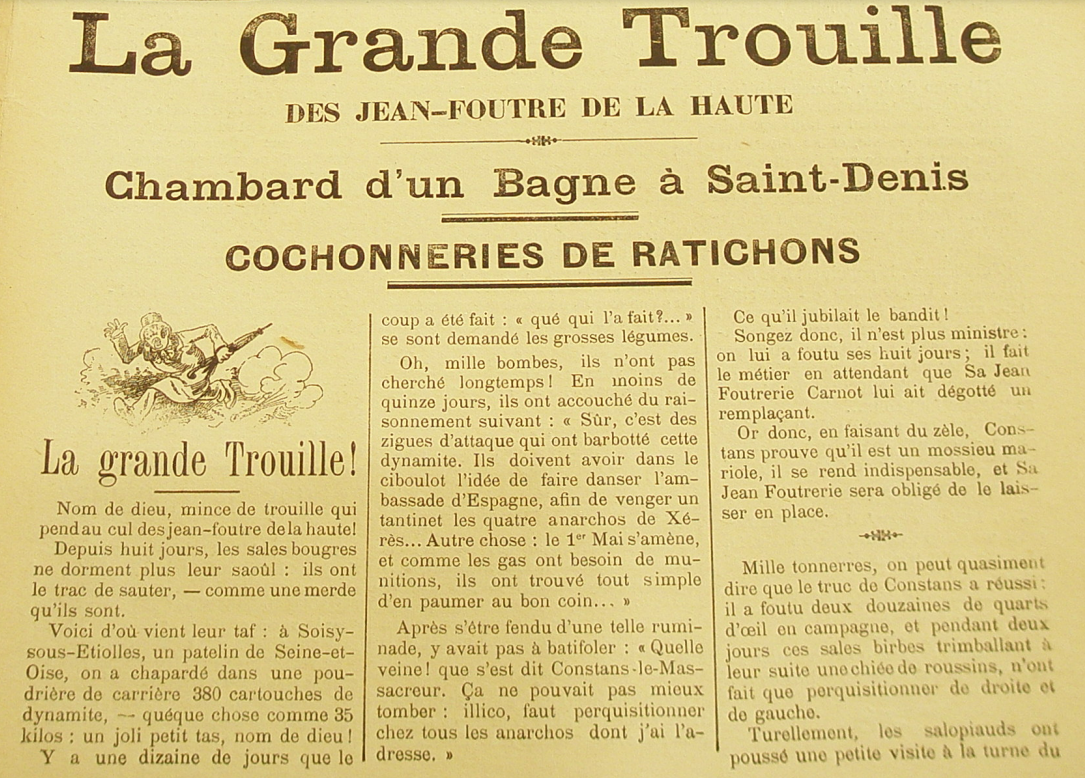
"The big fear of the wankers of the upper class", front page of Le Père Peinard, discussing the robbery of 35 kg (77 lb) of dynamite by Ravachol, Soubère, Jas-Béala and Charles Simon

These two events further radicalised anarchists in France. A group in the 15th arrondissement of Paris began calling themselves "Vengeance for Fourmies". In December 1891, the first anarchist attack was thwarted when three bombs were discovered at the Clichy police station. Jean Grave, himself a witness to the period, described the shock caused by the Clichy affair among anarchists, writing:

Arrests and convictions followed their course, only increasing the exasperation of the anarchists. The unjust condemnation of the Clichy demonstrators, in particular, had brought this exasperation to its peak. It was the straw that broke the camel’s back. Several comrades, out of solidarity, resolved to avenge their companions.

== Events ==
=== March–July 1892: Ravachol and Meunier ===
==== First attacks ====
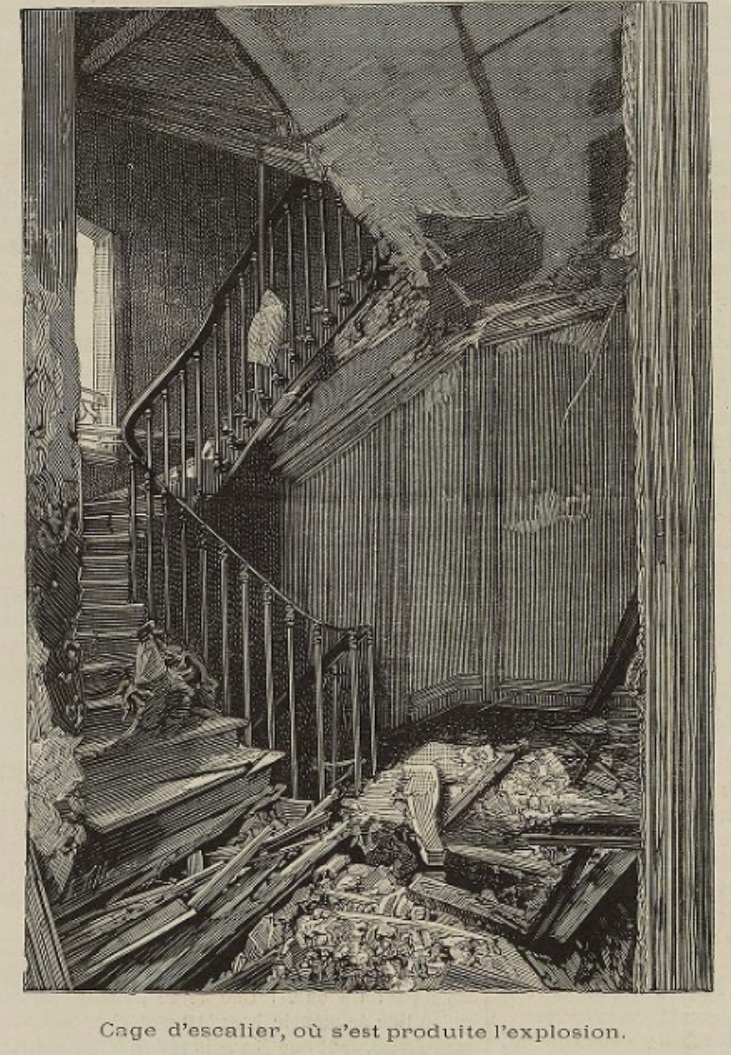
Representation of the aftermath of the Saint Germain bombing in L'Illustration (19 March 1892)

On 29 February 1892, a bombing targeted an elite residence on Rue Saint-Dominique, causing neither casualties nor significant damage.

Above all, in response to the Clichy affair, a small group of anarchists—including François Ravachol, Rosalie Soubère, Joseph Jas-Béala, and Charles Simon—decided to take action and assassinate the judge responsible for the judicial persecution of the defendants, Edmond Benoît. During the night of 14–15 February 1892, Ravachol and the other anarchists managed to steal 30 kilograms of dynamite from the Soisy-sur-Seine quarry, allowing them to use this arsenal to prepare attacks.

In the following days, Ravachol and Simon built the bomb, and then the group of four took the tramway to carry out the Saint Germain bombing on 11 March 1892. Soubère sat between Simon and Béala and carried the bomb, hiding it under her skirts. She then handed it to Ravachol, who, armed with two loaded pistols, entered the building, placed the bomb on the second floor in the centre of the building—since he did not know exactly where Benoît lived. He lit the fuse and fled, while Soubère and Béala stood watch outside. She remained on-site to observe the aftermath of the explosion as her companions left the area. There was one injured and no fatalities.

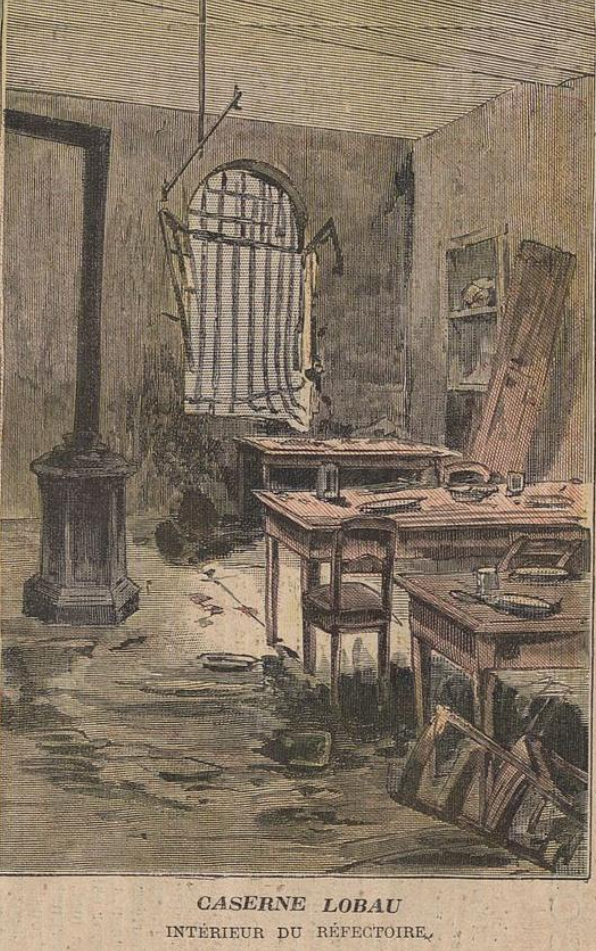
Representation of the Lobau bombing aftermath (dining room of the barracks) in Le Petit Journal (16 April 1892)

Although these first two attacks were strategic failures, they symbolically marked the beginning of this period and thrusted France into this new era. Moreover, the Saint-Germain bombing – like most of the subsequent attacks of the Ère des attentats and many acts of modern terrorism – marked a shift in terrorist tactics. From then on, terrorism no longer merely targeted individuals for their symbolic significance but also attacked places for their symbolic value. Spaces thus became targets in their own right.

Four days after the Saint-Germain bombing, on 15 March 1892, an anarchist militant from the Pieds Plats group, Théodule Meunier, continued the series by carrying out the Lobau bombing, targeting a symbolic site of the repression of the Paris Commune and the French state. He went to the Lobau barracks on rue de Rivoli and placed a bomb in front of the building, which housed 800 Republican guards at the time. The bomb exploded, 'blowing away' the gate, part of the perimeter wall of the barracks, and shattering the windows of the adjacent Saint-Gervais church. However, it caused no deaths and injured no one. Meunier managed to escape.

Dissatisfied with the outcome of his first attack, Ravachol decided to attempt a new bombing alone—this time targeting the prosecutor in the Clichy case, Léon Bulot. After preparing the explosive, he went to his target's residence on 27 March 1892, planted the bomb, and fled, waiting for it to detonate. The Clichy bombing killed no one but caused significant material damage.

==== Arrest, Véry bombing, trial of Ravachol ====
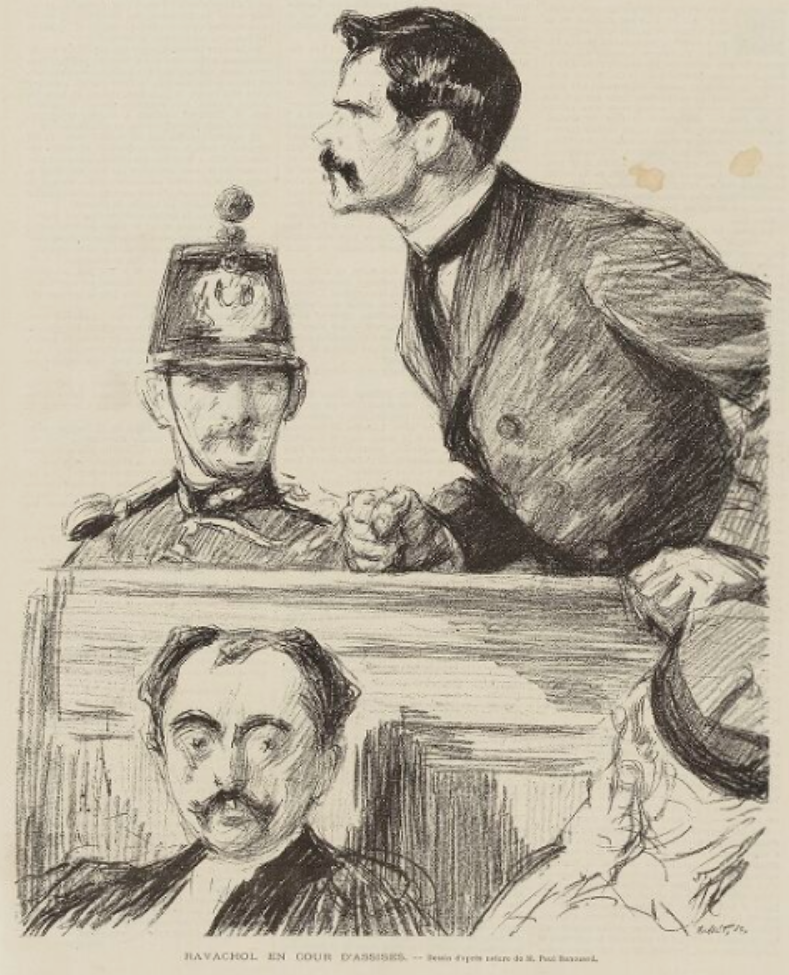
Ravachol defending himself during his trial, L'Illustration (30 April 1892)

Ravachol was arrested three days later at the restaurant Le Véry, reported to the police by its namesake owner and an employee, Lhérot. This betrayal deeply angered anarchists, who viewed the owner, Véry, and the employee as the worst kind of traitors. Meunier, still at large, then joined forces with several comrades from the Pieds-Plats group—including Jean-Pierre François and Fernand Bricout—and resolved to assassinate Véry as retribution for informing on Ravachol. The Véry bombing became the first deadly attack of the Ère des attentats, killing two people and wounding at least one.

Ravachol and his accomplices were put on trial by the French state. Ravachol claimed full responsibility for his bombings in an attempt to save his comrades. The French authorities were conflicted with this trial, as they had to balance the appearance of a fair process with preventing Ravachol from using it as a platform to promote anarchism. The royalist press utilised the affair to mock the Republicans, pointing out that those who had once supported revolution and insurrection were now being outflanked on their left by the anarchists. Access to the trial was restricted, and the jury was carefully selected to ensure proceedings favoured the government. Due to its highly political nature, the case foreshadowed the Dreyfus affair.

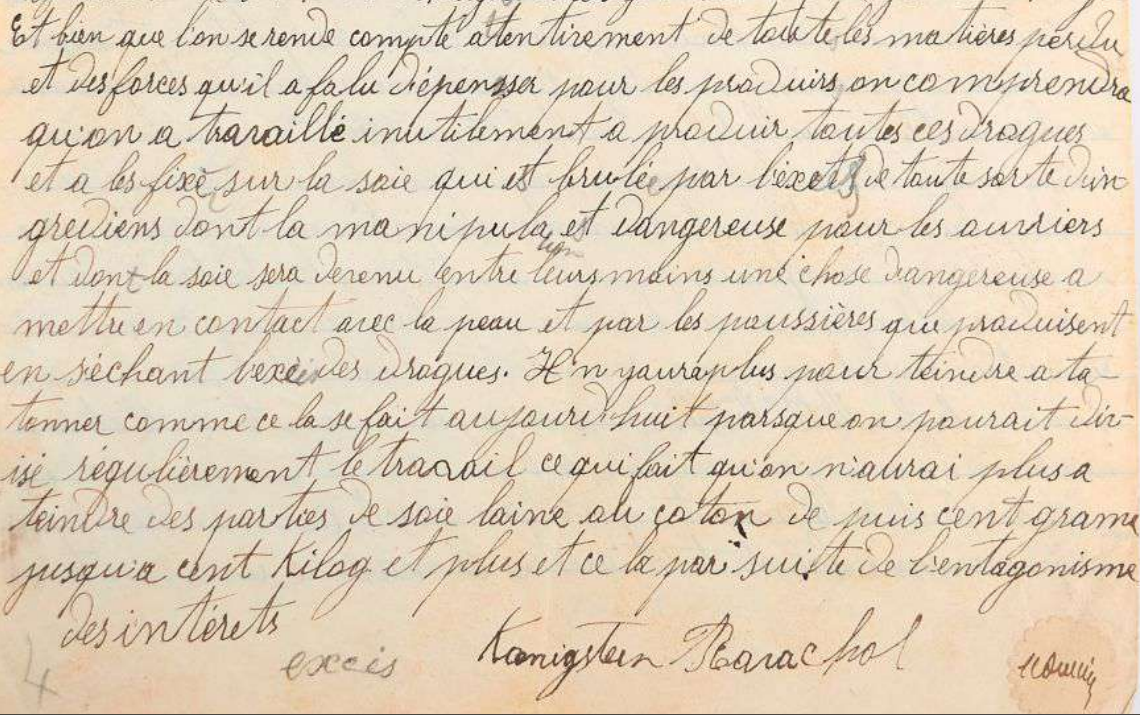
Last part of Ravachol's Forbidden Defence Speech original manuscript, discussing silk trade and anarchy, 21? June 1892 (manuscript available on French Wikisource)

Despite these measures, the state was outmanoeuvered by Ravachol's defense, led by Louis Lagasse. Lagasse succeeded in widely publicising anarchist ideals and subverting the usual course of terrorist trials—where the accused was dehumanised and the restoration of order is the central narrative. One striking example of this was the rumor that Pierre Martinet, an imprisoned individualist anarchist theorist, had been invited by Ravachol to testify and explain the motives behind his actions. Ravachol was convicted alongside Simon, though with mitigating circumstances, while Soubère and Jas-Béala were acquitted. Initially sentenced to hard labour, Ravachol was instead put on trial a second time—this time for common-law crimes.

During this second trial, he attempted to deliver a speech in defense of anarchism (preserved as Ravachol's Forbidden Speech), but the judge denied him the right to say it. He was ultimately sentenced to death. After his condemnation, Ravachol declared:

May my innocent victims understand and forgive me. [...] Long live anarchy!

==== Execution of Ravachol and anarchist radicalization ====
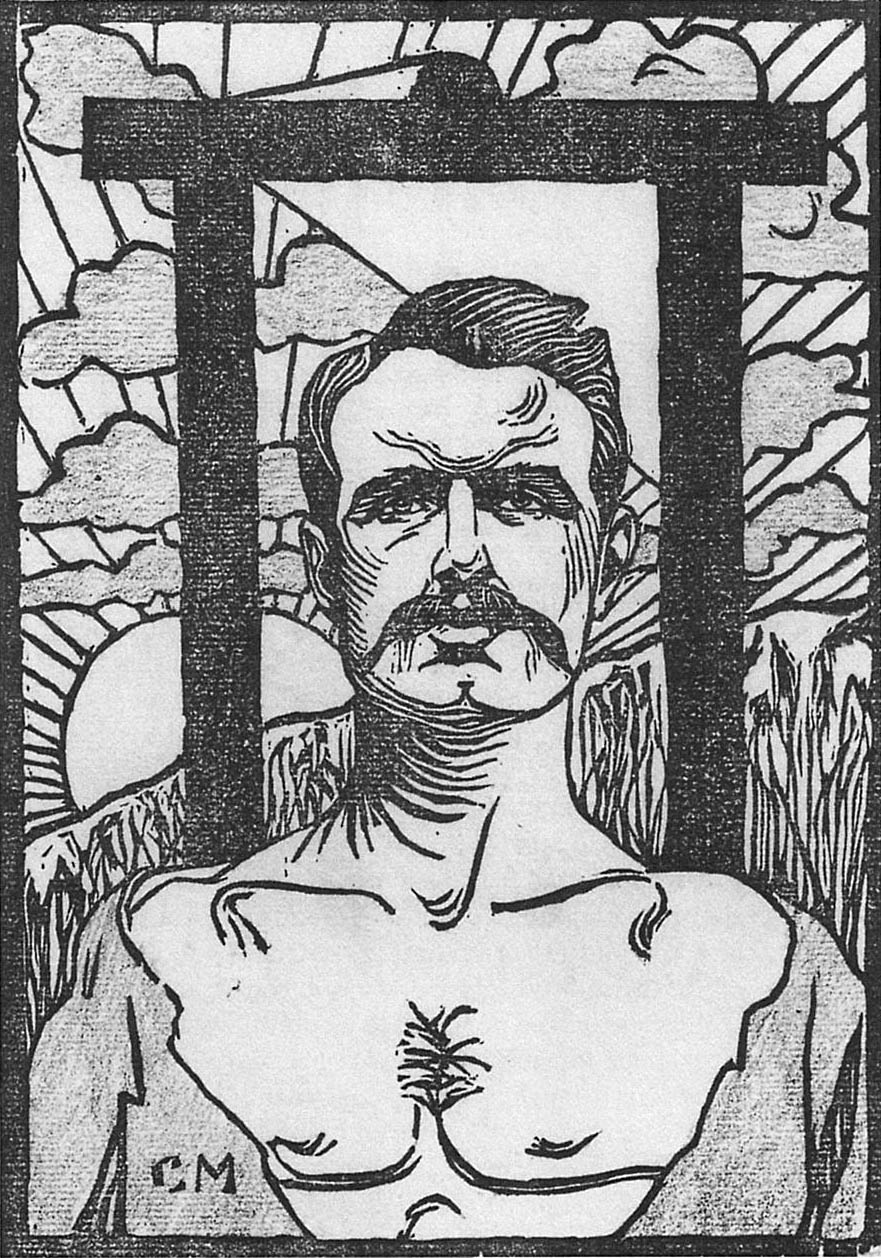
Ravachol, in front of the guillotine, painted by Charles Maurin in 1893

The death sentence of the anarchist triggered a major protest movement among anarchists, who saw it as illegitimate and called for vengeance. Louise Michel, for example, wrote Today or Tomorrow, a text urging anarchists to free Ravachol by force and avenge him. On 11 July 1892 in Montbrison, Ravachol was guillotined—an event that threw French society into new turmoil.

The anarchist press portrayed Ravachol as a martyr; songs were composed in his honor, and he was compared to Jesus Christ—an innocent who had fought for humanity and was killed for it. His execution influenced both anarchists, who became more radical and sought revenge, and wider French society, which cast him as a Robin Hood-like outlaw or even a literary hero—he was one of the inspirations for the character Fantômas.

=== November 1892: Henry and the Carmaux-Bons Enfants bombing ===
Meanwhile, a parallel development occurred as Émile Henry, a young anarchist, became radicalised following Ravachol's execution—despite having initially opposed propaganda of the deed himself.

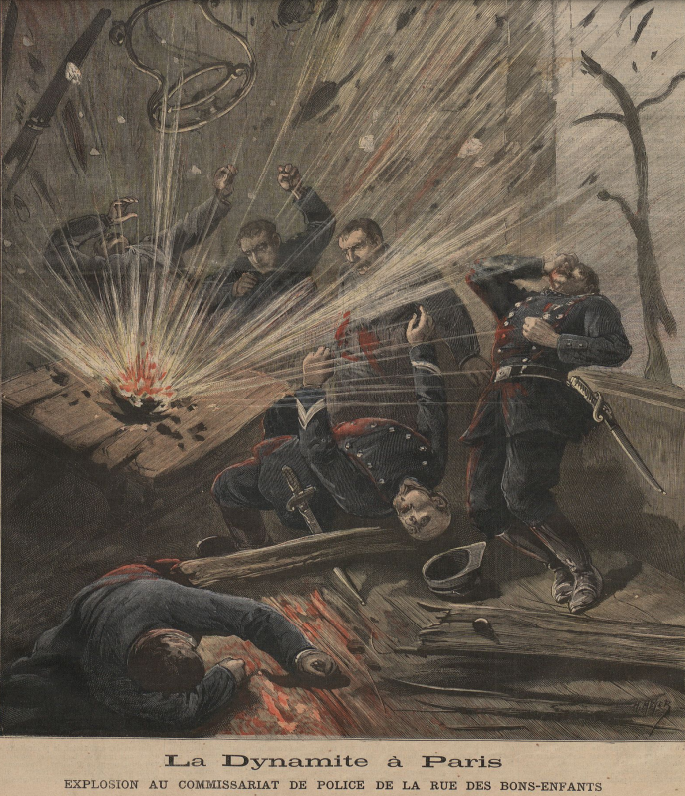
Representation of the Carmaux-Bons Enfants bombing in Le Petit Journal (19 November 1892)

In August 1892, the Carmaux strike began. This strike was triggered by the abrupt dismissal of Jean-Baptiste Calvignac, a socialist and trade unionist working in the Carmaux mine, following his election as mayor of Carmaux. What started as a small, local movement quickly spread and gained national attention, particularly from prominent socialists such as Jean Jaurès. These figures persuaded the workers to negotiate and initially accept a return to work. Henry closely followed the strike and viewed the actions of the socialists and Jaurès as a betrayal that ultimately served only to benefit the bourgeoisie. The fact that the workers resumed work even poorer than when they had left reinforced his belief that they should have directly attacked the means of production, destroyed them, and thereby forced the bourgeoisie to negotiate.

He began manufacturing explosives to target the headquarters of the Carmaux Mining Company, whose address he found in the directory. For this attack, he was likely assisted by his brother and the anarchist activist Adrienne Chailliey, a close associate of Henry who had already given him shelter several times. After assembling the bomb, he took advantage of a moment when his employer sent him on an errand in Paris to place it at the company's headquarters. However, the building's concierge noticed the suspicious package and alerted the police. Officers arrived, retrieved the package, and, accompanied by a company employee, brought it to the police station on Rue des Bons-Enfants. There, the bomb exploded as the officers opened it, killing four policemen and the employee. The Carmaux-Bons Enfants bombing was the deadliest incident of the Ère des attentats.

This attack caused shock both among the police and the anarchists. The police were caught off guard, as they had been preparing for unrest and attacks in Carmaux itself, not suspecting that the target would instead be the company's headquarters in Paris. Anarchists were also surprised by the attack. Kropotkin, Malatesta, and Malato, who were in London at the time, knew nothing about the attacker's identity or the plan, which seemed to be unknown to most anarchist circles. Meanwhile, Henry feigned illness with his employer. In reality, he quickly fled the country, going to the United Kingdom. The anarchist press seized on the event to support it, with Le Père Peinard even noting that the employee was among the victims because the police had refused to move the package themselves, deeming the act 'beneath them'.

=== November 1892-November 1893: a year of lapse ===
This period passed without any notable attacks. Henry was not yet suspected for the bombing, having taken refuge first in the United Kingdom and then in Belgium. From these operational bases, he carried out burglaries in France alongside other illegalist anarchists, such as the Intransigents of London and Paris group and Léon Ortiz. He returned to Paris on several occasions but largely avoided attention during this year, even managing to stay there for up to a month at a time without arrest. However, suspicions against Henry gradually grew.

=== November–December 1893: Spanish influence and resume of attacks ===
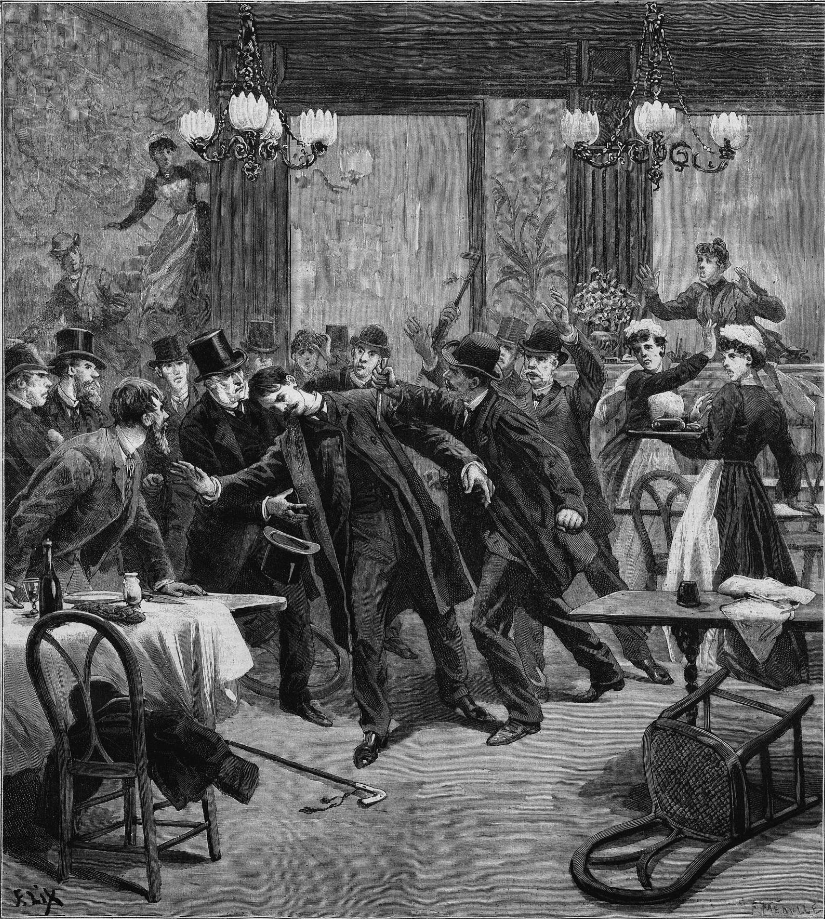
Depiction of the 13 November stabbing in Le Petit Journal (2 December 1893)

Alongside the situation in France, other countries saw similar developments emerge during the same period. In Spain, tensions grew so high that the anarchist campaign of 1893–1897 began with the attempted assassination of Arsenio Martínez Campos by the anarchist militant Paulí Pallàs, who sought revenge for the hanging of four anarchists in Jerez years earlier. After Pallàs was arrested and executed, another anarchist militant, Santiago Salvador, carried out the Liceu bombing on 7 November 1893 to avenge him.

The Liceu bombing marked the dawn of modern terrorism—the first mass-casualty attack, where the target was now an undefined crowd. While the bombing followed its own logic tied to Spain and Catalonia's specific context, it influenced the French Ère des attentats. Just six days after Liceu, Léon Léauthier, a destitute young anarchist, entered a Parisian restaurant, waited for a bourgeois to stand, and stabbed him—targeting the entire bourgeoisie through this stranger. The 13 November 1893 stabbing thus fit the same emerging pattern: the birth of modern, indiscriminate terrorism.

At the same time, Auguste Vaillant—a poor man struggling to provide for his family—gradually embraced anarchism. With financial support from Marguerite Wapler, the wife of Paul Reclus and an illegalist companion, who gave him 120 francs, Vaillant sought to avenge his poverty and Ravachol's execution by targeting the Chamber of Deputies.

A meticulous planner, Vaillant acquired explosives in small quantities from multiple sellers to avoid suspicion. He conducted several reconnaissance missions around the Assembly and ultimately decided to act on 9 December 1893. His bomb was designed to wound rather than kill. That day, he carried it into the public gallery and detonated it during the National Assembly bombing. The explosion caused no fatalities but injured several people, including Vaillant himself.

=== December 1893-February 1894: Lois scélérates and repression ===
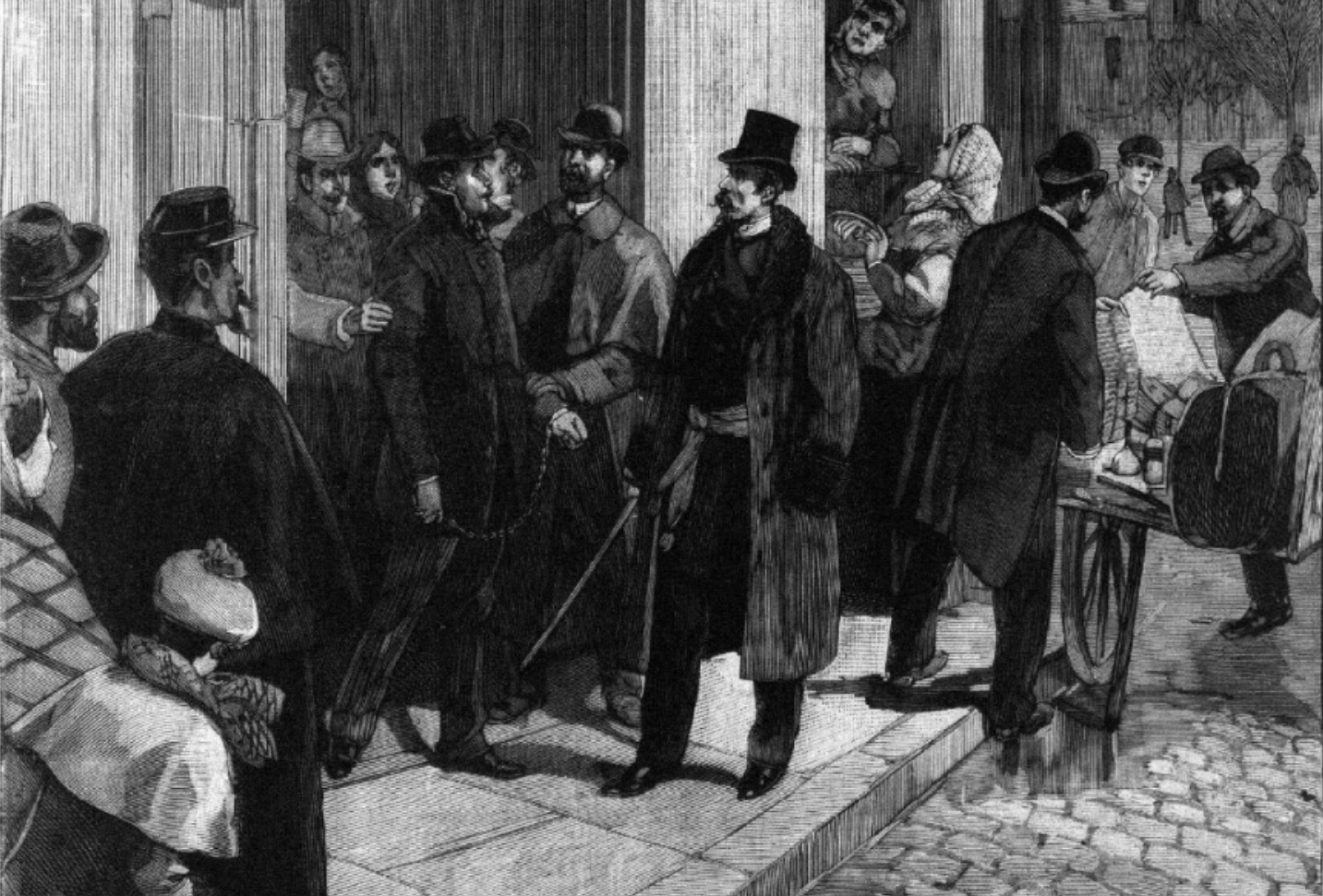
Representation of an anarchist being arrested in Le Petit Parisien: supplément illustré (4 April 1894)

Vaillant was quickly arrested and this attack served as a pretext for French authorities to pass the first two lois scélérates ('villainous laws')—a set of repressive laws later joined by a third in late summer 1894—explicitly targeting the anarchist movement. These laws restricted freedom of speech, weakened the presumption of innocence, facilitated police raids, expanded state surveillance, and normalized preventive arrests. Both the authorities and the French press widely promoted the idea that anarchists were part of a vast international conspiracy, using this narrative to justify their repression.

Cities where raids and arrests were conducted across France in January 1894

Armed with these significant new powers, Interior Minister David Raynal sought to eradicate the anarchist movement. He ordered the compilation of lists containing names of all known anarchist militants and sympathizers, preparing police for a massive operation designed to uncover weapons caches, arrest as many anarchists as possible, and put an end to further attacks. The operation, planned to begin on the night of 31 December 1893 to 1 January 1894 to catch anarchists by surprise, was organized in absolute secrecy. In some cases, authorities even planted false evidence in targeted anarchists' homes to justify their arrest during upcoming raids.

By 6:00 a.m., police launched simultaneous raids across France. Hundreds of militants were targeted—in Paris alone, 50 to 60 raids occurred, with 552 conducted nationwide on that day alone. Some anarchists found their homes surrounded by soldiers with fixed bayonets.

Despite numerous initial arrests, the vast majority of detainees were released due to lack of evidence. Rather than uncovering major weapons stockpiles, police only recovered scattered handguns and one artillery shell. The crackdown primarily affected less radical, well-known anarchists while inadvertently exposing the names of all the people spied upon by the police. This marked the French Republic's most repressive operation since the Paris Commune.

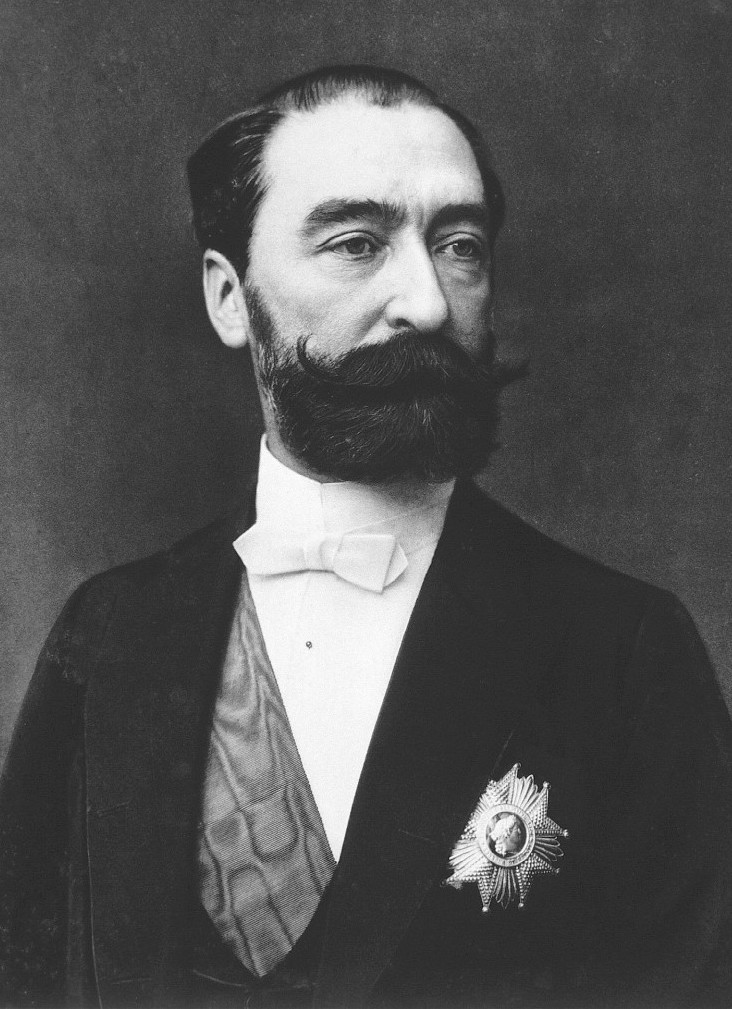
Official portrait of Sadi Carnot (1887)

The trial of Vaillant was rushed through by French justice system, which denied him any recourse and accelerated proceedings to secure a death sentence. His lawyer received the letter informing him of his duty to defend Vaillant just one week before the trial, prompting him to withdraw. Fernand Labori, former lawyer of Clément Duval, founder of illegalism, and future defender of Émile Zola in the Dreyfus affair, took over the case.

Though Vaillant maintained he had never intended to kill and only sought to wound, he became the first person condemned to death in 19th century France without having himself killed. The plight of his impoverished family—particularly his daughter, Sidonie Vaillant—moved many Parisians, who petitioned for clemency. Georges Clemenceau and a group of socialist deputies intervened, appealing to president Sadi Carnot for a pardon, but to no avail.

As Interior Minister David Raynal declared that "terror now lies in the anarchists' camp," a socialist militant named Jules-Louis Breton penned a prophetic statement about Carnot—one that would later earn him a two-year prison sentence:

Our vile society places one man’s life in another’s hands. It allows Carnot to choose between being a murderer or a man. Which role will he prefer? We do not know. But if he coldly opts for death, not a single soul in France will pity him should the day come when his wooden frame is shattered by a bomb.

=== February–June 1894: Resurgence of attacks, indiscriminate terrorism, Carnot's assassination ===
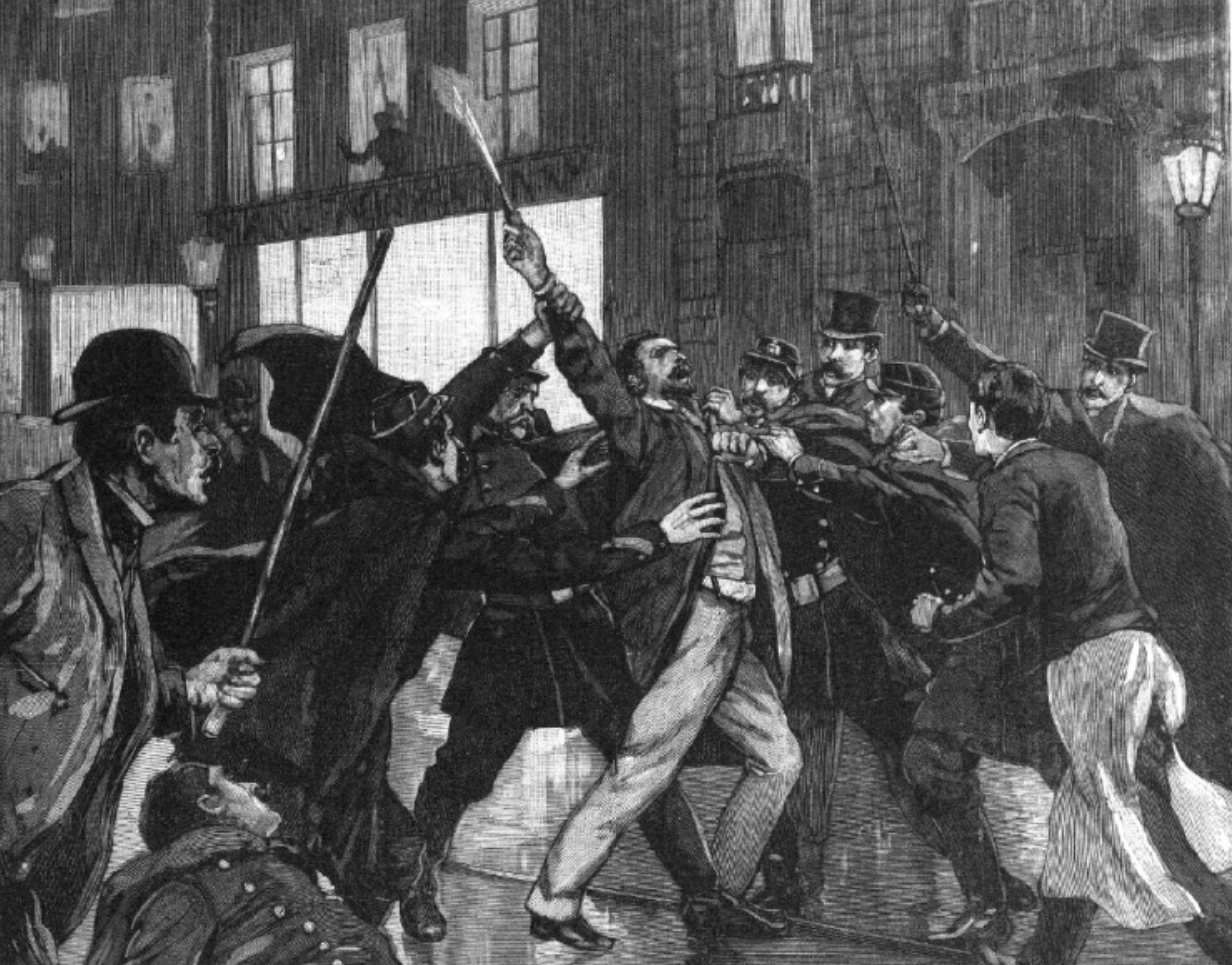
Depiction of Émile Henry's arrest in Le Petit Parisien: supplément illustré (25 February 1894)

In response to the repression of January and February 1894 and Vaillant's execution (6 February 1894), Émile Henry returned to Paris determined to assassinate president Carnot. Finding police presence around the Élysée Palace too heavy, he instead targeted the Café Terminus. After observing a Romani orchestra perform, he lit his bomb's fuse with his cigar and hurled it toward the musicians before fleeing. He was captured shortly afterward.

The Café Terminus attack and Henry's trial proved pivotal in the emergence of modern terrorism. Like the Liceu bombing and the 13 November stabbing months earlier, Henry now targeted society at large—the public itself became the enemy. While not the first such attack, Henry became the first to openly defend this strategy. Unlike Léauthier (who avoided embracing this new terrorism for fear of execution) and Salvador (whose trial came later), Henry publicly claimed responsibility. During his trial, Henry declared his act as vengeance for anarchist repression. Unlike Ravachol or Vaillant, he presented himself not as a vigilante but as a combatant willing to kill or die fighting. He rejected the court's legitimacy, was sentenced to death, refused appeal, and demanded immediate execution by guillotine.

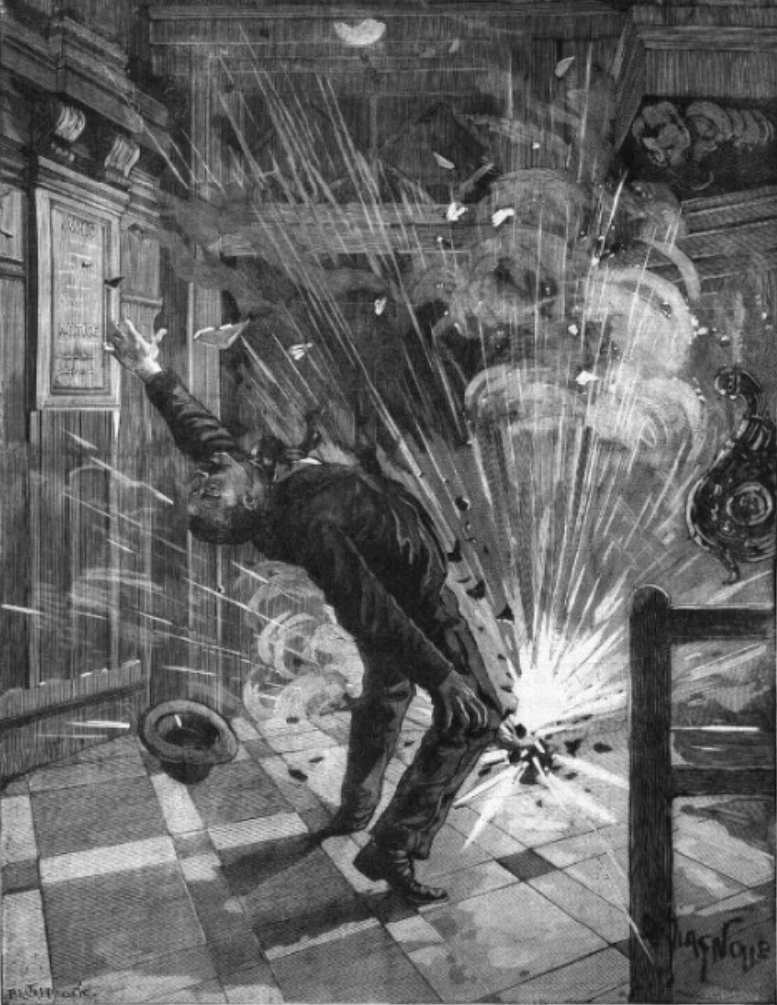
Depiction of the Madeleine bombing in Le Petit Parisien: supplément illustré (25 March 1894)

Henry's attack took both anarchists and French society as a whole by surprise. The completely indiscriminate nature of the bombing was particularly shocking. In anarchist circles, such an indiscriminate attack was met with considerable distance. Most anarchists rejected this act, as it did not target a specific figure of power or the bourgeoisie. The Café Terminus bombing, due to its extreme violence and indiscriminate nature, was one of the events signaling the end of the Ère des attentats. In reality, after this attack, anarchist attacks slowed down until they eventually stopped. Anarchists increasingly recognised the weakness of terrorist strategy, as it led to harsher state repression without necessarily gaining popular support—something that became particularly evident with the indiscriminate nature of the Terminus bombing.

Following Henry's arrest, his friend Désiré Pauwels sprang into action. On the evening of 12 February 1894, the same day as the Café Terminus bombing, Pauwels rented a room at the Hôtel des Carmes, posing as a traveller arriving from Barcelona, which he did by speaking Spanish with an employee. He brought luggage that likely contained the explosives he used to assemble the bombs. Eight days later, he rigged two hotel rooms with explosives, called the police officers who had arrested Ravachol to come visit him—claiming to be a poor man on the verge of suicide—and then waited for the bombs to explode. The 20 February bombings did not kill his intended targets but instead took the life of the owner's wife who was sleeping in the next room.

Pauwels then decided to carry out another attack, this time targeting La Madeleine church, a gathering place for the Parisian bourgeoisie. He went there with a bomb, but it exploded as he was entering the building. Severely injured by the Madeleine bombing, he most likely committed suicide with a bullet to the head to avoid being arrested by the police. He became the target of ridicule in the French press. The attack showed the growing shift in police investigations towards forensic science, as his body was so disfigured by the explosion that the nascent forensic police had to take over the case and succeeded in identifying him.

On April 4, 1894, a bomb exploded at the Foyot restaurant, directly across from the French Senate. The device, hidden in a flowerpot placed on a window ledge, injured four anarchists who were seated nearby, including Laurent Tailhade and his partner, Julia Miahle. The police quickly blamed the anarchists without conducting a serious investigation. More recent research suggests the attack may have been an act of state terrorism, possibly carried out either by the French police—aiming to justify the passage of the third loi scélérate then under discussion—or by the Okhrana, the secret police of the Russian Empire seeking to stir unrest in France.

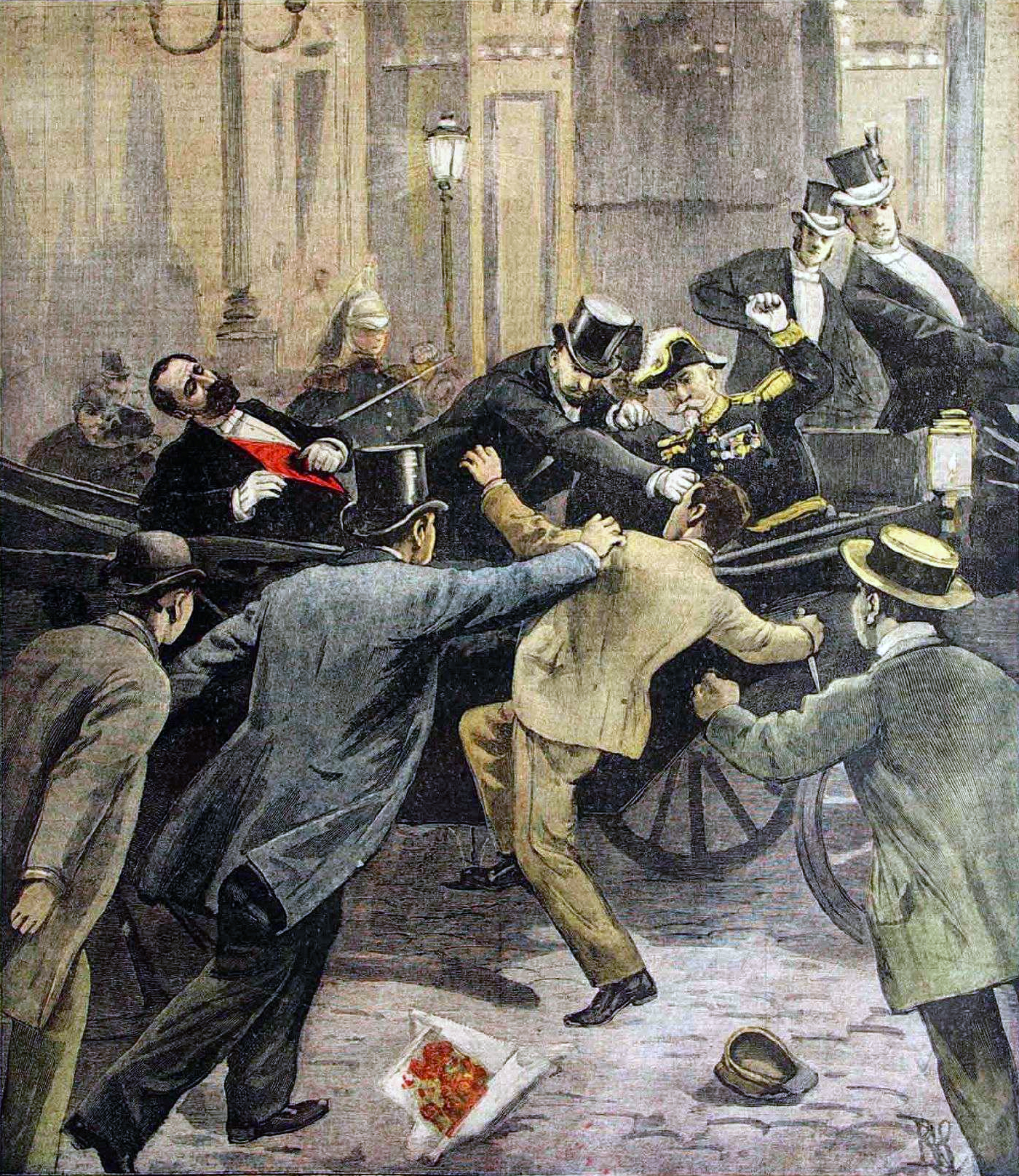
Illustration of French President Sadi Carnot's assassination, Le Petit Journal (2 July 1894)

Two days before Henry's execution, on 19 May 1894, one Célestin Nat walked for some time along the Quai des Augustins, searching for a target—he stabbed a bourgeois under the left ear with a tire-point before fleeing. The victim, Louis Blanc, an olive oil company owner, survived. Nat was later arrested, and upon searching him, the authorities found a notebook containing "La Chanson du Père Duchesne" (the song sung by Ravachol on his way to the guillotine), verses from Auguste Vaillant's tomb, and Émile Henry's manifesto.

Henry was executed on 21 May 1894 under the guard of five hundred policemen. Georges Clemenceau and Maurice Barrès attended, both expressing disapproval of his conviction and execution. Clemenceau began questioning the vicious cycle of 'repression-terrorism', while Barrès complained that Henry had been executed—precisely what he himself had demanded, meaning Henry had obtained what he wanted from the authorities.

On 25 June 1894, in response to the repression of January and February 1894 and his refusal to address Sidonie Vaillant's demands, Sante Caserio—an Italian anarchist who spoke no French—arrived in Lyon with the intent to assassinate Sadi Carnot. Though unfamiliar with the city, he met a few fellow companions and was positioned along Carnot's route at the exact spot where an attack would be possible. As the president passed by, Caserio lunged at him and stabbed him to death before being severely beaten and arrested. This marked the final attack and one of the most significant of the Ère des attentats. Sadi Carnot became the first French president to die in office.

=== August–October 1894: repression, massacre and mutations ===
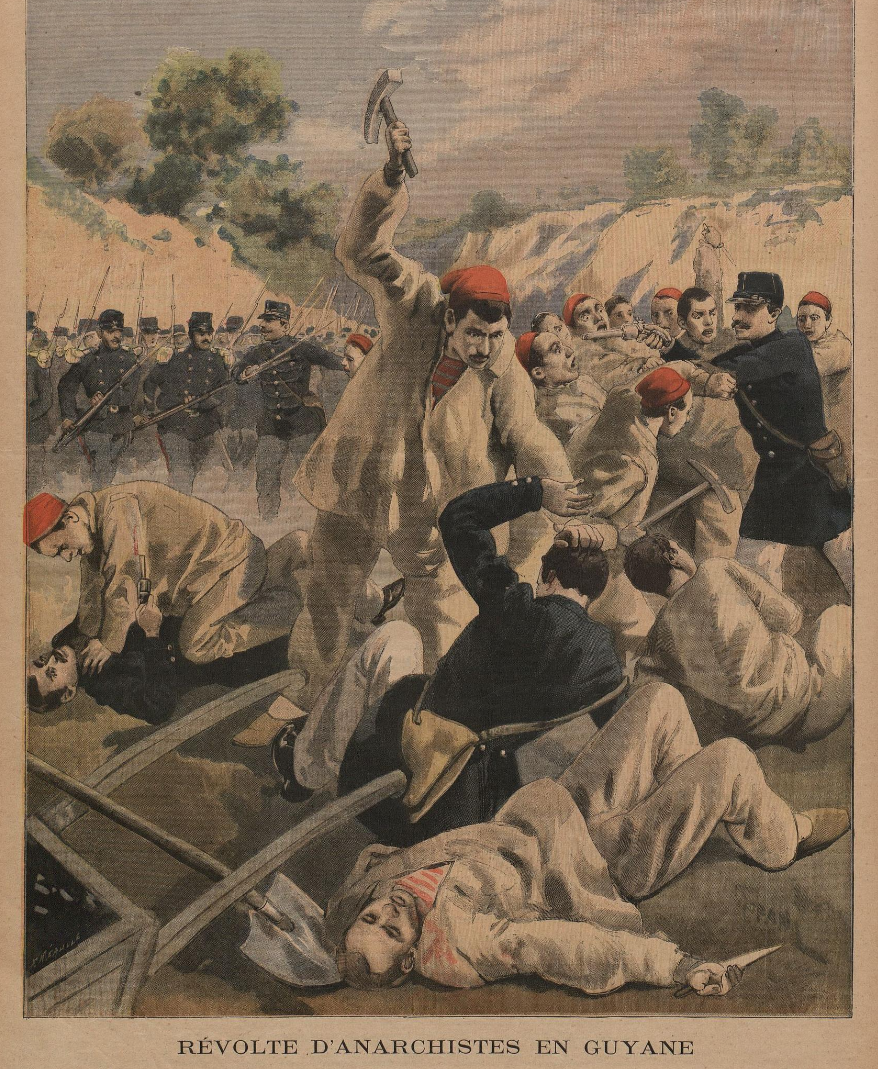
Representation of the revolt of Saint-Joseph in Le Petit Journal (16 December 1894), an image based on the account given by the French authorities

==== Repression ====
The president's death triggered a major crackdown on anarchists. The third loi scélérate was passed, Caserio was sentenced to death, and the following month, around 30 anarchists—ranging from theorists to mere sympathisers—were arrested and put on trial. The Trial of the Thirty, aimed at crushing the anarchist movement, marked a turning point: unlike previous repression campaigns, the French state lost control when the jury acquitted nearly all the defendants, choosing to end the cycle of conflict with anarchists. After 1894, French authorities avoided creating new anarchist martyrs, systematically commuting death sentences to life imprisonment or deportation to penal colonies.

Meanwhile, the presence of anarchists in the penal colony of French Guiana was deeply resented by the colonial and penitentiary administration, which believed that French judges were too lenient with them and that it was necessary to "eradicate this rabble". The authorities devised a plan to eliminate the imprisoned anarchists and sent a convict named Plista to infiltrate them. Not a revolutionary himself, Plista presented an escape plan that some of the anarchists initially supported. The colonial administration was aware of this plan and made preparations to suppress it, using it as a pretext to justify the anarchists' executions. However, the anarchists eventually realised the trap and withdrew from the escape plan before it could begin. Two guards, Mosca and Crétallaz, who had been waiting for an uprising all day with troops ready to intervene, grew impatient. They entered the first barracks they found and shot two convicts. Instead of remaining passive, about 15 anarchists, including Léauthier and Charles Simon (Cookie), decided to resist and attacked the guards. This led to a violent clash and the outbreak of a revolt—the two guards were killed despite being the only ones armed with firearms. The army, already prepared to intervene, stormed the colony and pursued the fugitives the next day in a large-scale manhunt—all were killed summarily the next days.

This event marked the end of the Ère des attentats.

==== Transition to anarcho-syndicalism and general considerations ====
This period brought significant shifts among French anarchists: as time passed, they increasingly sought new forms of organization and struggle to continue their fight from different angles. Many French anarchists exiled in London during this time were struck by the strength of the British labor movement. Upon returning to France, they helped develop anarcho-syndicalism, which gradually replaced the exclusive use of propaganda of the deed—at least in France.

Reflecting on these changes and criticizing this idea of a 'natural' evolution toward anarcho-syndicalism at the end of the Ère des attentats, Uri Eisenzweig highlights a key paradox: the terrorists of this period still employed propaganda of the deed, even though the method had been widely criticized and rethought as early as 1885—long before the wave of attacks began. He thus argues that many protagonists' turn to violence stemmed from socio-cultural motivations rather than a genuine engagement with anarchist theory.

Unlike Eisenzweig, who believes these actors had questionable anarchist motivations because this strategy was supposedly criticized by the anarchist 'elite', the historian Vivien Bouhey, on the contrary, considers that such perspectives towards insurrection, violence, and propaganda by the deed were accepted and supported practices within the movement. Although the anarchist 'elite', such as Émile Pouget and Jean Grave—the former publishing Le Père Peinard and the latter, La Révolte—sought to redirect anarchists' actions towards union activity, among other things, they had to adapt to the militant base, which was largely in favor of propaganda by the deed. In this case, contrary to what Eisenzweig argues, Ravachol and the other propagandists of the deed during this period were not isolated within anarchist groups and thought and did not represent a deviation from the majority opinion in anarchist circles in France. Bouhey writes:

The vast majority of the militant base remained attached [to propaganda by the deed] throughout the years 1881–1894 for several reasons. First, the companions believed, or perhaps wanted to continue to believe, that this strategy—their strategy to end the bourgeois world within the great socialist family—was the only one that could trigger the revolution. Second, at a time when repression was intensifying in the early 1890s, some became radicalized and saw it as the only possible response to state violence. Furthermore, some of them joined the movement at a time when Clément Duval and Ravachol, in particular, were publicizing illegal and violent acts and were, of course, in sync with the strategy. Finally, entering the unions, so often maligned in the past, did not yet appear to be a viable alternative. This is evidenced by the tensions over these strategic questions between a majority of Parisian companions and Jean Grave, as well as the reception given throughout France to the International of London, the events commemorated by the groups, the treatment of attacks by anarchist newspapers, the way they were generally received by the militant base, the calls for revenge at each execution of a propagandist by the deed, and the aura enjoyed by certain propagandists like Ravachol within the groups.

== Legacy ==
=== Influences ===
==== Literature ====
This unique period in France's history marked the peak of interest and fascination with anarchism within French society. Many writers and artists, such as Jean Ajalbert, Francis Vielé-Griffin, Maurice Beaubourg, Paul Claudel, Bernard Lazare, Camille Mauclair, Stuart Merrill, Lucien Muhlfeld, Adolphe Retté, Saint-Pol-Roux, Octave Mirbeau, and Stéphane Mallarmé, were deeply interested with these events. According to Eisenzweig, it represented a convergence between the crisis of language that defined modern literature and the crisis of language underlying the bombings of the era.

He noted that what captivated most of these writers was not anarchism itself but rather the imagery of the bombing—a kind of substitute for language. For instance, Mallarmé was influenced by this period and commented on it, yet he never addressed anarchism directly. All his writings revolved around the image of the bomb or the attentat, without any reference to anarchism. On this subject, he wrote:

[...] When it comes to a terrorist bomb—in 1892-1894, an 'anarchist' bomb—its meaning lies precisely and exclusively in its very opacity. [...] The primary characteristic of this new form of violence is that the act itself is essentially devoid of meaning. [...] Only in this way can the act 'function', so to speak, serving as propaganda by necessitating the emergence of an accompanying discourse. [...] It is precisely here, in the spectacle of this necessary obscurity, that I suggest we find the explanatory principle behind the sudden and seemingly curious sympathy of the gentle Symbolist poets for the anarchists—or rather, for the presumed anarchists who planted bombs in 1892, 1893, and 1894.
'Fascination' is, in fact, a far more fitting term than 'sympathy.' Fascination with a form of speech that is nothing but spectacle, performance—if only it could empty itself of all possible meaning. [...] 'What does the victim matter if the gesture is beautiful?' This quip, apparently made by Laurent Tailhade in reaction to news of Vaillant’s bombing of the Chamber of Deputies during a dinner, seems to me perfectly revealing of what, in this new violence, captivated all those who were, in other respects, more or less enchanted by Mallarmé’s discourse on literature. Anarchism, if you will—but an anarchism associated not so much with 'freedom', 'spontaneity', or marginality as with the idea of an action that would itself be speech—with the dream (or nightmare) of erasing the foundational distinction of modernity between acts and words, between language and event. This suggests that such fascination is directly tied to the major turning point in modern literature, whose timeline and very meaning coincide with the rise of Symbolism—the crisis of the novel at the end of the last century.

==== International police cooperation ====
On the security front, France adopted a policy of 'territorial defense' during this period, meaning it cooperated with other European powers only when it served its interests and thus acted in a largely unilateral manner. Following the first wave of bombings, France expelled a number of foreign anarchists from its territory without notifying neighboring countries—prompting displeasure from British authorities, who pressured the French government to prevent such incidents from recurring. However, by early 1894, France began compiling lists of foreign anarchists on its soil and shared these with Italy and Spain when deporting them.

This crackdown was part of the broader era of propaganda by the deed (1880–1914) and later contributed—through related, though not identical, motivations—to the convening of the International Conference of Rome for the Social Defense Against Anarchists (1898), a precursor to Interpol.

==== Terrorism ====
The Ère des attentats marked an important period for the emergence of modern terrorism. On one hand, it saw the shift toward targeting locations themselves, but it also represented the birth of indiscriminate terrorism. While this strategy did not necessarily persist within anarchist terrorism, it was later adopted by other terrorist groups well into the early 21st century.

== See also ==
- Timeline of the Ère des attentats
- Paris (Zola novel)
- Propaganda of the deed
- Insurrectionary anarchism
- Illegalism
- Anarchist bombing campaign of 1888–1889

== Bibliography ==
- Accoce, Pierre (1998). "« Ils ont eu Sadi Carnot ! »" [They got Sadi Carnot!]. Ces assassins qui ont voulu changer l'Histoire (in French). Paris: Plon. ISBN 978-2259189873.
- Badier, Walter (2010), "Émile Henry, le « Saint-Just de l'Anarchie »" [Émile Henry, the 'Saint-Just of Anarchy'], Parlement[s] (in French), vol. 14, no. 2, Paris: Revue d'histoire politique, pp. 159–171, doi:10.3917/parl.014.0159
- Bantman, Constance (2014), "« Anarchistes de la bombe, anarchistes de l'idée » : les anarchistes français à Londres, 1880-1895" ['Bomb anarchists, idea anarchists': French anarchists in London, 1880-1895], Le Mouvement Social (in French), 246 (1), Paris: 47–61, doi:10.3917/lms.246.0047
- Bouhey, Vivien (2009), Les Anarchistes contre la République [The Anarchists against the Republic] (in French), Rennes: Presses universitaires de Rennes (PUR)
- Bach Jensen, Richard (2015). The Battle against Anarchist Terrorism: An International History, 1878–1934. Cambridge: Cambridge University Press (CUP). ISBN 978-1-107-03405-1.
- Chambost, Anne-Sophie (2017), "« Nous ferons de notre pire… ». Anarchie, illégalisme … et lois scélérates" [«We’ll Do our Worse». Anarchy, Illegalism … and Evil Law], Droit et Cultures (in French), 74 (2): 65–87, doi:10.4000/droitcultures.4264
- Delpech, Jean-Marc (2006), Parcours et réseaux d'un anarchiste : Alexandre Marius Jacob : 1879-1954 (PhD thesis) [The life and networks of an anarchist: Alexandre Marius Jacob: 1879-1954] (PDF), Nancy: Université de Nancy 2, archived (PDF) from the original on 5 April 2025
- Eisenzweig, Uri (1999), "Poétique de l'attentat: anarchisme et littérature fin-de-siècle" [Poetics of the attack : fin de siècle anarchism and literature], Revue d'Histoire littéraire de la France (in French), 99 (3): 439–452, doi:10.3917/rhlf.g1999-99n3.0439, JSTOR 40533862, archived from the original on 17 November 2023
- Eisenzweig, Uri (2001). Fictions de l'anarchisme [Fictions of anarchism] (in French). France: C. Bourgois. ISBN 2-267-01570-6.
- Ferragu, Gilles (2019), "L'écho des bombes : l'invention du terrorisme « à l'aveugle » (1893-1895)" [The echo of bombs: The invention of indiscriminate terrorism (1893–1895)], Ethnologie française (in French), 49 (1): 21–31, doi:10.3917/ethn.191.0021, archived from the original on 4 September 2024
- Frémion, Yves (2011), Léauthier l'anarchiste. De la propagande par le fait à la révolte des bagnards (1893-1894) [Léauthier the anarchist. From propaganda by the deed to the convicts' revolt (1893-1894)] (in French), Paris: L'Échappée, ISBN 9782915830477
- Ferragu, Gilles (2021), "En quête de rupture : de Ravachol à Émile Henry" [In search of rupture: from Ravachol to Émile Henry], Histoire Politique (in French) (45), doi:10.4000/histoirepolitique.2169
- Jourdain, Edouard (2013). L'anarchisme [Anarchism] (in French). Paris: La Découverte. ISBN 978-2-7071-9091-8.
- Kosuch, Carolin (1 January 2019). "The Symbolist Movement: Anarchism and the Avant-Garde in Fin de Siècle France". Anarchism and the avant-garde : a radical arts and politics in perspective. Brill. pp. 13–36. doi:10.1163/9789004410428_003. ISBN 978-90-04-41042-8.
- Lévy, Thierry (2009), Plutôt la mort que l'injustice : Au temps des procès anarchistes [Rather death than injustice: In the days of the anarchist trials] (in French), Odile Jacob, ISBN 9782738118318
- Maitron, Jean (1955), Histoire du mouvement anarchiste en France (1800-1914) (in French), Paris: Histoire du mouvement anarchiste en France, 1880-1914
- Merriman, John M. (2016). The dynamite club: how a bombing in fin-de-siècle Paris ignited the age of modern terror. Yale University Press. ISBN 978-0-300-21792-6.
- Oriol, Philippe (1993). À propos de l'attentat Foyot [à Paris] : quelques questions et quelques tentatives de réponse [About the Foyot bombing [in Paris]: some questions and some attempts at answers] (in French). Paris: Au Fourneau. ISBN 978-2-86288-400-4.
- Piarotas, Mireille (2000). Regards populaires sur la violence [Popular looks at violence] (in French). Saint Etienne (France): Presses Universitaires de Saint-Etienne (PUSE). ISBN 978-2862721804.
- Salomé, Karine (2011), L'Ouragan homicide : L'attentat politique en France au XIXe siècle [The homicidal Hurricane: political assassination in 19th century France] (in French), Paris: Champ Vallon / Epoque, ISBN 978-2-87673-538-5
- Salomé, Karine (2021), "Le 9 décembre 1893, attentat anarchiste à la Chambre des députés" [9 December 1893, an anarchist attentat on the House of Representatives], Parlement[S], Revue d'Histoire Politique (in French), 16 (2), Paris: 145–152, doi:10.3917/parl2.hs16.0145, archived from the original on 25 December 2024
- Tardif, Marie-Pier (2021), Ni ménagères, ni courtisanes. Les femmes de lettres dans la presse anarchiste française (1885-1905) (PhD thesis) [Neither housewives nor courtesans. Women writers in the French anarchist press (1885-1905)] (PDF) (in French), archived (PDF) from the original on 28 October 2022
- Vareilles, Thierry (2005). Histoire d'attentats politiques, de l'an 44 av. Jésus-Christ à nos jours. Éditions L'Harmattan. ISBN 978-2-7475-9685-5.
- Ward, Colin (2004). Anarchism: A Very Short Introduction. Oxford University Press (OUP).
