= Madeleine Rebérioux =

French historian (1920–2005)

Madeleine Rebérioux (8 September 1920, Chambéry, Savoie – 7 February 2005, Paris) was a French historian whose specialty was the French Third Republic. She is also a historian of the Labour movement. From 1981 to 1988, she was vice-president of the Musée d'Orsay in Paris. From 1991 to 1995 she was President of the Ligue des droits de l'homme and had been a signatory to the Manifesto of the 121. She was an officer of the Légion d'honneur. Madeleine was an active board member of Le Mouvement Social and later became its editor. Madeleine was against the war in Vietnam. She was president of French league of human rights - la Ligue des droits de l'homme - from 1991 to 1995.

== Selected works ==
- Jaurès : contre la guerre et la politique coloniale, Éditions Sociales, collection Les classiques du peuple, 1959.
- La Deuxième Internationale et l'Orient, Éditions Cujas, 1967 ISBN 2-254-67715-2.
- Jaurès et la Classe ouvrière, Maspero, 1975.
- La République radicale ? 1898-1914, Nouvelle histoire de la France contemporaine, tome 11, Éditions du Seuil, coll. Points, 1975 ISBN 2-02-000671-5.
- Les Ouvriers du livre et leur Fédération, Temps Actuel, 1981.
- Ils ont pensé les droits de l'homme, EDI-Ligue des droits de l'homme, 1989.
- Jaurès : la parole et l'acte, Gallimard, coll. « Découvertes Gallimard / Histoire », 1994 ISBN 2-07-053291-7.
- Fourmies et les Premier mai, Fourmies Colloquium 1891/1991 (1991), Éditions de l'Atelier, 1994, ISBN 2-7082-3077-8
- Parcours engagés dans la France contemporaine, Belin, 1999.
- Vive la République ! Histoire, droits et combats de 1789 à la guerre d'Algérie, Démopolis, 2009 (recueil d'articles).
