= Paris (Zola novel) =

1898 novel by Émile Zola

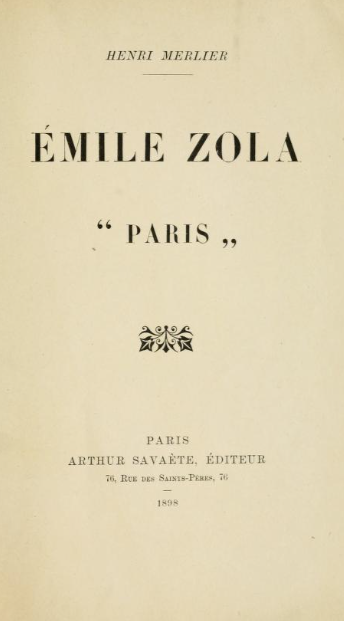
- Title page for Paris (1898)
- Author: Émile Zola
- Publication date: 1898

Paris is a novel by Émile Zola, published from 23 October 1897 to 9 February 1898, during the Dreyfus affair, as a serial novel in the newspaper Le Journal. It is the third part of the novel cycle Les Trois Villes, and its final installment after Lourdes and Rome.

This volume recounts the adventures of the cycle's central character, Abbé Pierre Froment, who returned to Paris after two unsuccessful journeys. The protagonist hopes to find deliverance from his suffering in a capital that had been transformed under the Second Empire and then the Third Republic, and which was also being shaken by social movements. Paris thus concludes the trilogy recounting Abbé Froment's desperate search for a solution to his anxieties and his loss of faith.

This novel can be regarded as an expression of Émile Zola's commitment to raising awareness of the inequalities caused by modernity. It is also a chronicle of political life at the end of the century: the numerous cases of corruption, such as the Panama scandal; and the emergence of the anarchist movement. The author alternates between descriptions of the dominant upper-bourgeois and capitalist society of the 19th century and the social misery of this "fourth estate", of which Zola became one of the fiercest critics. Paris is therefore a social drama.

With this novel, Zola completes the depiction of social conditions that he had begun with Les Rougon-Macquart. In doing so, he also brings to a close the 19th-century tradition according to which the novel was to serve as a mirror of society, as Stendhal famously expressed it in Le Rouge et le Noir:

Un roman est un miroir qui se promène sur une grande route. Tantôt il reflète à vos yeux l'azur des cieux, tantôt la fange des bourbiers de la route.
English translation: A novel is a mirror carried along a high road. Sometimes it reflects the azure blue of the heavens, and sometimes the mud of the road.

— Stendhal, Le Rouge et le Noir, Édition Livre de Poche, première partie, chap. XIX, p. 362

Following Balzac, Stendhal, Sue, Flaubert, and Hugo, Zola makes a deciding contribution to 19th-century realist literature and the Romantic view of Paris.

== Publication ==
Paris was the third and last novel of Zola's Three Cities trilogy. He finished the novel in the Parisian summer of 1897. It was published in serial in Le Journal starting October 23.

== Analysis ==
Critic Edmond Lepelletier wrote that the plot of Paris was a premonition of the coming Dreyfus Affair.

== See also ==
- Ère des attentats
- Interview of Émile Zola by Zo d'Axa for l'Endehors, where Zola claims to be the source of propaganda of the deed with his book, Germinal. (23 March 1892)
