= Célestin Nat =

French anarchist (1870–1895)

- Born: 7 September 1870; Toulouse
- Died: 31 October 1895 (aged 25); Cayenne's Prison
- Occupation: Vagabond, anarchist

Célestin Nat (7 September 1870, in Toulouse – 31 October 1895, in the penal colony of Cayenne) was an individualist anarchist militant and terrorist. Orphaned, he grew up in poverty and vagrancy but eventually managed to secure a job in Marseille at the beginning of the Era of Attacks (1892-1894). However, he was soon dismissed from this job, which led him to visit the chief of staff of the city's mayor, who also refused to provide him with employment.

He then carried out the 1894 Marseille stabbing, two days before the execution of Émile Henry, where he went to the Quai des Augustins in Marseille and stabbed the first bourgeois he encountered. This attack, one of the first to align with the dynamics of indiscriminate terrorism, led to his arrest and trial. He was sentenced to twenty years of imprisonment in a penal colony, where he died the following year.

== Biography ==
Célestin Nat was born in Toulouse on 7 September 1870. He was orphaned, and his parents were unknown; Nat had to spend part of his childhood wandering. He studied for some time in Royat, where he trained in agricultural work. In 1886, he received a silver medal from the Royat farm school upon passing his exam. During this period, he worked in various jobs, particularly as a gardener or as a 'sandwich man'. Nat attended Sébastien Faure's lectures in Marseille when they were held there and frequented the Bar de la Croix de Malte, then a gathering place for radical Marseille anarchists. At the beginning of 1894, he was reported to the police in an anonymous letter as a 'dangerous anarchist', leading to an investigation against him—which yielded no conclusive results.

Nat lost his job at the end of April 1894; he attempted to approach the chief of staff of the mayor of Marseille to request employment, but he was refused and turned away. On 19 May 1894, Nat walked for some time along the Quai des Augustins, searching for a target—he stabbed a bourgeois under the left ear with a tire-point before fleeing. The victim, Louis Blanc, an olive oil company owner, survived. Nat was later arrested, and upon searching him, the authorities found a notebook containing La Chanson du Père Duchesne, sung by Ravachol on his way to the guillotine, verses from Auguste Vaillant’s tomb, and Émile Henry’s manifesto.

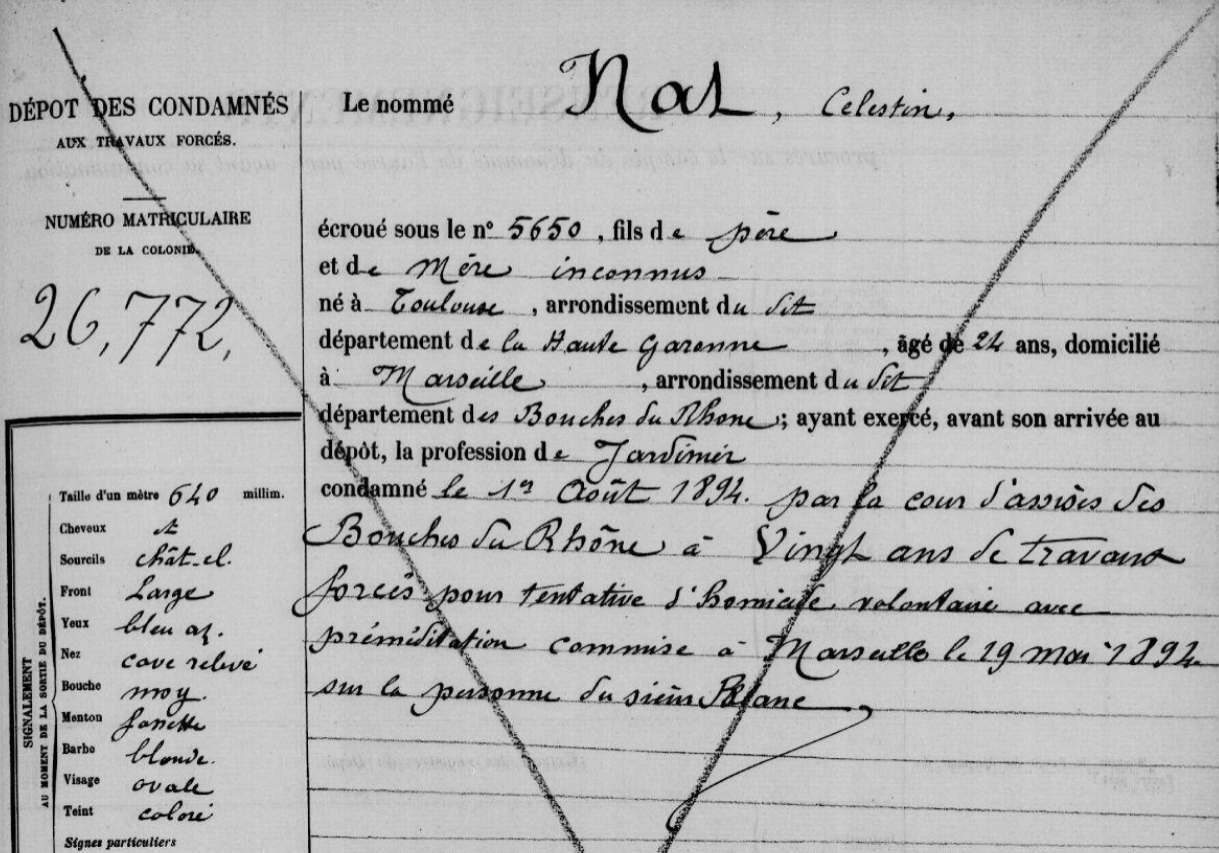
Convict record of Célestin Nat, sentenced to deportation to the bagne (penal colony) in 1894.

This attack took place two days before the scheduled execution of Émile Henry and bore many similarities to the attack carried out by Léon Léauthier on 13 November 1893, a few months earlier. While incarcerated and on the eve of Henry’s execution, he declared to his jailers:

Tomorrow morning, Émile Henry, the martyr, will be guillotined! I have avenged him in advance; perhaps I too will be guillotined, but anarchism will not die because of it. I regret not having been able to kill several bourgeois. [...] I struck this bourgeois as I would have struck any other. I was starving, I was in a state of self-defense: I defended myself.

More broadly, he stated that he had no regrets and that the entire bourgeoisie should disappear. The anarchist was then put on trial in early August 1894, where he completely denied being an anarchist. The prosecutor sought the death penalty, but on 3 August 1894, he was ultimately sentenced to 20 years of imprisonment in the penal colony. He died there on 31 October 1895.

== Bibliography ==
* Bouhey, Vivien (2009), Les Anarchistes contre la République [The Anarchists against the Republic], Rennes: Presses universitaires de Rennes (PUR)
- Delpech, Jean-Marc (2006), Parcours et réseaux d'un anarchiste : Alexandre Marius Jacob : 1879-1954 (PhD thesis) [The life and networks of an anarchist: Alexandre Marius Jacob: 1879-1954] (PDF), Nancy: Université de Nancy 2
