= Murder of the Little Pastry Chef =

1892 murder in France

- Part of Ère des attentats
- Location: Saint-Denis, France
- Date: 22 September 1892
- Attack type: Stabbing
- Weapons: Dagger, rope
- Deaths: 1
- Victim: Gustave Bisson (police informant)
- Perpetrators: Henri Meyrueis, Bernard Chappuliot, David Altéran (unclear and not convicted)
- Motive: Killing an informant responsible for the sentencing of several anarchists
- Accused: 2
- Verdict: Guilty
- Convicted: 2

The murder of the Little Pastry Chef is a French criminal case that began on 22 September 1892 when Gustave Bisson also called Ernest Dubuisson, and mainly known as the 'Little Pastry Chef', an informant for the French police among anarchists in Le Havre and the northern suburbs of Paris, was assassinated in Saint-Denis.

Following the discovery of informant Gustave Bisson's body, strangled and lacerated with several stab wounds, in the Saint-Denis canal, the police initiated searches and proceeded to arrest several anarchists. Henri Meyrueis and Bernard Chappuliot were quickly considered the main perpetrators of the assassination and were sentenced to lifelong deportation to a penal colony.

== History ==
=== Context ===
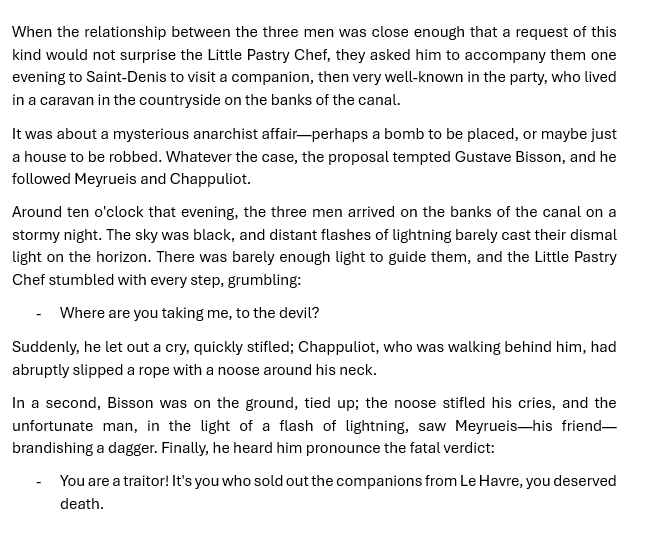
Marie-François Goron's romanced account on the murder of the Little Pastry Chef

In the 19th century, anarchism emerged and took shape in Europe before spreading. Anarchists advocate a struggle against all forms of domination perceived as unjust including economic domination brought forth by capitalism. They are particularly opposed to the State, seen as the organization that legitimizes a good number of these dominations through its police, army and propaganda.

Following the repression of the Paris Commune (1871), anarchists were subjected to increasing government repression. While their initial methods were peaceful and relatively open, this repression pushed them to seek ways to avoid state surveillance and persecution. In this context, a number of anarchists in France came to believe that retaliation against members of the bourgeoisie, magistrates, police officers, or any other target perceived as being responsible for this violence, was a legitimate response.

Within this group of targets that anarchists considered enemies, informants were a particularly high-priority target. They were seen as traitors to the anarchist movement and their companions, as they were responsible for sending their alleged friends to prison or harsh sentences, including the death penalty.

=== Bisson and murder ===
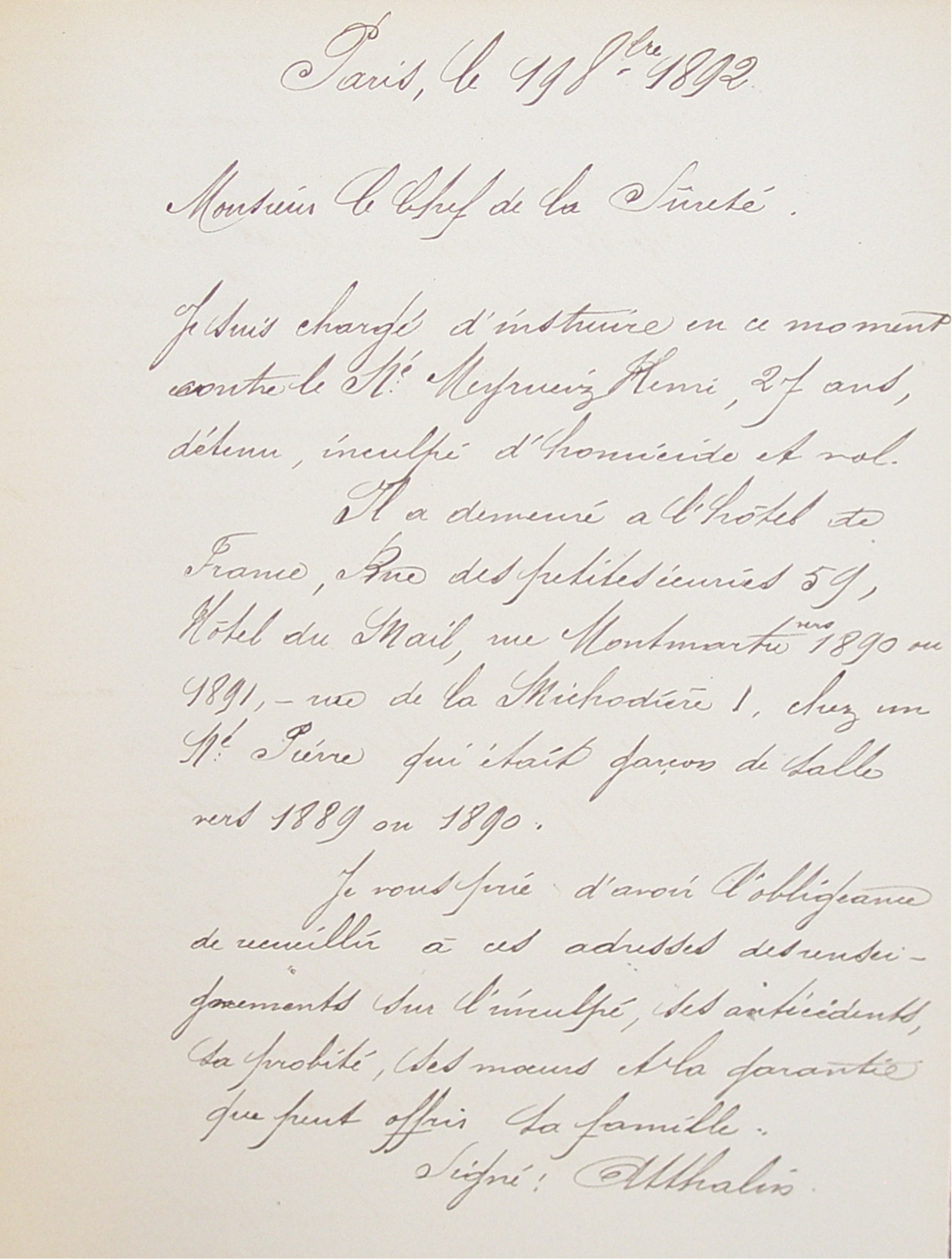
Judge Athalin asking Marie-François Goron for intelligence on Henri Meyrueis (courtesy of Archives anarchistes)

In a parallel development, Gustave Bisson, an eighteen-year-old anarchist, was arrested in Le Havre in early 1892. He was only released after he had given information on his companions. From that point on, he became a fervent police informant, providing information on the anarchist circles in Le Havre. For example, he supplied details about Théodule Meunier or Jean-Pierre François when one of them passed through the city following the Véry bombing. Knowing he had been identified in Le Havre, Bisson moved to Paris, where he used dozens of pseudonyms and moved between different hotels, but was still recognized.

In Paris, Bisson associated with the anarchist group formed around Henri Meyrueis and Bernard Chappuliot. However, they received intelligence from Le Havre informing them that Bisson was a 'snitch' and had betrayed his comrades. They thus would have decided to 'delete' him in response to his betrayal.

On the evening of 22 September 1892, Meyrueis and Chappuliot reportedly arranged to meet the 'Little Pastry Chef' at a dance hall in Saint-Denis. Around midnight, they set off towards the Saint-Denis canal. According to police informant X2 and Marie-François Goron, the head of French Sûreté at the time, David Altéran, who lived in a caravan, was also involved in the case. Goron claimed that Meyrueis and Chappuliot had pretended to go to Altéran's place to discuss a matter with Bisson, making him trust them and follow them.

Chappuliot then allegedly got behind Bisson, put a rope or his belt around his neck, and held him while Meyrueis stabbed him seven times, stopping only when he was certain the 'Little Pastry Chef' was dead. Bisson reportedly tried to plead with them, but without success. The accomplices then threw the body into the canal and went to a friend's house, where they talked about what they had done. The body was found five days later.

=== Aftermath ===
At their friends' place, one of their companions, Hugot, said he was horrified by the act—whereupon they threatened him. He decided to pass the information on to the Sûreté, who arrested Meyrueis and Chappuliot. Meyrueis managed to provide an alibi, but Chappuliot eventually confessed to their actions. They were both tried in March 1893. When Chappuliot saw Hugot testify at his trial, he vehemently declared, among other things:

Say it then, you miserable traitor! If I am here, I owe it to you! You want to send me to the scaffold!

Chappuliot admitted to participating in the act but denied it was premeditated. Both were sentenced to lifelong deportation to a penal colony. Meyrueis died there, assassinated in 1894 by the French army during the massacre of anarchists in the penal colony.

== Bibliography ==
- Bouhey, Vivien (2008), Les Anarchistes contre la République [The Anarchists against the Republic] (in French), Rennes: Presses universitaires de Rennes (PUR)
- Frémion, Yves (2011), Léauthier l'anarchiste. De la propagande par le fait à la révolte des bagnards (1893-1894) [Léauthier the anarchist. From propaganda by the deed to the convicts' revolt (1893-1894)], Paris: L'Échappée, ISBN 9782915830477
- Goron, Marie-François (1903), Les Mémoires de M. Goron, vol. 4, Paris: Flammarion
- Jourdain, Edouard (2013). L'anarchisme [Anarchism] (in French). Paris: La Découverte. ISBN 978-2-7071-9091-8.
- Ward, Colin (2004). Anarchism: A Very Short Introduction. Oxford University Press (OUP).
