= Fourmies massacre =

1891 mass killing of demonstrating workers in France

Fusillade de Fourmies
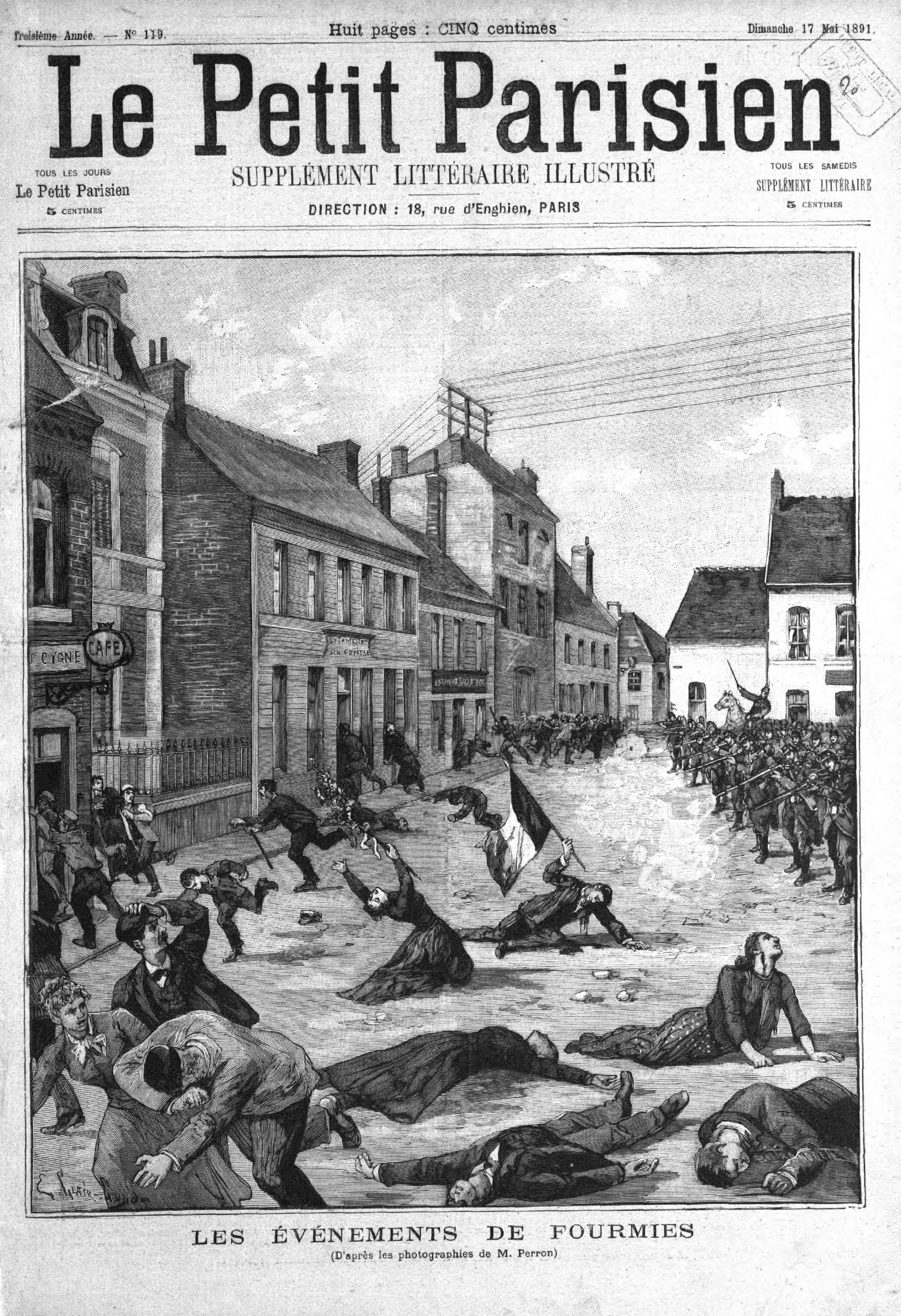
- Cover of the Petit Parisien on 17 May 1891
- Date: 1 May 1891
- Location: Fourmies, Nord, France
- Participants: French citizens

The Fourmies massacre was an event which happened on 1 May 1891 in Fourmies, in the French Nord department. Government troops fired on a peaceful demonstration of workers demanding an eight-hour workday. The troops' action against the workers, claiming "C'est les huit heures qu'il nous faut !" (it's the eight-hour day we need), killed nine people, including two children, and injured 35 people. With the Clichy affair, happening the same day, it was one of the events of this period where the social tensions reached their peak in France.

== Context ==
Fourmies was a small town of 2000 people at the beginning of the 19th century, but it had experienced rapid industrial growth and demographic growth because of the textile industry. In 1891, it had 37 silk and wool mills, and 15 000 people, in majority factory workers.

In the factories, workers worked for 12 hours a day, and six days a week. Their salaries were particularly low.

Starting in 1885, the textile industry in the Nord began to experience difficulties. These difficulties had direct repercussions for the workers, with unemployment and salary reductions when food and lodging expenses were rising.

== History ==
=== Call to strike ===
The right to strike was allowed in France since The Ollivier law on 25 May 1864, but the Trade unions were allowed only since the Waldeck-Rousseau law on 21 March 1884.

== Bibliography ==
- André Pierrard, Jean-Louis Chappat, La Fusillade de Fourmies : Premier mai 1891, Maxima, Paris, 1991 ISBN 2-84003-000-4
- Madeleine Rebérioux, Fourmies et les Premier mai, Fourmies Colloquium 1891/1991 (1991), Éditions de l'Atelier, 1994, ISBN 2-7082-3077-8
- Odette Hardy-Hémery, L'envers d'une fusillade : Fourmies, 1er mai 1891, L'Harmattan, coll. « Collection Chemins de la mémoire », 2000 ISBN 2738442226
- Justinien Raymond, Hippolyte Culine, Dictionnaire biographique, mouvement ouvrier, mouvement social, « Le Maitron », 2010.
