= La Java des Bons-Enfants =

Single by Guy Debord

from the album Pour en finir avec le travail
- Released: 1974
- Genre: Political

La Java des Bons Enfants is an anarchist and situationist song published by Guy Debord (lyrics) and Francis Lemmonnier (music) in 1974. The song appeared in 1974 on the album Pour en finir avec le travail ('An end with work!'), released by RCA. It was attributed—through a situationist prank—to Raymond Callemin, known as Raymond the Science, a famous member of the Bonnot Gang. The reissue of the album by EMP credits the song to its real authors.

In the song, Debord assumes the historical legacy of anarchism, particularly evoking the Ère des attentats (1892–1894), and more specifically the Carmaux-Bons Enfants bombing carried out by Émile Henry and Adrienne Chailliey.

== History ==
=== Context ===
In the 19th century, anarchism emerged and took shape in Europe before spreading. Anarchists advocated a struggle against all forms of domination perceived as unjust including economic domination brought forth by capitalism. They were particularly opposed to the State, seen as the organization that legitimized these dominations through its police, army and propaganda.

During the Ère des attentats (1892–1894), some anarchists engaged in violent conflict with the French State and resorted to terrorist methods to fight against the repression they were subjected to. One of these attacks, carried out by Émile Henry and possibly Adrienne Chailliey, the Carmaux-Bons Enfants bombing, killed four policemen and one civilian.

Anarchists have a long history in France, spanning various periods, but by the mid-20th century, the Fédération anarchiste (FA) was led by Maurice Joyeux and his close associates, who were highly suspicious and hostile toward any possible infiltration by Marxists within the anarchist organization. This control by Joyeux and other activists of his generation led to a serious conflict with younger activists, particularly Guy Debord, who believed that the Fédération anarchiste was run by "tobacconist's shop archeo-anarchists" stuck in the past. Instead of constantly repeating and transmitting outdated ideas, Debord argued, anarchists should engage with the world they lived in and propose new theories to respond to it—even if these drew from Marxism.

This situation led to a break between Debord and the Fédération anarchiste; in The Society of the Spectacle, as a consequence of these conflicts, Debord criticized anarchism as an idealized and abstract notion of revolution. Yet, in the years following the end of the Situationist International, he gradually moved closer once again to the anarchist legacy, which he began to rehabilitate and reuse.

=== La Java des Bons Enfants ===
In 1974, Jacques Le Glou asked Debord to write two songs for his upcoming album Pour en finir avec le travail ('An end to work!'). Debord wrote two songs for it: La Java des Bons Enfants and Le Chant des journées de mai, in which he evokes the figure of Durruti. He hid both under a pseudonym; for La Java des Bons Enfants, Debord chose the name Raymond Caillemin (1890–1913). The music for the piece was composed by Francis Lemmonnier and performed by Jacques Marchais. The first verse reads:

Original	English Translation
Dans la rue des Bons Enfants, On vend tout au plus offrant, Y'avait un commissariat, Et maintenant il n’est plus là. Une explosion fantastique, N’en a pas laissé une brique, On crut qu’c’était Fantômas, Mais c’était la lutte des classes.	On Bons Enfants street, Everything goes to the highest bid, There once stood a police station, Now it’s vanished from sight. A fantastic explosion, Left not one brick standing, They thought it was Fantômas, But it was class struggle.

This final rhyme, between Fantômas and class struggle, illustrates Debord’s intent to present Fantômas as a political and revolutionary figure.

=== Legacy ===
In 1988, the song was covered by the punk band Les Kamionërs du Suicide.

== Bibliography ==
- Angaut, Jean-Christophe (2022). Guy Debord et l’anarchisme [Guy Debord and anarchism] (in French). Paris: Revue Française d'Histoire des Idées Politiques.
- Bouhey, Vivien (2009), Les Anarchistes contre la République [The Anarchists against the Republic] (in French), Rennes: Presses universitaires de Rennes (PUR)
- Corona, René (2014). Java, qu'est-ce que tu fais encore là ? Lire le poème de la Java (PDF) (in French). Agon.
- Jourdain, Edouard (2013). L'anarchisme [Anarchism] (in French). Paris: La Découverte. ISBN 978-2-7071-9091-8.
- Roizès, Philippe (2022). Punk et autonomie en France: convergences et malentendus entre compagnons de route [Punk and autonomy in France: Convergences and misunderstandings among fellow travelers] (in French). Paris: Audimat.
- Ward, Colin (2004). Anarchism: A Very Short Introduction. Oxford University Press (OUP).
