= 20 February 1894 attacks =

1894 anarchist bombing in France

- Part of Ère des attentats
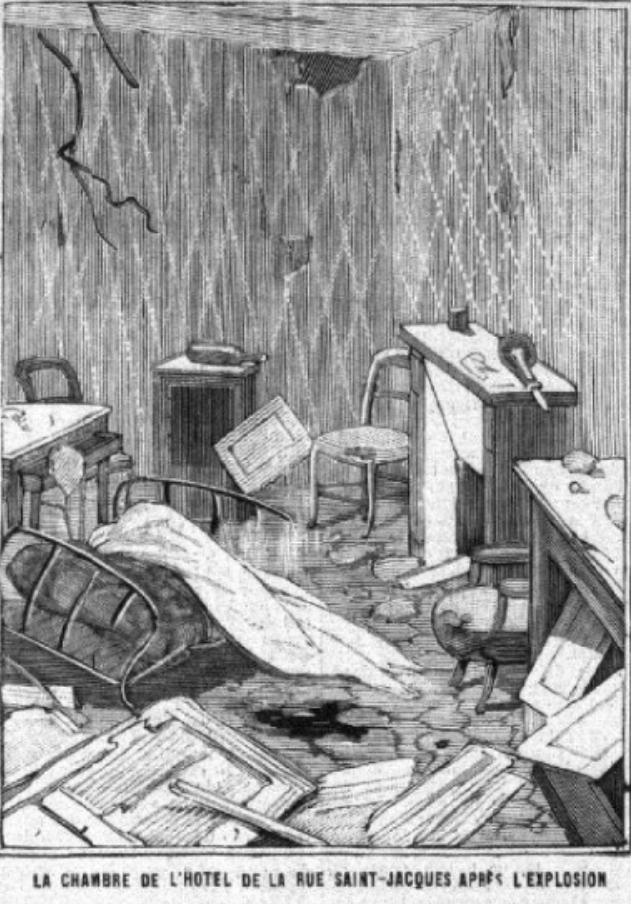
- Representation of the 20 February bombings in Le Petit Parisien: supplément illustré (4 April 1894)
- Location: Rue Saint-Jacques and Rue-Saint Martin, Paris
- Date: 20 February 1894
- Attack type: bombing
- Deaths: 1
- Injuries: 3
- Perpetrator: Désiré Pauwels
- Motive: Anarchism

The 20 February bombings, also known as the Rue Saint-Jacques and Faubourg Saint-Martin bombings were two bomb attacks carried out in Paris on 20 February 1894 by the anarchist militant Désiré Pauwels against the French police and state. Organized six days after the Café Terminus bombing, these attacks occurred during the latter phase of the Ère des attentats (1892–1894).

Pauwels set up booby-trapped devices in two hotel rooms, luring police to the locations. In the first attack, at a hotel on Rue Saint-Jacques, one of the owners of the hotel, a concierge and a policeman were injured when the bomb detonated as the door was opened. The owner died of her injuries in the following days. A second device, planted in a hotel on Faubourg Saint-Martin, was discovered by a policeman who managed to open the door without the bomb detonating and called back-up.

Pauwels evaded capture until his next attack, the Madeleine bombing on 15 March 1894, where he died during the incident.

== History ==
=== Context ===
In the 19th century, anarchism emerged and took shape in Europe before spreading. Anarchists advocated a struggle against all forms of domination perceived as unjust including economic domination brought forth by capitalism. They were particularly opposed to the State, seen as the organization that legitimized these dominations through its police, army and propaganda.

The anarchists became increasingly radicalized in response to various events, particularly the Fourmies massacre, where the army fired on demonstrators, and the Clichy affair, where three anarchists were arrested, beaten with sabres, and deprived of water and medical care for some time before being subjected to a harsh trial. This radicalization led some of them to adopt a confrontational stance with the State through a campaign of terrorist attacks. Following the Saint-Germain bombing and the Clichy bombing (March 1892), their main perpetrator, Ravachol, was executed by the authorities. This situation further radicalized the anarchist militant Émile Henry, who subsequently carried out a series of bombings, including the Carmaux-Bons Enfants bombing (November 1892). After taking refuge in the United Kingdom, Henry returned to Paris at the start of 1894, where he carried out the Café Terminus bombing on 12 February 1894.

=== Preparations and bombings ===
Désiré Pauwels was an anarchist militant closely associated with Henry. Already active in anarchist activism since at least 1885, when he founded the group 'Anarchist Youth of Saint-Denis', Pauwels met several other anarchists in the circles he frequented, such as Auguste Vaillant and Sébastien Faure, with whom he later came into conflict. By this time, Pauwels was already making bombs and managed to evade French police surveillance on multiple occasions. After seeking refuge in Luxembourg and subsequently being expelled from the country, he returned to Paris in 1892. By then, Pauwels had gained a reputation for being a violent and 'unbalanced' figure within the anarchist circles he evolved in.

Four hours after the Café Terminus bombing, upon learning of the explosion, Pauwels may have gone with the three other friends of Henry—Armand Matha, Ortiz, and Millet—to the room he occupied. The militants managed to bypass the concierge and carried enough explosives with them to produce between twelve and fifteen bombs. He decided to take action while his companion, Henry, was in prison awaiting trial. On the evening of 12 February 1894, the same day as the Café Terminus bombing, Pauwels rented a room at the Hôtel des Carmes, posing as a traveler arriving from Barcelona, which he did by speaking Spanish with an employee. He brought luggage that likely contained the explosives he used to assemble the bombs.

On 20 February 1894, eight days later, Pauwels went to two "even shabbier" hotels, hotel Calabresi located on 69 Rue Saint-Jacques and the other on 47 Faubourg Saint-Martin. He placed bombs in the two rooms he rented there, designed to explode as soon as the doors were opened. The militant then sent two notes to two different police stations, presenting himself as a certain Étienne Rabardy – in reality, the identity of one of his coworkers whose papers he had stolen – and announcing his intention to commit suicide. In these notes, he requested that the two officers responsible for the arrest of Ravachol come to see him. These requests were not followed up, and the police instead decided to send different officers to assess the situation.

On Rue Saint-Jacques, the officer dispatched to investigate opened the door with one of the hotel's concierges. The bomb exploded, injuring both lightly and striking Madame Calabresi, the owner's wife, who was sleeping when the explosions happened. She died from her injuries in the following days. At the other hotel, the officer managed to open the door without the bomb detonating. After analyzing this second bomb, it appeared to the police that a similar explosive device had been planted in a bank a few days earlier, although it was not certain that Pauwels was responsible.

=== Aftermath ===
Pauwels managed to evade the police until his next attack, the Madeleine bombing on 15 March 1894, where he met his death. Henry, who was in prison at the time, initially believed it was Théodule Meunier, but Pauwels was identified at the morgue by his stepfather, who refused to claim the body. Henry was sentenced to death and guillotined.

Meanwhile, an anarchist militant turned himself in to the police in Béziers, claiming to be named Rabardy, a close friend of Henry, and the author of the bombings. However, he was quickly ruled out as a suspect.

== Bibliography ==
- Jourdain, Edouard (2013). L'anarchisme [Anarchism]. Paris: La Découverte. ISBN 978-2-7071-9091-8.
- Merriman, John M. (2016). The dynamite club: how a bombing in fin-de-siècle Paris ignited the age of modern terror. Yale University Press. ISBN 978-0-300-21792-6.
- Ward, Colin (2004). Anarchism: A Very Short Introduction. Oxford University Press (OUP).
