= Adrienne Chailliey =

French anarchist and feminist (1860 – after 1900)

- Born: 15 June 1859; Skikda
- Died: 27 August 1937 (aged 78); Auch
- Occupation: Singer, embroiderer, anarchist, militant

Adrienne Chailliey (1860 – 1937), also known as Marie Puget, was a French embroiderer, singer, anarchist and feminist activist. She is best known for her artistic career as well as her probable involvement in the Carmaux-Bons Enfants bombing and the Ère des attentats (1892–1894). She was also engaged in first-wave feminist activism.

After a childhood marked by abuse and confinement in several boarding schools, Chailliey managed to escape and reach Paris in the 1880s. Becoming politically active in anarchist and feminist circles, she began performing and singing anarchist songs in the capital. As she gradually gained prominence as an anarchist artist and mingled with other artists, she met Émile Henry, whom she may have sheltered in early 1892. Chailliey, Henry, and other anarchist militants were likely responsible for the Carmaux-Bons Enfants bombing on 8 November 1892, targeting the headquarters of the Compagnie minière de Carmaux. She likely placed the bomb while Henry stood watch outside. The explosion killed four police officers and a company employee. Chailliey was never put on trial for her role in the bombing, though she was arrested.

Chailliey remained involved in feminist activism and spoke for women's rights at feminist gatherings. After one of these meetings, she was assaulted by two men dissatisfied with her speech as she left the venue. She died in Auch in 1937.

== Early life ==
Adrienne Stéphanie Chailliey was born in 1860 in Philippeville, French Algeria. The daughter of a gendarmerie captain and the sister of a Saint-Cyr military academy student, she suffered abuse from her mother during her childhood. Around the age of 11, she was sent to a Catholic boarding school in Nice, where she was beaten by the teaching staff and received little education beyond practical skills for a career as a seamstress. She eventually escaped from the boarding school and made her way to Marseille, where she was arrested by the gendarmes and returned to her family. Her mother placed her in a Corsican boarding school until the age of 20 when she escaped again and fled to Paris.

== Activism ==
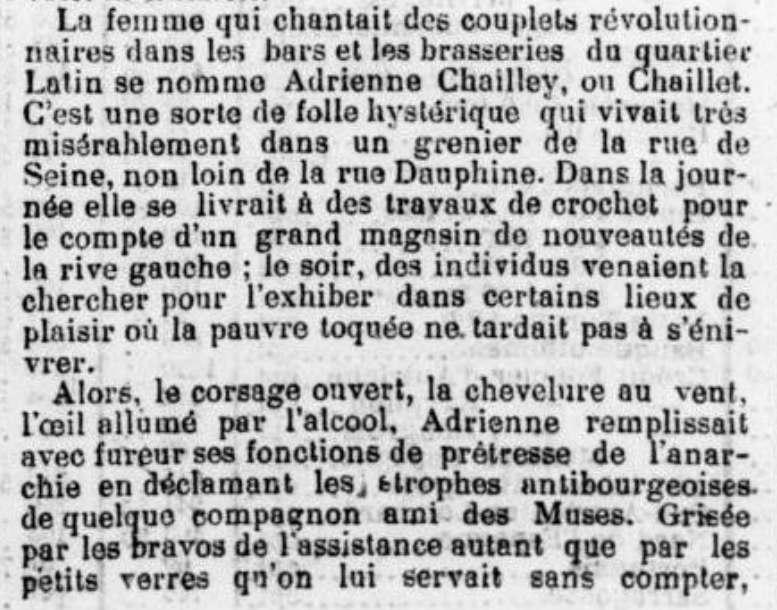
Misogynist characterization of Adrienne Chailliey in the conservative Journal de la ville de Saint-Quentin (24 February 1894)

In the French capital, Chailliey joined anarchist and feminist circles. She frequented anarchist and feminist bars in the Latin Quarter, where she began performing songs such as La Ravachole and La Carmagnole as early as 1887. Within these networks, she associated with other artists, particularly painters and sculptors. During this period, Chailliey lived in a small attic room on the Left Bank of the Seine and worked as an embroiderer during the day.

She quickly became one of the most well-known anarchist singers in the capital, spreading anarchist ideology through her performances, including during family evenings. As a result, she became a target of the conservative press, particularly the Journal de Saint-Quentin, which portrayed her in a highly negative light—as a woman manipulated by other anarchists who supposedly took advantage of her and led her astray. The newspaper also depicted her as a hysterical and alcoholic madwoman, labeling her a "priestess of anarchy".

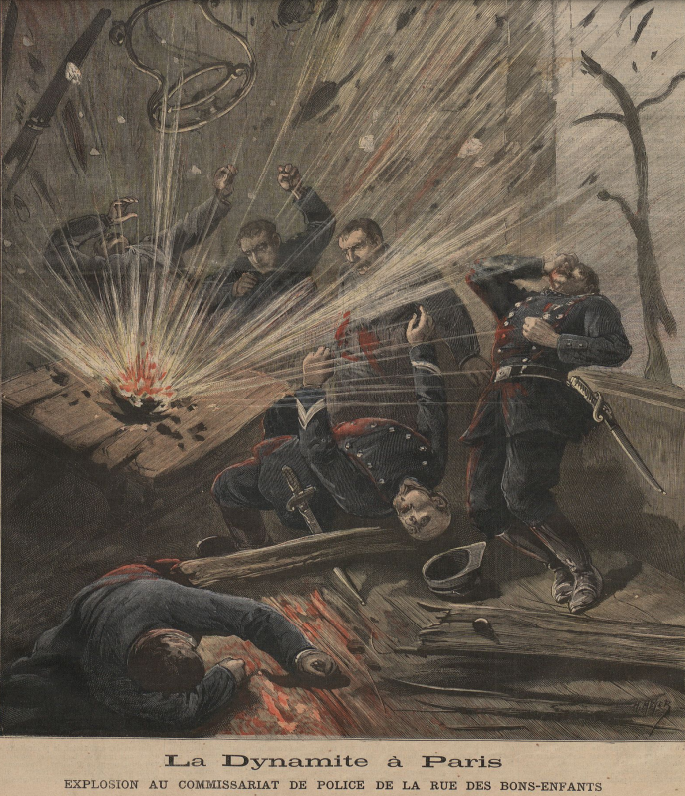
Representation of the Carmaux-Bons Enfants bombing in Le Petit Journal (19 November 1892)

At the beginning of the year 1892 and the Era of Attacks (1892–1894), it is possible that she hosted Émile Henry at her home for some time. Henry was close to her and in the process of political radicalization. He began as early as March 1892 to prepare explosives, according to historian of French anarchism Vivien Bouhey. In August of the same year, the Carmaux strike began after the abrupt dismissal of a unionist, Jean-Baptiste Calvignac, and quickly became a subject of national attention. Chailliey's reaction is unknown, but Henry, with whom she was close, considered the agreement signed between socialists like Jean Jaurès and the employers' association – an agreement sending workers back to work poorer than before – to be a betrayal by the socialists. It is highly likely that Chailliey, Henry, his brother Jean-Charles Fortuné Henry, and other anarchist militants from a small group, such as Paul Bonnard, devised a plot aiming to blow up the company's headquarters in Paris. Chailliey's participation in the plot, which was identified by the French police and Bouhey, was rendered invisible by Henry's trial, where he assumed full responsibility for the preparation and execution of the attack, presumably to save his accomplices.

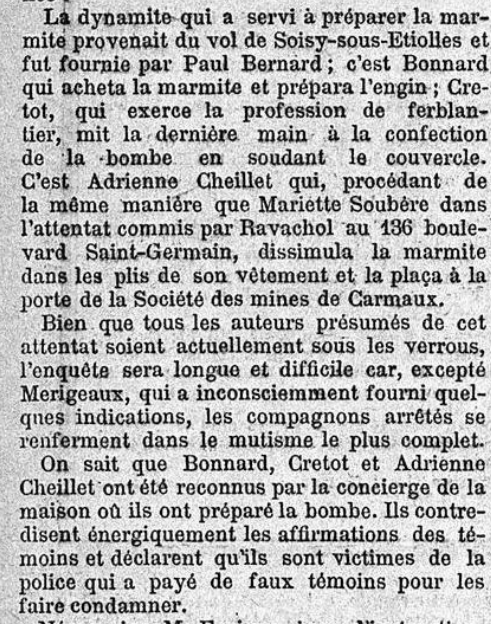
Names of the perpetrators of the Carmaux-Bons Enfants bombing in the Journal des débats politiques et littéraires (22 February 1894)

In any case, on 8 November 1892, Henry and Chailliey likely went together to the headquarters of the Carmaux Mining Company. Chailliey would have taken the bomb before going to plant it herself. Several witnesses identified a woman as the bomb carrier. Henry kept watch. The police were called to take possession of this suspicious package and returned to the police station on rue des Bons-Enfants. While attempting to open it, the bomb exploded, killing four police officers and the company employee who accompanied them. This was the deadliest attack during the French Ère des attentats (1892–1894).

Henry fled, possibly after staying at her place for a short time, and made his way to the United Kingdom and Belgium. Chailliey underwent a complete change in attitude that appeared highly suspicious to informants of the French police. She abruptly distanced herself from anarchism – at least outwardly – and ceased all activism during this period. She also began attempting to establish an alibi by asking a friend to testify that she had been with her on the day of the attack. All these rather unnatural developments seemed very suspicious to the French authorities and informants, who increasingly focused on her case. In talks with other militants, Chailliey repeatedly asserted that it was Henry who had carried out the attack – which set the police, until then unaware of the perpetrators of the bombing, on the trail of the exile.

At the same time, she attended feminist meetings in Paris and was invited by her friend, Marie-Rose Astié de Valsayre, founder of the Ligue de l’affranchissement des femmes ("League for the Emancipation of Women"), to participate in a rally in April 1893. There she defended the economic equality of women. She was attacked while returning home by two men who kicked and caned her. She had to be carried home by gendarmes but refused to file a complaint about the attack.

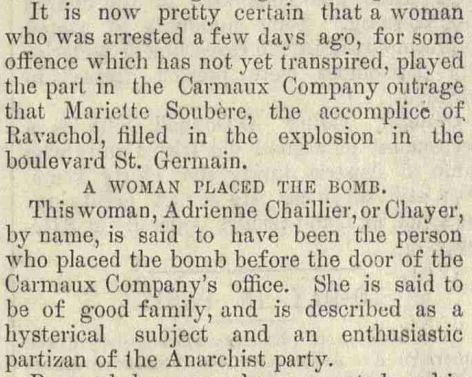
Adrienne Chailliey in the New York Herald (23 February 1894)

While the police were tightening their surveillance and arrested her in January 1894, Henry carried out the Café Terminus bombing on 12 February 1894, an attack considered a foundational event of modern terrorism. Arrested and with all attention focused on him, he publicly admitted to perpetrating the Carmaux-Bons Enfants bombing. During this period, her brother worked as a prison guard at Saint-Lazare Prison. She was arrested after being denounced by an accomplice named Mérigeau but refused to provide any information to authorities. Chailliey would not cooperate with police, offered no alibi, and vigorously defended her ideals. However, she wasn't formally affiliated with any specific group, which made it difficult for police to fully understand the situation surrounding her. When arrested, a sculptor connected to the activist had his premises searched, but nothing was found.

During a confrontation with Chailliey and Paul Bonnard—another accomplice whom she had met the day before the attack—Henry turned pale, admitted knowing Bonnard but not Chailliey. On that occasion, he winked at her when claiming sole responsibility for the attack in her presence. Moreover, he later asked if she had been released, which seems to indicate that he indeed knew her. Henry described the way he carried out the attack in precise detail and insisted he had acted alone, presenting a plausible scenario. Henry was guillotined and Chailliey was not put on trial despite having been arrested, either because the police lacked sufficient evidence or specific testimonies regarding her involvement to convict her, or because Henry had already taken full responsibility. She was released along with other potential accomplices in the attack.

=== Late life ===
In 1897, she fell into poverty when the state refused to allow her to work as a tobacconist at a shop she inherited from her mother. She appeared on a list of anarchists created by the Paris police some time after 1900.

She died in Auch on 27 August 1937.

== Bibliography ==
- Badier, Walter (2010), "Émile Henry, le « Saint-Just de l'Anarchie »" [Émile Henry, the 'Saint-Just of Anarchy'], Parlement[s], vol. 14, no. 2, Paris: Revue d'histoire politique, pp. 159–171, doi:10.3917/parl.014.0159
- Bouhey, Vivien (2009), Les Anarchistes contre la République [The Anarchists against the Republic], Rennes: Presses universitaires de Rennes (PUR)
- Ferragu, Gilles (2019), "L'écho des bombes : l'invention du terrorisme « à l'aveugle » (1893–1895)" [The echo of bombs: The invention of indiscriminate terrorism (1893–1895)], Ethnologie française, 49 (1): 21–31, doi:10.3917/ethn.191.0021
- Merriman, John M. (2016). The dynamite club: how a bombing in fin-de-siècle Paris ignited the age of modern terror. Yale University Press. ISBN 978-0-300-21792-6.
