= Émile Henry =

Émile Henry may refer to:

- Emile Henry (ceramic), a French manufacturer of ceramic products
- Émile Henry (anarchist) (1872–1894), French anarchist
