= Le Forçat =

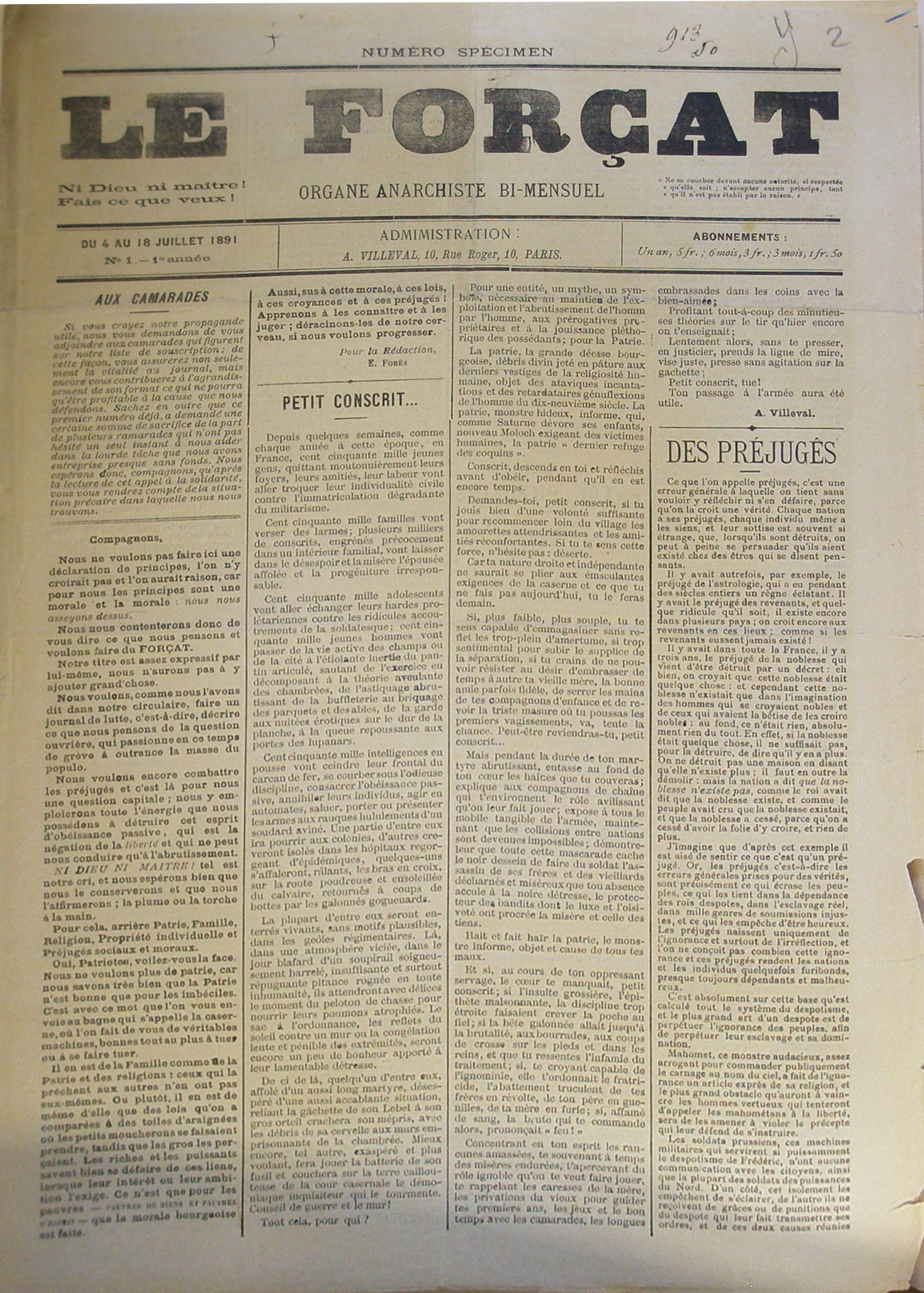
- Front page of the first issue of Le Forçat (4 July 1891)
- Founded: 1891
- Political alignment: Anarchism
- Language: French
- Ceased publication: 1891
- Headquarters: Paris

Le Forçat ('The Convict/Penal Deportee') was a French-speaking anarchist newspaper published in July 1891 by various anarchists, possibly including Émile Henry. The newspaper ceased publication after its second issue.

Its managers, administrator Albin Villeval and printer-manager Édouard Florès, were sentenced in July and August 1891 to six months and fifteen months in prison respectively for "incitement to murder and looting" and "incitement to murder and arson".

== History ==
The newspaper Le Forçat was founded in July 1891, which is when its first and only two issues were published. The paper's epigraphs were: "Neither God, nor Master, do as you please!" and "Do not bow before any authority, no matter how respected; do not accept any principle until it is established by reason".

According to René Bianco, a historian of the anarchist press, it's plausible that the signature "E. Henry" found in the newspaper belongs to Émile Henry. Claude Tillier was also published in its pages. The Etiévant brothers, Henri and Georges, also participated to it.

Constance Bantman, a historian specializing in the anarchist movement between 1880 and 1930, cites Le Forçat as an example of anarchist publications from that period that featured highly controversial titles, in this case, the name refers to imprisonment and prisoners sent to the French penal colonies or 'bagnes'.

Albin Villeval, the newspaper's administrator, was put on trial as early as July 1891. He was sentenced by the Seine Assize Court to six months in prison for "incitement to murder and looting". Édouard Forès, the newspaper's printer-manager, was also prosecuted for the same reasons and sentenced to fifteen months in prison for "incitement to murder and arson".

== Works ==
=== 1st issue (courtesy of Archives anarchistes) ===
- Aux Camarades by Édouard Forès, explaining the reasons and motivations behind the newspaper's publication
- Petit Conscrit... by Albin Villeval, an anti-militarist text calling on conscripts to shoot officers
- Des préjugés retaking a text by Joseph Lequinio, a politician from the French Revolution
- Le droit à la Révolte, a poetic text supporting the anarchist revolution
- Entre purotins by Sérof, a fictional account of the meeting between one 'Polyte' and one 'Gugusse', who discuss anarchist issues
- Le militarisme retaking a text by Claude Tillier, a short anti-militarist article
- Patrie ! by Émile Henry, a text opposing the concept of homeland and patriotism
- Portrait à la Plume !, a polemic against a political/financial figure (?)
- Le Chômage, anarchist theory and a call to 'suppress the honey thieves'
- Forçats, critiques of the authoritarianism of other left-wing movements and a call to also do an internal revolution
- Nouvelles de l'étranger, updates on the anarchist movement in Norway, Russia, and Chile.
- Les Grèves, news of strikes (Rome, Roubaix, Dublin)
- Les Insoumis, an anarchist song
- Tribune Libre, a platform for people wishing to speak
- Les Journaux du Peuple, reflections on the anarchist and popular press, suggestions for reading Le Père Peinard, La Révolte, or Le Réveil des mineurs
- L’anti-patriote, announcement of the founding of the anarchist newspaper L'anti-patriote
- Sonnets de la Révolte, an anarchist song
- Mots de combat including an excerpt from Étienne de La Boétie, and excerpts from other radical texts
- Le Forçat au Populo, an anarchist song

== Bibliography ==
- Bantman, Constance (2013). The French Anarchists in London, 1880-1914 : Exile and Transnationalism in the First Globalisation. Oxford University Press (OUP). ISBN 978-1-78138-658-3.
