= Désiré Pauwels =

Belgian anarchist active in France (1864–1894)

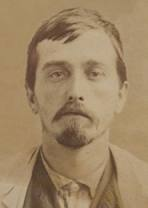
- Born: January 29, 1864; Courcelles, Belgium
- Died: March 15, 1894 (aged 30); Paris, France
- Occupation: Tanner
- Known for: Anarchist attacks

Désiré Joseph Pauwels (1864–1894) was a Belgian anarchist active with France's propaganda by deed anarchists.

== Early life ==
Désiré Joseph Pauwels was born January 29, 1864, in Courcelles, Belgium. His father died soon after his birth. Pauwels was deaf and had eye disease as a child. He left Courcelles as an early teenager and returned in 1884, when he was drafted at random for military service. He left the country to evade his draft.

Pauwels was known by different names: Jean, Amédée, and Philibert Désiré Joseph. Little is known of his biography.

== Career ==
Pauwels lived in Saint-Denis, Paris, from 1883 to early 1891 and worked at the Combes and Oriol tannery. Pauwels was active during the Ère des attentats (1892-1894), a period of anarchist political violence in France marked by a significant wave of attacks targeting symbols of power, state institutions, and emblematic places of bourgeois life. Following the execution of Auguste Vaillant on 5 February 1894, Pauwels rented a room at the Hôtel des Carmes on the same day as the Café Terminus attack by Émile Henry (12 February 1894), using a Barcelona cover story, and began preparing his devices. His attack at the Madeleine on 15 March 1894 represented a shift in anarchist tactics from targeting specific individuals toward attacking symbolic locations of bourgeois and Catholic life. The French press reacted with ridicule rather than recognition of the attack's ideological motivation, making Pauwels a target of scorn rather than the feared figure he had intended to become. His body was so disfigured by the explosion that the nascent forensic police had to take over the identification, marking an early milestone in the use of forensic science in criminal investigations in France.. He joined Les Egaux de Montmartre, a small anarchist club with dedicated propagandists of the deed, where he was known by the nickname "Nez-Pointu" (pointy nose). There he met Chaumentin, Bastard, Béala, and Ravachol. But Pauwels broke with the group after an argument and the group dissolved in 1886. He also potentially co-edited the Terre et Liberté periodical in 1884 and 1885.

He married Albertine Lordon (born 1863) in 1886 and had a daughter, Gabrielle. Pauwels then worked for the Delaunay-Belleville and Floquet fur merchants and tannery in Saint-Denis.

After the May Day 1891 anarchist brawl in Levallois-Perret, the Saint-Denis police sought Pauwel's arrest and expulsion. He hid at Paul Reclus's house for multiple weeks before he was found. Pauwels went to Luxembourg, where his wife and daughter joined him. After six months, Pauwels returned to France to evade the Luxembourg police. His wife decided against this life and returned to her parents in Saint-Denis.

Pauwels worked for several months in a soda factory in Varangéville in 1892, where Paul Reclus was a chemist. They and a few other workers were fired after being outed as anarchists. Pauwels traveled Europe's French-speaking countries to find work, including England and Germany. From November to December 1892, Pauwels shared a room in Geneva with an anarchist before working as a tanner in Lausanne. He lived near Barcelona in January 1893 and left after the Liceu bombing in November. Pauwels returned to France and worked in a factory with Auguste Vaillant and briefly lived with him.

Pauwels planned to attack two anti-anarchist police commissioners, Bélouino and Dresch, who were responsible for suppressing their meetings and speech and arresting Ravachol. Pauwels assumed the identity of the Rouen mechanic Etienne Rabardy and, in February 1894, set a reversal bomb trap in a Saint-Jacques hotel room that would fall and explode when the hotel door opened. To coax Bélouino to the room, Pauwels sent a letter announcing his suicide, but another police officer ultimately detonated the bomb. He was injured but one other person was killed and three others injured. Pauwels replicated the trap at another hotel in Saint-Martin that month intended for Dresch. The police evacuated the hotel and detonated the bomb without injuries.

== Death ==
Prior to his death, Pauwels wrote that he carried volatile bombs on him for days, that he intended to target a church to scare café and churchgoers, and that if caught, he would not speak and die like Ravachol and Vaillant. Pauwels died March 15, 1894, in Paris's La Madeleine church from an explosion of his own bomb, officially ruled an accident. But since there was a bullet in Pauwels's head that did not match with the gun's firing pin, his friend, the anarchist Paul Reclus, questioned whether it was a suicide, perhaps to not be caught after the bomb's accidental detonation. A return ticket to Barcelona was in his pocket.
