= Émile Henry (anarchist) =

French anarchist (1872–1894)

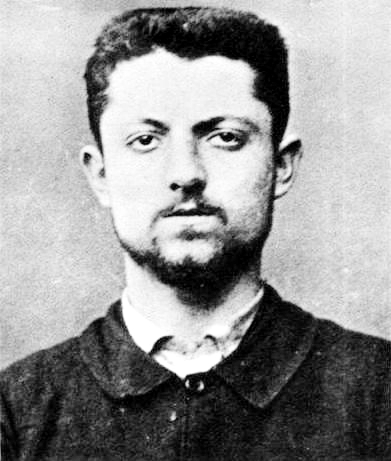
- Émile Henry's mugshot by Alphonse Bertillon (1894)
- Born: 26 September 1872
- Died: 21 May 1894 (aged 21); Paris
- Resting place: Cemetery of Limeil-Brévannes
- Alma mater: Lycée Jean-Baptiste-Say
- Occupation: Writer, anarchist, anarchist terrorist
- Parent(s): Fortuné Henry; Rose Caubet
- Relatives: Jean-Charles Fortuné Henry

Émile Henry (26 September 1872 – 21 May 1894), nicknamed 'the Saint-Just of Anarchy', was an individualist and illegalist anarchist militant and terrorist. He is best known for his terrorist actions and is considered one of the main founders of modern terrorism.

Born into a family of exiled Communards, he moved to France in 1880, where he pursued studies that promised him a prestigious career. However, after witnessing the misery and social inequalities of his society, he abandoned his studies to join Parisian anarchist circles, particularly under the influence of his older brother, Jean-Charles Fortuné Henry. Associating with various anarchists of the time, especially Charles Malato, who became his friend, he closely followed the beginning of the Ère des attentats, literally "Era of Attacks" (1892–1894) and the first attacks of Ravachol. As he became increasingly isolated, Henry paid close attention to the Carmaux strike and considered the agreement signed by the employers and socialists a betrayal of the proletariat. He then organized the Carmaux-Bons-Enfants bombing (8 November 1892), possibly with his brother and Adrienne Chailliey, targeting the headquarters of the Carmaux Mining Company by planting a parcel bomb. This bomb, retrieved by the police and an employee, exploded at the Bons-Enfants police station, killing four policemen and the employee. This was the deadliest attack of the Ère des attentats.

Although Henry managed to avoid strong suspicion, he fled France and took refuge in the United Kingdom. From this base and Belgium, in 1893, he participated in a series of robberies with the Ortiz gang, notably with Paolo Chiericotti and Léon Ortiz, following the emerging anarchist ideology of illegalism. His robberies and movements during this period are difficult to reconstruct, but he took part in the 1893 general strike in Belgium, where the army fired on the population. Henry himself fired at the police on this occasion. At the beginning of 1894, he returned to Paris, where the authorities were increasingly searching for him. The news of Auguste Vaillant's execution (5 February 1894) pushed him to act, seeking to assassinate the French president, Sadi Carnot. Failing to approach the Élysée Palace with a bomb, he went instead to the Café Terminus, where he threw his bomb into the crowd—killing one person and injuring about twenty others. Pursued by the police, at whom he fired, he was finally arrested.

The Café Terminus bombing and Henry's trial were central events in the emergence of modern terrorism. By targeting an adversary identified with society as a whole, he ushered terrorism into the era of mass terrorism, a phenomenon that continues into the 21st century. Unlike Ravachol or Vaillant, his predecessors, he did not present himself as an avenger but rather as a fighter who must destroy "bourgeois society" or die. He was sentenced to death, which did not seem to trouble him; he refused to appeal—declaring that he did not recognize "bourgeois justice"—and was executed on 21 May 1894 in Paris. The motivations behind this attack are debated, but they could range from a thought-out radicalization to romantic reasons aimed at impressing Élisa Gauthey, the anarchist with whom Henry was in love.

His action was rejected by some anarchists in France, who began to question the use of terrorism to achieve their goals after this event. Thus, he foreshadowed the end of the Ère des attentats and the evolution of anarchism from propaganda by the deed to other forms of struggle, such as anarcho-syndicalism. However, some, especially within individualist anarchism, used him as a symbol and hero of their struggle. Even though he did not influence later anarchist terrorism, the directions he gave to modern terrorism continued into the 21st century within very different movements.

== Biography ==
=== Early life and studies ===
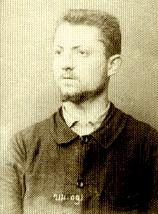
Police mugshot of Émile Henry (1894), after his final arrest

Joseph Félix Émile Henry was born on 26 September 1872 in a small town near Barcelona. He was born in Spain because his father, Fortuné Henry, a former Communard now a coal miner, had been sentenced to death in absentia and had taken refuge there to escape French justice. His mother, Rose Caubet, who had worked as a seamstress before their exile, decided to follow him, and the couple settled in Catalonia. Émile was the youngest of his siblings; he had several brothers, including Jean-Charles Fortuné Henry, who would later become an anarchist activist like him, and a sister, Marie Constance Gabrielle Henry, who died in infancy. Taking advantage of a general amnesty in 1880, the family returned to Paris and settled at 5 Rue de Jouy in the fourth arrondissement of the capital. However, Fortuné Henry died a few months later from mercury poisoning, forcing Caubet to seek income to support her children and granting Henry the status of a ward of the city of Paris. This was done by setting up a drinking establishment on the ground floor of their home, called 'La Buvette de l'Espérance'.

Their family was relatively well-off, and Henry excelled in his studies at the Lycée Jean-Baptiste-Say, passing his baccalauréat in sciences a year early, at the age of seventeen. Destined for a promising career, he pursued scientific studies in preparatory classes and was eligible for admission to the École Polytechnique. However, he decided not to take the oral entrance exam, justifying his choice to his professors by citing, first, his reluctance to pursue a military career and, second, an opportunity offered by a family member—a wealthy industrialist—who had proposed that he become his private secretary. Henry was deeply influenced by the memory of the Paris Commune and the legacy of his father, who had a significant impact on him. He attempted to take part in a few spiritualism sessions to communicate with his father's soul but quickly deemed it a useless practice, less precise than the sciences he was studying.

=== Politicization, radicalization, love ===
It was in this first job as a personal secretary that Henry became aware of the harshness of society. He quickly resigned, refusing to oversee workers in Italy on behalf of his industrialist relative. Upon returning to Paris, he spent three months unemployed, and during this period, he became increasingly conscious of the social inequalities dividing French society. Henry wrote about this time:

Everywhere I went, I witnessed the same suffering among some, the same pleasures among others.

Henry also wrote about other issues, such as the monopolization of intellectual knowledge by the bourgeoisie and the morality of his society. Thus, he opposed the view that a bourgeois, being an exploiter in his view, could be considered an 'honest man'. More broadly, Henry perceived the society he lived in as profoundly shocking and revolting. Increasingly outraged by the injustices he witnessed, Henry began sheltering activists or people in need if they required a place to stay. He stole food to feed beggars he encountered on the streets—even stealing a cow for a starving woman. He also gave money to the poor.

Moreover, his elder brother, Fortuné, became involved in the anarchist movement, where he established himself as a recognized speaker at anarchist meetings. Émile assisted him in organizing these gatherings and gradually embraced anarchist ideas through his contact with and influence from his brother. Henry likely joined anarchist circles around November 1890 and quickly became an active and 'able to act' militant. Well integrated into the anarchist network of the French capital, he spent the year 1891 engaging with Parisian anarchist circles. He also began writing for a series of anarchist publications, such as l'Endehors or probably also Le Forçat, where an "E. Henry" published in 1891. In particular, he met Charles Malato, who quickly became one of his close friends and introduced him to smaller anarchist groups. During this time, he worked in various jobs, which he performed fairly well. Malato noted his determined character—he would engage in anarchist discussions until late at night and still wake up early in the morning to go to work.

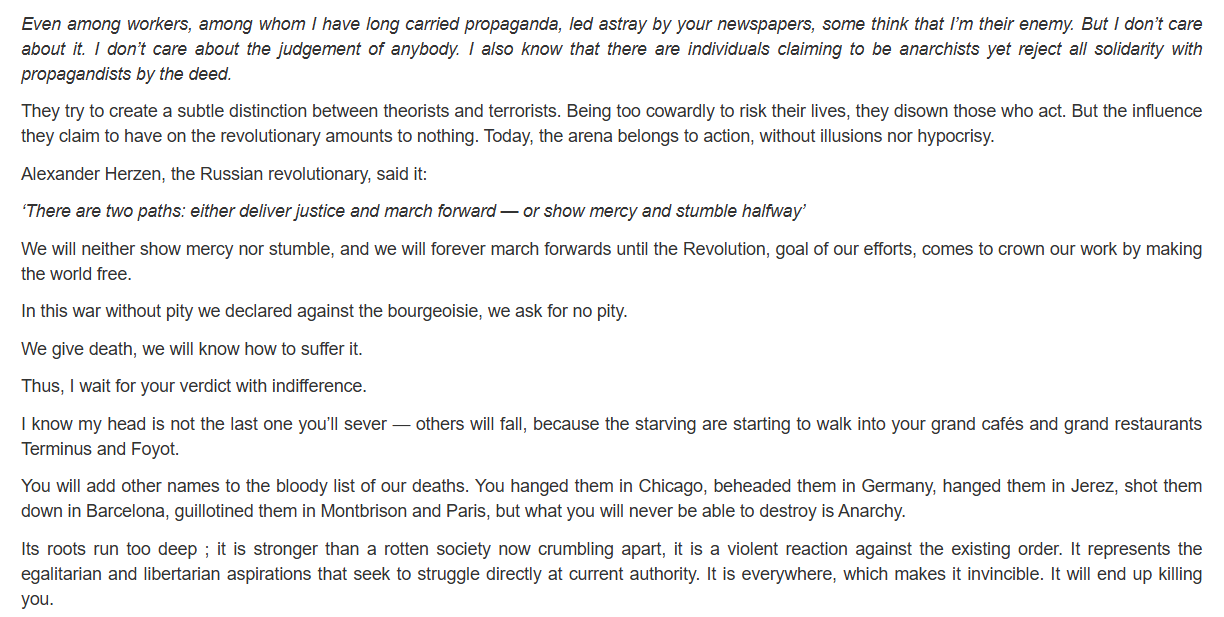
Conclusion of Henry's trial declaration, attacking anarchists and workers who would refuse propaganda by the deed

In any case, Henry fell in love with Élisa Gauthey, a Parisian anarchist activist who was married. He met her through his brother, who often visited the Gautheys, and he quickly became infatuated with her. One day, when she offered Fortuné to write her a poem, Émile volunteered to write it instead. She was surprised but accepted. The young man, then 19 years old, wrote her several poems, which she received without much interest, merely finding them 'amusing'. While the Gautheys were in Brévannes, at the house where Rose Caubet was living, Henry sought every opportunity to approach Élisa and speak with her. One day, he fainted upon seeing her kiss her husband. When she came to his side to help him recover, he woke up and confessed his feelings to her, which made her laugh. Hurt by her reaction, he replied that one day she would see how much he loved her. After this incident, he returned to Paris and wrote to her in September 1891, apologizing for what he had said and asking for her patience with him. Later, Henry kept a small lock of hair that Gauthey had given him, which the police found on him when they arrested him following his attacks.

Although he still claimed to be in love with her in his letters, he began to adopt a more contemplative and detached demeanor, according to Merriman. He stopped visiting his mother, and she no longer received any news from him; Malato also noticed a change in the young man.

According to Maitron and Bouhey, this romantic disappointment should not be seen as the cause of his radicalization, as they reject such a psychological interpretation of his life. Conversely, Petit considers this interpretation the most plausible, believing Henry's radicalization was primarily influenced by both his romantic feelings for Gauthey and his desire to impress her.

Henry avoided military service by having a letter sent to his mother from Berlin in his name—likely sent by one of his companions. In this letter, the anarchist told her that he had left France to evade military service. As the police were unable to locate him, he was declared a deserter in February 1892.

=== Ère des attentats ===
==== Carmaux-Bons Enfants bombing ====
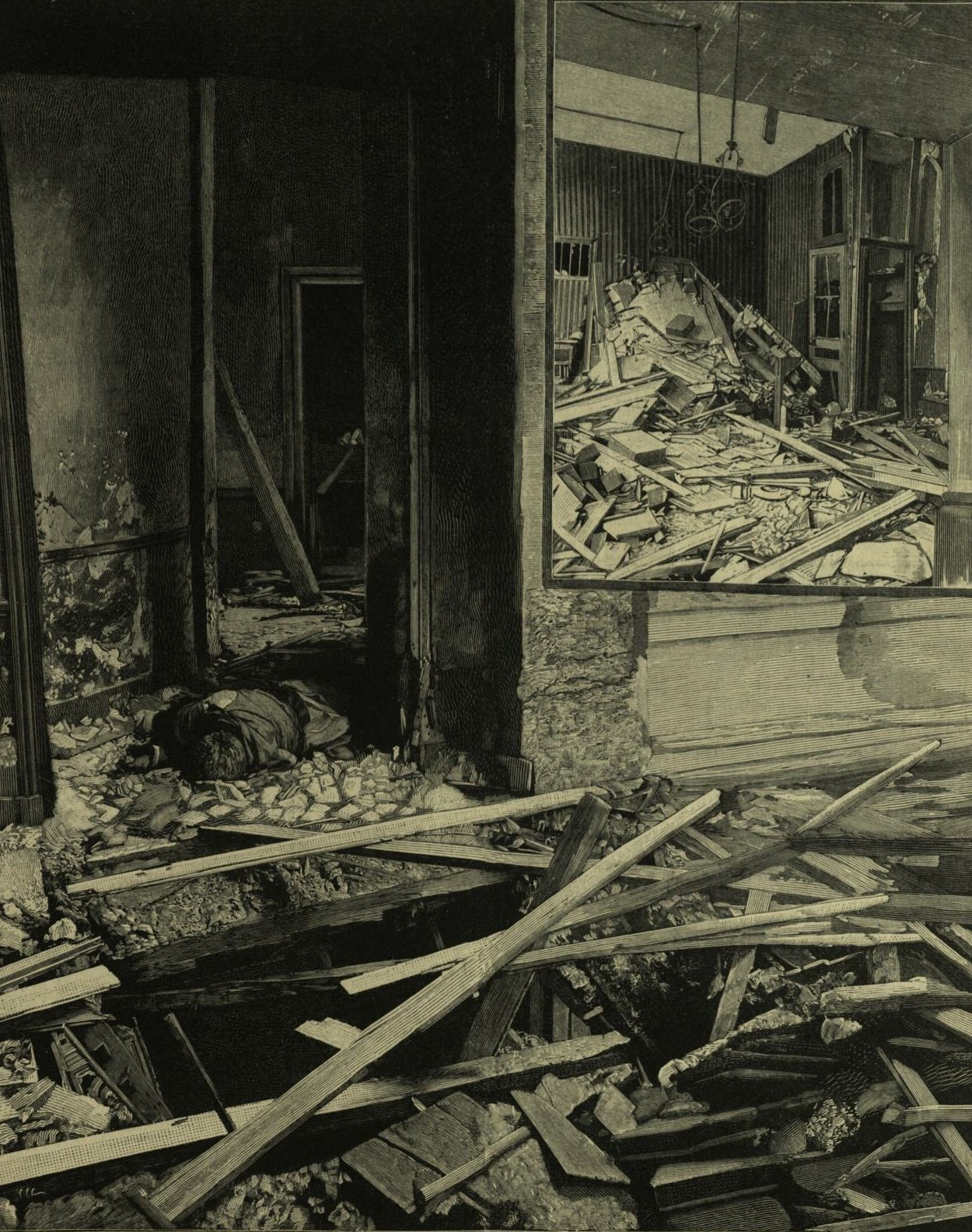
Representation of the Bons Enfants bombing in L'Illustrazione Italiana (20 November 1892)

During the Era of Attacks (1892–1894), which began with the Saint-Germain bombing on 11 March 1892, carried out by Ravachol, Henry was initially opposed to anarchist terrorism and to Ravachol himself, according to Merriman and Badier, who provide some of his writings. He later would have changed his stance. They argue that Henry's thinking evolved, and he gradually came to support the use of propaganda by the deed after Ravachol's execution (11 July 1892).

During this period, even as he spent time with and somewhat reconciled with his brother Fortuné, Henry viewed Charles Malato, Errico Malatesta, and likely his brother, as "pontiffs" who aimed to "hierarchize anarchy". His criticism stemmed from their detached and theoretical approach to propaganda of the deed, viewing them as people who talked about it without never concretely involving themselves in such projects.

Conversely, Bouhey contends that while Ravachol's execution may have further radicalized Henry and pushed him to take action, he was already on this path by March 1892. At that time, French police informants had already noted acid marks on his hands several times, suggesting that he was preparing explosive material. In reality, according to Bouhey, the idea that Henry was gradually radicalized during this period overlooks two key elements: the fact that he had planned his first attack long in advance and that he was assisted by other anarchists in carrying it out.

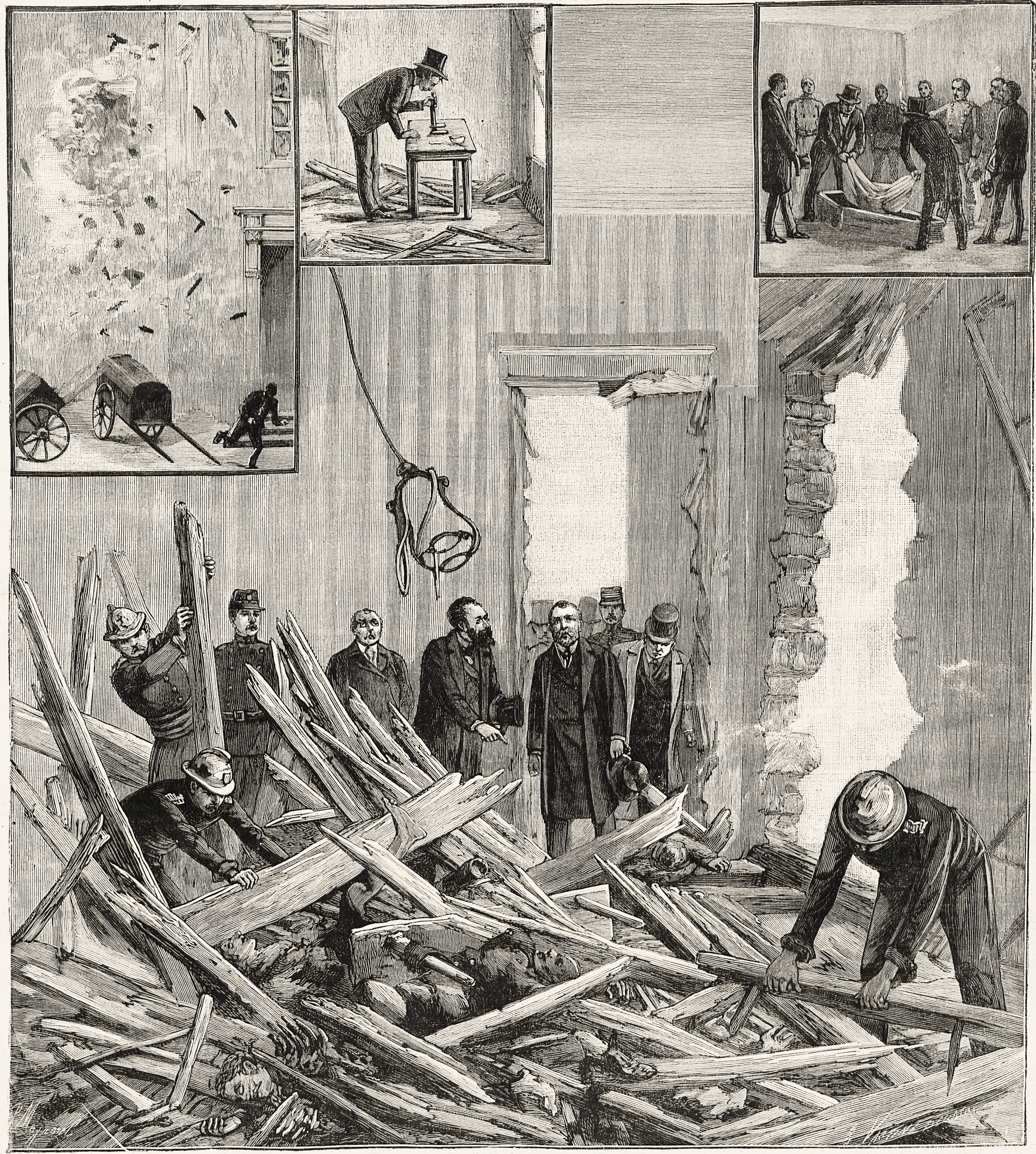
Representation of the Carmaux-Bons Enfants bombing in Le Progrès Illustré

In August 1892, the Carmaux strike began. This strike was triggered by the abrupt dismissal of Jean-Baptiste Calvignac, a socialist and trade unionist working in the Carmaux mine, following his election as mayor of Carmaux. What started as a small, local movement quickly spread and gained national attention, particularly from prominent socialists such as Jean Jaurès. These figures persuaded the workers to negotiate and initially accept a return to work. Henry closely followed the strike and viewed the actions of the socialists and Jaurès as a betrayal that ultimately served only to benefit the bourgeoisie. The fact that the workers resumed work even poorer than when they had left reinforced his belief that they should have directly attacked the means of production, destroyed them, and thereby forced the bourgeoisie to negotiate.

He began manufacturing explosives to target the headquarters of the Carmaux Mining Company, whose address he found in the directory. For this attack, he was likely assisted by his brother and the anarchist activist Adrienne Chailliey, a close associate of Henry who had already given him shelter several times. After assembling the bomb, he took advantage of a moment when his employer sent him on an errand in Paris to place it at the company’s headquarters. However, the building's concierge noticed the suspicious package and alerted the police. Officers arrived, retrieved the package, and, accompanied by a company employee, brought it to the police station on Rue des Bons-Enfants. There, the bomb exploded as the officers opened it, killing four policemen and the employee. The Carmaux-Bons Enfants bombing was the deadliest incident of the Ère des attentats.

==== Exile and illegalism ====
This attack caused shock both among the police and the anarchists. The police were caught off guard, as they had been preparing for unrest and attacks in Carmaux itself, not suspecting that the target would instead be the company's headquarters in Paris. Anarchists were also surprised by the attack. Kropotkin, Malatesta, and Malato, who were in London at the time, knew nothing about the attacker’s identity or the plan, which seemed to be unknown to most anarchist circles. Meanwhile, Henry feigned illness with his employer, Dupuy, writing to him that he needed to spend a few days in Brévannes. In reality, he quickly fled the country, going to the United Kingdom. He was placed on a list of 180 suspects compiled by the police, which also included Malatesta and his brother. However, when the police raided his room, they found nothing to incriminate him. Furthermore, Dupuy, when questioned, stated that it was impossible for Henry to have carried out the attack during the errands he had assigned him. French authorities, additionally receiving testimonies suggesting that a woman had planted the bomb - maybe Chailliey -, abandoned his trail for a time.

Having fled France and living in hiding, his trajectory is difficult to trace. However, while settled in London, he appears to have had connections with certain members gravitating around the illegalist group of the Ortiz gang, such as Luigi Parmeggiani, Alessandro Marroco, and Placide Schouppe, among others, while also maintaining ties with Malato. During this period, he participated in armed robberies in France with this group and Léon Ortiz, though it is difficult to determine when and where exactly. He notably carried out a robbery with Ortiz in December 1892 in Fiquefleur-Équainville, where they stole 800,000 francs from a property owner.

In April 1893, he was in Brussels and joined the general strike of 1893 in Belgium, declared in response to the refusal by Belgian parliamentarians to grant universal male suffrage. The Belgian army intervened and fired on the protesters, and Henry participated in the fighting by shooting at the police—without being arrested, which surprised him. He hoped for a revolution, but an agreement was signed by the socialists, who accepted a compromise and a property-based suffrage—which gave more votes to people who owned land. Henry saw this as another betrayal by the socialists.

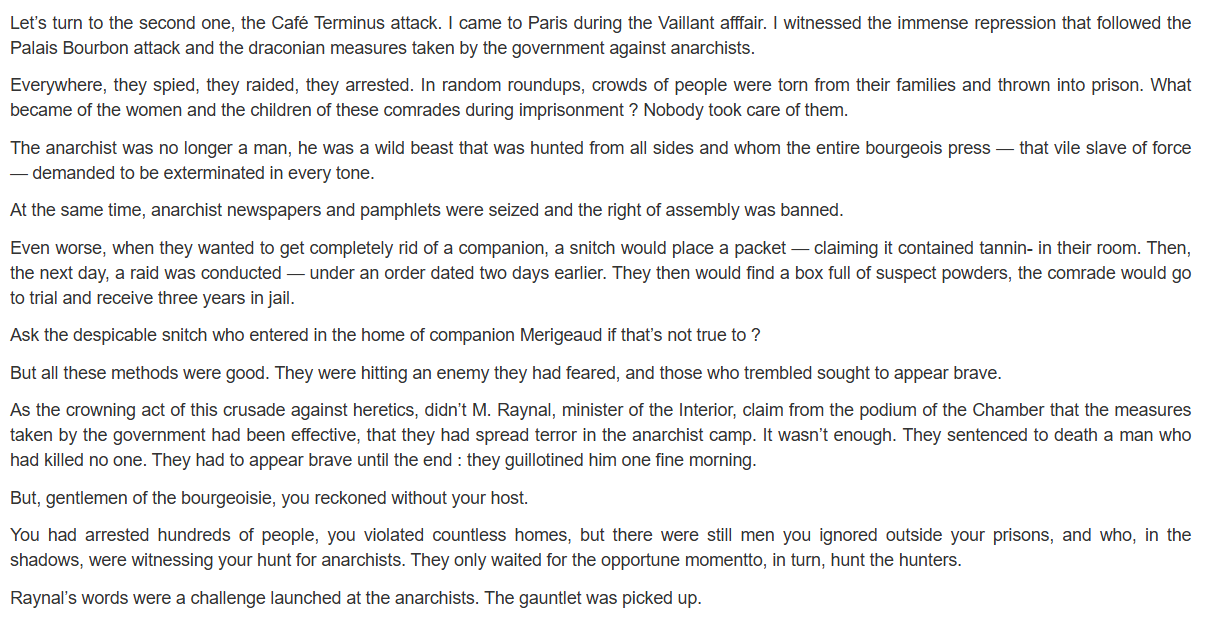
Excerpt of Henry's declaration at his trial, speaking about the repression of January and February 1894

During the year 1893, the anarchist continued this life and traveled several times to Paris, staying there for up to a month at a time without being arrested. However, little by little, the police began to suspect him of the attack—especially since he was untraceable, and information gradually reached them suggesting that he might be the perpetrator of the assault. Meanwhile, the French police, in collaboration with other European police forces, launched large-scale repressive operations against anarchists, with hundreds being searched, arrested, or placed in temporary detention in France and Spain, and thousands sent to penal camps in Italy. Anarchist attacks also continued, including the actions of Pauli Pallas and, notably, Santiago Salvador with the Liceu bombing (7 November 1893) in Spain. In France, two attacks marked the end of 1893: the 13 November 1893 stabbing by Léon Léauthier and the National Assembly bombing by Auguste Vaillant (9 December 1893).

After Vaillant's attack, which was considered very positively by all anarchists because he targeted political representatives intimately linked with the State, the political authorities took advantage of the situation to pass the first two lois scélérates ('vilainous laws'), a series of laws targeting the anarchist movement and curbing individual freedoms. Being an anarchist then became a crime in itself in France.

==== Terminus bombing ====
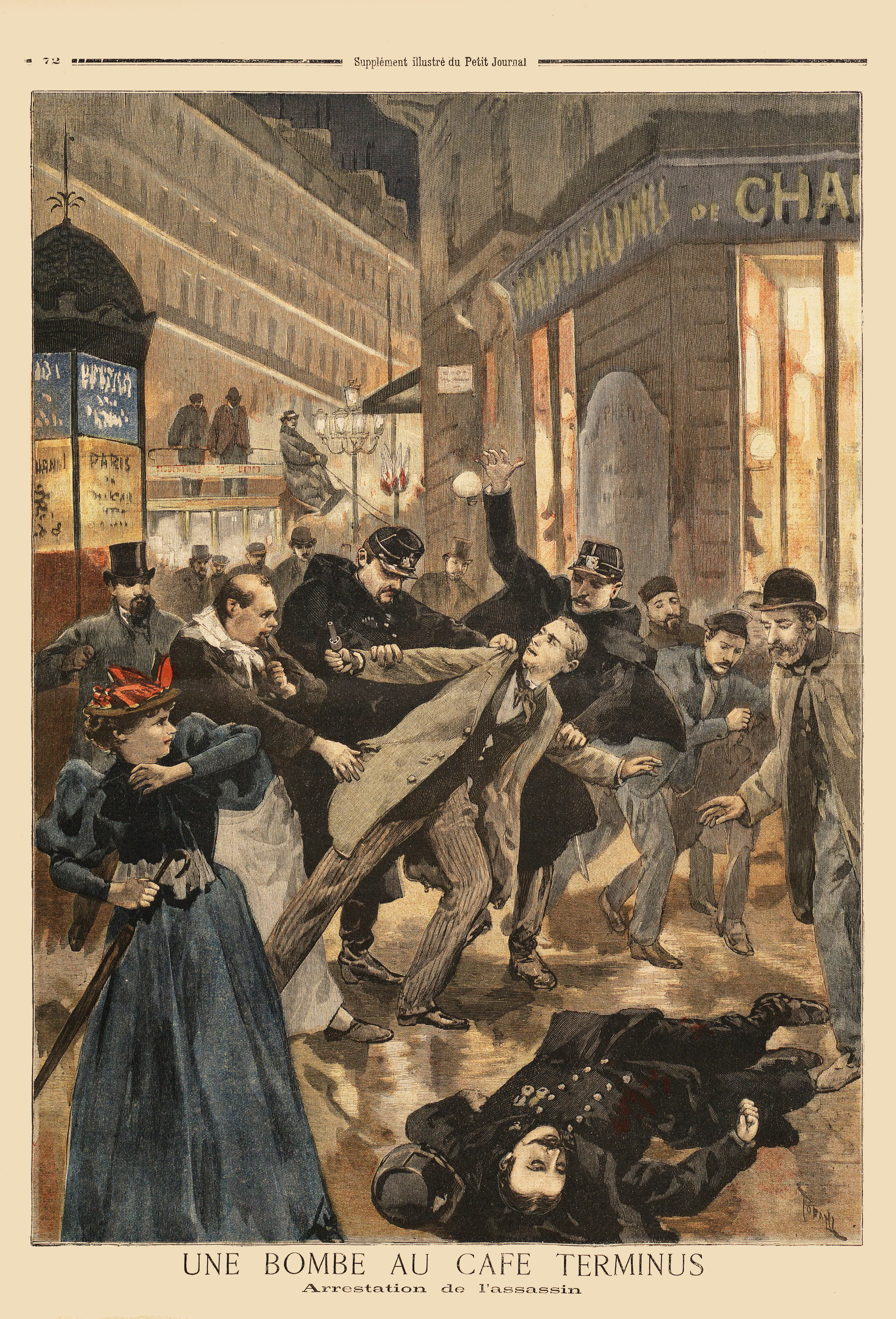
Henry's capture

Vaillant, in the meantime, was quickly put on trial, sentenced to death, and executed on 5 February 1894. His execution provoked an explosion of anger among anarchist circles in France, who saw him as a martyr undeserving of the death penalty—since he had killed no one. Henry was in Paris, and the police were increasingly searching for him, gradually becoming convinced that he was the perpetrator of the attack on Rue des Bons-Enfants.

Seven days later, on February 12, 1894, Henry decided to act. He was due to meet his friend, Louis Matha, the following day, and it's highly probable that Matha would have dissuaded him. This likely pushed Henry to want to commit his attack before he could change his mind.

Henry then made his way to the Élysée Palace, the residence of the French President. His intention was to assassinate Sadi Carnot, who had refused to pardon Vaillant and had persecuted anarchists. This made Carnot a prime target for anarchists, and Henry likely believed such an act would gain him prestige among them, particularly with Gauthey. Armed with a bomb strapped to his belt, a dagger with a poisoned blade, a loaded revolver, and brass knuckles, the anarchist found himself facing a strong police presence around the palace, making an attack unlikely—especially as he did not seem well-prepared. He therefore decided to change his plans, and what was initially conceived as a targeted assassination evolved into something else.

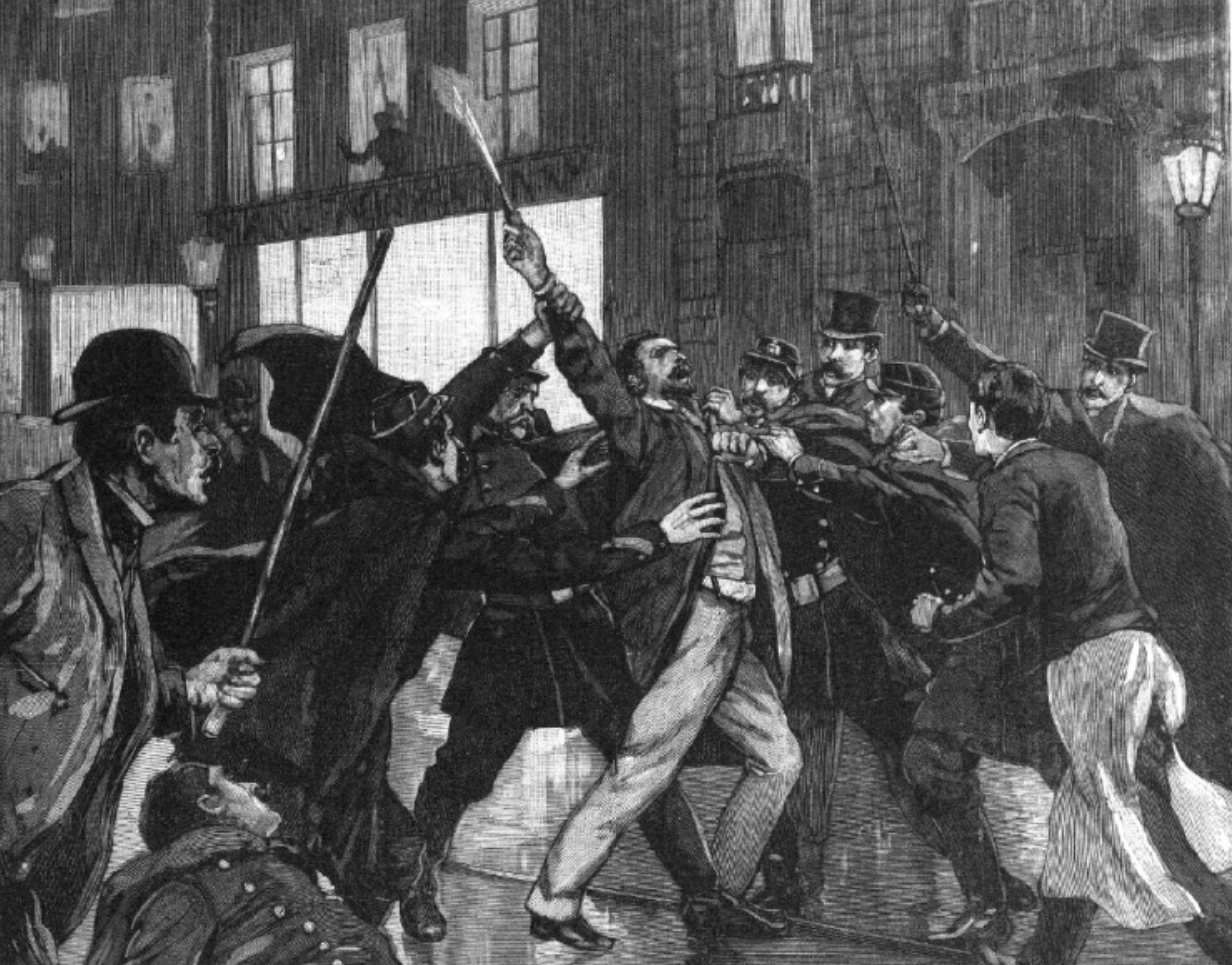
Depiction of Émile Henry's arrest in Le Petit Parisien : supplément illustré (25 February 1894)

He decided to leave the area and moved toward the Paris Opera, wanting to detonate his bomb there, without managing to enter, and then towards the Gare Saint-Lazare. There, Henry entered the Café Terminus, located near the station and frequented by many tourists and travelers. As he walked in, a Romani orchestra was playing on the café's stage. Henry sat down and observed the scene. Then, after ordering two beers and a cigar, around 9 p.m., he used the cigar to light the fuse of his bomb. He stood up and threw the bomb toward the stage where the orchestra was performing—before fleeing into the street. The bomb exploded in the middle of the café, injuring about twenty people, some severely—one of whom died.

He then ran into the street, intending to take a train from Gare Saint-Lazare to the Parisian suburbs and disappear. However, he was pursued by a café employee, who shouted at him to stop and tried to prevent his escape. The chase was soon joined by a nearby policeman, who threw himself at Henry. Henry shot him in the chest, and when the wounded officer drew his saber to attack, Henry emptied his revolver into him, gravely injuring him. However, more police officers rushed to the scene and tackled Henry, engaging in a struggle until they finally subdued and arrested him.

=== Trial ===
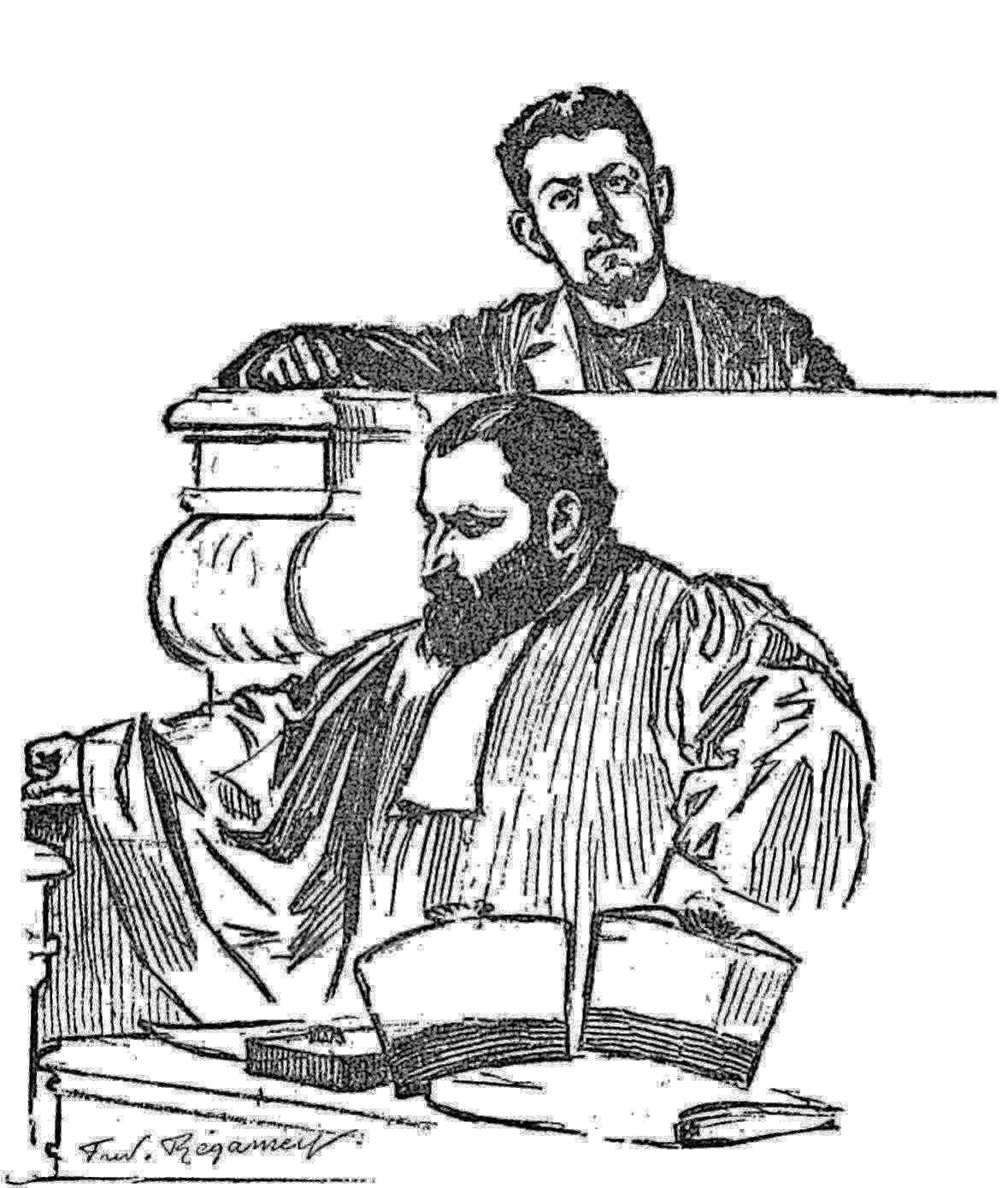
Depiction of Henry and his lawyer Nicolas Hornbostel in Le Matin (29 April 1894)

After his arrest, Henry was transferred to the Conciergerie, placed in the same cell that Ravachol had occupied before his trial, which greatly pleased him. His mother, visited by the police, insisted that it was impossible for her son to have committed the attack. Gauthey was also arrested in case she needed to testify, as the police had found a lock of her hair on Henry at the time of his arrest.

Henry’s attack took both anarchists and French society as a whole by surprise. The completely indiscriminate nature of the bombing was particularly shocking. In anarchist circles, such an indiscriminate attack was met with considerable distance. Most anarchists rejected this act, as it did not target a specific figure of power or the bourgeoisie. Le Révolté, led by Jean Grave, immediately denounced Henry, writing:

Let this be clearly understood: every time an explosion does not target authority, wealth, or capitalist exploitation, one can safely attribute it to those who have an interest in discrediting us. We know exactly what kind of scoundrels we are talking about.

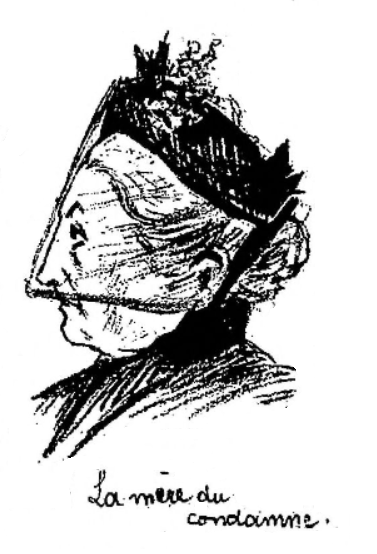
Depiction of Rose Caubet, his mother, during the trial of Henry

While most anarchists rejected his actions, some—particularly within the individualist anarchist tendency—considered them legitimate. In certain individualist defenses of Henry, the idea of propaganda by the deed was secondary; he acted simply because his 'disgust had reached its maximum intensity'.

In any case, this innovative aspect of terrorism continued during his trial, which began on 27 April 1894. Unlike Vaillant or Ravachol, who both presented themselves as avengers during their respective trials, Henry portrayed himself as a fighter in a war to the death. To him, society was engaged in a total war between the bourgeoisie and the rest of the population, with only two kinds of people: those who resist, those who oppress, and those who fail to realize they are complicit. Thus, he saw the majority of French society as a legitimate target. He made no attempt to downplay his actions—on the contrary, he fully assumed them and even lamented that he had not killed more people. According to Bouhey and Badier, this stance may have been an attempt to obscure the possible involvement of his brother and Chailliey in the Carmaux-Bons-Enfants bombing.

Henry also fully embraced the mass nature of his terrorism, making him the first to theorize this new form of violence. He said that he wanted to 'strike at random' or that:

The bourgeoisie has made all anarchists into a single bloc. […] Well! Since you hold an entire movement responsible for the acts of one man and strike as a bloc, we too will strike as a bloc.

Whereas Ravachol accepted a certain degree of legitimacy in the judicial process, Henry outright rejected it. The prospect of execution did not trouble him in the slightest. In doing so, he pioneered the strategy of total rupture in the courtroom. After being sentenced to death, he declared:

I do not recognize bourgeois justice and will not ask anything of them—neither favor nor mercy. I will not file an appeal, nor seek clemency, and the only thing I desire is to be handed over as quickly as possible to the executioner of the bourgeoisie.

=== Execution ===
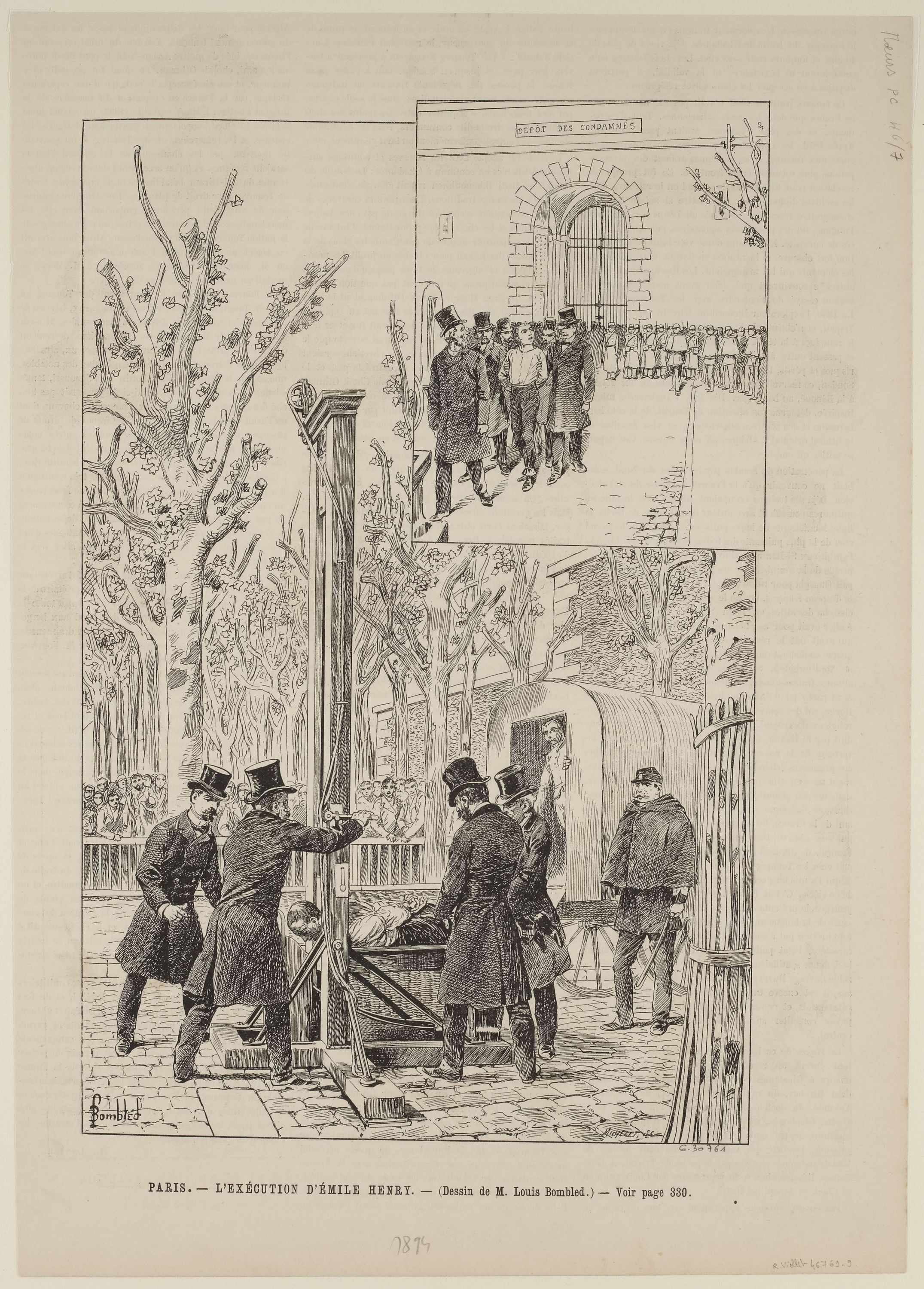
Depiction of his execution in Le Progrès Illustré (3 June 1894)

Two days before his execution, on 19 May 1894, Célestin Nat stabbed a bourgeois in Marseille as an act of vengeance for Henry being sentenced to death.

On the evening of 20 May 1894, Henry went to bed at 9 p.m. His execution was scheduled for the night at place de la Roquette, guarded by five hundred policemen. Access was restricted to notable figures of the capital, including Georges Clemenceau and Maurice Barrès, who attended the event.

Around 3:15 a.m., executioner Louis Deibler and his assistant set up the guillotine. Deibler had met with Henry the previous day to discuss the details of the execution, and their conversation had reportedly gone smoothly. At approximately 4:00 a.m., the gate of the adjacent prison opened, and Henry stepped out onto the square. His wrists and ankles were bound, making his walk difficult. He advanced toward the scaffold with a resolute stride but paled as he neared the end of his path. He stopped and declared:

Courage, comrades! Long live anarchy!

He repeated the second part of his exclamation before the executioners seized him and placed him into the execution device. He was guillotined shortly thereafter, his head falling into the basket in front of the guillotine. His death certificate recorded the approximate time of death as 4:10 a.m.

== Legacy ==
=== Immediate aftermath ===
After his death, Henry was buried in Brévannes. His mother was devastated, while Élisa Gauthey seemed quite pleased to be interviewed by newspapers about Henry. She spoke extensively to journalists, even expressing regret over not having accepted his advances at the time, and shared numerous intimate details about their relationship.

Sadi Carnot, who had refused to pardon Ravachol, Vaillant, and Henry, was assassinated a few months later by Sante Geronimo Caserio, who stabbed him to death.

=== Anarchist circles and thought ===
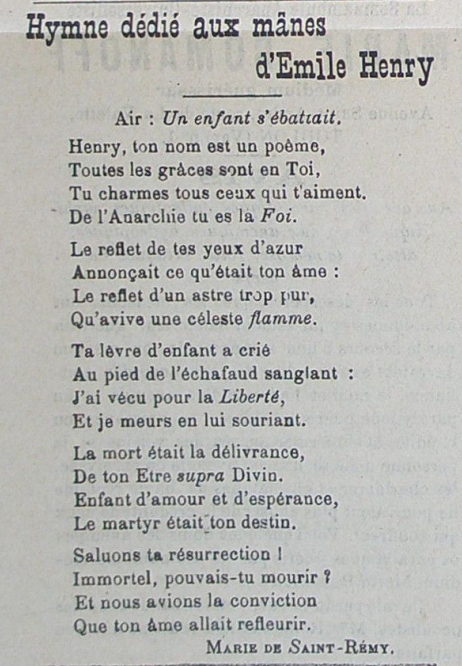
Poem by Marie de Saint-Rémy to Émile Henry in Le Christ anarchiste (N°05)

Among anarchists, reactions to Henry’s execution and the legacy of his attacks were significant. The Café Terminus bombing, due to its extreme violence and indiscriminate nature, was one of the key events signaling the end of the Ère des attentats. In reality, after this attack, anarchist attacks slowed down until they eventually stopped. Anarchists increasingly recognized the weakness of terrorist strategy, as it led to harsher state repression without necessarily gaining popular support—something that became particularly evident with the indiscriminate nature of the Terminus bombing. In France, anarchist circles gradually abandoned propaganda of the deed, shifting their focus toward other forms of struggle, particularly the emerging anarcho-syndicalist movement.

At the same time, Henry became a central figure for the emerging individualist anarchist tendency. Though a minority within anarchism, these militants adopted him as a symbol, a process that had already begun during his lifetime with attacks like those of Désiré Pauwels on the 20 February bombings, and the Madeleine bombing. In this sense, Henry’s life played a key role in shaping individualist anarchism—an 'anarchy within anarchy'.

=== Birth of mass and modern terrorism ===
Ferragu places Henry alongside Léon Léauthier and Santiago Salvador as one of the early founders of modern terrorism. However, since Léauthier refrained from theorizing this form of terrorism during his trial to avoid the death penalty, and Salvador’s trial took place later in the year, Henry was, in fact, the first to fully articulate this ideology. This characterization is supported by Merriman and Badier from different perspectives but is criticized by Salomé, who argues that Henry’s attack still targeted a specific bourgeois enemy rather than society as a whole. For Petit, such a shift in Henry's plans isn't connected to anarchism but rather to the romantic motivations driving him. This, Petit argues, is evident in the unprepared and erratic nature of Henry's actions.

While this form of indiscriminate terrorism had little impact on later anarchist terrorism, which either faded away or returned to more traditional forms of tyrannicide, it was quickly adopted by various terrorist groups well into the 21st century. Merriman highlights Henry’s intellectual shift, in which he came to see society as a whole as guilty and thus a legitimate target, as an idea that later resurfaced in very different forms of terrorism, including Islamist terrorism in the early 21st century. However, he warns that such comparisons must be made with great caution, as the respective ideologies are vastly different. Still, this notion of a guilty and indiscriminately targeted society is a common thread between Henry and these later movements.

Ferragu describes this massification of terrorism as follows:

By striking 'into the crowd', Émile Henry redefined the framework of the attack, ultimately moving beyond the old model of tyrannicide in favor of a modern form of terrorism—one that blindly targets a society defined both as an enemy and as an objective adversary (the 'bourgeoisie').

== Works ==
=== Speech ===
- Declaration of Émile Henry at his trial, 1894 (in French original here) (courtesy of Archives anarchistes)

=== Articles ===
- Patrie ! in Le Forçat, 4 July 1891, criticism of the idea of homeland and patriotism
- "Regarding the recent article by Enrico Malatesta", l'Endehors, Paris, 29 August 1892, criticism of Malatesta's 'A Little Theory' article and more broadly a defence of individualist anarchism against anarchist communism

== Bibliography ==
- Badier, Walter (2010), "Émile Henry, le « Saint-Just de l'Anarchie »" [Émile Henry, the 'Saint-Just of Anarchy'], Parlement[s] (in French), vol. 14, no. 2, Paris: Revue d'histoire politique, pp. 159–171, doi:10.3917/parl.014.0159
- Bouhey, Vivien (2009), Les Anarchistes contre la République [The Anarchists against the Republic] (in French), Rennes: Presses universitaires de Rennes (PUR)
- Chambost, Anne-Sophie (2017), "« Nous ferons de notre pire… ». Anarchie, illégalisme … et lois scélérates" [«We’ll Do our Worse». Anarchy, Illegalism … and Evil Law], Droit et Cultures (in French), 74 (2): 65–87, doi:10.4000/droitcultures.4264
- Ferragu, Gilles (2019), "L'écho des bombes : l'invention du terrorisme « à l'aveugle » (1893-1895)" [The echo of bombs: The invention of indiscriminate terrorism (1893–1895)], Ethnologie française (in French), 49 (1): 21–31, doi:10.3917/ethn.191.0021
- Merriman, John M. (2016). The dynamite club: how a bombing in fin-de-siècle Paris ignited the age of modern terror. Yale University Press. ISBN 978-0-300-21792-6.
- Merriman, John M. (2018), "The Spectre of the Commune and French Anarchism in the 1890s", The Palgrave Handbook of Anarchism, Palgrave Macmillan Cham, pp. 343–352, doi:10.1007/978-3-319-75620-2_20, ISBN 978-3-319-75619-6
- Petit, Dominique (2023), Fortuné Henry et la colonie libertaire d'Aiglemont : de la propagande pour Ravachol au syndicalisme révolutionnaire [Fortuné Henry and the Aiglemont Libertarian Colony: From Propaganda for Ravachol to Revolutionary Syndicalism], Paris: Terres Ardennaises / Noir et Rouge
- Salomé, Karine (2011), L'Ouragan homicide : L'attentat politique en France au XIXe siècle [The homicidal Hurricane: political assassination in 19th century France] (in French), Paris: Champ Vallon / Epoque, ISBN 978-2-87673-538-5
