= Café Terminus attack =

1894 anarchist bombing in France

- Part of Ère des attentats
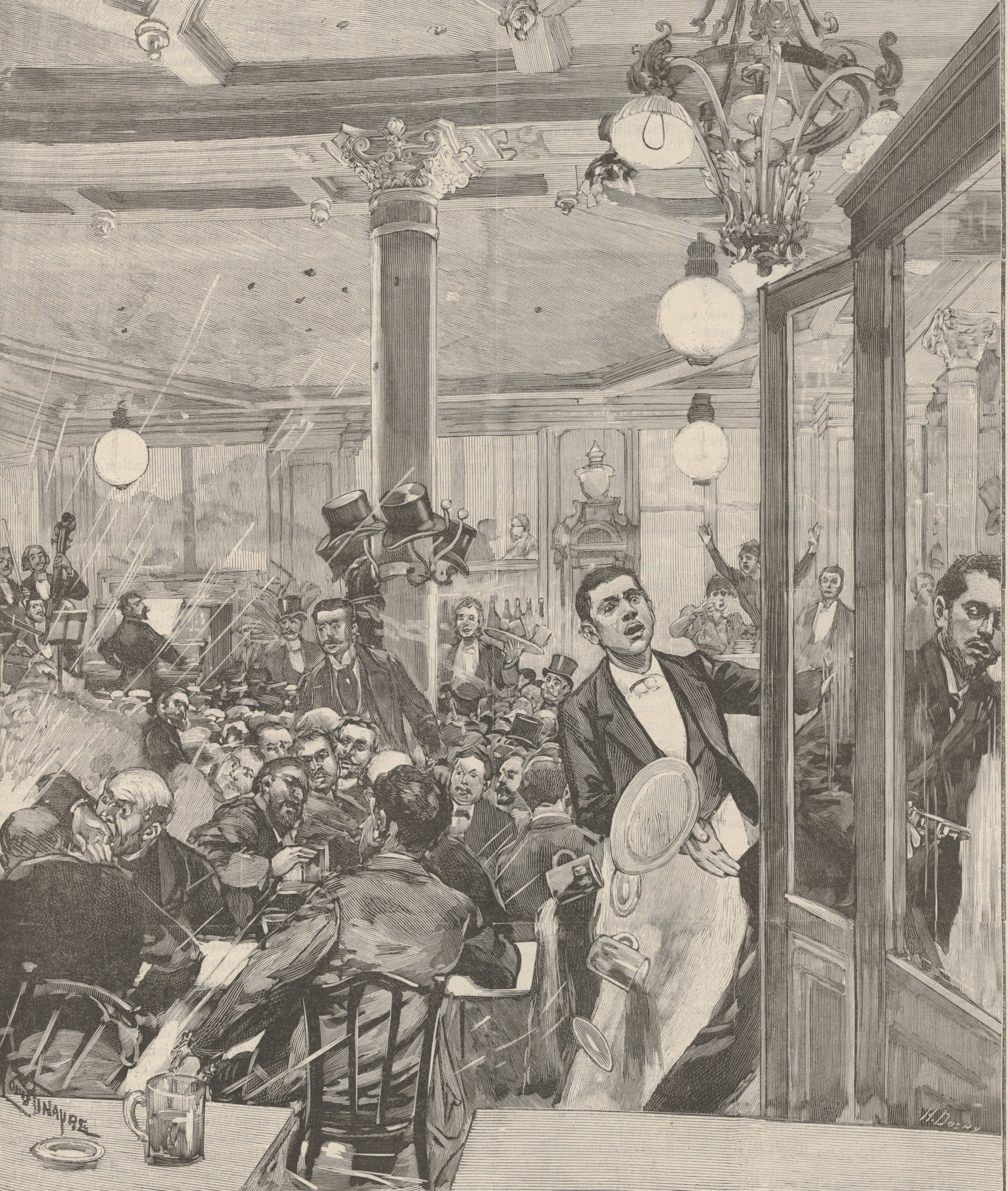
- Depicition of the attack in the front page of Le Monde illustré (17 February 1894)
- Location: 48°52′32″N 2°19′32″E; Café Terminus
- Date: 12 February 1894
- Attack type: bombing
- Deaths: 1
- Injuries: 17
- Perpetrators: Émile Henry; Léon Ortiz; Paolo Chiericotti; Louis Matha
- Motive: Anarchism (debated); Desire to impress his love interest (debated)
- Accused: 1
- Verdict: Guilty (death)
- Convicted: 1

On 12 February 1894, anarchist Émile Henry carried out a bomb attack against the people gathered in the Café Terminus in Paris, France. Undertaken during the period known as the Ère des attentats (1892–1894), it was one of the first acts of modern and mass terrorism in history and is also known for Henry's statement at his trial, which is considered a foundational element of this form of terrorism.

Following the passing of the lois scélérates ('villainous laws'), the repression of January and February 1894, and the executions of Ravachol and Auguste Vaillant without a pardon from French President Sadi Carnot, the latter became a symbolic enemy of the entire anarchist movement. The anarchists viewed Carnot as primarily responsible for the persecutions they faced. In early 1894, while the repression was ongoing, Émile Henry was in Paris and witnessed it. He was possibly joined by a number of illegalists from the Ortiz gang, such as Léon Ortiz or Paolo Chiericotti. While the involvement of these people is not certain, Henry crafted a bomb with which he intended to target Carnot.

On 12 February 1894, Henry attempted to go to the Élysée Palace, the residence of the French President, but could not get close. He then tried to "fall back" on the Opéra and the Hôtel de Ville, where Parisian aristocratic balls were underway, but he was unsuccessful in gaining entry. Determined to commit an attack, likely to impress the anarchist he loved, Élisa Gauthey, he assessed several Parisian restaurants before targeting the Café Terminus, where he threw his bomb around nine in the evening. Fleeing, he was quickly arrested, tried, and guillotined. Carnot was assassinated by Italian anarchist Sante Geronimo Caserio a few months later.

At his trial, Henry claimed to have premeditated and theorized this form of terrorism, making him frequently considered one of the founders of modern terrorism. According to his argument, he "struck indiscriminately, without choosing [his] victims" to retaliate against the state's similar actions toward anarchists. However, recent historians temper this view. They point out that his erratic and poorly planned movements make the idea of him premeditating mass terrorism unlikely, especially since he initially targeted Carnot and then aristocratic balls. These historians suggest that his desire to impress Gauthey was more likely the catalyst for this act of mass terrorism, rather than a well-thought-out premeditation rooted in anarchist ideology. He also amplified the violence of his statements to help his companions avoid legal prosecution.

While this specific form of mass terrorism was not replicated in subsequent anarchist propaganda of the deed actions—which generally pursued more traditional forms of tyrannicide (the assassination of specific rulers, leaders, or their delegates)—it has held a central place in modern terrorism, at least until the early part of the 21st century.

== Background ==
In the 19th century, anarchism emerged and developed in Europe before spreading globally. Anarchists advocate for the struggle against all perceived forms of unjust domination, including economic domination arising from the development of industrial capitalism. They are particularly opposed to the State, viewing it as the institution that sanctions many of these dominations through its police, army, and propaganda.

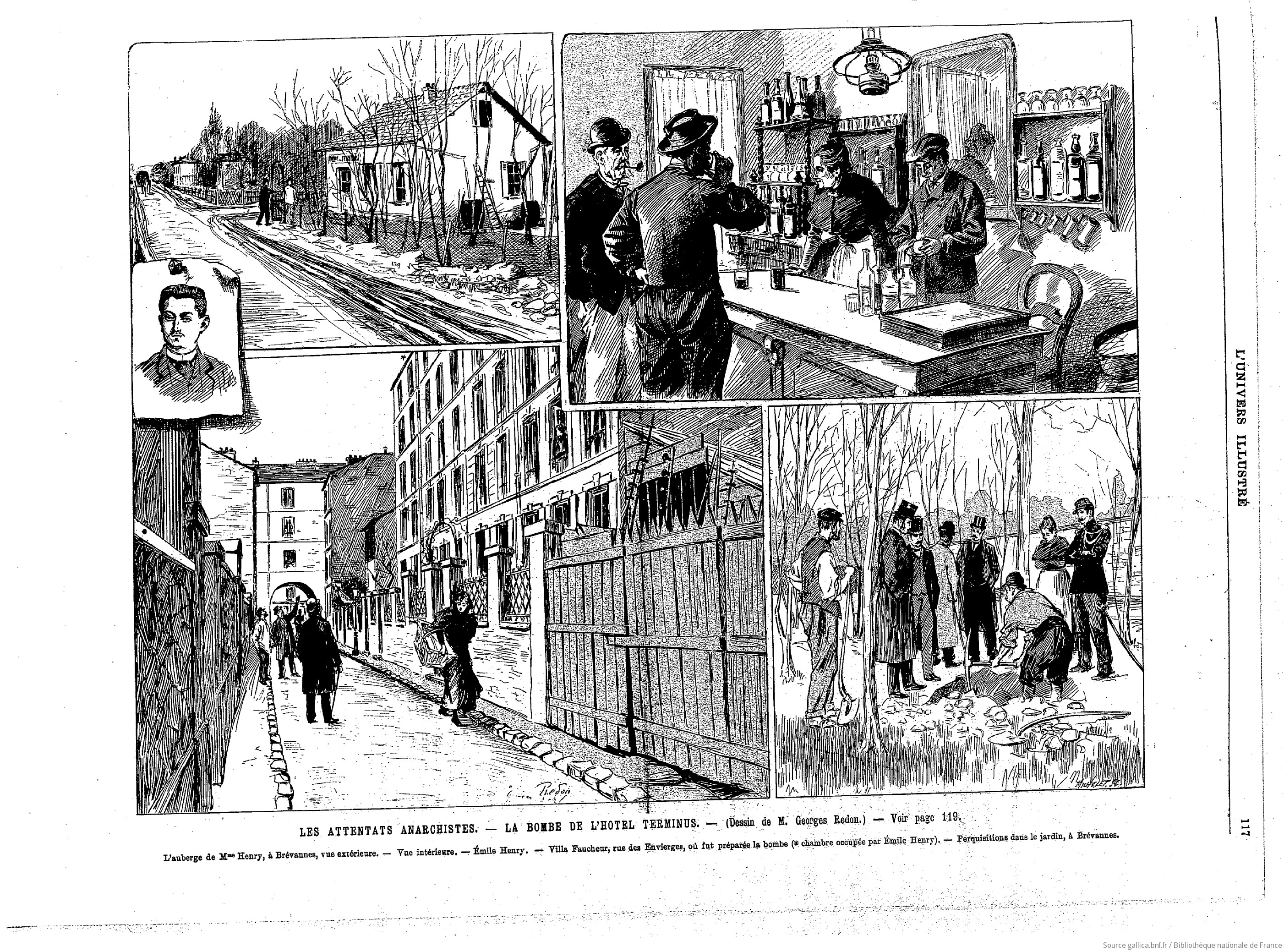
The business run by the Henry brothers' mother, Rose Caubet, in L'Univers illustré (24 February 1894)

In 1891–1892, after the Clichy affair—where police officers shot at and beat peacefully demonstrating anarchists, with the justice system acquitting the police and handing down heavy prison sentences to the victims—this unjust situation triggered what public opinion dubbed the Ère des attentats (1892–1894). During this period, anarchists like Ravachol sought revenge for the repression targeting them by attacking those presumed responsible. Ravachol was sentenced to death and executed after carrying out two bomb attacks targeting the magistrates responsible for the Clichy affair victims' trial. His conviction and execution deeply impacted anarchists, who came to see him as a martyr.

Émile Henry, a young man who embraced anarchism under the influence of his brother, Fortuné Henry, and already deeply involved in the movement, closely followed these events. Not long before, he had experienced a romantic setback while courting the anarchist militant Élisa Gauthey, who was already married; she rebuffed him but gave him a lock of her hair. They exchanged letters and developed a platonic relationship. However, one day, while Henry was in her presence and that of her husband, she kissed her husband in front of him, causing Henry to faint. When she came to wake him at his bedside, he declared his love, to which she responded with a laugh. Following this, he declared:

Yes, you treat me like a child. But you will know later how much I am attached to you.

The two Henry brothers therefore closely observed the beginning of the Ère des attentats. They attempted to go to Montbrison, where Ravachol was to be guillotined, to try and save him by force. However, this action never materialized, possibly due to significant police protection around Ravachol. During the summer of 1892, they also witnessed the beginning of the Carmaux strike and the intervention of socialists who broke the strike, leading to workers returning to work poorer than before. Henry, very likely aided by other militants, made a bomb to target the company's headquarters. It was brought to the location, possibly by Adrienne Chailliey, and, according to police reports from the period, was placed to target the company director. The bomb, which exploded at the police station on Rue des Bons-Enfants, caused several police deaths.

Henry fled; his brother was arrested the same day for other reasons, and he learned of this arrest later. In refuge in London and Belgium, Henry associated with a number of individuals, including Léon Ortiz, Placide Schouppe, Louis Matha, Paolo Chiericotti, Alessandro Marocco, among others. With the illegalists of the Ortiz gang, he participated in burglaries in Northern France.

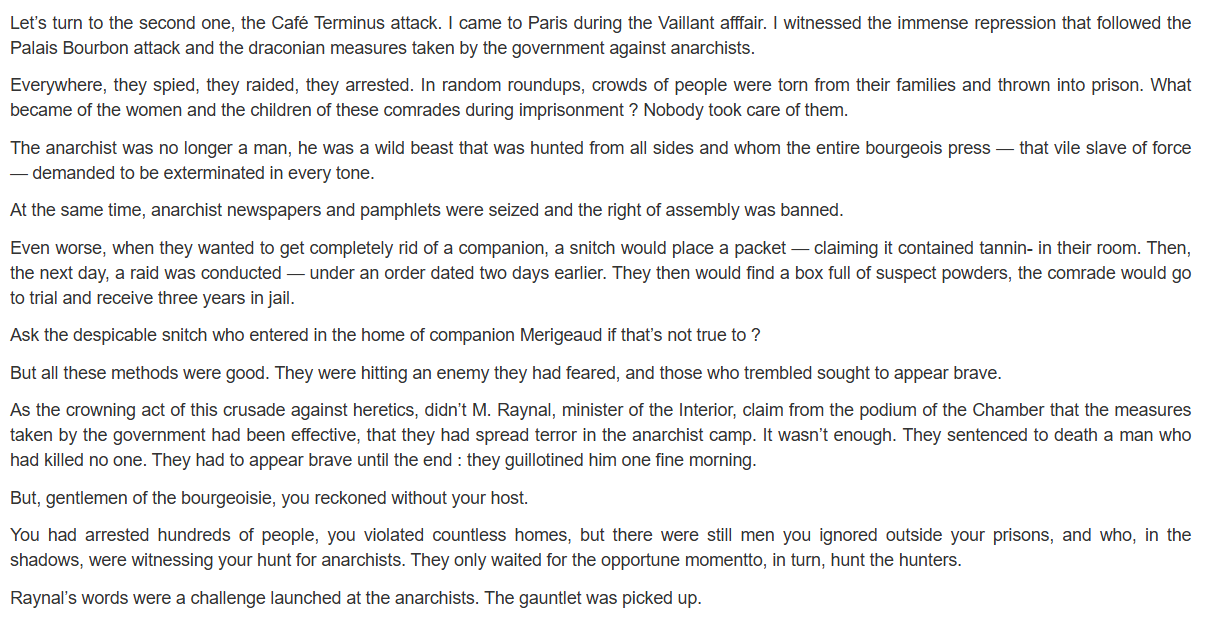
Excerpt of Henry's declaration at his trial, speaking about the repression of January and February 1894

In December 1893, Auguste Vaillant carried out the attack on the National Assembly, targeting the center of French political power with a bomb not intended to kill, but designed to cause a large explosion that would force deputies to take concrete action to reduce povertys. Vaillant also claimed to have carried out this attack against French imperialism. He slightly injured a number of people but killed no one and, once arrested, was subjected to a summary trial. His arrest and the attack were used as pretexts by the French authorities to pass the first two lois scélérates ('vilainous laws')—laws targeting the anarchist movement in France and significantly reducing individual and political freedoms under the guise of fighting terrorism. Armed with these new powers, the French government proceeded with a very significant repression targeting anarchists starting in January 1894.

== Preparations ==
Meanwhile, as many anarchists were arrested without trial and raids followed one another, Henry returned to Paris. The main person responsible for the repression, French President Sadi Carnot, gradually became a prime target for anarchists. His refusal to pardon Vaillant, even though he had killed no one and his only daughter, Sidonie Vaillant, was left in destitution, caused widespread resentment among anarchists and a significant portion of Paris's working-class population.

The people gravitating around the Ortiz gang, including Henry, who had returned, gradually settled in Paris after their exile. The majority were back in Paris in early 1894, As the repression only targeted anarchists whose addresses and identities the police knew, who were often the least dangerous or radical ones, they managed to avoid being prosecuted through it. On 18 January 1894, the police noticed Henry and that he supposedly had a "room in Ménilmontant transformed into a laboratory", but they failed to find his home. It is plausible that Henry, Ortiz, Chiericotti, and other anarchists from these circles then became involved in making explosives. According to Marocco's testimony, a month later, Henry had planned to settle in Paris to launch the attack—or even a series of attacks.

Furthermore, Louis Matha, a notable anarchist militant of the period and manager of l'Endehors, a close friend of Fortuné and Émile's "mentor" in the anarchist movement, traveled to Paris from London. He seemed aware of Henry's desire to commit the attack and 'pursued him' in anarchist circles in the Parisian region to meet him and very likely dissuade him. He found him on 11 February 1894, and the two talked; Henry told Matha that his friendship bothered him and indicated that he wished to be left alone. However, the two agreed to meet the next day. According to Petit, it is plausible to consider that Matha acted as an emissary for Fortuné Henry—which explains why he tried to prevent Émile Henry from carrying out his attack.

== Café Terminus attack ==
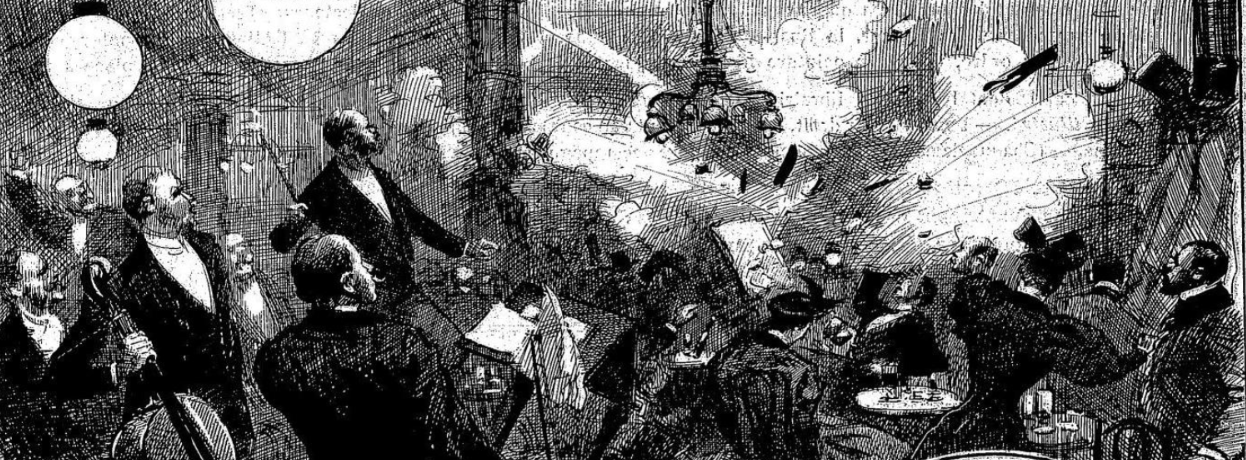
Café Terminus bombing in front page of L'Univers illustré (17 February 1894)

Instead of meeting Matha as planned, Henry remained inactive for a portion of the day. Later, with a bomb in his pocket, he began to make his way toward the Élysée Palace. His intention was to assassinate Sadi Carnot by throwing the bomb at him. However, upon reaching the Élysée, he found the area surrounded by a large security cordon that he could not breach.

Displeased with his failed plan, Henry then moved through Paris, making his way to the Hôtel de Ville. He attempted to enter a ball attended by the Parisian aristocracy and bourgeoisie but was denied entry because he was not "properly dressed" and had no money. Henry left and found himself back on the street. He then continued to the Opéra, where a similar ball was underway, but after realizing all entrances were guarded, he reportedly exclaimed:

Ah, I would have made them dance in there!

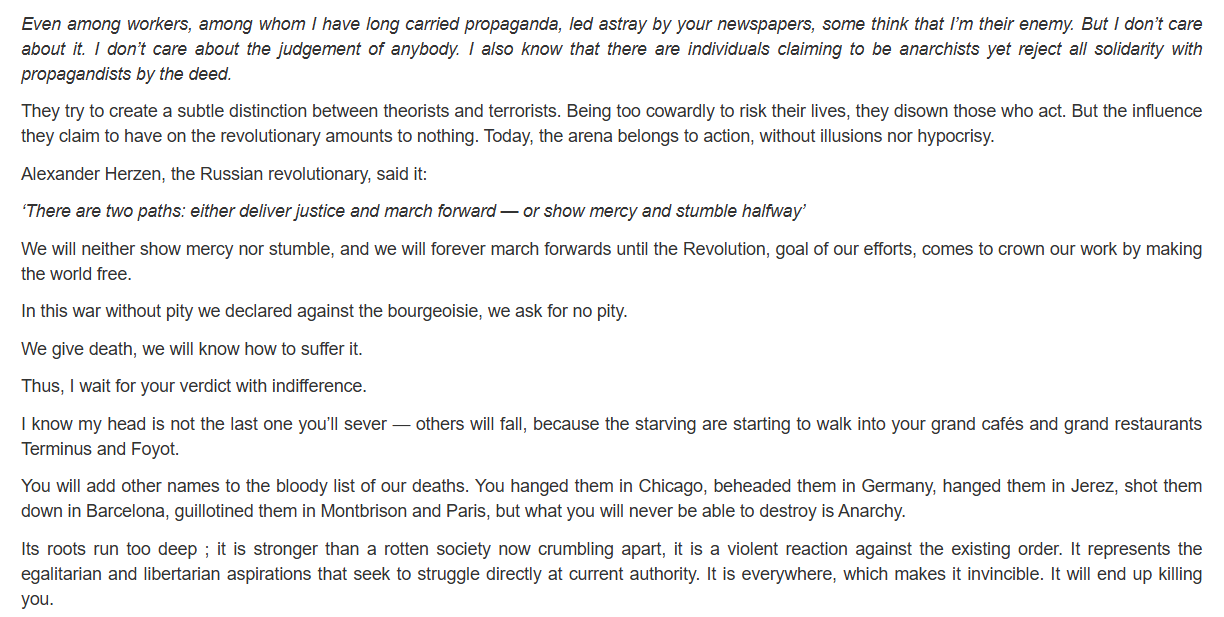
Conclusion of Henry's trial declaration, attacking anarchists and workers who would refuse propaganda by the deed

At this precise moment, Henry's strategy appears to have shifted. As he moved toward the Gare Saint-Lazare, he began to evaluate a number of Parisian restaurants and cafes. He reportedly considered attacking the Bignon restaurant, the Café Américain, or the Café de la Paix, but he did not deem the number of potential victims sufficient. This indicates that from this point forward, he wished to commit a mass attack, no longer necessarily targeting only the bourgeoisie or the president. According to historian Dominique Petit, Its interesting to note that Henry seemed driven by an imperative to commit his attack. It is plausible that if Henry wanted to carry out his attack at all costs, it was partly due to his hesitations, perhaps believing that after meeting Matha, he would no longer have the courage to do so.

Around 8:30 p.m., Henry entered the Café Terminus and settled in. He ordered a cigar and a beer and watched the Romani orchestra playing music in the center of the establishment. Around 9:15, having finished his drinks, he stood up without paying, walked towards the entrance, then turned back and threw his bomb into the middle of the cafe. It hit the chandelier and exploded, injuring a number of people, such as the rentier Pauline Kinsbourg, whose legs were bleeding. The drawer Ernest Borde and his friend Louis-Napoléon Van Herreweghen, who were conversing, were severely hit by the bomb that fell at their feet; Borde collapsed to the ground, gravely wounded, while pieces of lead lodged in Van Herreweghen's leg. In total, the explosion injured 17 people and killed one.

== Arrest ==
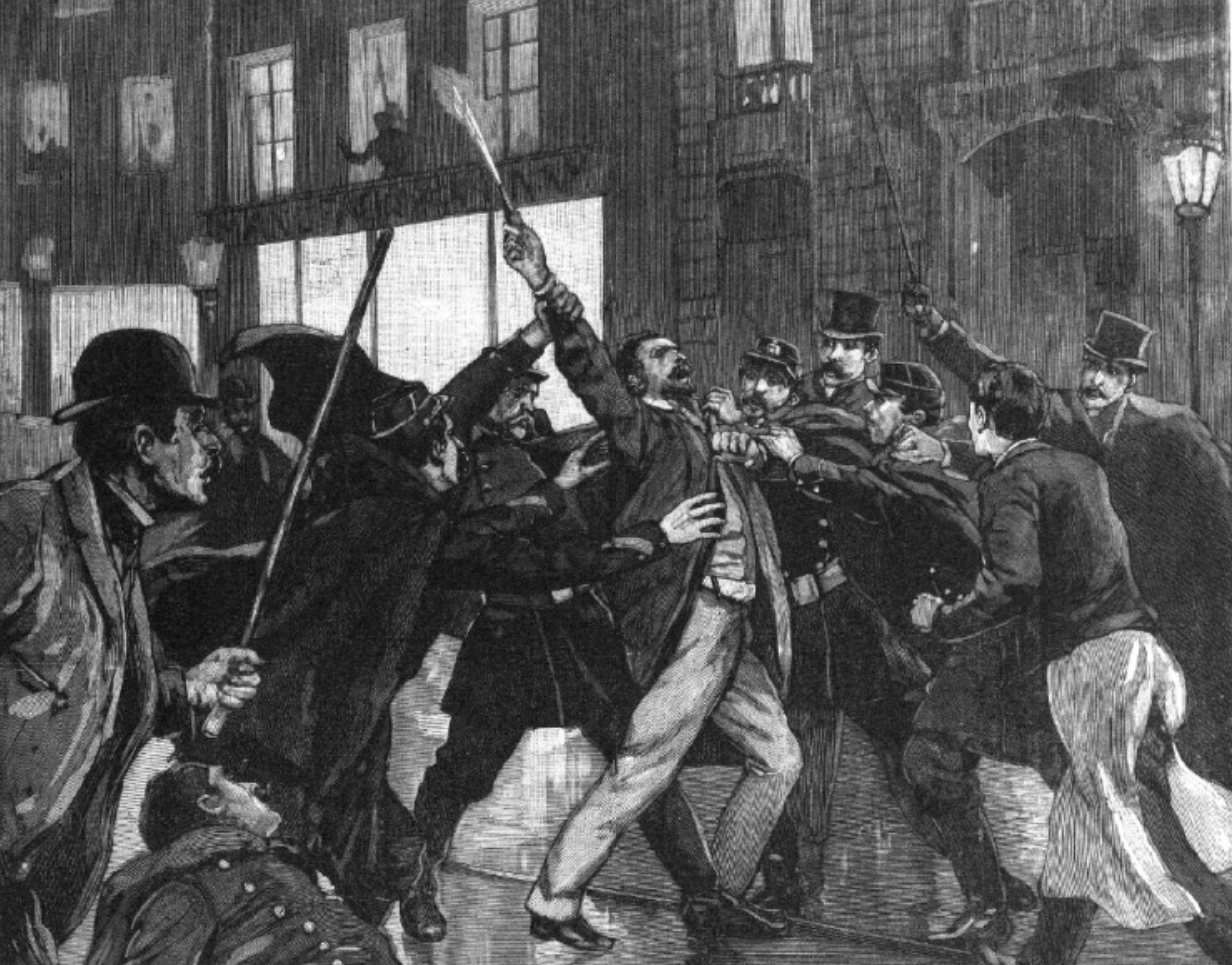
Depiction of Émile Henry's arrest in Le Petit Parisien : supplément illustré (25 February 1894)

Henry fled the Terminus, running into the street. He was pursued by Émile-Joseph Martinguet, an office worker walking down the street who saw the anarchist run. One of the Terminus waiters, named Tissier, also joined the chase, followed by a passing railway worker. Henry then pulled a revolver from his coat and began firing at the waiter. A police officer, François Poisson, who was on guard duty further away, paradoxically discussing Vaillant's execution, started chasing the anarchist, joined by a barber and two ticket inspectors. Meanwhile, Henry fired several shots at his pursuers, not killing them, but wounding the barber in the arm. He was caught by Poisson and two other police officers who rushed to the corner of Rue de l’Isly and Rue de Rome. He shot Poisson again as the officer tried to strike him with his saber, but did not kill him; although he fired at close range, he had flattened his bullets to cause more damage, which reduced their initial velocity, making them less suited for close combat.

The commotion continued, and Henry was struck in the face by a ticket inspector with his puncher. Poisson lunged at him, and the two struggled in the gutter before Henry found the blade of Poisson's saber at his throat. Meanwhile, the police contingent grew stronger, with many new officers rushing in from everywhere. Henry struggled but said nothing, leading a witness to remark that, in this respect, Henry little resembled a typical propagandist by the deed and that he thought he was a thief. After a moment, he cried out, "You pigs, I'll kill you all!"

At the police station, he refused to give his identity. When a doctor treated him for the injuries he sustained in the struggle, Henry declared that his act would be natural for anarchists and that the entire bourgeoisie needed to disappear to bring about an era of human liberty. When the doctor asked if he would kill a bourgeois doctor who was treating him, Henry replied that he would do so without hesitation.

== Aftermath ==
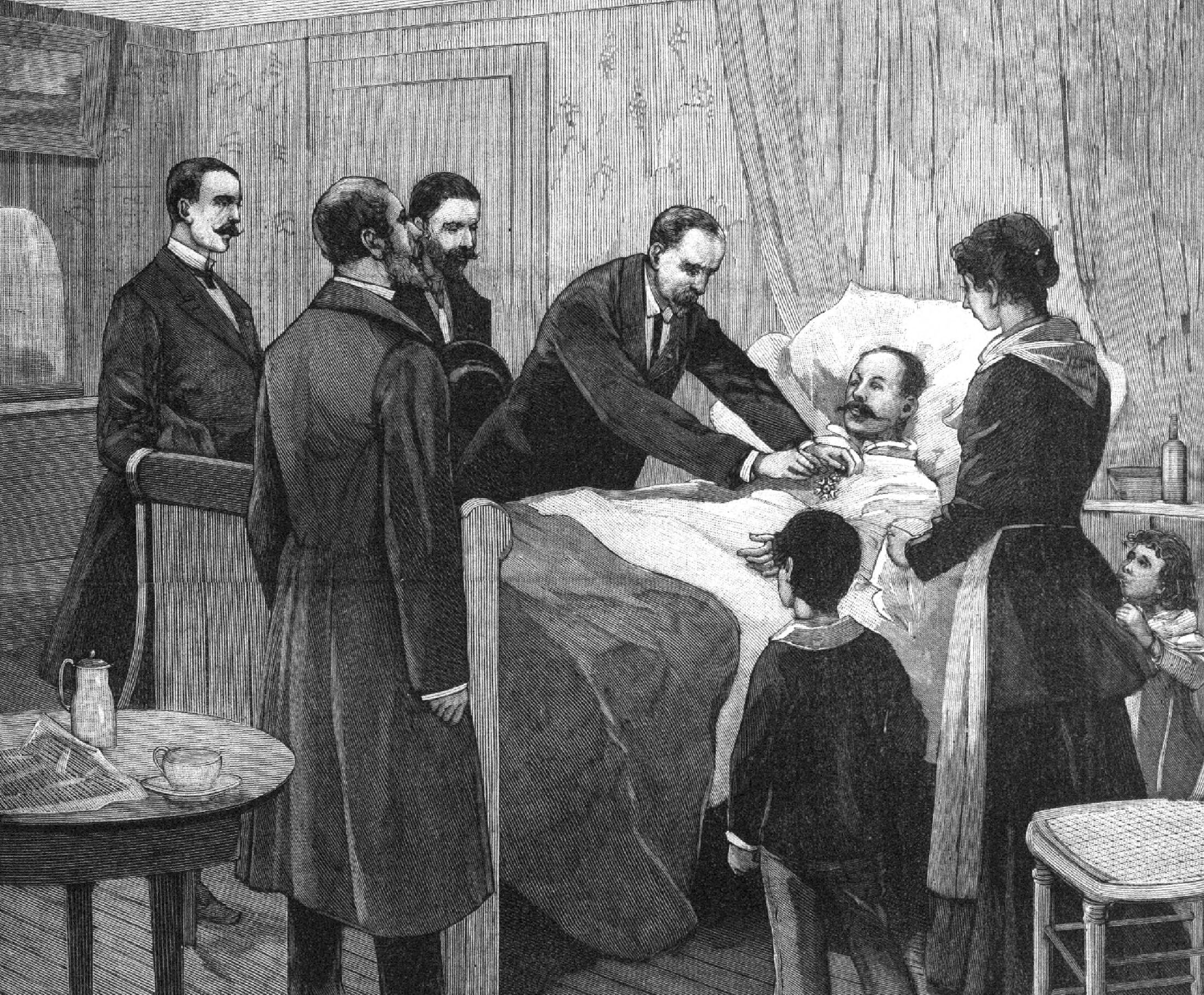
State propaganda in the press – Poisson receiving the Legion of Honor from prefect Lépine

Upon his arrest, Henry was quickly visited by several police officials, including Prefect Lépine, who sought to identify him and understand his motives. The anarchist claimed to be from "the provinces", called himself Breton, and denied any involvement in the attack. When he was transferred a few hours later, a gathered crowd insulted him as he entered the police car, to which he shouted that they were cowards.

A group of anarchists, possibly consisting of Matha, Ortiz, and Désiré Pauwels, most likely went to Henry's residence and removed the explosives kept there. It is possible that these were the explosives used by Pauwels in the Madeleine bombing a month later.

In the weeks following his incarceration and during his trial, Henry announced that he had premeditated this attack and took full responsibility. He launched into a rhetoric where he advocated for mass terrorism, claiming he chose to act through mass terrorism in response to the state's mass repressions.

Upon learning of the attack and his brother's arrest, Fortuné Henry was deeply affected. He strongly disagreed with Henry's interpretation of events and hinted to lawyer Hornbostel that the profound motive for the attack was a sentimental one. He believed that Henry's action was far more rooted in a desire to impress Élisa Gauthey than in a premeditated plan that would have seen him theorizing mass terrorism and intending to carry it out beforehand.

This perspective is supported by more recent historians, who note that Henry's plan and movements on the day of the attack were highly erratic, and he seemed driven by a sense of urgency—he had to commit an attack that day to avoid losing his bravitude or would have changed opinions after meeting Matha, being afraid to change course after their discussion. Furthermore, this sentimental strategy appears to have been somewhat effective, as Gauthey expressed regret for having rejected Henry, stating that if she had the choice again, she would act differently. More broadly, she seemed relatively impressed by the anarchist's actions.

After a trial where Henry declared himself the sole culprit and made a notable statement—in which he defended and theorized, likely for the first time in history, modern or mass terrorism—he was condemned to death. The sentence did not seem to bother him greatly, and he was guillotined a month later. Sadi Carnot, who refused to give him his pardon, as with Vaillant and Ravachol, was assassinated a few months later by Sante Caserio.

== Reactions and analyses ==
=== Anarchist circles and thought ===
Henry’s attack took both anarchists and French society as a whole by surprise. The completely indiscriminate nature of the bombing was particularly shocking. Anarchist circles distanced themselves from such an indiscriminate attack; most anarchists rejected this act, as it did not target a specific figure of power or the bourgeoisie. Le Révolté, led by Jean Grave, denounced Henry, writing:

Let this be clearly understood: every time an explosion does not target authority, wealth, or capitalist exploitation, one can safely attribute it to those who have an interest in discrediting us. We know exactly what kind of scoundrels we are talking about.

While most anarchists rejected his actions, some—particularly within the individualist anarchist tendency—considered them legitimate. In certain individualist defenses of Henry, the idea of propaganda by deed was secondary; he acted simply because his "disgust had reached its maximum intensity".

=== Birth of modern terrorism ===
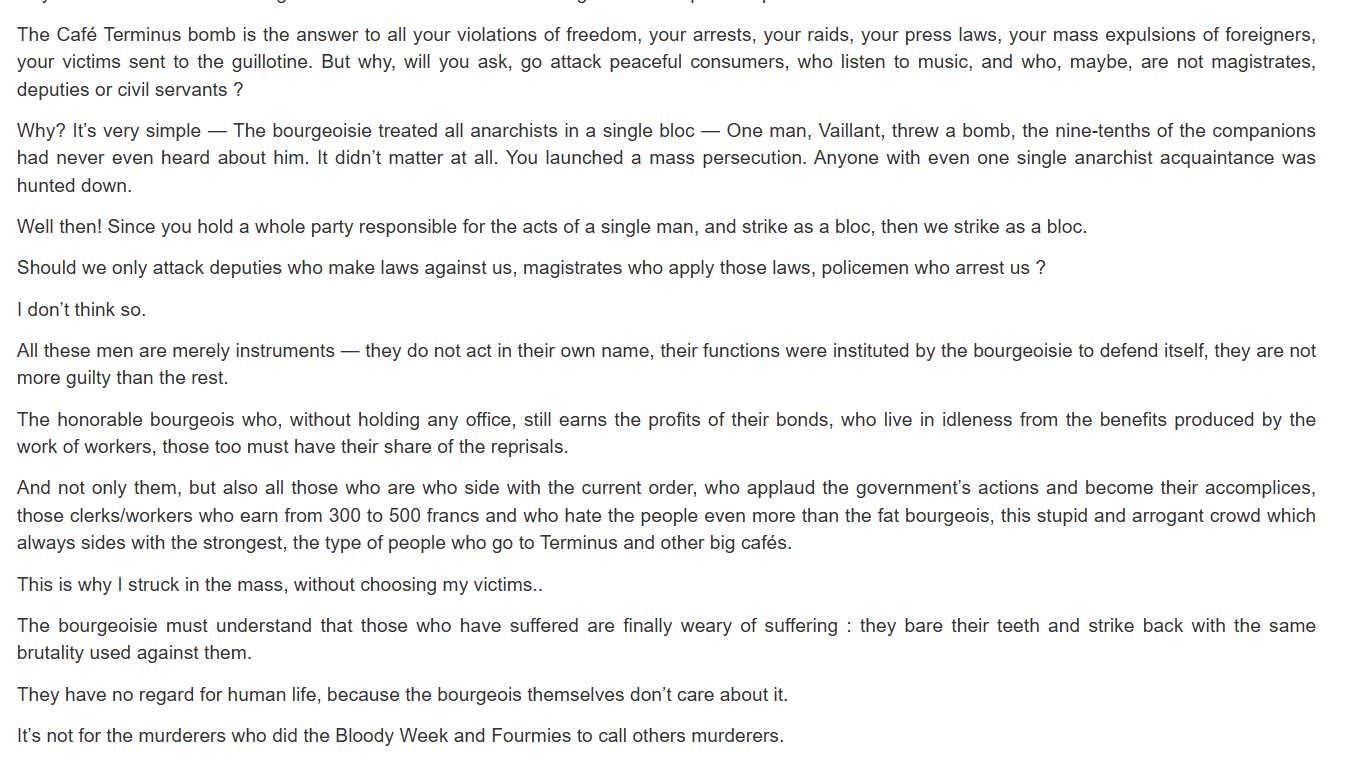
Excerpt of Henry's declaration at his trial where he speaks about indiscriminate terrorism

This attack, along with those by Léon Léauthier on 13 November 1893, and by Santiago Salvador at the Liceu on 7 November 1893, is considered one of the first acts of mass and modern terrorism. However, since Léauthier refused to take responsibility for his act at trial, and Salvador's trial took place after Henry's, Henry's declaration was the first to theorize such a terrorist strategy. This characterization is shared by historians like Ferragu, Merriman, Petit, and Badier from various perspectives, but criticized by Salomé, who believes a specific bourgeois enemy was targeted. For Petit, this evolution toward mass terrorism is not linked to anarchism but rather to the sentimental reasons that drove Henry to act. This is evidenced by the unprepared and erratic nature of Henry's actions, as well as his grandiose statements at his trial, intended to impress Gauthey.

While this form of terrorism had very limited or no impact on subsequent anarchist terrorism, which either disappeared or reverted to more traditional forms of tyrannicide, it was quickly adopted by diverse terrorist groups until at least the first half of the 21st century. Merriman illustrates this influence by noting that Henry's intellectual shift in his trial declaration—where he came to view the entire society as guilty and thus a legitimate target—is found in very different forms of terrorism, such as Islamic terrorism. However, he cautions that such a comparison must be made with great care, as the respective ideologies are very different and opposed. Nevertheless, this aspect of a guilty and indiscriminately targeted society is present in both Henry's actions and these other movements. Ferragu writes about this "massification" of terrorism:

By striking 'indiscriminately,' Émile Henry redefined the frameworks of the attack, ultimately surpassing the old scheme of tyrannicide in favor of modern terrorism in that it indiscriminately strikes a society defined both as a target and as an objective enemy (the 'bourgeoisie').

According to Petit and Delpech, this presentation needs to be nuanced by considering, on one hand, the fact that Henry acted sentimentally, but also that he sought to save his accomplices. Therefore, in his declarations and famous text, he tended to emphasize his own violence and theorization of mass terrorism more than the real reasons. The declaration would thus indeed be indicative of this evolution of terrorism but would be a reconstruction of events by Henry after the fact.

=== Open questions ===
The Café Terminus attack, like other events of its kind, presents several historiographical challenges, particularly concerning Henry's accomplices. According to Bouhey, it is indeed plausible that the attack—in its initial form aimed at killing Carnot—was prepared in concert by several anarchists. Among them could have been Henry and potentially Ortiz, Chiericotti, Marocco, Pauwels, Matha, and other individuals operating within these circles.

== Bibliography ==
- Badier, Walter (2010), "Émile Henry, le « Saint-Just de l'Anarchie »" [Émile Henry, the 'Saint-Just of Anarchy'], Parlement[s] (in French), vol. 14, no. 2, Paris: Revue d'histoire politique, pp. 159–171, doi:10.3917/parl.014.0159
- Bouhey, Vivien (2008), Les Anarchistes contre la République [The Anarchists against the Republic] (in French), Rennes: Presses universitaires de Rennes (PUR), ISBN 9782753507272
- Chambost, Anne-Sophie (2017), "« Nous ferons de notre pire… ». Anarchie, illégalisme … et lois scélérates" [«We’ll Do our Worse». Anarchy, Illegalism … and Evil Law], Droit et Cultures (in French), 74 (2): 65–87, doi:10.4000/droitcultures.4264
- Delpech, Jean-Marc (2006), Parcours et réseaux d'un anarchiste : Alexandre Marius Jacob : 1879-1954 (PhD thesis) [The life and networks of an anarchist: Alexandre Marius Jacob: 1879-1954] (PDF), Nancy: Université de Nancy 2, archived (PDF) from the original on 5 April 2025
- Ferragu, Gilles (2019), "L'écho des bombes : l'invention du terrorisme « à l'aveugle » (1893-1895)" [The echo of bombs: The invention of indiscriminate terrorism (1893–1895)], Ethnologie française (in French), 49 (1): 21–31, doi:10.3917/ethn.191.0021
- Jourdain, Edouard (2013). L'anarchisme [Anarchism]. Paris: La Découverte. ISBN 978-2-7071-9091-8.
- Merriman, John M. (2016). The dynamite club: how a bombing in fin-de-siècle Paris ignited the age of modern terror. Yale University Press. ISBN 978-0-300-21792-6.
- Petit, Dominique (2023), Fortuné Henry et la colonie libertaire d'Aiglemont : de la propagande pour Ravachol au syndicalisme révolutionnaire [Fortuné Henry and the Aiglemont Libertarian Colony: From Propaganda for Ravachol to Revolutionary Syndicalism], Paris: Terres Ardennaises / Noir et Rouge
- Salomé, Karine (2011), L'Ouragan homicide : L'attentat politique en France au XIXe siècle [The homicidal Hurricane: political assassination in 19th century France] (in French), Paris: Champ Vallon / Epoque, ISBN 978-2-87673-538-5
- Ward, Colin (2004). Anarchism: A Very Short Introduction. Oxford University Press (OUP).
