= Carmaux-Bons Enfants bombing =

1892 anarchist bombing in Paris, France

- Part of Ère des attentats
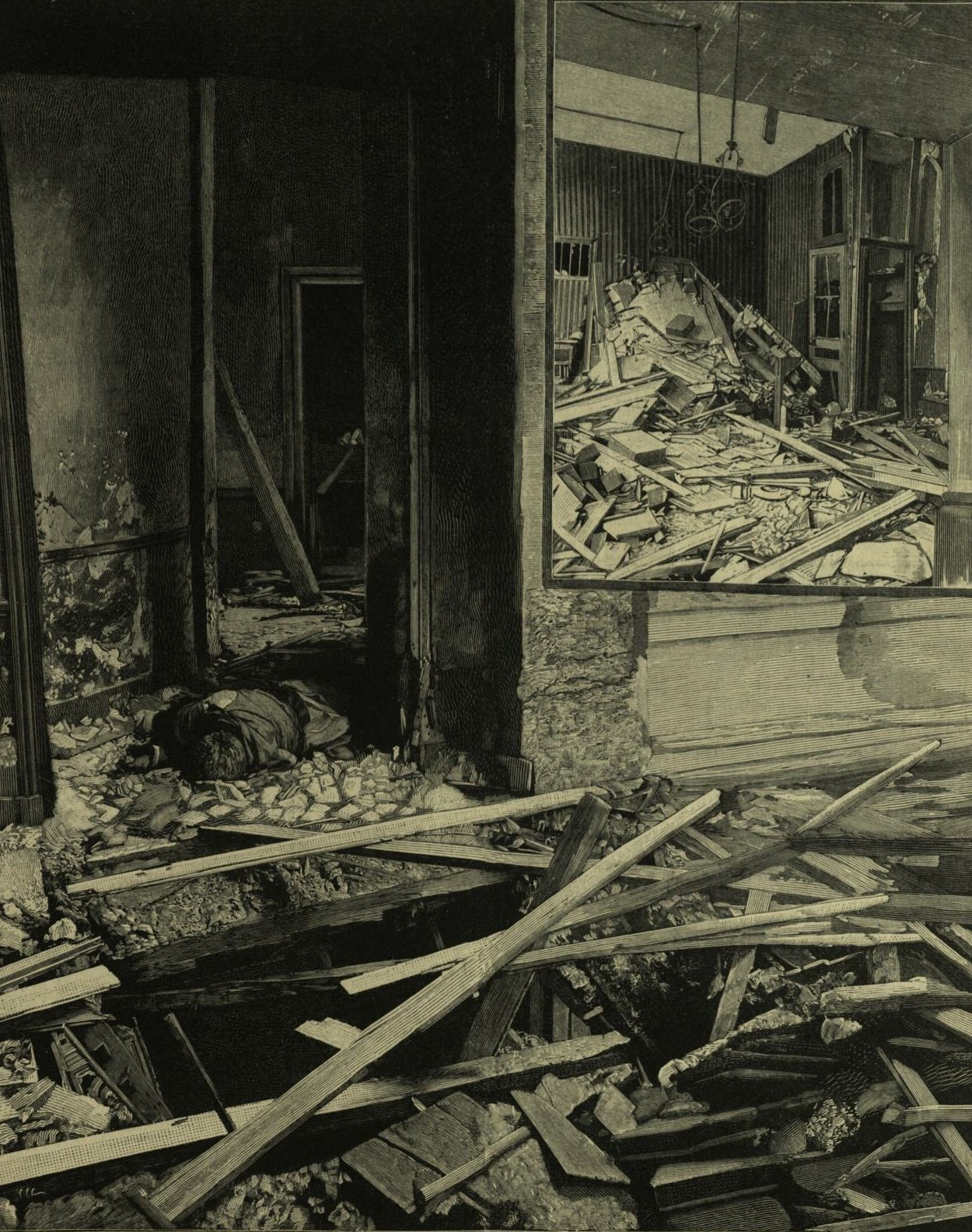
- Representation of the Bons Enfants bombing in L'Illustrazione Italiana (20 November 1892)
- Location: 48°51′55″N 2°19′54″E; Paris
- Date: 8 november 1892
- Attack type: bombing
- Weapon: tilt-sensitive bomb
- Deaths: 5
- Injuries: 0
- Perpetrator: Émile Henry
- No. of participants: Unknown
- Motive: Anarchism
- Verdict: Guilty
- Convicted: 1

On 8 November 1892, the anarchist Émile Henry carried out a bomb attack in Paris. The attack was carried out in response to the army being sent against the striking workers of the Compagnie minière de Carmaux. Henry sent a parcel bomb to the company's headquarters in Paris, located on Avenue de l'Opéra. The company forwarded the parcel to the police, who took possession of it and brought it to the police station on Rue des Bons Enfants. The bomb exploded while the police were handling it, killing four police officers and a Carmaux company's worker. This bombing, along with other attacks during the Era of Attacks, marked an early shift in terrorist strategy: instead of targeting specific individuals, it focused on symbolic locations—in this case, the siege of the mining company as a stand-in for a precise human target. This shift became a hallmark of modern terrorism but was poorly understood by contemporaries.

It was the most lethal attack in France during the Era of Attacks and preceded other attacks, like the Terminus bombing.

== History ==
=== Context ===
In 1892, following the brutal firing of Jean-Baptiste Calvignac, a socialist and trade unionist working at the Carmaux mine, after his election as mayor of Carmaux, a large-scale strike erupted within the mine and its associated glassworks. What began as a small local movement quickly spread and gained national attention, including from prominent socialists, like Jean Jaurès. This prompted the government to send in the army to force the workers to return to work. Although the social movement was not over and would, in fact, continue after Henry's death, he saw the moment when President Émile Loubet brought in the army as proof that peaceful methods would not work. He then decided to take action and carry out an attack targeting the headquarters of the Compagnie minière de Carmaux in Paris. For him, this was an act of propaganda by the deed.

=== Events ===
After coordinating with other anarchists, Henry sent a parcel bomb to the company's headquarters at 11 Avenue de l'Opéra, which arrived on the morning of 8 November 1892. The parcel contained a tilt-sensitive bomb, a type never before used except by Russian nihilists, making it particularly lethal. The building's concierge took possession of it and handed it over to the police. The bomb exploded at the police station on Rue des Bons-Enfants at 11:37 a.m., killing four police officers and a company worker.

The attack was the most lethal of the 1892-1894 anarchist attacks in France.

=== After ===
After the attack, Henry fled to the United Kingdom and then to Belgium before returning to France. There, he adopted an illegalist lifestyle and carried out other attacks, like the Terminus bombing, before being arrested by the police, sentenced to death, and eventually guillotined.

== Legacy ==
=== Anarchist circles ===
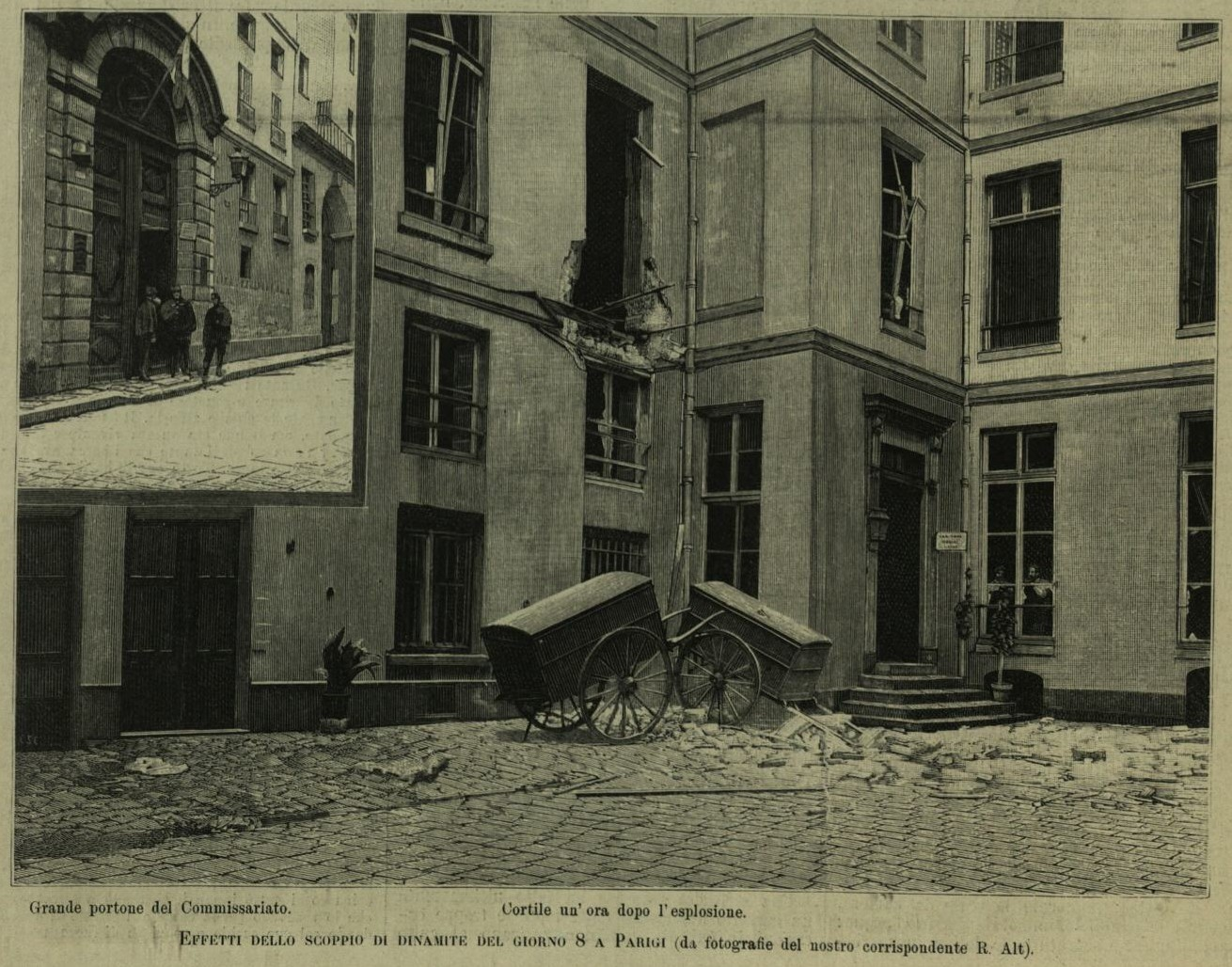
Bons Enfants bombing in L'Illustrazione Italiana

Most anarchists supported the attack, but some expressed doubts about the initial target, which was not a police station but a company made up of civilian workers. Reflecting on this a few years later, Jean Grave remarked:

The bomb [...] had been smarter than its makers. Had it exploded on Avenue de l'Opéra, [...] it could have turned public opinion against the anarchists. Whereas at the police station, it didn’t matter at all.

=== Shift in the scope of terrorism ===
The Carmaux-Bons-Enfants bombing, like other attacks during the Era of Attacks (1892–1894) marked the emergence of a terrorist symbolism tied to locations rather than individuals. Karine Salomé writes on this subject:

The ambiguity becomes even more pronounced with anarchist attacks, which were no longer exclusively linked to the presence of the head of state. Instead, they began targeting the homes of individuals from diverse backgrounds, such as magistrates Benoît and Bulot during the bombings on Boulevard Saint-Germain and Rue de Clichy in 1892. They also struck symbolic sites, including the Lobau barracks, the Carmaux Mining Company (initially targeted by the bomb that exploded at the Bons Enfants police station), the Madeleine church, the National Assembly, and the Terminus café. From then on, with the exception of Sadi Carnot’s assassination, anarchist attacks signaled a transition from symbolism centered on individuals —specifically the head of state—to symbolism centered on locations, a shift that contemporaries did not always comprehend.

== Bibliography ==
- Salomé, Karine (2011), L'Ouragan homicide : L'attentat politique en France au XIXe siècle [The homicidal Hurricane: political assassination in 19th century France], Paris: Champ Vallon / Epoque, ISBN 978-2-87673-538-5
