= Family evenings =

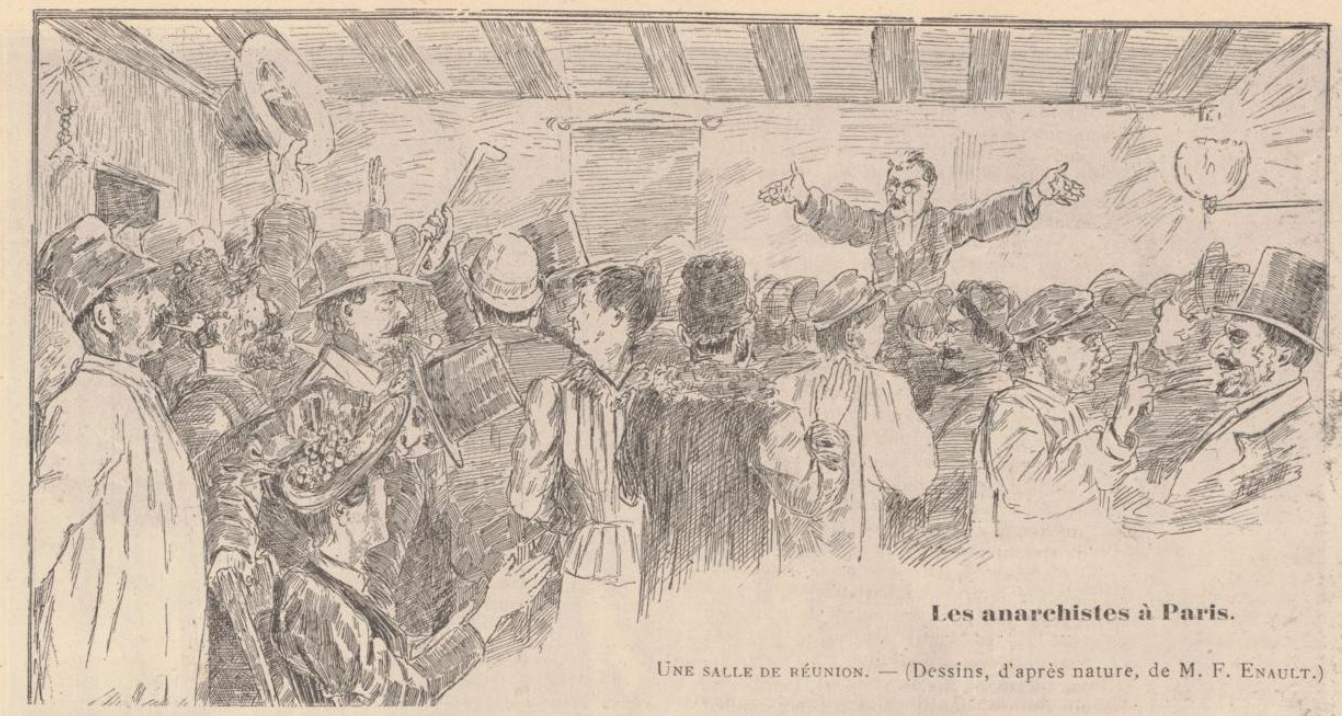
- Depiction of an anarchist meeting in Le Monde illustré, including probably Pierre Martinet (9 April 1892)
- Date: 1880s-1890s at least
- Motive: feed the people Share anarchist theories and ideology Provide a space to meet and coordinate
- Organized by: Anarchists
- Outcome: Tens of thousands (at least)

Family evenings or family gatherings (French: soirées de famille) were events held by anarchists in France and other parts of Western Europe starting in the 1880s. Bringing together between a hundred and a thousand participants, they offered a prime space for meeting and discussion for anarchists and were inseparable from companionship, the relationship system of the anarchist movement during this period.

These gatherings, organized by local groups and featuring food and drinks, often took place at the establishments of wine merchants who were often either anarchists or sympathizers at the time. They served as an entry point for women within the movement, as they were able to speak publicly and begin to make their voices heard. Furthermore, these family evenings helped transmit anarchist philosophy by organizing speeches, songs, and a variety of activist activities; they also served as a meeting place where anarchists could coordinate or exchange ideas.

The model of the family evening was mirrored in other initiatives, such as the soup conferences, which sought to reach a poorer population. Family evenings were fundamental to the functioning of the movement during this era.

== Background ==
The anarchist movement, founded around the Saint-Imier Congress in Switzerland in 1872, began to spread across Western Europe and then throughout the world. The first organization where anarchists gathered was the Anti-authoritarian International, but it disappeared during the 1880s. They subsequently developed a new system of relations, anarchist companionship, which allowed them to meet, coordinate, and interact with one another.

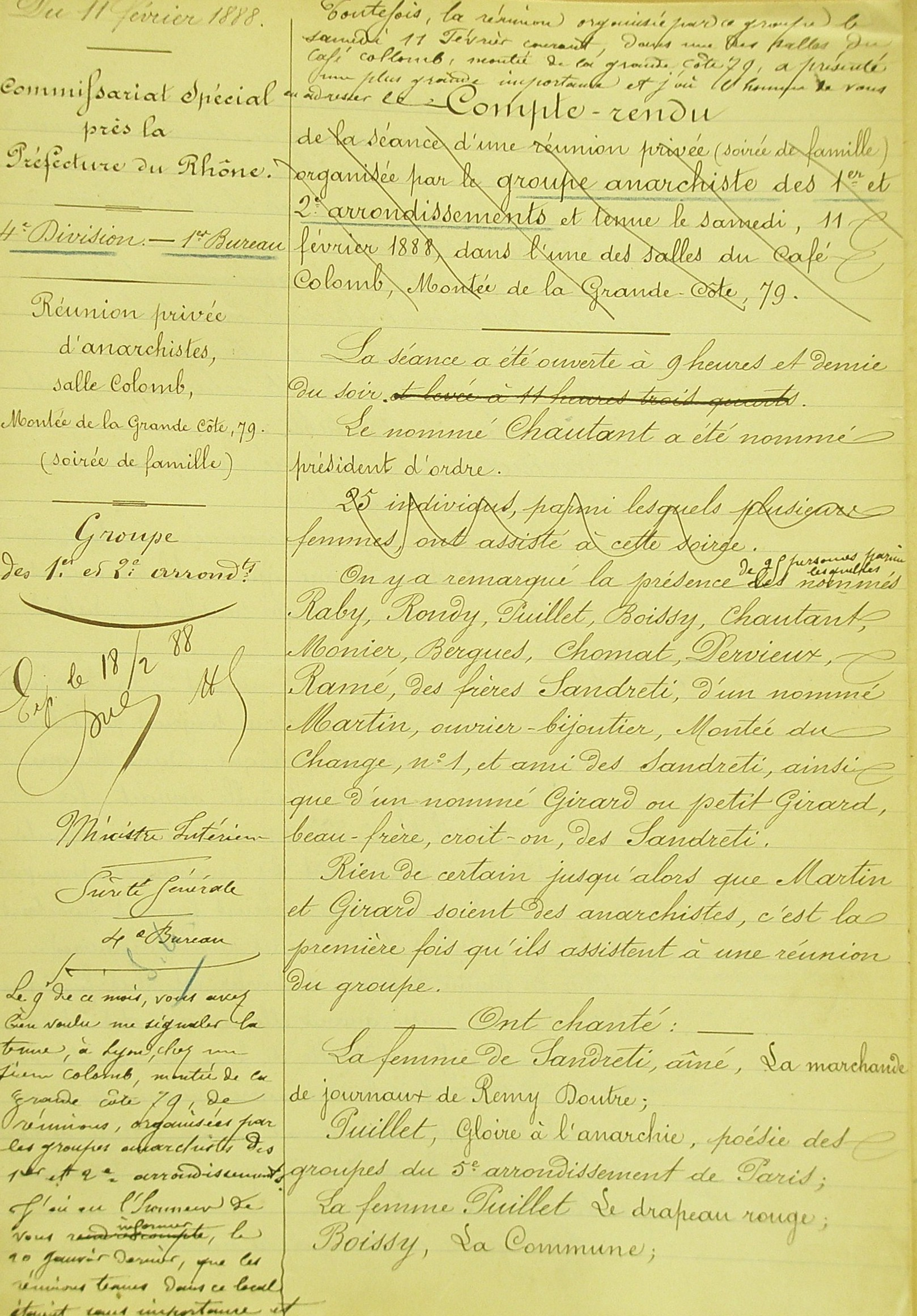
Police report on a family evening held in Lyon in 1888 (collections of Archives anarchistes)

Furthermore, while women were initially sidelined from the movement, they began to be integrated starting in the 1880s, a shift manifested in the creation of women's groups, such as the Louise Michel-Marie Ferré group in Lyon.

Wine merchants occupied a privileged position within the companionship of this period; their businesses often served as gathering places, and these merchants were generally noted as being anarchists themselves or sympathetic to the cause. For example, during the Clichy affair, the wine merchant who had hosted the involved companions testified in their defense and accused the police, according to the newspaper Le Père Peinard.

== History ==
Family evenings emerged within the context of companionship. Generally organized by a local anarchist group, though several might sometimes partner to launch them, these meetings were either private, intended solely for anarchists, or public, aimed at a broader audience. They were advertised in the anarchist press and targeted by the authorities; in France, it was common to find informants attending these gatherings.

These events were often held at the end of the week, such as on Sundays, when the anarchists were not working. At times, the companions would rent premises for the family evening, but since relations with certain landlords could be strained, they also had their own gathering places, such as the cabaret run by the couple Louis Duprat and Louise Pioger at 11 rue Ramey in Paris.

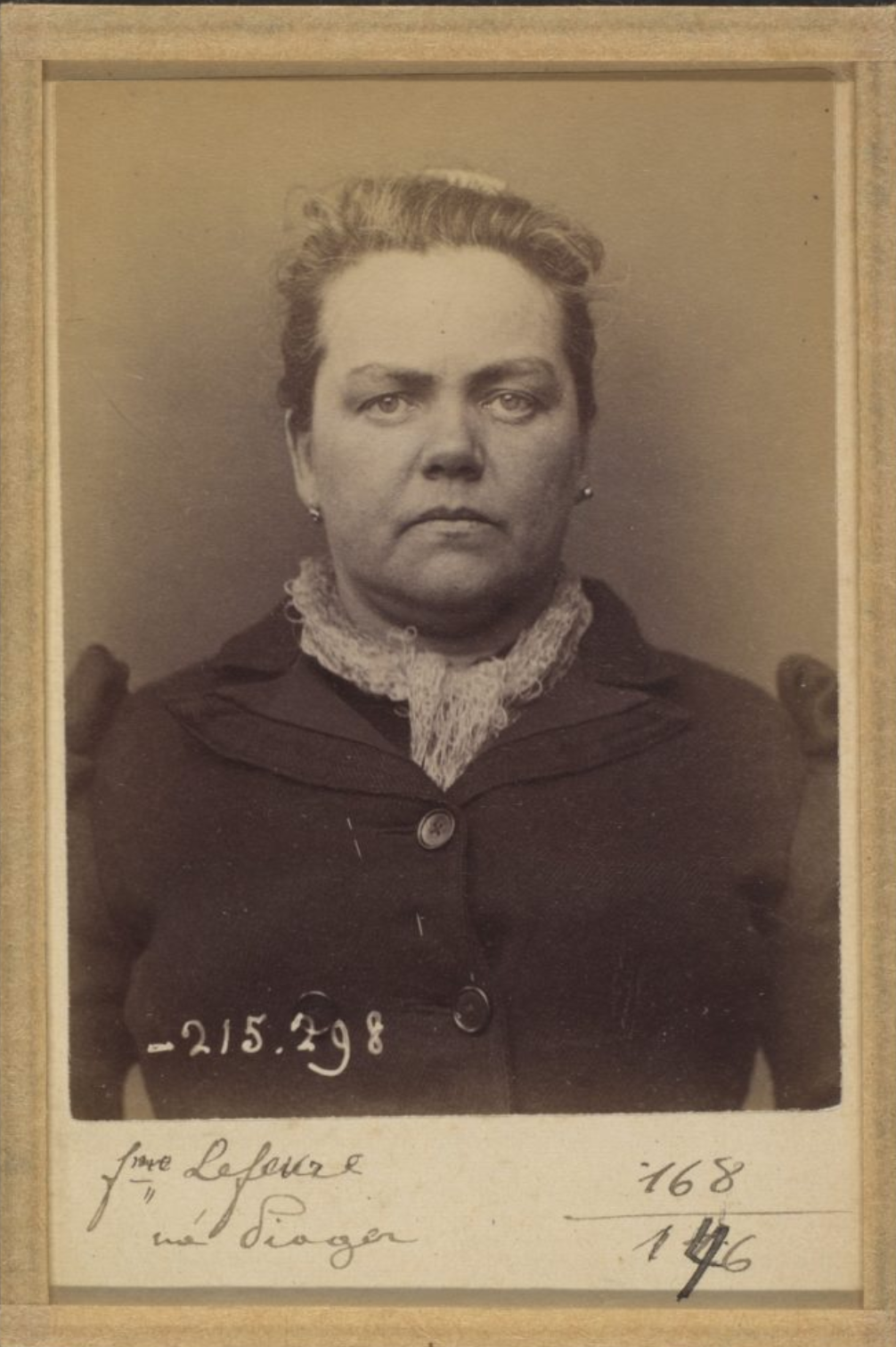
Louise Pioger's mugshot taken by Alphonse Bertillon (Anthropometric File of Anarchists - 1894)

As these gatherings were more open than the core anarchist groups, the partners and children of the companions attended them. Family evenings were also events for socializing and recognition: participants discussed ideas, introduced new companions, assessed the integrity of specific individuals, etc. Very frequently, they served as key venues for fundraising, particularly for the wives or children of imprisoned anarchists. These fundraisers could take various forms, including the organization of raffles.

In terms of figures, it is difficult to estimate exactly how many family evenings were held during the 1880s and 1890s, but they brought together anywhere from a hundred people for the more modest gatherings to nearly a thousand for the largest ones, depending on the locations involved.

Furthermore, the model of the family evening was expanded on a much larger scale during the soup conferences of the early 1890s, which reached tens of thousands of people in the Paris region.

== Legacy ==
The open nature of these gatherings led to more women entering the anarchist movement. Women began to express themselves through these events by doing speeches and carved out a place within the movement partly thanks to these evenings, where they could take the floor and make their voices heard. Historian Gaetano Manfredonia writes that this was then one of the "rare opportunities offered to them to take part, on an equal footing, in the public activities of their companions".

For historians John M. Merriman and Vivien Bouhey, these family evenings "punctuated" the life of the anarchist movement, providing it with tools to organize and coordinate. According to Bouhey, being an anarchist means being socialized among anarchists, and this period's socialization occurred primarily through family evenings.

== See also ==
- Food Not Bombs
- Soup kitchen

== Bibliography ==
- Baker, Zoe (2023), Means and Ends: The Revolutionary Practice of Anarchism in Europe and the United States, Edinburgh: AK Press, ISBN 978-1-84935-498-1
- Bouhey, Vivien (2008), Les Anarchistes contre la République [The Anarchists against the Republic] (in French), Rennes: Presses universitaires de Rennes (PUR)
- Merriman, John M. (2016). The dynamite club: how a bombing in fin-de-siècle Paris ignited the age of modern terror. Yale University Press. ISBN 978-0-300-21792-6.
- Tardif, Marie-Pier (2021), Ni ménagères, ni courtisanes. Les femmes de lettres dans la presse anarchiste française (1885-1905) (PhD thesis) [Neither housewives nor courtesans. Women writers in the French anarchist press (1885-1905)] (PDF)
