= Eugénie Collot =

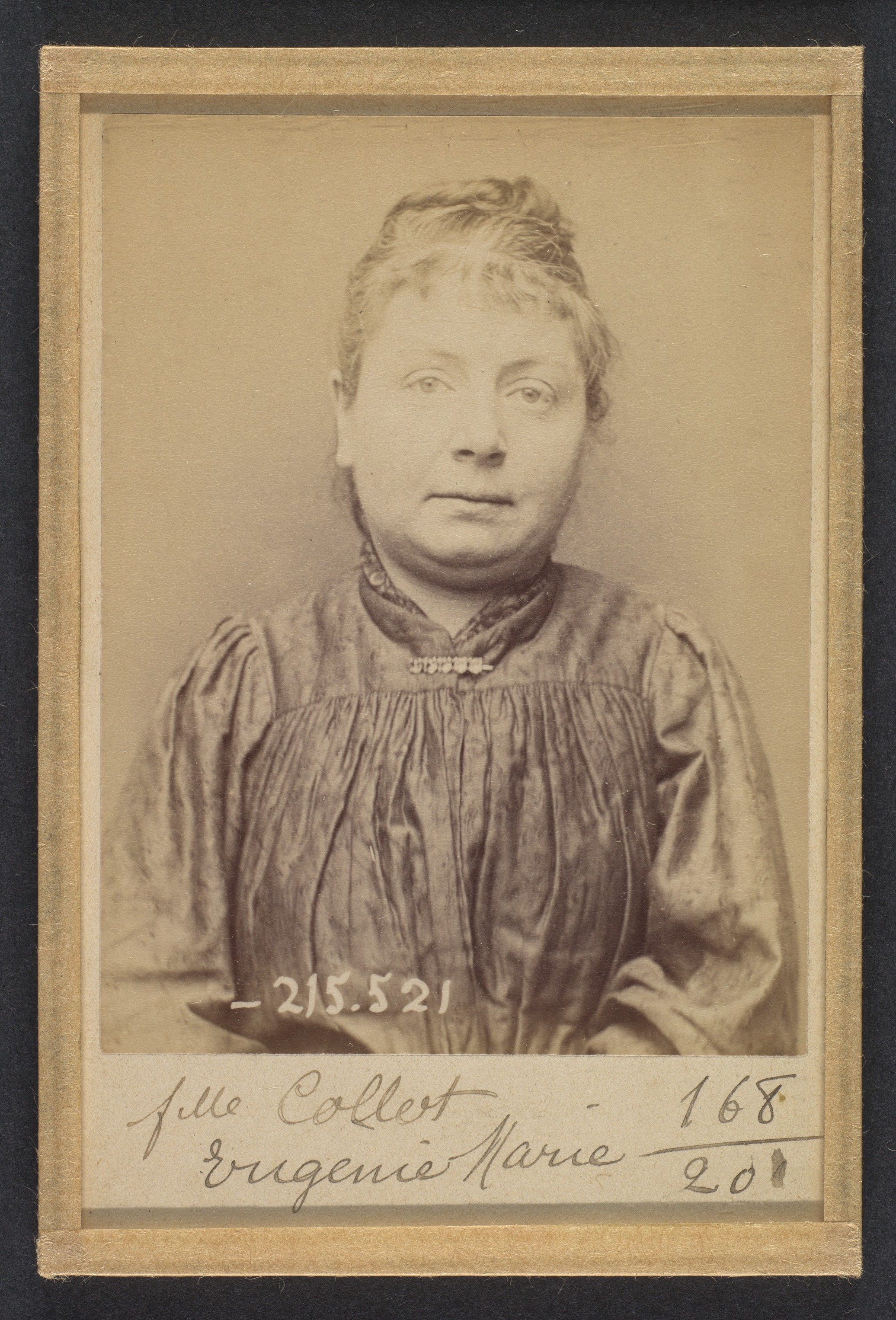
- Eugénie Collot's mugshot by Alphonse Bertillon (1894)
- Born: 3 June 1857; Paris
- Died: 24 April 1907 (aged 49); Paris
- Occupations: upholsterer, anarchist, feminist
- Known for: Anarchist, feminist and syndicalist activism
- Height: 1.51 m (4 ft 11 in)
- Movement: Anarchism

Eugénie Collot (1857-1907) was a French upholsterer, and an anarchist, feminist, and revolutionary syndicalist activist. Born into a working-class family, Collot became an upholsterer and, especially from the 1890s onwards, engaged in several social struggles. She became involved in French feminist and syndicalist circles; for example, she stood as a candidate in elections in 1890, was elected secretary of the upholsterers' union, which she founded, and of the Bourse du travail de Paris, which sent her as a delegate to the Second International's congress in Brussels.

An active anarchist, she played a "significant" role within the anarchist movement in France in the 1890s, notably by taking charge of the management of a number of organisations and events, such as the soup conferences or La Rénovation sociale par le travail ('Social Renovation through Work'), an organisation she founded and where she invited a number of anarchist figures, such as Élisée Reclus and Leo Tolstoy.

Despite her importance to the anarchist movement and other struggles, her memory faded into oblivion after her death.

== Biography ==
Eugénie Marie Collot was born in Paris on 3 June 1857. According to her birth certificate, her mother was Élisa Rouilly and her father Eugène Victor Collot.

While working as an upholsterer, in 1890, she was part of a list of female candidates for the Prud'hommes elections, a list supported by the Women's Emancipation League, as a protest against the ban on women standing for election. The following year, Collot was elected secretary of the newly created upholsterers' union, established to "fight against insufficient wages, unemployment, and lack of unity" in the profession.

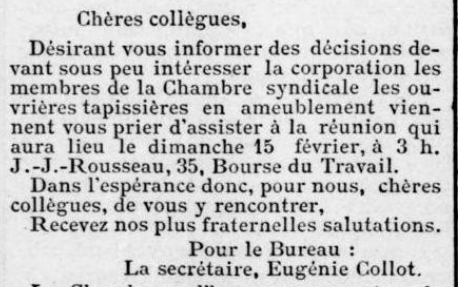
Eugénie Collot's call in Le Parti Ouvrier (1891)

A few months later, in July 1891, she was elected to the executive committee of the Bourse du Travail de Paris. She was delegated by the workers to represent them at the Second International's congress in Brussels. On 26 September 1892, she coordinated with her anarchist comrades to enable them to invade the platform as a diversion during a meeting dedicated to the ongoing Carmaux strikes.

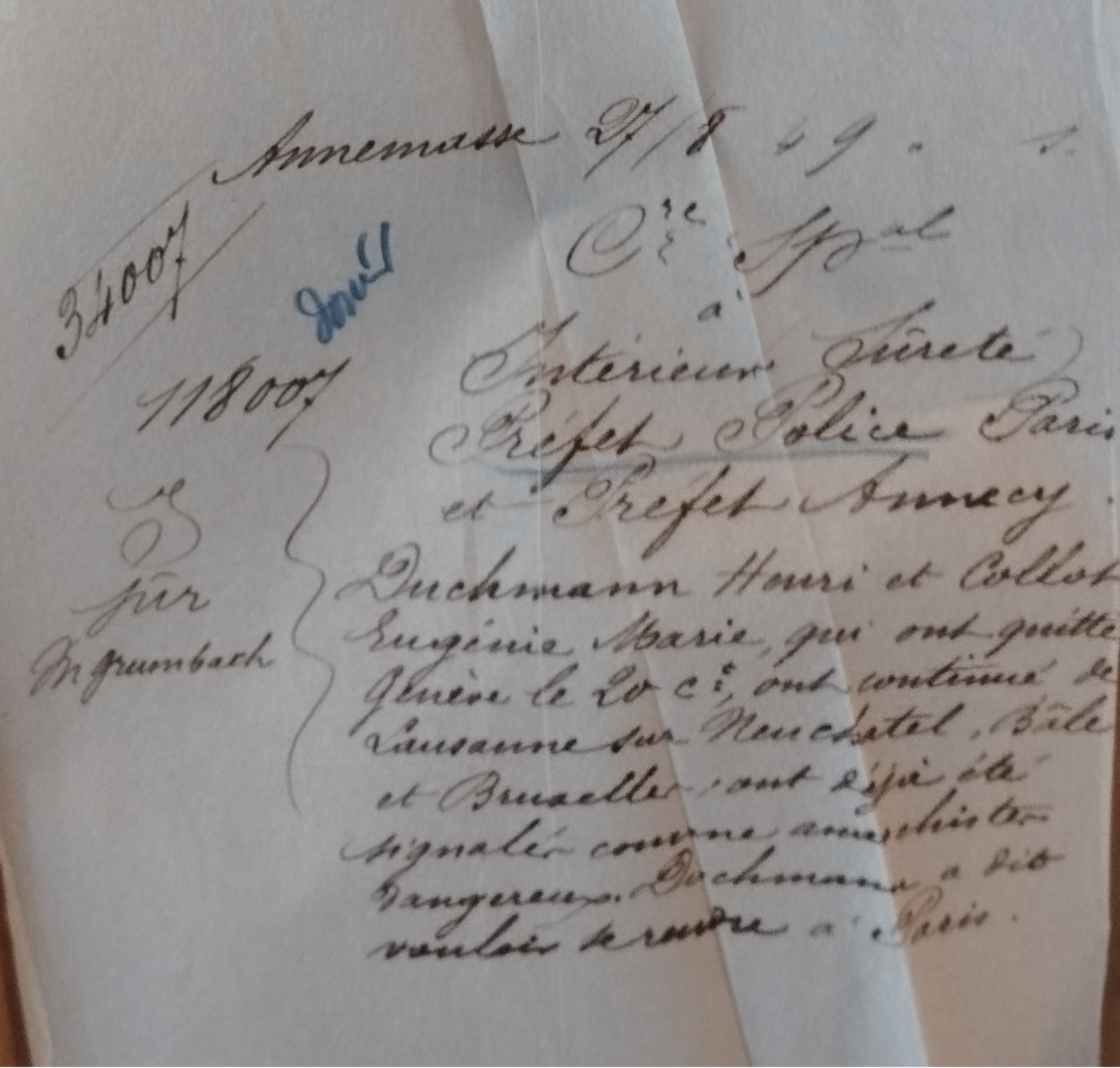
Police report on Collot describing her as a 'dangerous anarchist' and reporting on her travels in Switzerland (Archives nationales de France - courtesy of Archives anarchistes) (1895)

In December 1892, Collot joined the soup conferences and became a member of its Comité féminin ('Women Committee), in charge of its organization. She was considered not radical enough by some of her anarchist comrades and left the conference organization early the following year.

On 9 March 1893, as an abstentionist candidate, she, along with Constant Marie, was the main instigator of an anti-electoral rally where anarchists paraded with donkey ears through the streets of Paris. She and a certain Elisa, who might be Eliska Cooquus, carried placards, seized by the authorities, on which they had written:

We are creators, we want to be candidates! [feminization of the words in the French original]

Throughout 1893, she engaged in a series of rallies, where she spoke frequently, attacked the bourgeoisie and deputies, and defended anarchism. She proposed a motion to honour Ravachol in June 1893. At a meeting held shortly after, she attempted to change the minutes of a previous meeting – possibly the one including her motion about Ravachol – which led some people to call for her expulsion, without success.

She publicly continued her activism in favour of Ravachol and called on anarchists to gather in his memory, a direction taken up by anarchists who decided to go to the statue of Diderot, considered a precursor of anarchism by them. Collot went to the rally accompanied by Gaston Dubois, and as she presented a wreath of flowers to the statue, with the inscription "To Ravachol, dead for the truth!", they were arrested by the police and the wreath seized.

Released, she was raided on 11 March 1894 and arrested the following day for criminal conspiracy. She remained in prison for over three months without trial, then was released. Upon her release, the anarchist wrote to the judge who had ordered her incarceration, declaring that she had placed a crown of thorns on Auguste Vaillant's grave.

In 1898, the militant relaunched L'Idée nouvelle ('The New Idea'), an anarchist society that organised conferences and had been interrupted during the repression of January and February 1894. She invited various anarchist artistic personalities, such as Laurent Tailhade, Fernand Pelloutier, Pierre Quillard, Zo d’Axa, and Adolphe Retté, to speak in favour of anarchism or against antisemitism. Théophile Steinlen gave her a drawing so that she could sell reproductions of it and thus secure the organisation's financial means.

During one of these conferences, the speakers aimed to denounce Spain's crimes during the Cuban War of Independence, and thereby to "rehabilitate history in reaction to the misleading information published in the bourgeois press".

In 1900, her organisation was renamed La Rénovation sociale par le travail ('Social Renovation through Work') and now included Eugène Carrière, Elisée Reclus, Steinlen, and even Leo Tolstoy on its executive committee. From 1902, La Rénovation sociale par le travail took a less subversive direction and focused on scientific subjects.

She continued her activism at least until 1905, when she petitioned for the creation of labour inspection in French Algeria.

Eugénie Collot died in Paris on 24 April 1907.

== Legacy ==
=== Memory and oblivion ===
Although Eugénie Collot was one of the activists with a "significant" role in the anarchist movement of her time, her memory did not pass into posterity, according to researcher Marie-Pier Tardif.

=== Police mugshot ===
Her police mugshot is part of the collections of the Metropolitan Museum of Art (MET).

== Bibliography ==
- Petit, Dominique (2024), "COLLOT Marie, Eugénie", Dictionnaire des anarchistes (Le Maitron), Paris: Le Maitron des anarchistes
- Tardif, Marie-Pier (2021), Ni ménagères, ni courtisanes. Les femmes de lettres dans la presse anarchiste française (1885-1905) (PhD thesis) [Neither housewives nor courtesans. Women writers in the French anarchist press (1885-1905)] (PDF)
