= Pierre Martinet (anarchist) =

French anarchist activist

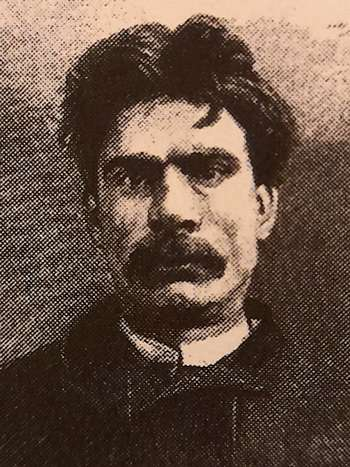
- Born: Pierre Paul Martinet; 5 May 1848; Laudun-l'Ardoise
- Died: 6 October 1919; Clermont
- Occupations: Anarchist, theorist, criminal

Pierre Martinet, nicknamed Pol or the Pariah (1848-1919), was a French anarchist and dreyfusard activist. He is best known for being one of the principal founders of European individualist anarchism.

Born into a family of landowners, Martinet committed several offenses in his youth before gradually joining the anarchist movement in the 1880s. In 1884, he gained prominence as one of the key figures in the salle Lévis affair, a meeting where Blanquist socialists and anarchists clashed violently. Months later, he assaulted deputy Achille Scrépel at another meeting and fled France. Pursued by creditors in Switzerland, he returned to France, where he was arrested and imprisoned.

Upon his release from prison in the late 1880s, Martinet rejoined French and Parisian anarchist circles, becoming one of the first militants to self-identify as an individualist anarchist. He published two newspapers, L'Anarchie (1890–1891) and La Renaissance (1895–1896), which were some of the earliest European anarchist individualist publications and engaged in various demonstrations, conferences and gatherings, like the soup-conferences. Known for his reputation as a violent activist, his erratic behavior and surprising financial ease led various French anarchists to suspect him of being a police informant—a charge he denied. Jean Grave, in particular, maintained a deeply contentious relationship with him. Despite these accusations, Martinet remained connected to prominent anarchists of the era, including Charles Malato, Vittorio Pini, and Ravachol, the latter two requesting his intervention at their trials to defend them.

After the Dreyfus affair, where he fought against antisemitism, Martinet gradually withdrew from activism, dedicating himself to acting in and writing theatrical plays. By 1918, Malato noted that he had entirely abandoned anarchism and become a property owner.

== Biography ==
=== Youth and early actions ===
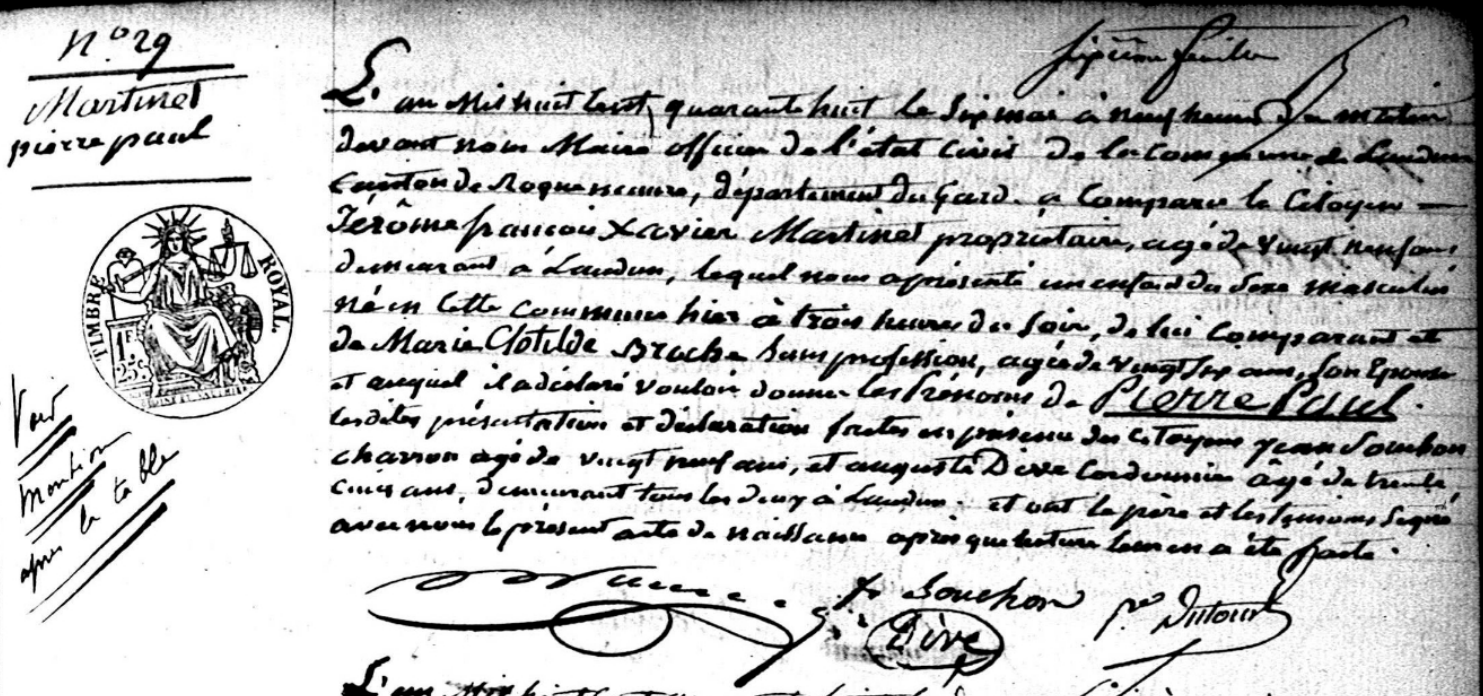
Birth certificate of Pierre Martinet (6 May 1848). Archives départementales du Gard.

Pierre Paul Désiré Martinet was born in Laudun on 5 May 1848. He was the son o Marie Clotilde Brache, who had no profession, and a landowner from the Gard department named Jérôme François Xavier Martinet. He began to be repeatedly sentenced by the French justice system for various offenses, in the following order:

- In 1866, in Marseille, eight days in prison for carrying a prohibited weapon;
- In 1867, in Nîmes, two years for theft;
- In 1871, six months in prison for seditious crimes;
- In 1873, in Paris, five years in prison and five years of surveillance for theft and insults;
- In 1880, in Paris, fifteen months in prison for theft, breach of trust, and offenses against public morals.

He joined the anarchist movement, becoming a companion during this period, and was registered by the police as an anarchist from 1884 onward. At an anarchist meeting held in late November 1884, he gave a speech, and in the ensuing chaos, he protected the journalists present—particularly Gabriel Terrail—by shouting, 'Companions, remember, they are our guests!'

=== Salle Lévis affair ===
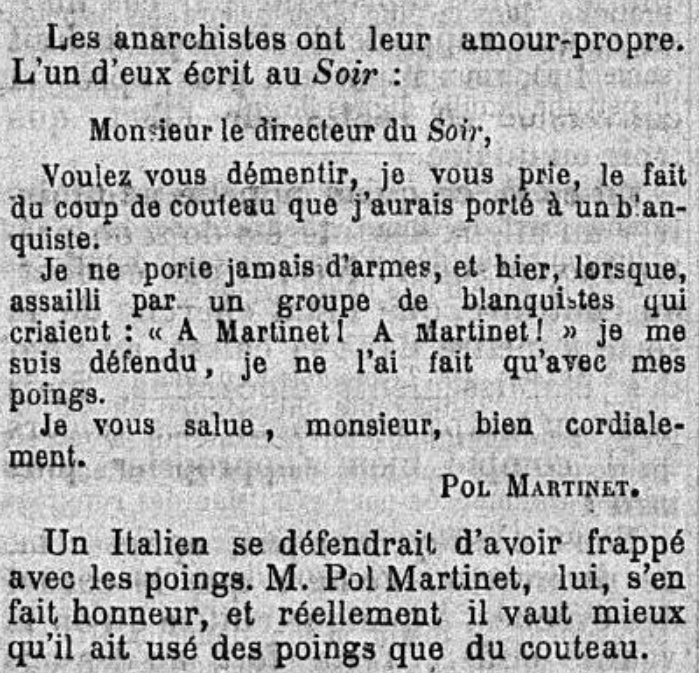
Martinet's response to media accounts of him using a knife during the salle Lévis affair, in L'Univers (31 December 1884)

On 8 December 1884, an important meeting of the French labour movement took place at the Salle Lévis, gathering over three thousand participants. Several Blanquist socialist speakers were present, including Édouard Vaillant and Jules Guesde. Along the corridors leading to the hall, Blanquist militants were ordered to guard the area and prevent anarchists from entering. They also secured the podium. One of the anarchist speakers, Gustave Leboucher, attempted to enter but was turned away and ended up in the street. However, a group of around thirty anarchist companions, with Martinet among the leaders, soon arrived at the entrance and began forcing their way through the corridors to reach the hall.

They managed to enter after a few scuffles, pushing back the socialist militants blocking their way. Once inside the meeting, they moved to the left side of the platform, where they were not stopped and settled in. They rejected any legitimacy of the electoral process that had begun without them and sought to have Leboucher and Ponchet elected in place of Vaillant, who was being chosen. Ponchet climbed onto the platform, declaring that workers should elect a worker, not Vaillant, but he was quickly pushed back. Another anarchist militant, Daniel, attempted to speak next but was prevented from doing so.

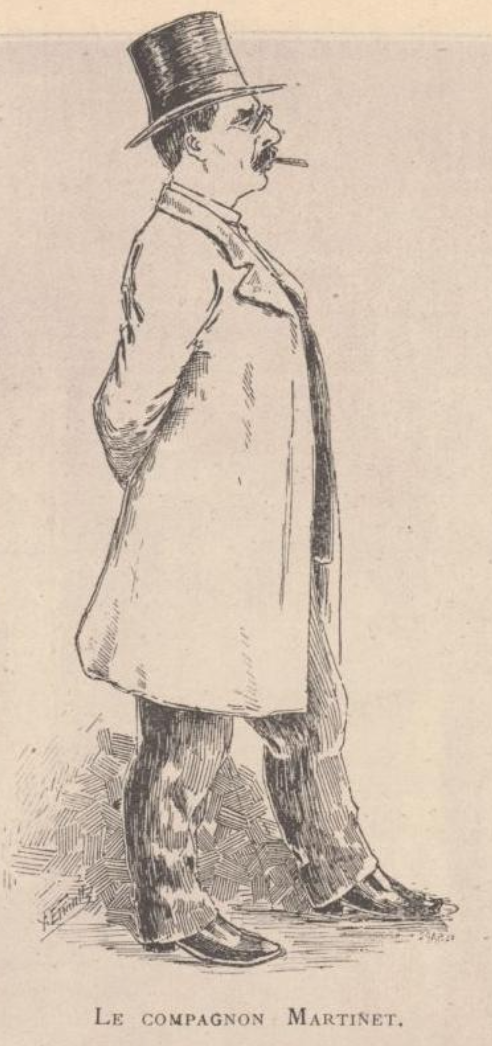
Depiction of Pierre Martinet in Le Monde illustré (9 April 1892)

Meanwhile, as the socialists were preparing to bring another of their speakers to the podium, the anarchists present took the hammers they had brought, smashed the tables in front of them, armed themselves with the debris, and charged the platform and the socialist security cordon surrounding Vaillant. They attempted to climb the platform three times, but the socialists controlling it threw carafes and struck them with canes, making it impossible to ascend. Then, Martinet led a flanking maneuver with his companions, managing to reach the platform from the side. Once there, the anarchists engaged in close combat with the socialists. Meanwhile, a large number of socialists in the room began fleeing towards the exit as the police arrived outside amidst the chaos—long corridors made escaping more difficult, and the fight continued. The anarchists, vastly outnumbered but now on the platform, fought using tables, chairs, and knives. Some socialists near the exit managed to dislodge paving stones from the ground and began hurling them at the platform, further adding to the chaos. An elderly man close to Blanqui was recognized by several anarchists, who attacked him. The socialists eventually decided to flee the hall, and the disorder continued at the entrance to the Salle Lévis. The anarchists took control of the platform and began speaking to those who remained. Outside, the socialists, dissatisfied at being 'demolished' by only thirty militants, attempted a counterattack but failed. The police eventually entered the room and arrested several anarchist militants.

A few days later, Martinet wrote to Le Soir to request a correction to the claim that he had used a knife during the incident.

In early 1885, he participated in Leboucher’s trial as a defense witness. He asserted that his arrested comrade had done nothing wrong and deserved to be acquitted by the court. He also criticized the justice system for treating the bourgeois more leniently than workers like Leboucher. The prosecutor interrupted him, read out his criminal record, then declared that for the honor of justice, Martinet could not be allowed to speak further and expelled him from the courtroom.

=== Continuation of his activities, conflicts, and suspicions ===
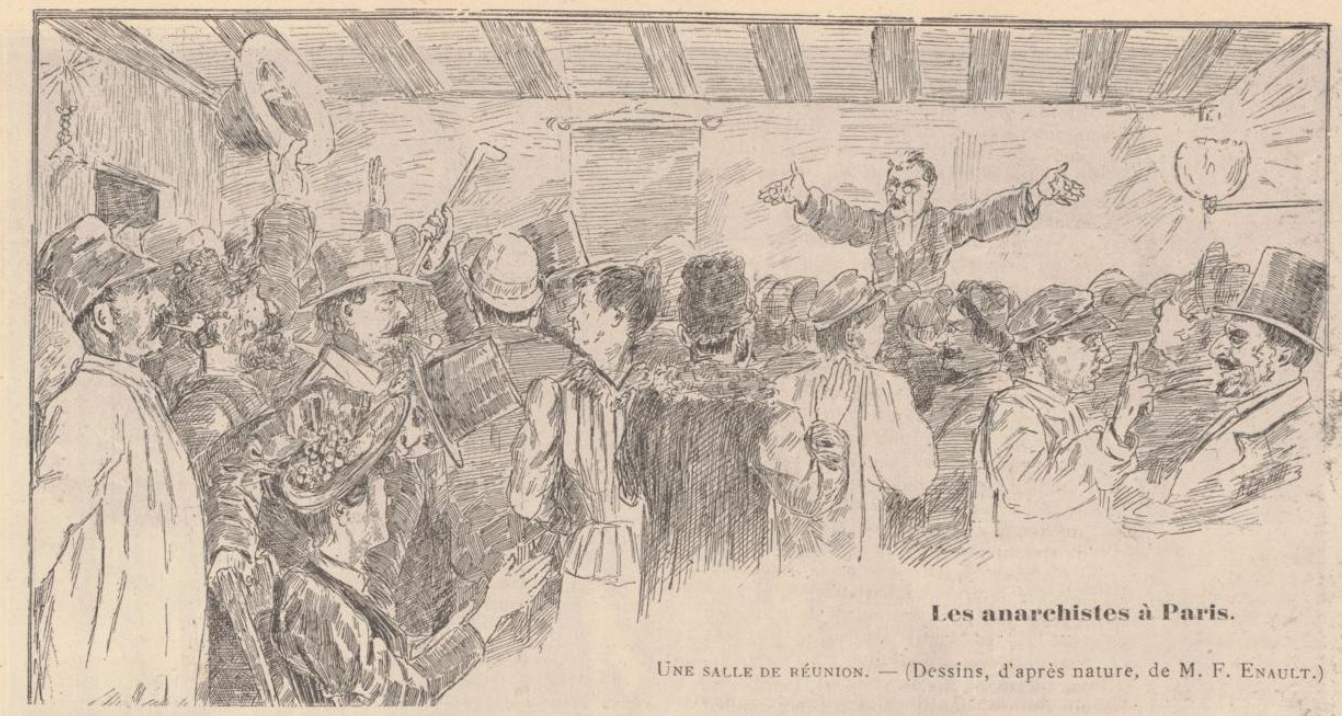
Pierre Martinet (?) speaking at an anarchist meeting in Le Monde illustré (9 April 1892)

While illegalism—an ideology blending crime and anarchism—was not yet established, emerging later from the actions of figures like Clément Duval and the Intransigents of London and Paris such as Vittorio Pini, Martinet faced accusations from fellow anarchists. They criticized him for being a criminal to speak in defense of a militant, deeming it unworthy. Martinet had to defend himself against accusations of immorality, asserting his poverty and insisting he did not deserve exclusion from the group. After two hours of defense, the group decided to let him remain among the anarchists but ruled that his views represented only himself and that he could not speak on behalf of the anarchist movement.

Martinet continued his activism. On 9 February 1885, accompanied by a few other anarchists, he traveled to Montreuil and Bagnolet, among other places, to recruit as many homeless and unemployed people as possible and send them to the Place de l'Opéra for a demonstration. He instructed them to flee when the police arrived but to return quickly if possible. He fought with the officers who came to arrest him.

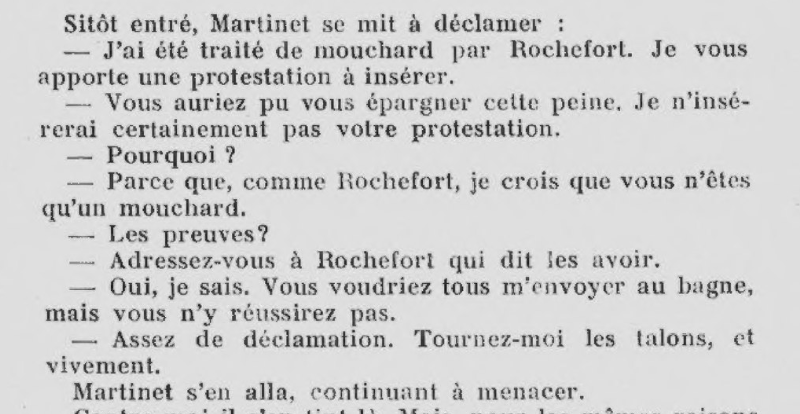
Negative depiction of Martinet by Jean Grave, where he recounts a discussion both had, presenting him as a police informant. Le mouvement libertaire sous la IIIe République, Jean Grave (1930)

On 11 February 1885, the socialist newspaper L'Intransigeant accused him of being a police informant. According to the paper, Martinet’s behavior was suspicious—his absence from anarchist dinners contrasted with his active participation in meetings during the day, and he remained free despite a surveillance order that should have confined him to Melun. The newspaper concluded that he was a provocateur protected by authorities, arrested merely to preserve his cover and explain his absence from Melun.

This characterization of Martinet as a police informant was shared by Jean Grave, with whom Martinet was in open conflict. When Martinet visited Grave to request a response in La Révolte of the accusations made by L'Intransigeant, Grave refused, stating that he agreed with Henri Rochefort, L'Intransigeant's editor, that Martinet was a 'fed'. Martinet demanded proof, and Grave retorted that he should ask Rochefort himself, before slamming the door in his face.

For this affair, Martinet was sentenced to six months in prison and five years of surveillance.

=== Lyz-lez-Lannoy case ===
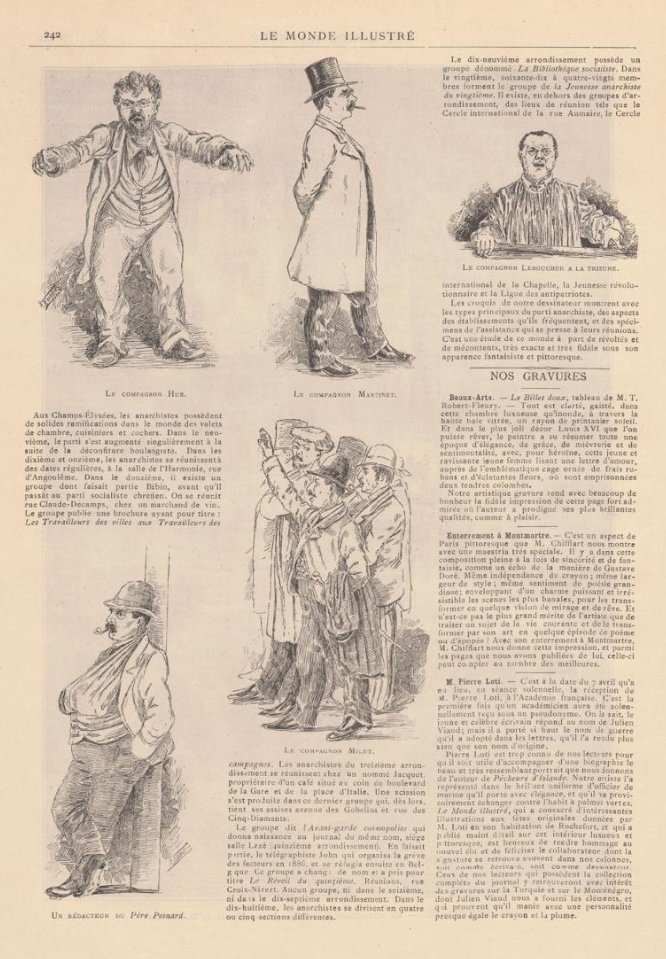
Second page of 'The anarchists in Paris' in Le Monde illustré (9 April 1892), presenting Martinet or Gustave Leboucher as leaders of the movement

Upon his release from prison, Martinet left the Île-de-France region and traveled to Belgium, from which he was swiftly expelled after insulting a mayor and denouncing white female slavery.

After his expulsion, he returned to France and settled in Roubaix. Between August 1885 and February 1886, he engaged in anarchist propaganda, producing posters and sometimes carrying them himself while working as a 'sandwich man'. He made public speeches that resonated with local workers. Martinet also wrote and published several texts, including Les infamies de la police de Roubaix ('The infamies of the Roubaix police'), Les deux complices ('The two accomplices'), and Le Pharisien et le gros porc ('The Pharisian and the fat pig').

On 28 September 1885, the bourgeois deputy Achille Scrépel organized a public meeting in Lys-lez-Lannoy to gain popular legitimacy. The assembly was open to debate, and Martinet decided to attend. He was joined by many fellow anarchists from Roubaix and local workers—altogether numbering several hundred—while the authorities had only the village constable present to oversee the discussions.

The anarchists entered the meeting and took their seats. At the start of the gathering, a speaker, prompted by Scrépel, proposed electing Scrépel as the assembly's president. The motion was put to a vote, but only sixty votes (≈20%) out of more than three hundred supported him. Approximately two hundred and fifty people (≈ 80%) opposed the proposal. A supporter of Scrépel then took the floor, was insulted, and declared that since Scrépel was organizing the meeting, he should be elected. This time, Scrépel received only thirty votes, while the syndicalist candidate supported by the anarchists, Henri Carrette, secured the rest of the votes. The republicans present tried to put the issue to a vote once more, prompting Martinet to exclaim:

This is the second time we’ve voted! Carrette will be president!

A fight then broke out on the platform, prompting the republicans to flee the room—except for Scrépel, who remained trapped at the foot of the stage. Martinet and three other companions chased him, seized a table, and cornered him between the table and the platform. Martinet raised the cane he was holding in a threatening manner, but Scrépel managed to escape amidst the chaos. The mayor of Lys attempted to enter the hall to stop the brawl, but the anarchists mistook him for the police commissaire and struck him several times in the face before he, too, fled. To avoid arrest, the anarchists formed a tight group and left the scene, heading back to Roubaix. Martinet was arrested the next day while putting up posters and was put on trial for assaulting the mayor.

While awaiting his trial, he was arrested again for the posters he had made. After being acquitted for lack of evidence in the mayor’s assault case, Martinet was arrested once more—this time for targeting the central police commissaire of Roubaix in a poster.

=== Prison and exile ===
On 29 December 1885, he was sentenced to three months in prison in Paris for evading surveillance. Martinet was acquitted in the Lyz-les-Lannoy case in January 1886. However, in February, he was sentenced in absentia in Douai to six months in prison and five years of banishment for assault and battery, among other charges. During his six months in prison, Martinet wrote a play in verse from Mazas prison, titled Chiens opportunistes ('Opportunistic dogs'), which he published on 1st of August 1886.

After being freed, he first fled to Metz with his partner, then to Switzerland, specifically Geneva. However, the Geneva anarchists were suspicious of him, having been warned by French militants to be wary of him as a possible police informant. Martinet was arrested in Annemasse while still within the appeal period; he filed an appeal and was released to wait for his trial, allowing him to cross back into Switzerland, this time settling in Lausanne.

In 1888, pursued by creditors, he left the city, was arrested in Marseille, and was sent to serve his prison sentence.

=== Return to Paris ===
After his release from prison, Martinet returned to Paris and reintegrated into the city’s anarchist circles. Taking advantage of the debates on emerging illegalism in the years 1889-1890, he began to theorize anarchist individualism and was one of the figures of the first group to self-identify in this way. For example, during the trial of anarchist Vittorio Pini, which became one of the key catalysts for the birth of illegalism—Martinet, as a friend, offered to represent him as defense counsel in the trial. The judge denied this request.

In 1890, since his companions refused to support him financially, he founded the newspaper L'Anarchie on his own. The publication, however, was doomed from the start by its limited readership and quickly disappeared. Martinet then focused on public speeches, some of which targeted the military and disciplinary battalions. In late April 1890, the anarchist attended a labor movement meeting to determine the course of action for the upcoming May 1st. The Marxists proposed organizing a peaceful demonstration, which strongly displeased the anarchists and Martinet, who protested the idea. Martinet gave a speech arguing that peaceful demonstrations were useless and distracted workers from true revolutionary struggles. He maintained that anarchists would nevertheless participate in the demonstrations, as they could still serve as 'surprise boxes' to help bring about revolution. He also opposed the idea of a general strike as a principle of action, arguing that such strikes would only distract militants from direct action.

On 27 April 1890, he went to meet Charles Malato and Ernest Gégout as they left the courtroom where they had just been sentenced to fifteen months in prison for publishing an article in their newspaper L'Attaque that contained chemical formulas for making bombs. Although they had been released, the police wanted to arrest the two anarchists again. The three men fought with the officers who came to arrest them, and Martinet was taken into custody along with his two comrades.

The anarchist was unable to hold the meeting he had planned for May 1, despite having paid a ten-franc deposit to rent the venue. However, as he was in jail, he could not open the hall, leaving the militants who had come to attend stranded outside. Quickly released after this, he organized a conference on 8 May 1890, where he spoke about universal suffrage and parliamentarianism. Admission costed fifty centimes, with the proceeds going toward the defense and support of imprisoned anarchists. He closed the conference by singing and reading poems he wrote.

In June of the same year, Martinet was present in the courtroom during the trial of the Marquis de Morès, a nationalist and antisemitic activist, who was being prosecuted for publishing antisemitic writings. When the prosecutor asked if he was the author of the document, the Marquis denied it. The prosecutor then accused him of having conspired with Pierre Martinet to print the material—prompting an outraged Martinet to stand up and call the prosecutor a liar before being forcibly removed from the courtroom.

In late July 1890, Martinet invited Théodore Garnier, an antisemitic abbé and forerunner of social Catholicism, to debate religion. Sébastien Faure joined Martinet in the discussion, though his contributions were less well-received by the audience. During the debate, Martinet argued that the Church Fathers could be considered the world's first socialists—yet he claimed they had failed to fully develop their ideas and ultimately became instruments of oppression rather than liberation.

=== 1891 and Clichy affair ===
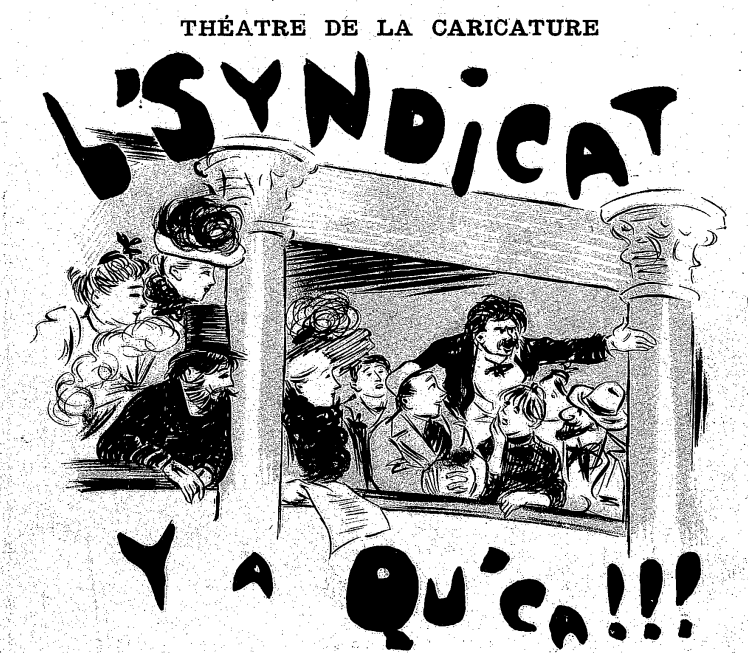
Caricature of Pierre Martinet in La Caricature for their parodic work 'L'syndicat, y'a qu'ça !' [The union, there's only that!]

Around that time, Martinet was spending time with the couple of activists Jean-Pierre François—from the Pieds plats group—and Victorine Delanoy, whom he visited every Sunday. Martinet and François were close friends.

In March 1891, he took part in an anarchist meeting in Saint-Denis as one of three scheduled speakers—Faure and Tortelier was also expected but canceled last minute. During his speech, he argued that lexicography—the science of words—was deeply shaped by bourgeois ideology, and that dictionaries should be reimagined in the future to transcend this bias.

The 1st of May 1891, as he was being raided by the police, a small group of anarchists marched toward Clichy. On their way, they encountered four policemen, leading to a confrontation. Some of the anarchists entered a nearby bar to buy something to drink. Shortly after, the police stormed the bar to seize what they considered a "seditious symbol"—a red flag carried by the group. Gunfire was exchanged. Three members of the group, Henri Decamps, Charles Dardare, and Louis Léveillé, refused to surrender and were struck with sabers. They were then taken to the Clichy police station, where they were pistol-whipped and kicked before being left without medical treatment or water. Upon learning from the press that Decamps had allegedly died from his injuries in the hospital, Martinet rushed there, intent on forcibly retrieving the body—only to be calmed down after staff assured him his friend was still alive.

On 10 May 1891, he organized a rally in honor of the victims of the Fourmies massacre - an event that had occurred on the same day as the Clichy affair nine days earlier. During this gathering, anarchists laid wreaths around the Monument à la République.

During this period, police reports on him remained uncertain about his true intentions, stating:

Consider all the brawls that have occurred in meetings over the past two years, the sometimes bloody incidents in certain newspapers, and search for the instigator. It is always Martinet who proposes, and his flock who follow him [...]. Impossible to know what this anarchist sphinx wants, whose actions and words are so often contradictory from one day to the next. In any case, if he serves someone’s interests, that person must not always be pleased.

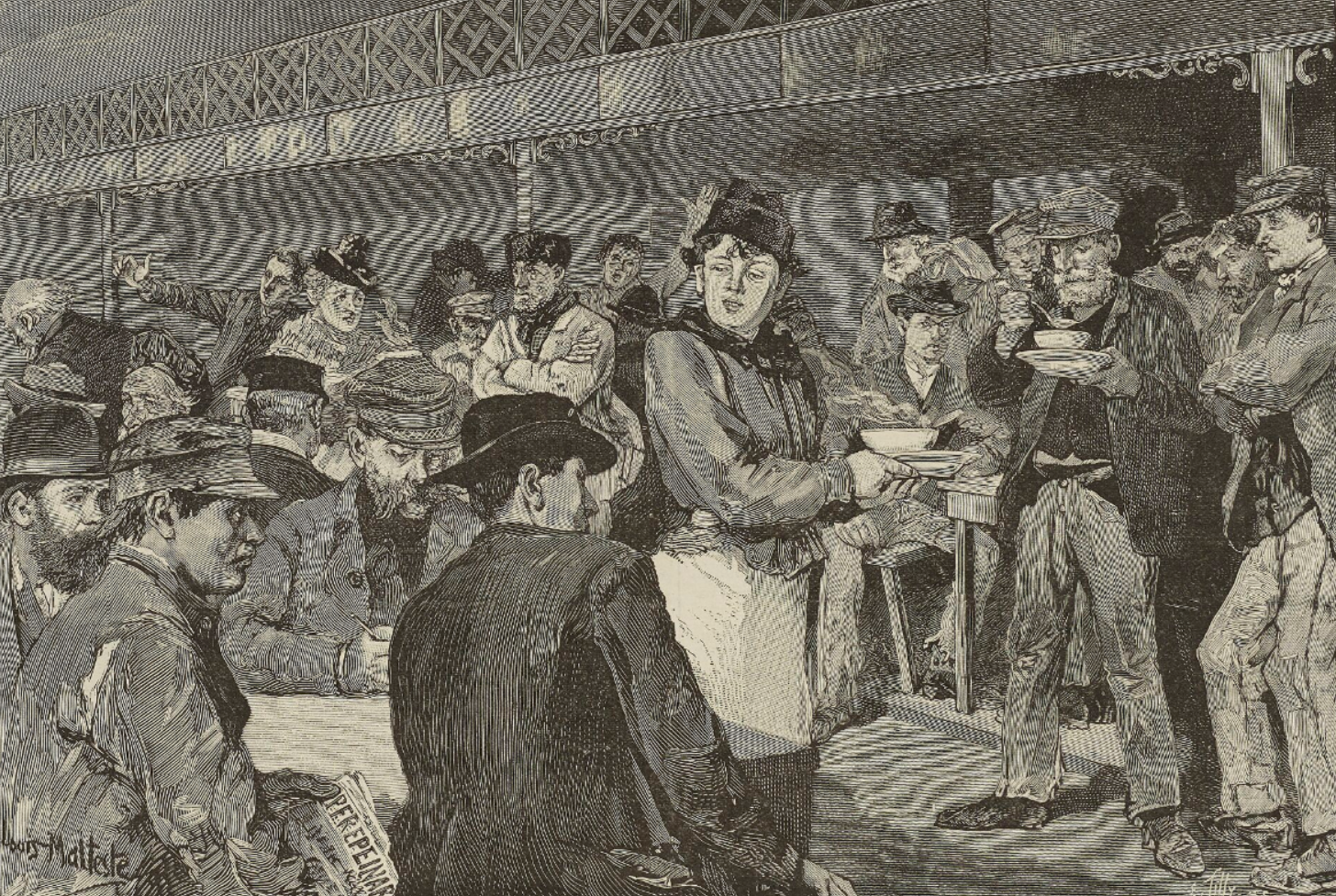
Depiction of the soup-conferences in L'Illustration (24 December 1892)

A month later, on 10 June, Martinet took part in a meeting on Boulevard Barbès alongside Faure and Gustave Leboucher. During this gathering, which also brought together socialists and other factions, he clashed with the socialist Gustave Rouanet, who had accused him of being an informant. Rouanet, then at the podium, delivered a speech claiming that socialists would never seek to undermine freedom, only to be confronted by Martinet, who demanded he repeat what he had allegedly said at the Paris municipal council—where he had called him a 'fed'. The two eventually came to blows when Martinet and other anarchists stormed the stage. Rouanet was knocked over and trampled in the chaos before quickly fleeing. Chairs were thrown across the room, shattering lamps and plunging the meeting into near-total darkness. The anarchist was then attacked by several people, who beat him in retaliation—he left the hall with a bloodied face, shouting 'Long live anarchy!' As soon as he stepped outside, he was arrested by the police and imprisoned.

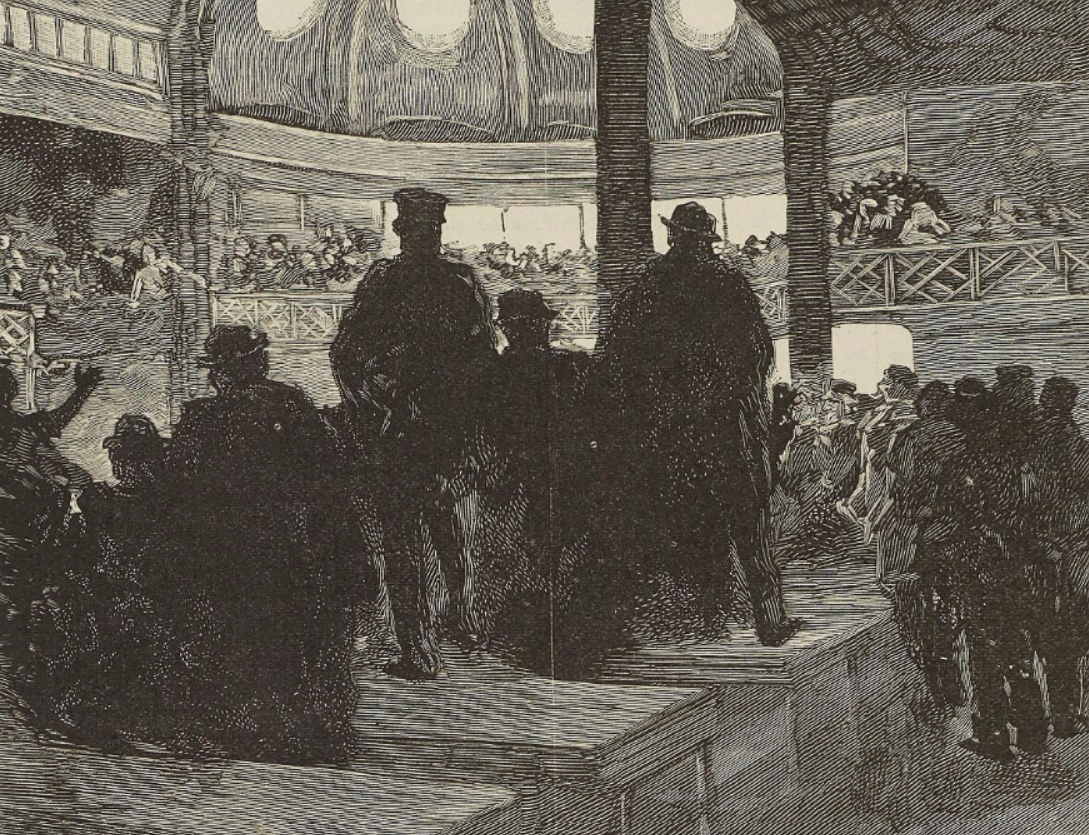
Depiction of the soup-conferences in L'Illustration (24 December 1892)

During the visit of Grand Duke Alexei Alexandrovich of Russia, who was staying at the Hôtel Continental, police security around the area was extremely tight. The anarchist appeared there with a red carnation on his lapel but merely passed by the hotel. However, he was followed by two officers who made sure he did nothing suspicious—though he instead led them on a stroll through the Tuileries Garden.

In late November 1891, he organized and funded the soup-conferences events, where companions welcomed and fed the homeless, beggars, and outcasts while delivering speeches. The first gathering drew nearly a thousand people, distributing three thousand meals and as many anarchist newspapers before he took the stage to speak. Some attendees returned for multiple servings, accounting for the disparity between the number of people and the meals handed out.

At one of these 'soup-conferences' in December 1891, he invited Séverine to attend—and she joined him.

=== Ère des attentats (1892–1894) ===
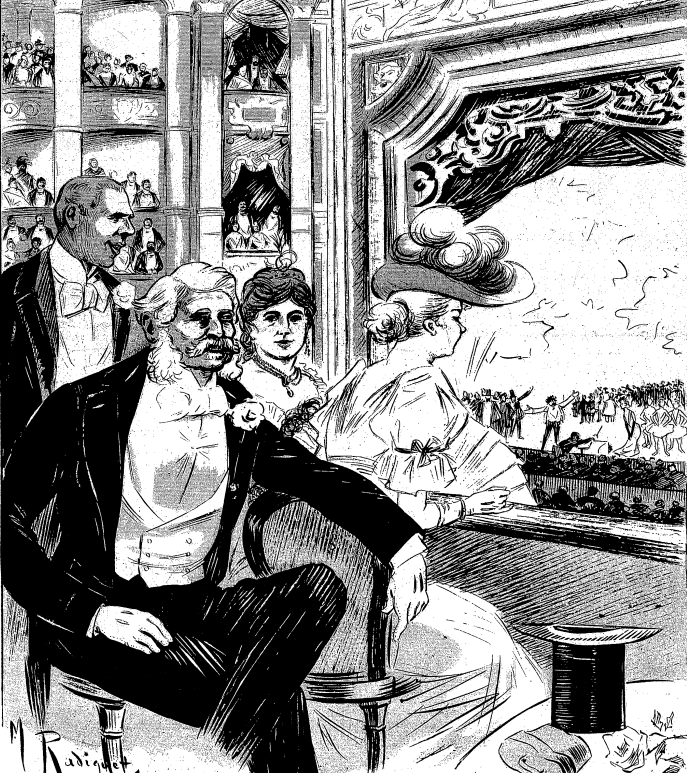
Pierre Martinet on the theater stage with Yvette Guilbert in La Caricature for their parodic work 'L'syndicat, y'a qu'ça !' [The union, there's only that!]

Early January 1892, Martinet was caught up in a legal case. In June 1891, four anarchists—Élisa Coquus, Louis Jacob, Chenal, and Mursch—had been tried for producing posters calling for military insubordination and denouncing the 'colonial army'. Though not initially charged, Martinet stood up during their audience and demanded to be prosecuted. The judge postponed the matter until his involvement could be confirmed. After further investigation, it was determined that he had indeed taken part in the action, and he was subsequently tried alongside his comrades. He cited an old law requiring judges to wear wigs in court, arguing that the tribunal was therefore incompetent to judge them.

While awaiting his trial, he was imprisoned at Sainte-Pélagie prison with Édouard Drumont, a prominent French antisemite, and Lucien Pemjean, an anarchist linked with Drumont who later became an antisemite and collaborator with the Nazis. Pemjean wrote in the collaborationist and antisemitic publication Le Pays réel in 1941 that he suspected Martinet of being an informer because he had money from unknown sources. When Drumont was released, he invited his former cellmates to dinner at his home. The anarchists who attended, including Martinet, began singing anarchist songs like the Internationale and the Red Muse, which greatly displeased and angered Drumont. The guests nearly came to blows. In 1898, Martinet had a poster put up criticizing Drumont as weak and opportunistic, accusing him of pretending to be the most radical among the anarchists only to betray those supposed positions. He also called his anarchist companions to seize him and beat him up, whenever he would come back from Algeria. He wrote about him:

As for me, I can say that there, I saved him from madness. His cell was above mine. Every night, he would knock on my ceiling with the handle of his broom, shouting to me:

— You, whose windows face the street, do you not see Jews coming to burn the jail?

— Rest assured, I replied, I see only the sentinel who watches over us.

In January 1892, Martinet and Chenal were sentenced to one year in prison, Coquus to three months, and Mursch was acquitted.

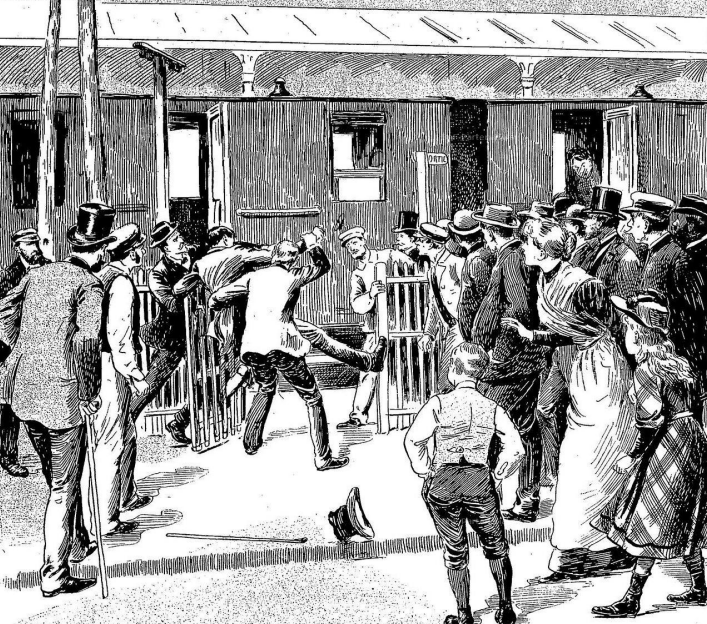
Depiction of Martinet being arrested at the Brunoy train station in L'Univers illustré (9 April 1892)

However, Martinet announced he would appeal. Some days later, accompanied by his dog, he attended the funeral of the Communard Auguste Viard, where he gave a speech. At the start of the Ère des attentats (1892–1894), he was in Brest awaiting his appeal hearing, delivering several anarchist lectures and expressing his intention to flee quickly to the United Kingdom. He also stated that he refused to turn himself in because he did not want to be separated from his dog. On 16 March 1892, Martinet left Brest, pursued by officers who tried to arrest him in Saint-Malo before he could board a ship, but he managed to evade them. Two days later, he was back in Paris and even announced his return in the press.

He remained in hiding while awaiting the appeal verdict. His partner, who attended the hearing—which upheld the original sentence—was followed by police officers on her way back to meet him. On 1 April 1892, as he went to see her at Brunoy station, he was arrested and fought with the police.

During Ravachol’s trial, Martinet wrote to him, suggesting he call upon an orator 'of our faith' to explain his ideology to the jury. Among the names Martinet proposed, in addition to himself, were Élisée Reclus and Sébastien Faure. Ravachol and his lawyer, Louis Lagasse, accepted the suggestion, but the request, though considered by the court, was ultimately denied. However, this incident highlighted the dramatic nature of the trial, where the French state was caught off guard by Ravachol’s defense. Instead of dehumanizing the terrorist as in most similar trials, the proceedings allowed Ravachol to present anarchism as a counter-ideology to the state’s doctrine.

Martinet was released from prison on 21 June 1893. On 9 December of the same year, following the National Assembly bombing, journalists approached him while he was with Laurent Tailhade. Both men expressed full support for the attack, which targeted unpopular deputies and resulted in no fatalities. Martinet penned a few verses in reaction:

| Original | English Translation |
|---|---|
| Plus on tuera Mieux ça vaudra Hardi les gars C’est germinal Qui fera pousser les semailles | The more we kill The better it will be Be brave, lads It’s germinal [i.e the revolution] That will make the seeds grow. |

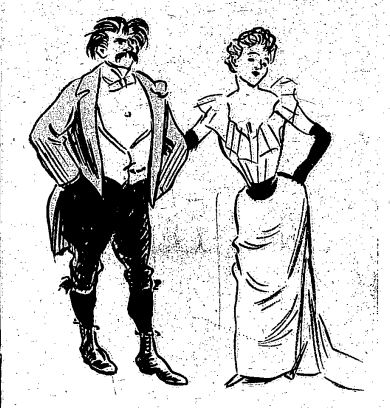
Caricature of Martinet and Yvette Guilbert in La Caricature for their parodic work 'L'syndicat, y'a qu'ça !' [The union, there's only that!]

Exiled to the United Kingdom in 1894, Martinet returned to France in 1895 and resumed his activities as an individualist anarchist militant. He founded a new newspaper, La Renaissance, which published 117 issues between late 1895 and summer 1896. In this publication, Martinet and his companions began to theorize European individualist anarchism, marking the historical point when the individualist movement truly distinguished itself from the rest of anarchism, moving away from mere criticism of anarcho-communism and establishing its own ideological autonomy.

Martinet was one of the few anarchists to openly endorse the actions of Émile Henry, seeing him as a symbol of individualist anarchism. Between 1895 and 1896, Martinet vigorously promoted illegalist theories, challenging traditional anarchist authorities like Jean Grave and Peter Kropotkin and advocating for individual reclamation—the act of stealing from bourgeois targets to redistribute the spoils.

=== Dreyfus affair ===
In 1898, in the context of the Dreyfus Affair, Martinet attended anarchist meetings, including one where he "caused a sensation" because his partner was dressed in a luxuous way. He was part of the circles surrounding the Dreyfusard Francis de Pressensé, along with the anarchists Antoine Cyvoct and Albert Libertad during that period. Furthermore, Martinet was connected to the Ligue des droits de l'homme (Human Rights League), an organization founded by Pressensé, who was then an anarchist, to oppose antisemitism and support Dreyfus.

=== End of militancy and later years ===
Progressively, Martinet ceased his militant activities, leaving his disciple Eugène Renard to become the principal theorist of individualist anarchism in France. In 1905-1906, during the law for the separation of Church and State, Martinet supported the measure and aligned himself with the socialist Aristide Briand and Georges Clemenceau. In 1906, he took advantage of a legal loophole to send a letter with a certain Robin, whom he presented as a news vendor, in which he requested permission to conduct a Catholic worship service with him in all the churches of Paris — since the law stated that two people would be sufficient to hold a ceremony, without clearly specifying how many churches were involved or if you had to be member of the clergy. However, when journalists went to the address he had provided as his own to question him, they only found an unhappy landlord who told them he would also like to find Martinet, as he owed him money.

In 1909, he played a priest in l'Embarras du choix, a play by Guillot de Saix. The following year, he played a deceived husband in Le Grand Cerf. In 1911, Martinet began writing a three-act play with Léon Michel, titled Le Droit au bonheur.

In 1918, Charles Malato wrote to Jean Grave that Martinet had become a property owner and abandoned anarchism. This observation was echoed by Les Temps nouveaux in 1920.

He died in Clermont on 6 October 1919.

== Legacy ==
Alongside Gabriel Cabot and Albert Libertad, among others, he is considered one of the leading figures of the European individualist anarchist movement. Fifteen years after his L'Anarchie, Libertad and Anna Mahé would go on to found their own L'Anarchie newspaper, becoming a famous individualist anarchist newspaper.

== Publications ==
- Les Chiens opportunistes [The Opportunistic dogs], prison of Mazas, 1885, Archives nationales de France - courtesy of Archives anarchistes.
- Manifeste électoral d'un Paria [Electoral Manifesto of a Pariah], 1885, Paris, Archives de la Préfecture de Police de Paris - Ba612 - courtesy of Archives anarchistes. Text calling for abstention and the people to arm themselves and various other points, such as the idea of an interior revolution.

=== Roubaisian period (1885) (Archives de la Préfecture de Police de Paris - Ba613 - courtesy of Archives anarchistes) ===
- Abstention - Destruction, 1885, Roubaix, a theoretical text about various subjects.

=== Roubaisian period (1885-1886) (Archives nationales de France - courtesy of Archives anarchistes) ===
- L'Avenir de l'Humanité [The Future of Humankind], 1885-1886.
- The Crime of the Fat Pig, 1885-1886.
- What the Prefect did, 1885-1886.
- The infamies of the Roubaix police, 30 January 1886.

=== Press ===
L'Anarchie (1890-1891), including, in one of the few avalaible issues :

- "Perpetual concession for a pile of shit", L'Anarchie, Paris, 21 September 1890, criticism of possibilist socialism (reformism)
- "Manufacture of artificial silk", L'Anarchie, Paris, 21 September 1890, either a bomb making manual (?) or a neutral discussion about artificial silk

La Renaissance (1895-1896), 117 issues.

=== Correspondence ===
- Letter to the press. Paris: Le Phare de la Loire. 17–19 April 1892. Letter to the press at the start of the Ère des attentats (1892-1894) where he expresses his desire to come back to Paris instead of fleing.
- Martinet, Pierre; Ravachol (21–22 April 1892). Letter to Ravachol and Ravachol's request. Paris: Gil Blas (published 26 April 1892).

=== Fragments ===
- "Anarchist Drumont", Les Droits de l'Homme, Paris, 14 January 1898. A text targeting Édouard Drumont, a pioneer of antisemitism in France. Fragments extracted by journalist L. Ravaille.

== Bibliography ==
- Badier, Walter (2010), "Émile Henry, le " Saint-Just de l'Anarchie "" [Émile Henry, the 'Saint-Just of Anarchy'], Parlement[s], vol. 14, no. 2, Paris: Revue d'histoire politique, pp. 159–171, doi:10.3917/parl.014.0159
- Bantman, Constance (2021), Jean Grave and the networks of French anarchism, 1854-1939, Palgrave Macmillan, ISBN 978-3-030-66617-0
- Bouhey, Vivien (2009), Les Anarchistes contre la République [The Anarchists against the Republic] (in French), Rennes: Presses universitaires de Rennes
- Ferragu, Gilles (2021), "En quête de rupture : de Ravachol à Émile Henry" [In quest of rupture : from Ravachol to Émile Henry], Histoire Politique (in French) (45), Paris, doi:10.4000/histoirepolitique.2169
- Grave, Jean (1930), Le Mouvement libertaire sous la IIIe République [The libertarian movement under the Third Republic] (in French), Paris: Les œuvres représentatives
- Frayne, Carl Tobias (2022), Individualist Anarchism in France and Its Legacy (PhD thesis), Cambridge: University of Cambridge, doi:10.17863/CAM.80240
- Maitron, Jean; Davranche, Guillaume (2022). "MARTINET Pierre, Paul, Désiré [dit Pol]". Dictionnaire des anarchistes (in French). Paris: Maitron/Editions de l'Atelier.
- Merriman, John M. (2016). The dynamite club: how a bombing in fin-de-siècle Paris ignited the age of modern terror. Yale University Press. ISBN 978-0-300-21792-6.

== See also ==
- Ravachol
- Propaganda of the deed
- Illegalism
- Pieds plats
