= Soup conferences =

1890s French anarchist gatherings

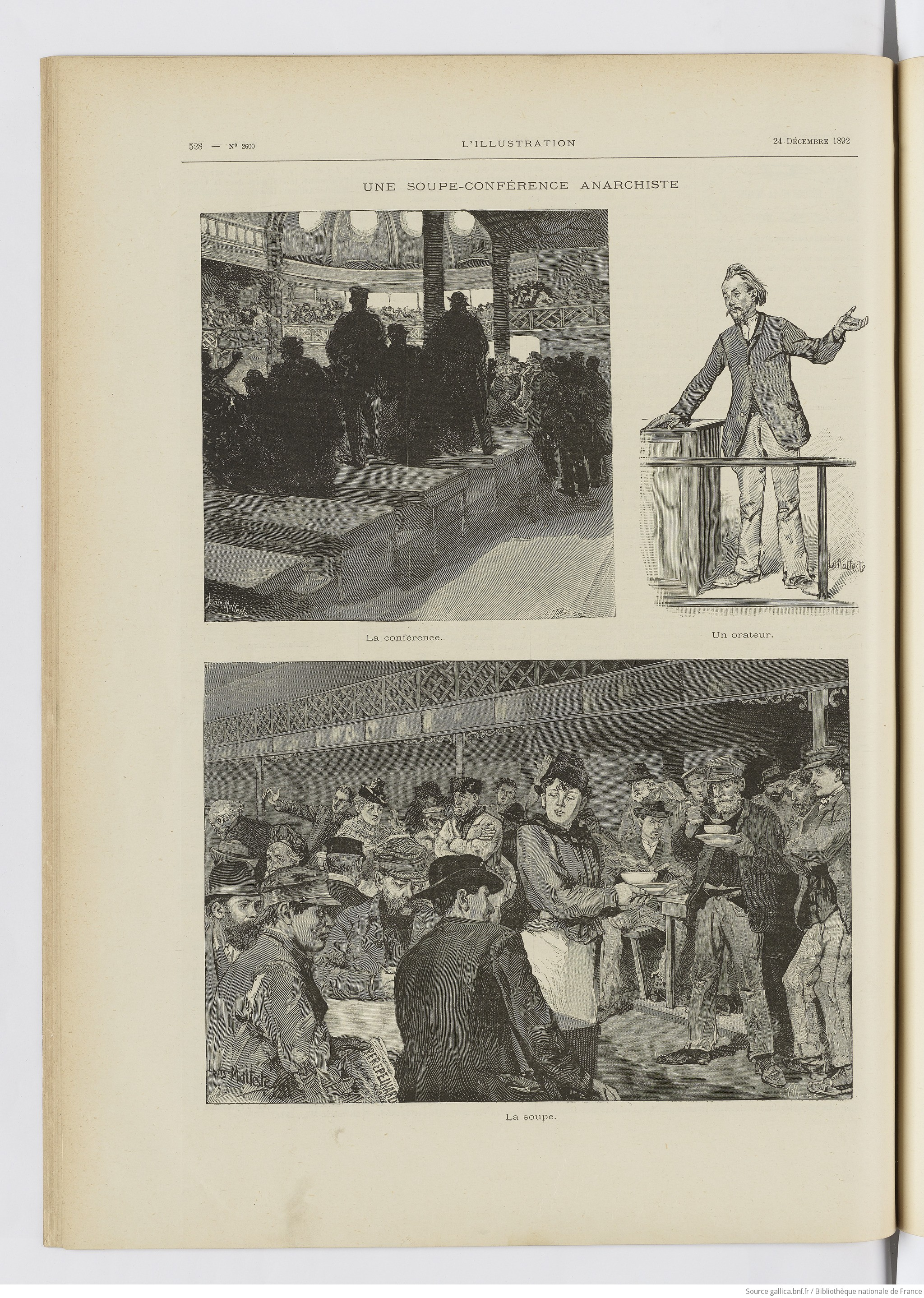
- Page 'An anarchist soup-conference' in L'Illustration (24 December 1892)
- Date: 1891-1893+
- Motive: feed the poor people Share anarchist theories and ideology
- Organized by: Anarchists; Pierre Martinet; Séverine
- Outcome: Tens of thousands (at least) of meals served.

The soup conferences were a series of individualist anarchist meetings and food distributions held at the Favier hall, 13 rue de Belleville, in Paris, during the autumns and winters of the 1890s. Based on the model of family evenings, they were conceived by Pierre Martinet in 1891 as a way to reach a poor and disadvantaged population, particularly women, the unemployed, sex workers, or criminals, and the anarchist activist Séverine quickly joined him. According to the historian Jean Maitron, they illustrate the anarchist movement’s openness to the most disadvantaged members of society. They distributed between 1,000 and 5,000 servings at each meeting.

From 1892 onwards, the soup conferences were organized by a Comité féminin, which took charge of the food management and the conferences. A notable member of this committee was Eugénie Collot. Male activists such as Jules Rousset were also involved in organizing them from this period onward. They received financial support from several artistic and intellectual figures of the time, including among others: Sarah Bernhardt, Alphonse Daudet, Émile Zola, Anatole France and Stéphane Mallarmé.

== History ==
=== Context ===
The Favier hall, located at 13 rue de Belleville, was a gathering place for the French workers' and anarchist movements. In 1890, Louise Michel organized a conference there where she opposed the 1890 Berlin Conference, denouncing it as a bourgeois manipulation to enslave the proletariat.

=== Soup conferences at Favier hall ===
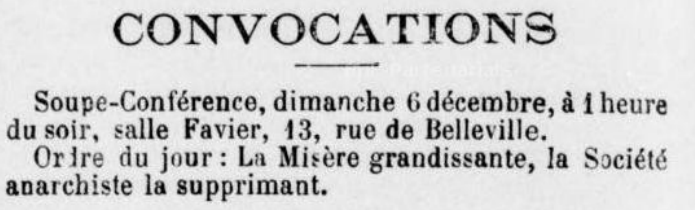
Convocation to the soup conferences in La Révolte (6 December 1892)

Those gatherings were closely linked with the life of the individualist anarchist tendency within anarchism. In November 1891, Pierre Martinet began organizing these lectures. He started by arranging paid talks aimed at a wealthier audience and used the proceeds from these events to fund the soup conferences, where he planned and promised to distribute 4,000 bowls of soup. Despite his ambitious project, he only raised a modest amount and had to provide the remaining funds himself, which he did. Martinet sought to invite poor people, women, and sex workers, as reflected in his appeal:

To the vagrants, to the beggars, to the ex-convicts, to those labeled as pimps, to the women insulted with the name of 'public women,' to all the wretched, to all the suffering.

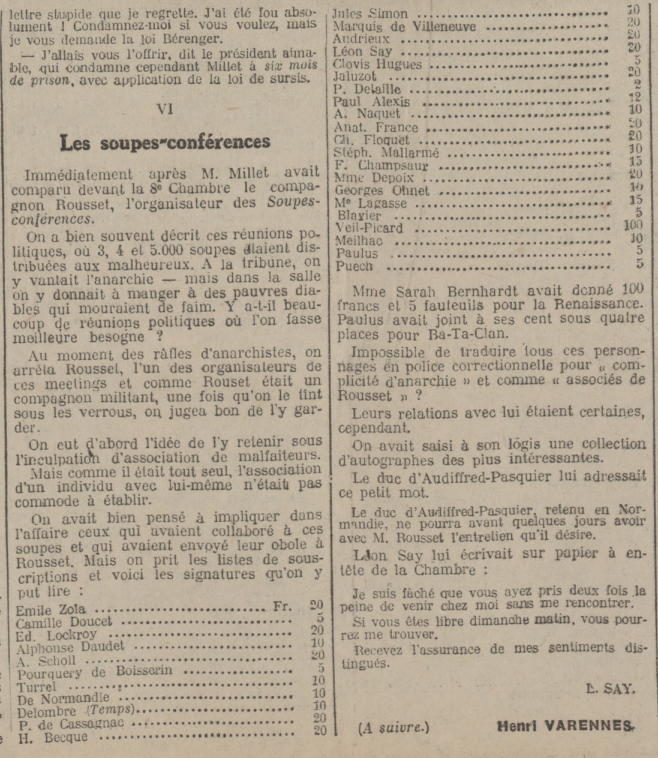
Henri Varenne's article on the soup conferences in Le Libertaire, giving the list of the main financial backers of the events.

He spoke the following day at the first soup conference on 15 November 1891. The event drew around a thousand people, mostly poor, who came to be served, and distributed more than three thousand meals and as many anarchist newspapers, as some people returned for seconds. About a dozen "companions, both men and women", served the crowd, with the women wearing white aprons and the men rolling up their shirt sleeves. Séverine joined the organization of the soup conferences the following month, in December 1891, because she wanted to support her comrades. Le Père Peinard described her in very positive terms in that context. On the eve of these gatherings, anarchists went to makeshift dormitories, cafés, and night shelters around the Paris region to invite the people staying there to attend the next day.

From the following year, the organization of the soup conferences was managed by a Comité féminin, not to be confused with the later anarchist group also called the Comité féminin. This committee included activists such as Livernois, Piffet, Dupont, Job, Petitjean, and Eugénie Collot, according to Dominique Petit in Le Maitron. Collot left the organization of the soup conferences the following year, in 1893.

Male militants still participated in the organization of the soup conferences, such as Jules Rousset, who set up a number of these events in 1892. He was supported in these efforts by Alphonse Daudet, Émile Zola, Adrien Scholl, Clovis Hugues, Henri Becque, Paul de Cassagnac, Léon Say, Maurice Barrès, Édouard Detaille, Stéphane Mallarmé, Félicien Champsaur, Georges Olmet, Meilhac, Mr. Veil-Picard, Paulus, Anatole France, Louis Lagasse, and Sarah Bernhardt. He was particularly well received by Bernhardt, who gave him 100 francs and four tickets to attend her play The Kings. When Rousset presented himself at Mallarmé's house, Mallarmé was not there. Instead, he sent Rousset this note along with some money:

I have regretted a thousand times that I was not at home when you came to visit. Will you accept the gift of a man who is not wealthy?
Heartfelt support for your work.

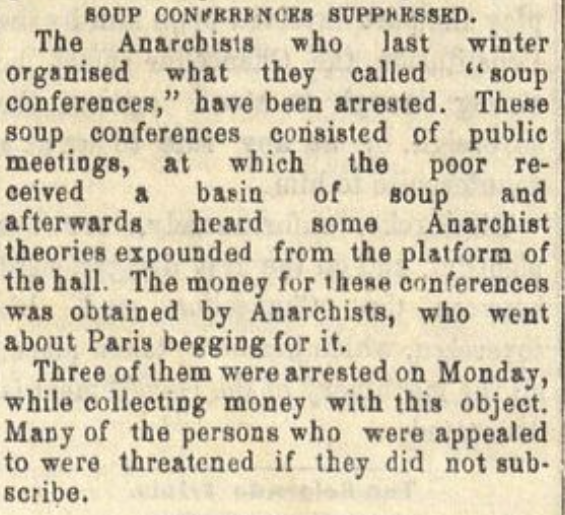
'Zola and the anarchist : the soup conferences suppressed' in The New York Herald, discussing the suppression of the soup conferences

After the National Assembly bombing and during the repression of January and February 1894, Rousset was arrested and initially accused of “criminal conspiracy”. However, when the authorities realized the extent of the funding, which came from a significant part of the French intellectual and artistic world at the time, they stopped pursuing him for that charge — as it would have forced them to arrest the artists themselves. Instead, he was prosecuted for fraud and begging, because he had not used the collected funds for new soup conferences. Rousset defended himself by stating that he had not spent the money, had fed up to 5,000 people by soup conference in 1891 and 1892, but that the 400 francs raised would have been insufficient at that time to organize such an event again yet. Nonetheless, the anarchist was sentenced to six months in prison for breach of trust, a decision that Le Petit Journal later described as incomprehensible when it revisited the event in 1936.

During this period, the soup conferences as a whole were targeted, other anarchists were arrested, and the events were temporarily suspended.

== Legacy ==
The historian of the French anarchist movement, Jean Maitron, used the example of the soup conferences to illustrate the anarchist movement’s openness to the “marginalized elements” of society — a point he noted in contrast to the Marxists, an opposing ideological movement that criticized the anarchists for these political choices.

== See also ==
- Family evenings
- Food Not Bombs
- Soup kitchen

== Bibliography ==
- Tardif, Marie-Pier (2021), Ni ménagères, ni courtisanes. Les femmes de lettres dans la presse anarchiste française (1885-1905) (PhD thesis) [Neither housewives nor courtesans. Women writers in the French anarchist press (1885-1905)] (PDF)
