= Anarchist companionship =

Relationship system of the anarchist movement

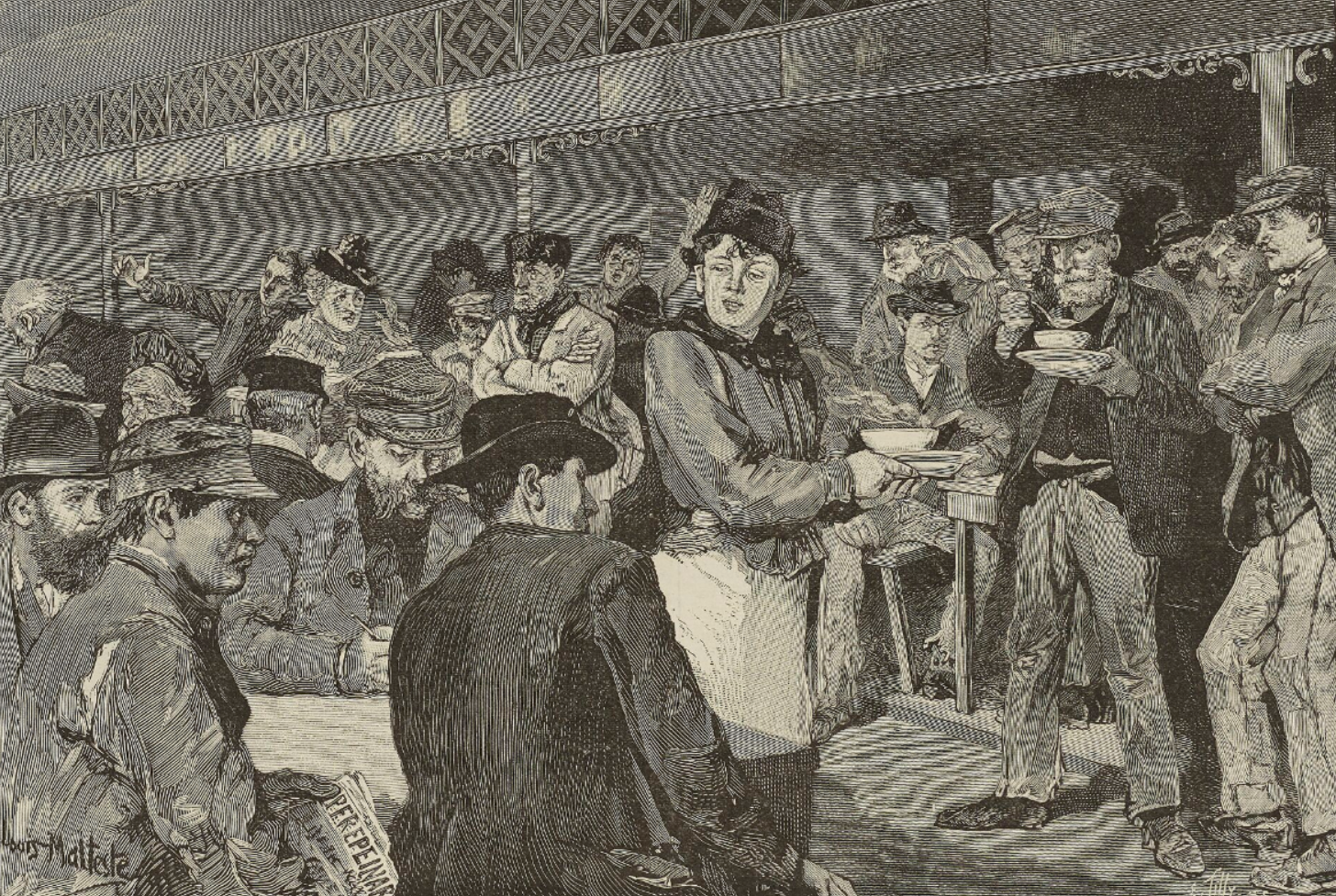
- Depiction of the anarchist soup-conferences in L'Illustration (24 December 1892)
- Founded: Late 1880s (?) (terminology used since Bakunin)
- Preceded by: Black International
- Succeeded by: Revolutionary syndicalist unions (precursor of anarcho-syndicalism); Still functioning under different forms (?)
- Ideology: Anarchism
- Political position: Far-left
- International affiliation: At least Western Europe, Latin America and Africa (terminology more prevalent in Romance-speaking countries)

The anarchist companionship is the relationship system of the anarchist movement in Western Europe and a part of the world from the end of the 19th century onwards, encompassing both formal and informal anarchist networks guided by shared values such as hospitality and financial or practical aid to fellow companions. These networks also engaged in supporting other social struggles of the period, even those that were not explicitly anarchist.

This transnational network, lacking a real nerve center or central authority, allowed anarchists of the time to meet, consult, and undertake joint actions while providing them with significant mobility across Europe. The companions shared a set of structuring elements that united them: common values, a shared commitment to the anarchist struggle, and a collective imaginary, particularly shaped by the anarchist press and songs of the period.

Born as a response to state repression in Europe, this shifting and decentralized network proved difficult for authorities to control. They portrayed it as the result of a vast international anarchist conspiracy and as a new Black International (1881–1887), an interpretation that does not reflect the reality of anarchist companionship. Attempts to suppress it generally failed due to its elusive nature.

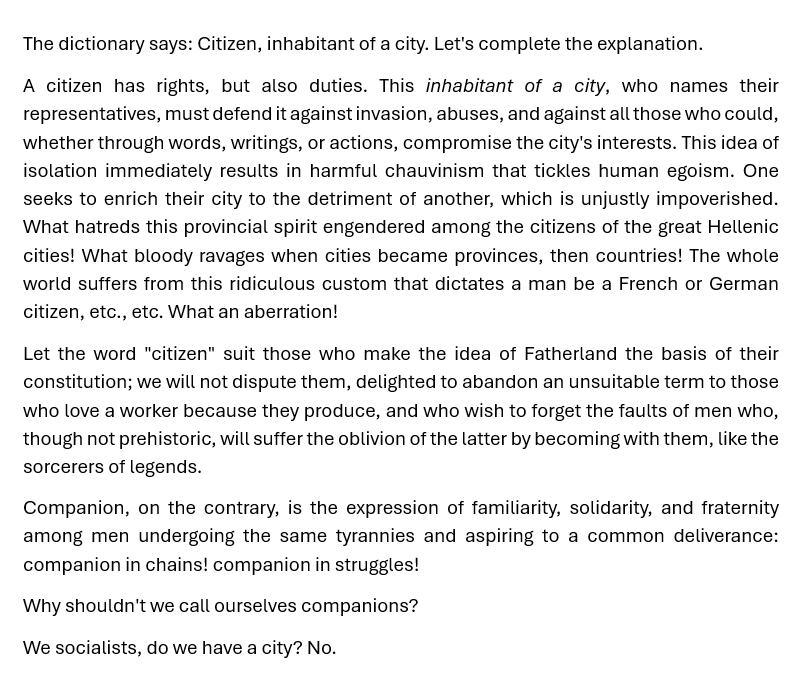
English translation of parts of the 'Citizen or Companion' article in La Révolution Cosmopolite (1887)

After the Ère des attentats (1892–1894) and the growing distinction between individualist anarchists and anarcho-communists, anarchists turned to other forms of action and coordination, particularly anarcho-syndicalism. Although anarchist companionship evolved and took on new forms, strong markers remain, including the terms 'companion' or 'friend', making it an anarchist counterpart to the more communist-linked term of 'comrade'.

== Terminology ==
The term companion literally means 'bread fellow, messmate'. The term replaced citizen among anarchists in France in the early 1880s for several reasons, some of which were noted by the Boulangist newspaper La Cocarde in 1888:

A few words about this epithet companion, which anarchists use to refer to one another. Citizen was the republican word, I would even say the revolutionary one. But citizen implied a right of citizenship (civitas, civis), a contract agreed upon with a governing power: citizen suited only slaves, from an anarchist perspective. Something else had to be found. They created the term companion, which, in fact, carried no obligations.

== Anarchist companionship ==
Towns serving as relay points and contact hubs for companions along the Franco-Swiss-Italian border.

=== Typology of companionship ===
During this period, companions were generally men, although women could also be part of the movement. Contrary to the view upheld in earlier historiography of the movement, companions were not necessarily young, celibate men. In the French Nord department, for instance, among male companions, 67% were between 20 and 35 years old, 27.7% were over 35, and only 4.8% were under 20, which presents the image of a movement primarily composed of militants in their 'age prime'. Moreover, police reports on companions indicate a relatively equal number of married and single men, without accounting for free unions or cohabitation, which also existed.

In France, a certain number of companions were foreigners, mainly Italians, Russians, Polish, Belgians, Spanish, or British people. However, sources on them are difficult to analyze, as they belonged to circles that were challenging for the French authorities to infiltrate, making precise details hard to determine. From a socio-economic perspective, companions were predominantly involved in manual work, but far from all of them were artisans. Additionally, their professions varied greatly depending on location, while one city might have a majority of artisans, another might have mostly factory workers, making the composition of the movement quite diverse.

Among the various types of anarchists of this period, Bouhey identifies, for example, the gyrovague anarchists, characterized by great mobility and a deep penetration of the (at least European) territory through their travels and contacts; these allowed them to serve as 'liaison agents' within the companionship and thus helped to unify the movement's action and thought.

=== General principles and practices ===
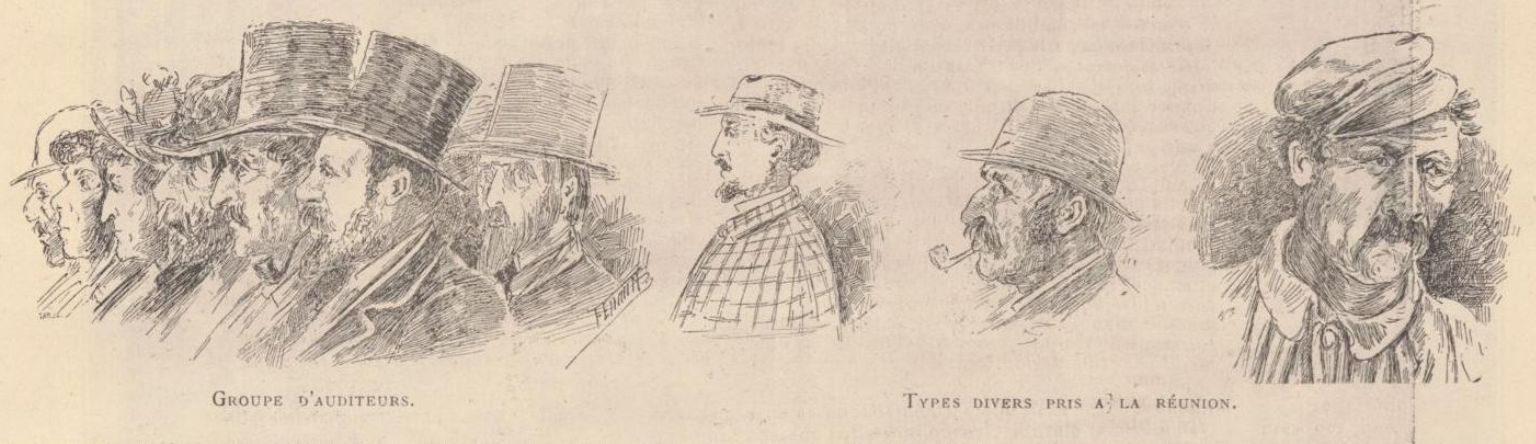
'Anarchist types' in Le Monde illustré (9 April 1892)

The term companion gave its name to anarchist companionship, the structural network of the anarchist movement in Western Europe at the end of the 19th century. This network, composed of anarchists who self-identified as companions, had no real nerve center. However, contrary to what La Cocarde claimed, describing it as carrying no obligations, being a companion actually entailed a series of duties toward others. First and foremost, being a companion meant being socialized among anarchists. This socialization primarily took place through meals and dinners organized by certain groups. These gatherings allowed anarchists to meet, introduce one another, coordinate, assess the reliability of different individuals, in short, they helped unify the movement.

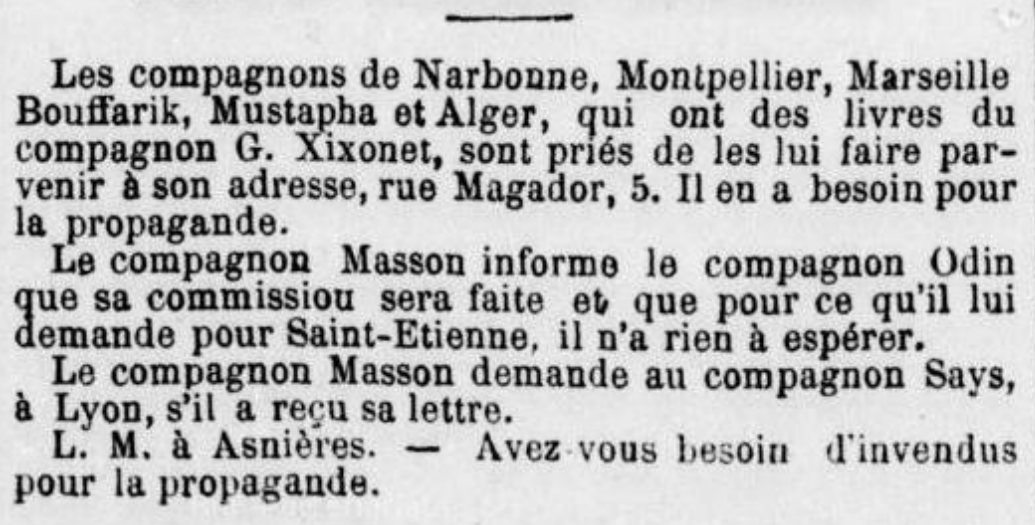
Coordination of anarchist companions in La Révolte (25 January 1890)

The duties of companions were quite demanding. Firstly, they were expected to demonstrate total hospitality toward fellow companions and, in some cases, toward those in need. This hospitality extended beyond simply offering food and shelter to passing anarchists; it also involved hiding and assisting individuals sought by the authorities, helping them evade capture. In some cases, hospitality even went as far as helping the hosted companion find employment.

Furthermore, companions provided financial assistance to one another. They organized fundraising efforts to support imprisoned companions or those in financial distress. In these fund collections, such as the case of companion Faure and her children, who received financial support from the anarchist movement when her husband was imprisoned, distance was not an obstacle. Parisian companions, for example, could organize fundraising efforts for companions located across France or even in other countries.

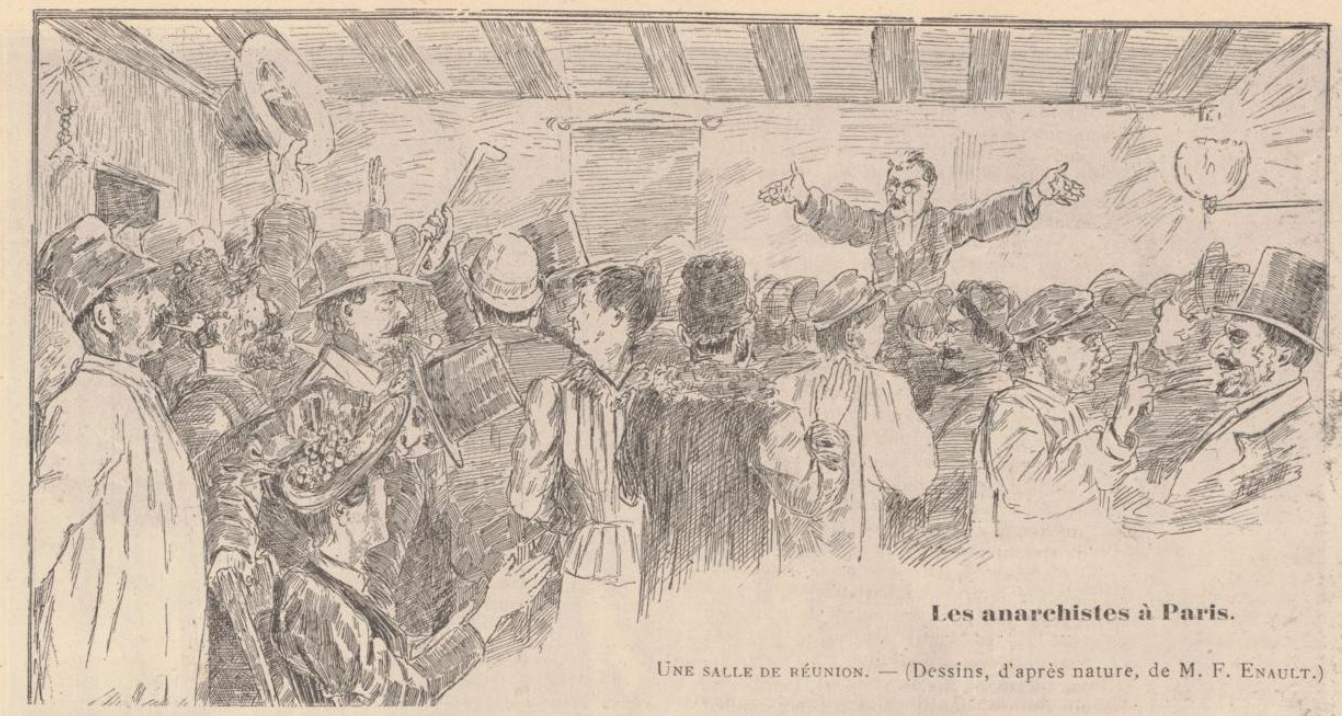
Depiction of an anarchist meeting in Le Monde illustré (9 April 1892)

As state repression increased, groups of companions became increasingly closed off, to guard against police informants, any newcomer to a group was closely monitored for a period of time by the companions. This included following the individuals or comparing the declared and actual financial resources of a given individual. If the information uncovered raised suspicions about someone, they could be publicly accused during a meeting and confronted by others, potentially leading to their exclusion from the movement. Such use of non-state intelligence was noted by state intelligence services, who wrote in France, for example:

Anarchist groups appear to be open to everyone, but each member, once admitted, is carefully scrutinised. They are treated with suspicion until their exact position is known, including the workplace, their resources, and expenses. If their life is regular, all is well. If they spend a lot, they are observed to determine whether their expenses exceed their income. In such a case, they must justify their resources. If they cannot, they are quietly expelled. Several members have already been expelled in this manner.

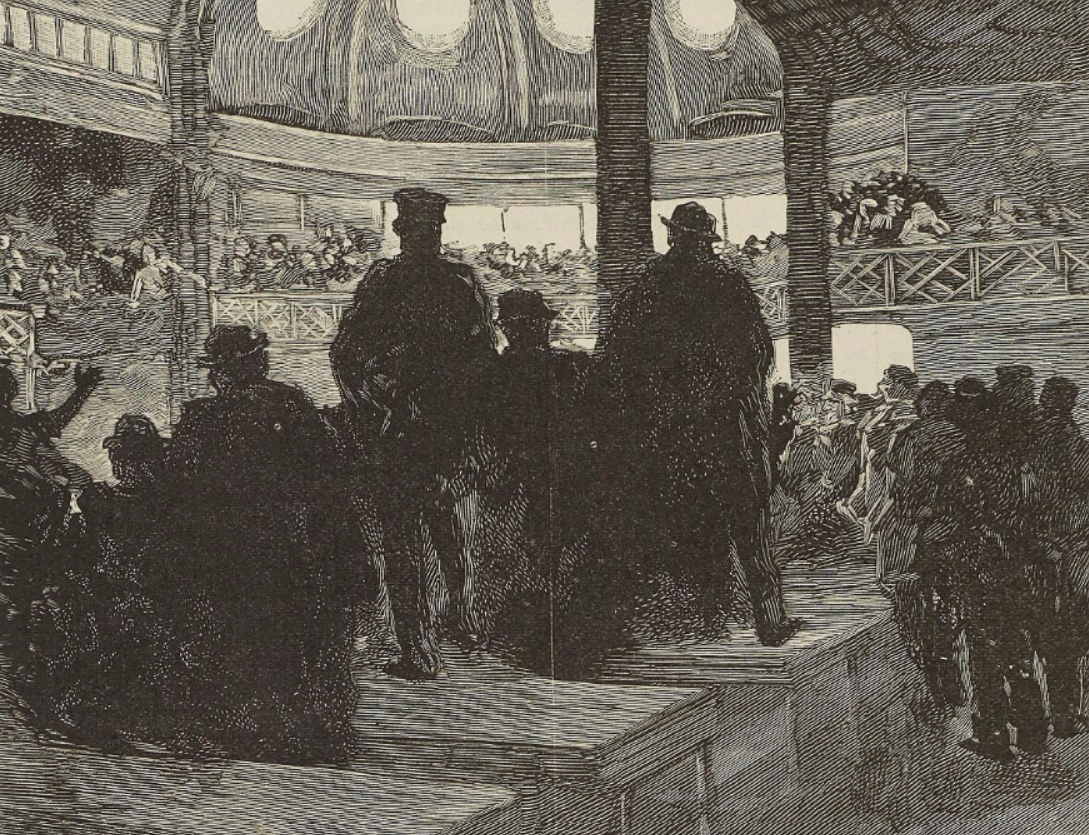
Depiction of the anarchist Favier soup-conferences in L'Illustration (24 December 1892)

The companions also helped each other carry out actions. For example, Sante Geronimo Caserio, an Italian companion who did not speak a word of French, arrived in Lyon with the plan to assassinate Sadi Carnot, who was responsible for major repressions against the anarchist movement. Unfamiliar with the city, he met some companions and was placed along Carnot's route, at the precise location where the assassination could take place. Bouhey considers this a likely example of mutual aid among companions, even between militants from different countries who did not speak the same language.

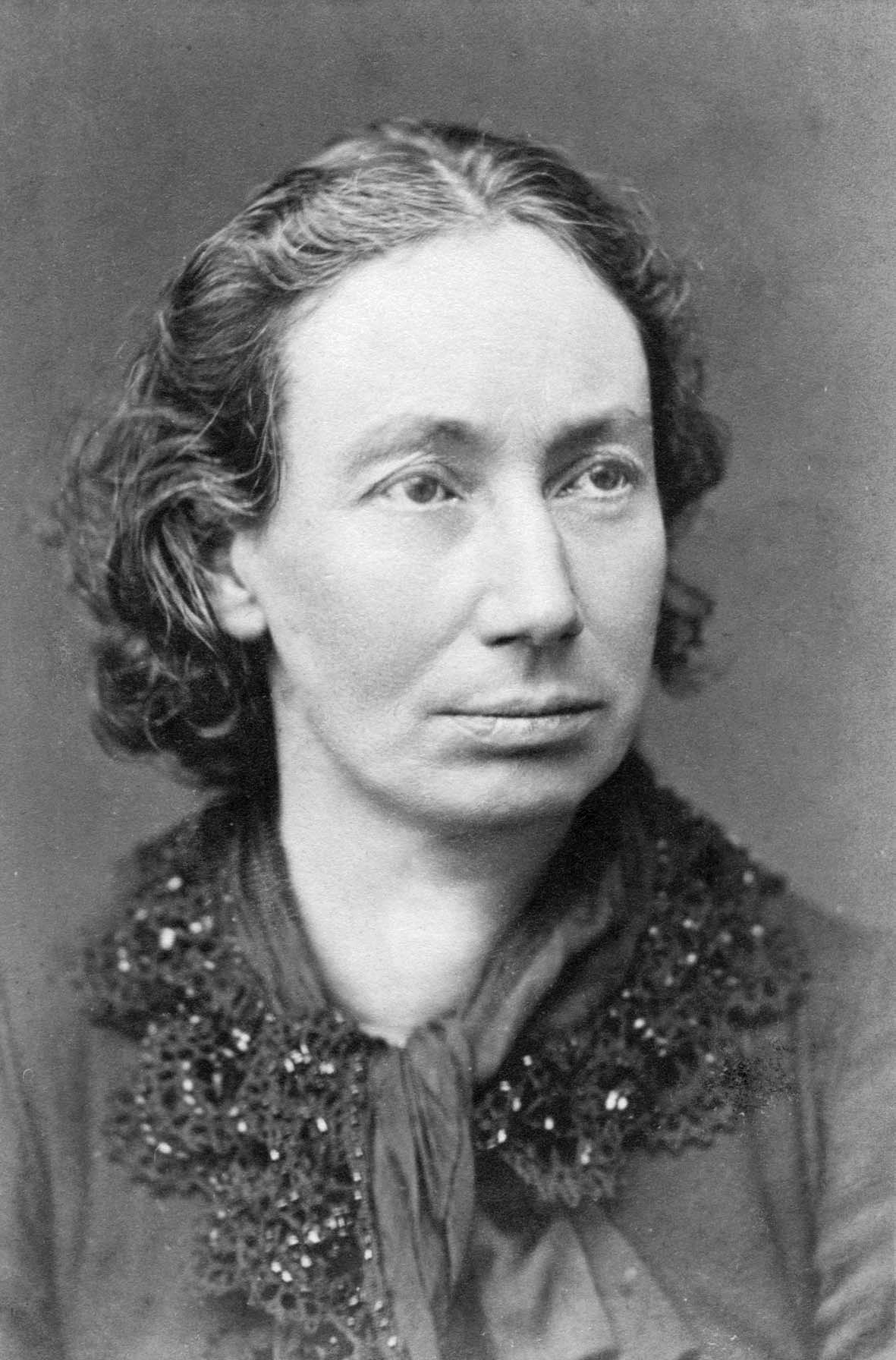
Louise Michel, a famous French companion, 1880.

The companionship system could be used for terrorism, as in this case, but the actions carried out by companions were highly diverse. They included political propaganda, organizing public readings for illiterate militants or those seeking education, and holding public meetings to promote their cause. Companions could also coordinate public disturbances or engage in individual reclamation, stealing property from bourgeois targets to redistribute it. For instance, Louise Michel was accused of organizing, alongside her companions, the looting of Parisian bakeries in 1883. She allegedly used these networks to meet and encourage other anarchists to help her incite a popular uprising, aiming to seize bakeries in protest against the high price of bread.

Finally, companions were generally well integrated into the social struggles of their time, to which they attached great importance. However, their stance toward the workers' movement was ambiguous, as they saw strikes, political parties, and even unions as, at best, useless. Nevertheless, they believed they had to take part in these struggles despite their reservations, and companions sometimes supported broader non-anarchist causes.

Despite these duties, companions could be tolerant toward one another and their practical compromises with capitalism. In that regard, Faure wrote:

Of course, the concessions they make to the bourgeois environment, to capitalist society, and too often to legality, are not presented by anarchists as acts of 'anarchist realization'; they acknowledge them for what they are: individual expedients, necessary evils. They do not take them seriously. It does not matter whether the anarchist companion has agreed to work for an employer, to enter into a legal marriage, or to write for a newspaper that complies with legal deposit requirements, the essential thing is that they fight relentlessly against the capitalist system, openly practice free love, and write whatever they think.

=== Territorial carving, 'leaders', and results ===
The anarchist movement was structured around a carving of territory, with groups carving out local areas without regard for administrative distinctions or national borders. This was a multi-layered carving, as groups sometimes overlapped in the same geographical space. For example, some official groups dedicated to propaganda were connected to clandestine and semi-clandestine groups in the same areas. This allowed the companions to engage in local actions that aligned with anarchist theories, creating numerous hubs of anarchism. As a result, many cities were affected by the movement, and a relatively significant portion of the population became politicized and joined.

Cities touched by the repression of early 1894 - testimony of the anarchist presence in France

Within these groups were individuals who formed an "elite" or could be considered the "leaders" of a particular group. This title did not imply they were politicians in the usual sense. Instead, they remained the driving forces of their groups only as long as the other companions who made up the group allowed them that space and granted them their trust. Such a position could be quickly lost and depended on what each person could or wanted to contribute to the movement. Vivien Bouhey wrote about them:

In a movement that wants to be egalitarian and anti-authoritarian, these leaders, or cadres, distinguish themselves from other militants through various factors such as human and moral qualities, specific aptitudes, or other resources they can offer their companions in the struggle. These attributes are put at the service of anarchist ideas. As long as they are recognized as beneficial to the movement by a portion of the companions and as long as the leader does not appear to betray their shared ideas, they are legitimized in their status as a leader, and this allows them to play a more or less 'key' role within the movement (writer, lecturer, group organizer, gang leader, etc.). Thus, some of them provide the main impetus, an impetus that ignores borders, for propaganda, particularly by defining strategies in what historians of the movement call 'poles,' 'epicenters,' 'capitals,' 'headquarters,' 'rear bases,' or 'forward bases' (such as Geneva, Paris, or London, depending on the period), strategies that often end up 'imposing themselves' on the militants.

During the first generation of militants, those 'leaders' or 'figures' tried to ensure the movement's survival by recruiting people from diverse sociological backgrounds, including foreigners and workers. This strategy was quite successful, and the number of anarchists in France, for instance, grew continuously until the end of the Ère des attentats and the lois scélérates in 1894, even doubling in the early 1890s.

=== Repression and the anarchist terrorist conspiracy? ===
The companionship system, which was by nature relatively clandestine and outside state control, became a target for Western authorities, who sought to dismantle it. To achieve this, political authorities framed anarchists as part of a vast transnational conspiracy. The French police and press claimed that anarchists were preparing a generalized plot of attacks from London, which was not true. While London did serve as a safe haven for some anarchists, offering refuge and support, there was no centralized coordination of terrorist activities. Furthermore, the French police became highly alarmed, falling into a state of collective paranoia regarding London-based anarchists, many of whom did not even support terrorism or propaganda of the deed.

The authorities were caught off guard by the existence of political and moral agreements uniting anarchist companions, which they attributed to the influence of propagandists and attempted to oppose by criminalising them. Thus, in France, the first loi scélérate (villainous law) of 18 December 1893, which redefined the concept of criminal associations in French law while claiming to combat these agreements preventively, targeted this system but failed to hinder companionship because it was based on a legal framework ill-suited to this new reality. It also did not adequately define the various characteristics of anarchist companionship, according to a jurist of the time regarding the government's failure in the Trial of the Thirty. The jurors refused to believe in associations between people who had never met and refrained from convicting most of the accused; "since anarchist companionship was neither an association nor a conspiracy, the legislator should not have applied the old forms of conspiracy to it".

=== Structuring elements ===
==== Shared symbols and references ====
Although the companionship network was loose and lacked central authority, companions generally shared a common worldview. First and foremost, they used the same symbols and historical references. The history of the working class and the repression against labor movements were key structuring elements, as anarchists integrated and reclaimed these memories. Events such as the Semaine sanglante ('Bloody Week') or other massacres like the Haymarket Square massacre became crucial shared historical references. Additionally, some symbols became widely adopted among companions, most notably the black flag.

==== Shared worldview ====
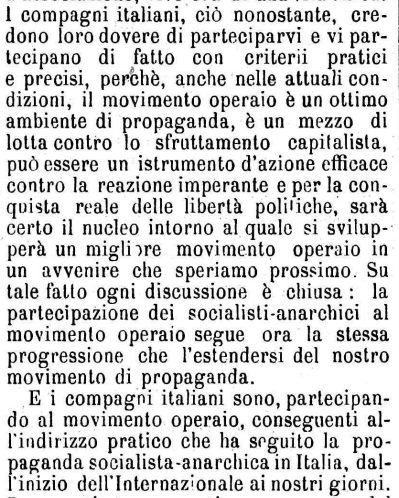
Article in Il Risveglio socialista-anarchico highlighting the growing integration of anarchist companions within the syndicalist movement (21 July 1900)

By borrowing symbols from the labour movement, anarchists reinterpreted them to differentiate themselves from socialists. Furthermore, the emergence of anarchist art, particularly anarchist songs, helped spread their ideals and deeply influenced the movement. Anarchist press also played a unifying role, providing companions with similar perspectives on the world. These perspectives often depicted their society as profoundly violent and unequal, with a stark opposition between oppressors and the oppressed, engaged in a struggle to the death.

==== Diverse but unified theories and end ====
In terms of theory, companions followed various ideological perspectives, leading to major internal debates. However, despite these differences, companions, especially in the 1880s, saw themselves as part of a single movement. At first, this diversity of opinions did not significantly impact the unity of the companionship network. However, by the mid-1890s, the Ère des attentats (1892–1894) and the growing divide between individualist anarchists and anarcho-communists led to fractures within companionship. This shift ultimately resulted in the rise of new organizational forms, such as anarcho-syndicalism.

== Legacy ==
=== Survivances and memorial posterity among anarchists ===
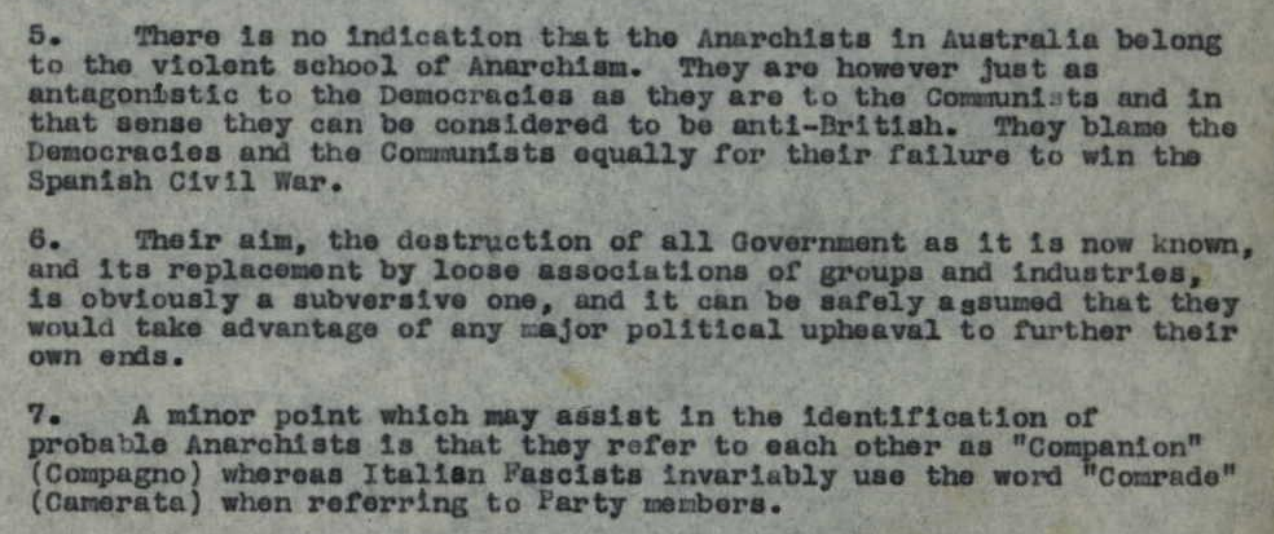
Report by Australian authorities on the anarchist movement, mentioning the continued use of 'companion' by Italian anarchists entering the country (1942)

While the companionship evolved to give way to other structures or different forms of organization added to it, the term 'companion' continues to be used by some anarchists, who prefer it over 'comrade', a term more closely associated with communism. In his thesis on individualist anarchism in France, presented at the University of Cambridge, Carl Frayne revisits the importance of the term companion and the historical memory of the companionship period for anarchists, at least up to the present day in France; he describes the anarchist movement at the beginning of the twenty-first century as follows:

Anarchists’ political engagement is rooted in a specific history and culture. The anarchist identity is made up of inherited core values and theoretical corpora, symbols and myths, songs and iconography, martyrs and heroes, literary works and journals, as well as a particular sense of camaraderie and forms of association. It is, in short, everything that makes up the lives, memories, and visions of those who come together as self-identified anarchists. Preserving and passing down this identity to new generations is considered crucial to keeping the movement alive in the long term. [...] Anarchists cultivate a sense of fascination for the heyday of the movement in the late nineteenth and early twentieth centuries. Revolutionary discourse, the black flag, songs dating back to the nineteenth century, and the use of the term 'compagnon' are instances of the cultural elements that constitute this collective consciousness and memory. Anarchists are those upholding a specific cultural heritage, which shapes the rêverie libertaire.

=== Criticism and historiographical debates ===
Anarchist companionship in France was primarily studied by Vivien Bouhey in his work Les Anarchistes contre la République ('The Anarchists against the Republic'), where he highlighted these networks and raised many interesting points, but tended to rely heavily on police sources, which were therefore not very objective. He tended to present companionship as a well-established "organization", thus following, at least to some extent, the mistaken police narrative of the time regarding it. Simon Luck, who specializes in the sociology of political organizations, criticizes these perspectives and prefers instead the idea of "coordination, of networks of solidarity and mutual aid, rather than organization".

In the context of historiographical debates regarding his positions, which were partly criticized by Marianne Enckell for relying too heavily on police sources, Bouhey published an article in 2019 where he responded that he never supported a centralized organization of the movement. Instead, he believes the anarchist movement of this period can be viewed from the perspective of a 'weak International'. He writes:

In our view, through the sole prism of French sources, it does not seem unreasonable to consider that the movement's leaders, in touch with a gradually expanding militant base, were able to build an original international, at least during the years 1881-1894. This was based on the struggles of the 1870s and subsequently within the framework of the very harsh repression they suffered in different countries, starting with Switzerland. It was a 'weak' international in that it was not formalized and did not function through institutional mechanisms, with the internationalization of the movement resulting from anarchist theories. It covered a discontinuous and evolving space. It did not exist thanks to parties (in the modern sense of the term) but thanks to French and foreign companions, some of whom, in 'epicenters' of the movement like Paris and then London, played a driving role in terms of propaganda, relayed by leaders at the regional or local level. These companions shared a strong identity, cooperated more than they acted alone, were mutually supportive, and for the most part trusted, or wanted to trust, a relatively well-identified strategy to trigger the revolution. They exchanged ideas within a space that was not one of dogma and still shared a common horizon, indeed waiting for the coming revolution to give birth to a communist world.

== Bibliography ==
- Bantman, Constance (2014), "« Anarchistes de la bombe, anarchistes de l'idée » : les anarchistes français à Londres, 1880-1895" ['Bomb anarchists, idea anarchists': French anarchists in London, 1880-1895], Le Mouvement Social, 246 (1), Paris: 47–61, doi:10.3917/lms.246.0047
- Berthoud, Joël (1969). L'attentat contre Carnot et ses rapports avec le mouvement anarchiste des années 90 (mémoire) [The attack on Carnot and it's relationship with the anarchist movement of the 1890s (memory)] (PDF) (in French).
- Bouhey, Vivien (2009), Les Anarchistes contre la République [The Anarchists against the Republic], Rennes: Presses universitaires de Rennes (PUR)
- Chambost, Anne-Sophie (2017), "« Nous ferons de notre pire… ». Anarchie, illégalisme … et lois scélérates" [«We’ll Do our Worse». Anarchy, Illegalism … and Evil Law], Droit et Cultures (in French), 74 (2): 65–87, doi:10.4000/droitcultures.4264
- Faure, Sébastien (1934), Encyclopédie anarchiste [Anarchist encyclopedia], Paris: La Librairie internationale
- Frayne, Carl Tobias (2022), Individualist Anarchism in France and Its Legacy (PhD thesis), Cambridge: University of Cambridge, doi:10.17863/CAM.80240
