= International Socialist Labor Congress of Brussels, 1891 =

2nd Congress of the Second International

International Socialist Labor Congress, the second congress of the Second International met in Brussels, Belgium from August 16–22, 1891 at the Maison du Peuple, the headquarters of the Belgian Workers Party.

== Delegates ==
Country	# of Delegates	Notes
Austria	11	
Belgium	147	Representing the Belgian Workers Party
Denmark	3	
France	66	
Germany	42	represented the Social Democratic Party of Germany
Great Britain	23	Representing the Scottish Labour Party, Social Democratic Federation, Legal Eight Hours league, etc.
Hungary	2	
Italy	4	
Netherlands	9	Representing Social Democratic League
Norway	1	
Poland	7	Representing Proletariat; Polish Social Revolutionaries; Socialist Workers Party of Galicia
Romania	5	
Spain	1	Spanish Socialist Workers' Party
Sweden	1	Representing the Social Democratic Workers' Party of Sweden
Switzerland	6	Representing Workers Union of Grutli; Democratic Socialist Party of St. Gall; Democratic Socialist Party of Basle;
United States	6	Representing the United Hebrew Trades; Socialist Labor Party

For full list of delegates and the organizations they represented see, below, Congrès international ouvrier socialiste tenu à Bruxelles du 16 au 23 août p. 239-48.

== Resolutions ==
The congress passed resolutions on the conditions of membership to the congress, international labor legislation, the Jewish question and the rights of women, the position of the working class regarding militarism, and strikes. It also proclaim May 1 a proletarian holiday.

The resolution on the Jewish question originally only condemned anti-Semitism, and stated the liberation of the Jews, as with every other people, would only be brought about by the advent of socialism. It was changed however, on the initiative of Dr. Regnard and M. Argyriades, of France, to condemn both anti-semitic and "philo-semitic" tyranny, noting that many Jewish financiers and banks were "great oppressors of labour".
