= François Soubrié =

French socialist and anarchist miner

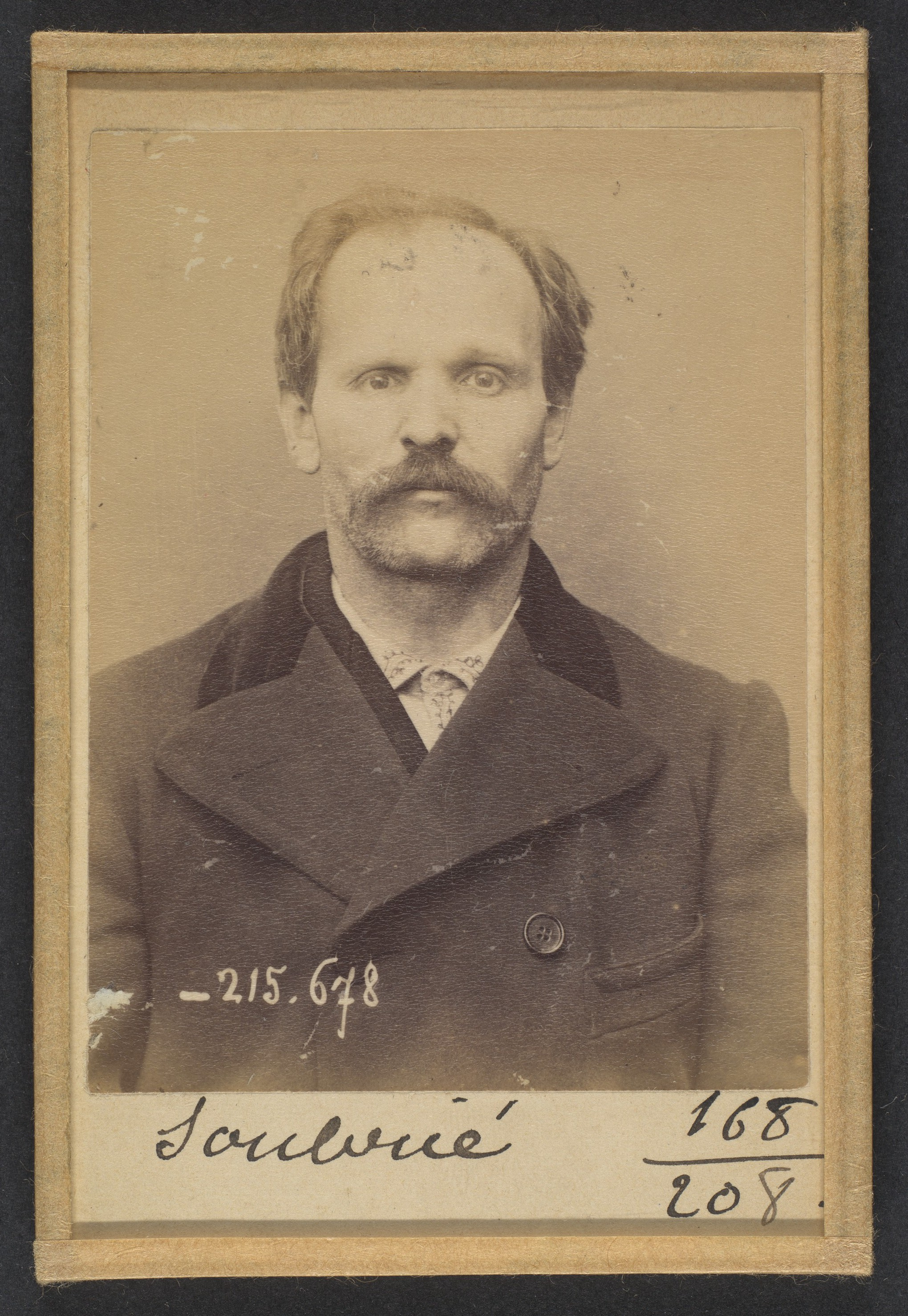
- François Soubrié's mugshot taken by Alphonse Bertillon (Anthropometric File of Anarchists - 1894)
- Born: May 23, 1854; Livinhac-le-Haut, France
- Citizenship: France
- Occupation: miner
- Movement: Anarchism

François Soubrié (1854-?) was a French socialist and later anarchist miner. He is known for his central role in the Decazeville miners' strike, during which he was a representative for the miners and highly regarded by the local residents. He later drew closer to anarchism and joined the anarchist movement in France. He was one of the accused in the Trial of the Thirty and, like most of the defendants, was acquitted.

Born into a family of farmers, Soubrié started working as a miner in Decazeville. During the major strike that affected the mine in 1886, he was elected delegate and then vice-president of the miners' delegates. In January 1886, the miners threw one of the company bosses, Jules Watrin, out of a window, an act that Soubrié defended. He threatened other representatives who might betray the miners' cause, which led to his arrest during the strike and a four-month prison sentence for the declaration. After his arrest, the army had to be deployed to Decazeville to transfer him for his trial, and large crowds gathered to greet him along the way. While in prison, he refused to run as a candidate in the legislative elections for the Seine department, which included Paris, but was placed on the ballots anyway, finishing third. After his release, he returned to Aveyron and was welcomed by miners and residents of the towns he entered, such as Viviers, with chants of La Marseillaise. He then became involved in anarchist activism, moving to Paris to find work after being fired. He was welcomed by companion Auguste Lucas, who provided him with accommodation, money, and a job. He subsequently attended meetings of the International Anarchist Circle in Paris. In 1894, he was targeted by French authorities, put on trial during the Trial of the Thirty, and accused of criminal conspiracy. He was acquitted and continued his activism. Soubrié was noted as an anarchist until at least 1896.

His police mugshot is part of the collection at the Metropolitan Museum of Art (MET).

== Biography ==
François Auguste Soubrié was born on 23 May 1854, in Livinhac-le-Haut, in the Aveyron department. His mother, Eugénie Labro, was unemployed, and his father was a farmer. Soubrié began working as a miner in Decazeville.

=== Decazeville miners' strike and imprisonment ===
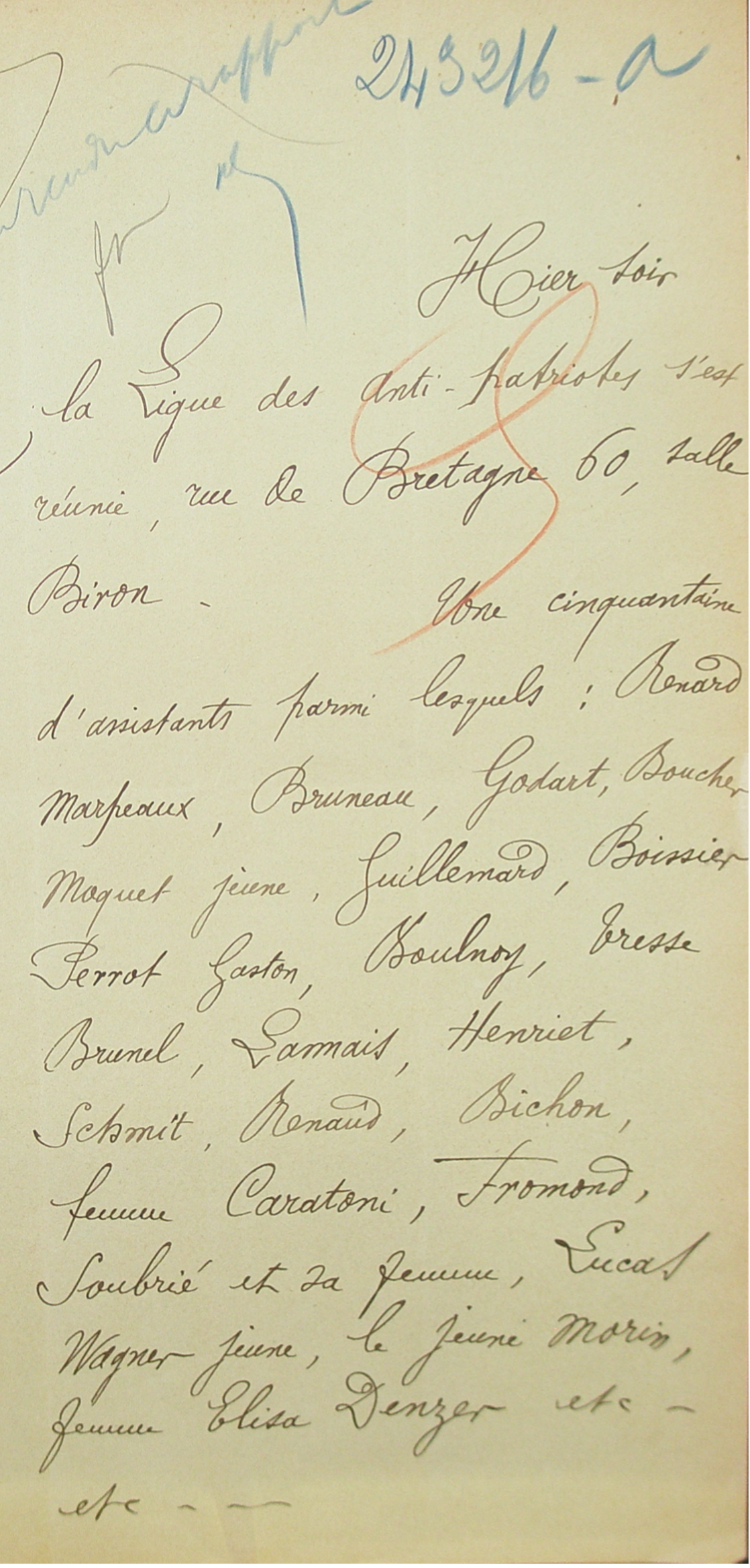
Report on La Ligue des antipatriotes attendants by French authorities including Brunet or Soubrié (courtesy of Archives anarchistes)

In Decazeville, Soubrié became a delegate, then vice-president of the delegates for his mine during the major strike of 1886. In January 1886, Jules Watrin (1836?-1886), the sub-director of the Houillères et Fonderies d’Aveyron in Decazeville, was thrown out of a window during the strike. His fate gave rise to a new word in French, 'watrinade," meaning 'the assassination of a boss, foreman or factory manager, a workshop boss, a factory head'.

In March, while the strike was still ongoing, Soubrié declared that if any of the other delegates or anyone else were to betray the miners, they would be 'watrinized'. This statement led to his arrest on the same day, as authorities accused him of making a general threat against all traitors without specifying, which allowed them to convict him. He was defended by Émile Basly and Zéphirin Camelinat, two socialist deputies who had attended the speech and argued that he was only referring to the other delegates, which was not a crime under the law.

French authorities decided to transfer him out of Decazeville and deployed the army to prevent a public uprising. A line company was stationed at the train station, while the town streets were patrolled by dragoons. A large crowd gathered along his transfer route. Before his train departed, he turned to his wife, Camelinat, Basly, and Antoine Duc Quercy, editor-in-chief of the newspaper Le Cri du Peuple, and shouted, 'Farewell, citizens!'

During his trial in Villefranche de Rouergue, he initially stated that he did not regret Watrin's death, but he later retracted his words during the proceedings. Basly and Camelinat testified to save him. He was sentenced to four months in prison for his statement.

While he was in prison, many socialists from the Paris region wanted to nominate him as a candidate in the legislative elections for the Seine department, which included Paris. He categorically refused this proposal, writing that he did not want to cause a split within the socialist movement by running against Ernest Roche. He urged other socialists to withdraw his candidacy and vote for Roche. Among other things, he wrote:

I formally and with full freedom of appreciation declare that I do not accept a candidacy in the Seine department. I protest against the misuse of my name.

His requests were not followed, as he was still nominated as a candidate without his knowledge—but he lost the election, finishing in third place.

When he was released from prison and returned home, he was awaited at the Viviers train station by many miners. He was greeted by the town's population with great respect, and the residents sang La Marseillaise in his honor as he entered the town.

=== Anarchist militancy ===
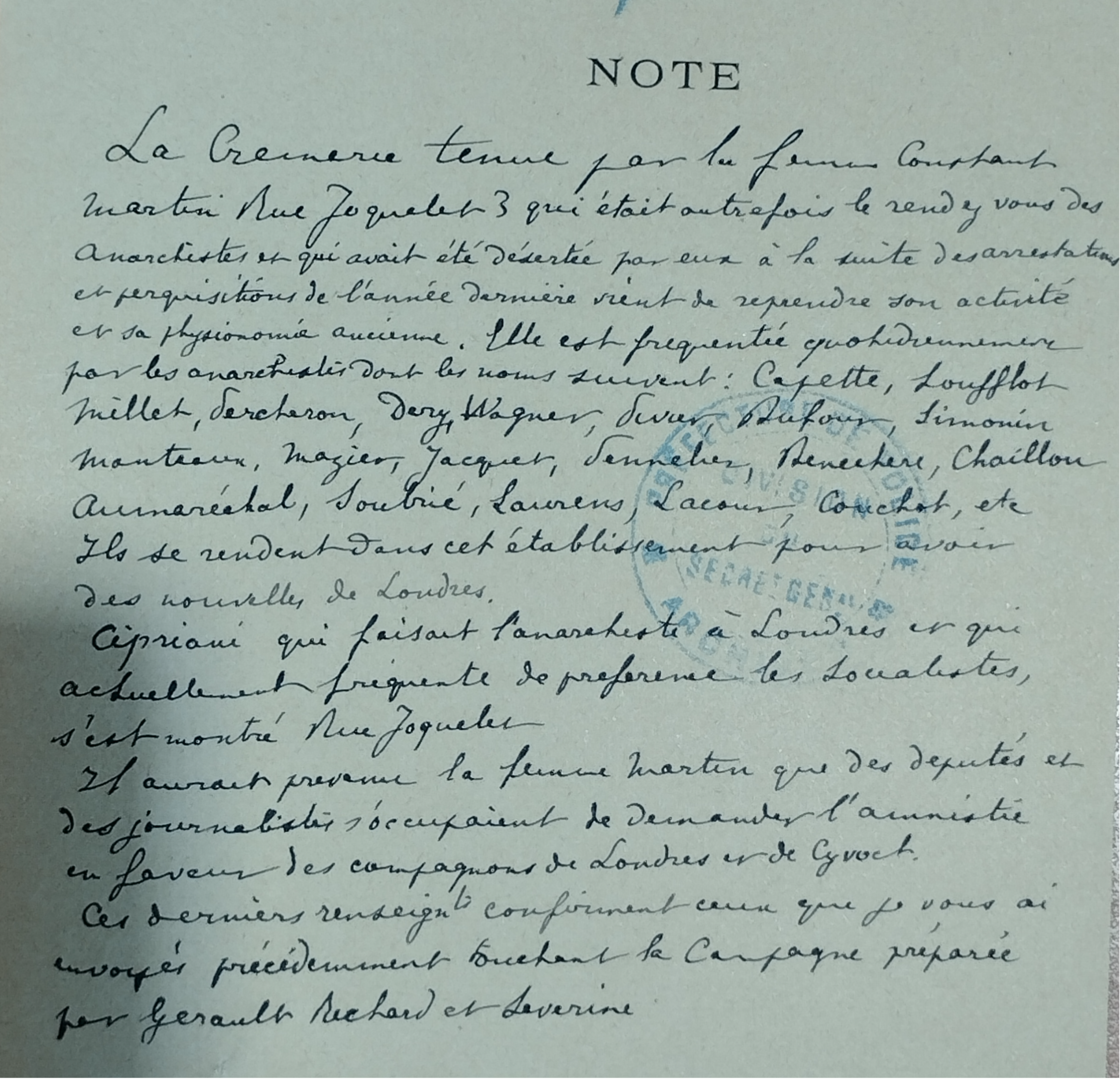
Report on companion Ernesta Forti and the many anarchists she gathered in her creamery, including Soubrié (courtesy of Archives anarchistes)

In October 1886, Soubrié was arrested by two gendarmes in Le Gua while selling copies of the anarchist newspaper Le Révolté, among other publications. He was taken to Aubin and released. Ignoring the police, he resumed his sales. The officers stated that they had not chained him because they were short on handcuffs, but that they should have found another way to prevent him from continuing.

He was fired from his job as a miner a few days later and decided to move to Paris with his family to find work. He was in contact with the anarchist companion Auguste Lucas, who provided him with food, money, and helped him find a job. During this time, Soubrié joined the anarchist movement in Paris and attended meetings of the International Anarchist Circle, founded by Alexandre Tennevin.

Two years later, Lucas was implicated for firing on a convoy of Blanquists and Boulangists who were bringing a wreath of flowers to the Murs des Fédérés, a key memorial site for the Paris Commune. The conflict revolved around the wreath from L’Intransigeant, a Blanquist newspaper that was increasingly moving towards antisemitism and the far right during this period. Lucas wounded two Boulangists, and Soubrié testified at his trial to defend him, stating:

I saw Lucas after the incident on the 27th. He told me that the sight of L’Intransigeant's wreath had outraged him. He added that he had fired at random and was pained to have wounded people. 'I didn't want to kill a man,' he told me, 'I wanted to kill a party—the Boulangist party!'

Soubrié stated that he had temporarily housed Lucas after the incident because Lucas was a very good person to other comrades and because Lucas himself had housed and helped him when he was in need.

In the following years, he continued to be noted as an anarchist by the authorities. During the repression of early 1894, his home was raided, and police found a notebook with notes on numerous meetings of the International Anarchist Circle—including one two years earlier, in 1892, where a speaker had allegedly made illegal remarks.

He was then put on trial during the Trial of the Thirty, which targeted thirty leading figures of anarchism in France, intended for condemnation in a political trial following the assassination of Sadi Carnot by Sante Caserio. The authorities mixed the illegalists of the Ortiz gang with anarchist theoreticians. Like almost all of the accused, he was acquitted by the jury.

Two years later, he was still noted as an anarchist but had reportedly stopped meeting other members of the movement.

== Legacy ==
=== Police mugshot ===
His police mugshot are part of the collections of the Metropolitan Museum of Art (MET).

== Bibliography ==
- Bach Jensen, Richard (2015). The Battle against Anarchist Terrorism: An International History, 1878–1934. Cambridge: Cambridge University Press (CUP). ISBN 978-1-107-03405-1.
- Davranche, Guillaume; Petit, Dominique (2024), SOUBRIÉ François, Auguste, Paris: Le Maitron
- Dupuy, Rolf (2025), "SOUBRIE, François, Auguste", Dictionnaire international des militants anarchistes, Paris
