= Ernesta Forti =

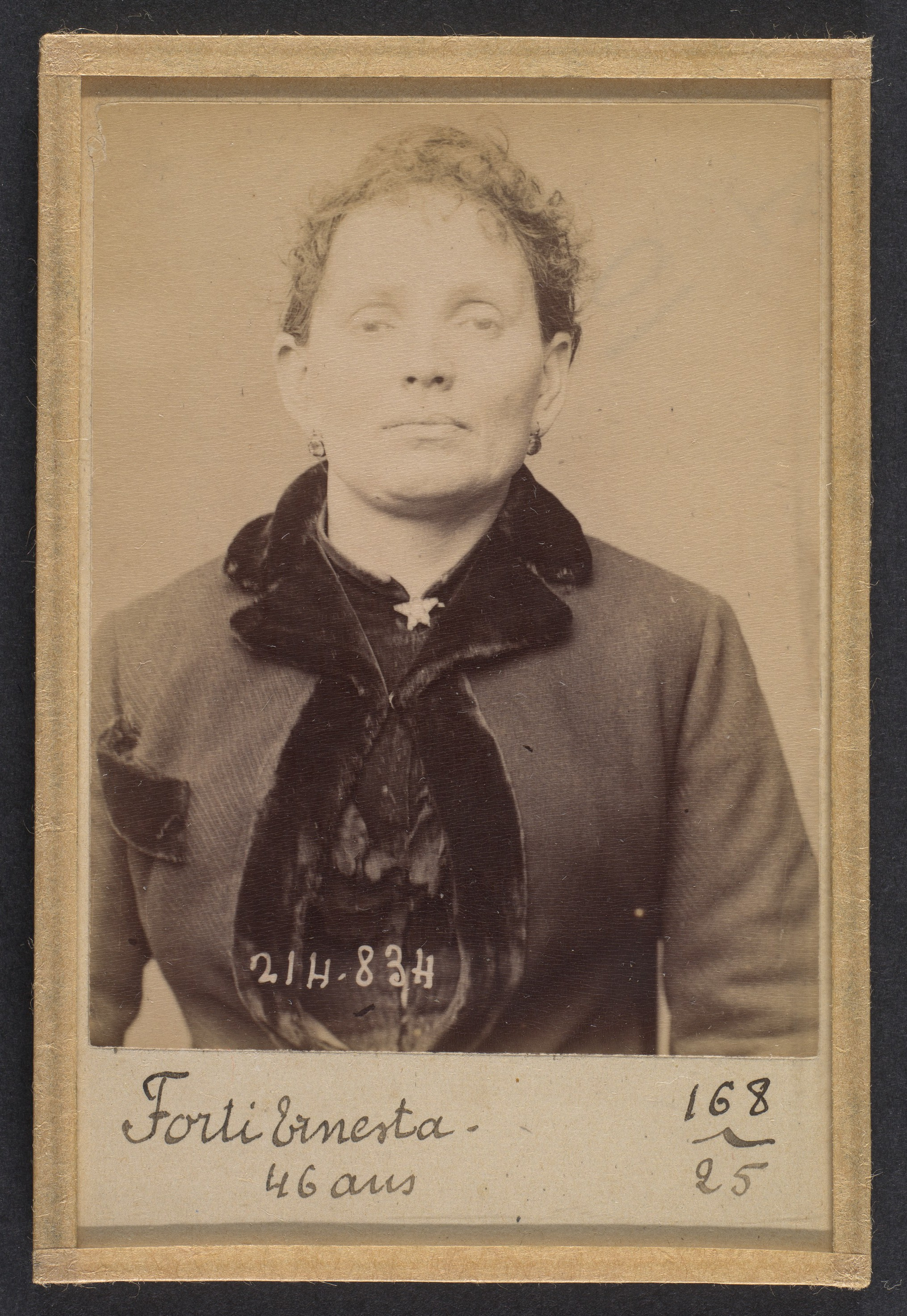
- Ernesta Forti's mugshot taken by Alphonse Bertillon (Anthropometric File of Anarchists - 1894)
- Born: March 17, 1848; Lodi, Lombardy, Italy
- Occupations: dairy worker, anarchist
- Known for: Anarchist activism
- Movement: Anarchism

Signature
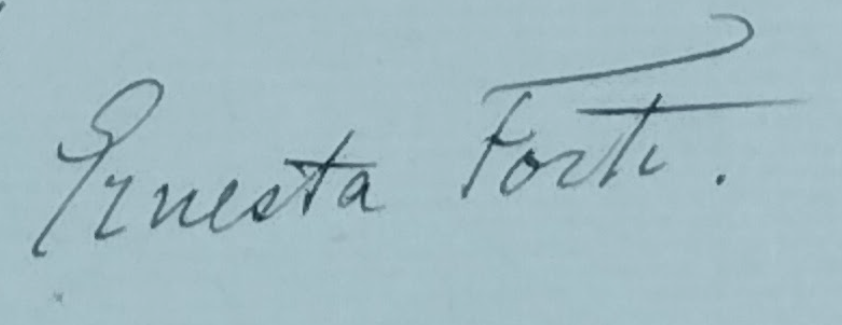

Ernesta Forti (1848, in Lodi - ?) was an Italian and French dairy worker and anarchist. She is best known for the Parisian dairy shop she ran with her partner, Constant Martin, in the 1880s and 1890s. This shop served as a gathering place for a number of anarchists in France during that period.

Born in Italy, Forti had a son before moving to France, where she entered a relationship with Constant Martin and joined the anarchist movement. She ran a dairy shop on Jocquelet street and was targeted by the repression of early 1894, before being expelled from the country. Taking refuge in London, the anarchist married another companion to obtain French nationality and returned to France, where she resumed managing her dairy shop.

Her police mugshot is part of the collections of the Metropolitan Museum of Art (MET).

== Biography ==
Ernesta Forti was born on 17 March 1848 in Lodi. In 1875, she had a son in Milan and named him Alfredo Forti.

Starting in 1888, Forti, who was then in a relationship with the Communard and anarchist Constant Martin, ran a dairy shop with him at 3 Jocquelet street. She was registered as an anarchist during the repression of early 1894; in February, she was raided and arrested on the 27th along with her son and an anarchist customer, Louis Barbier—whom the police then suspected of being an accomplice of Émile Henry.

She was subsequently expelled from French territory as a foreigner the following month by a decree dated 8 March 1894, and she moved to London with her son. The dairy shop was taken over by the anarchist Clotilde Loth, who briefly hosted Louis Matha, the editor of l'Endehors.

Meanwhile, in London, Forti married the anarchist Joseph Sicard in a sham marriage to obtain French nationality for herself and her son, whom Sicard officially adopted. According to a French police report, Sicard allegedly had difficulty renouncing sexual relations with her and had to be reminded to respect her wishes by fellow companions.

She returned on 24 October 1894 and presented her nationality certificates to the authorities before resuming the management of the dairy shop.

In 1895, French authorities' reports indicated that her dairy shop was, once again, a meeting place for many anarchists, including François Soubrié. During this period, she allegedly received a visit from Amilcare Cipriani, a former anarchist turned socialist deputy, who reportedly came to inform her of the efforts he was making to secure amnesty for the anarchists in London.

== Legacy ==
Her police mugshot is part of the collections of the Metropolitan Museum of Art (MET).

== Bibliography ==
- Dupuy, Rolf; Enckell, Marianne; Petit, Dominique (2024), FORTI Ernesta (ou Madeleine) [épouse SICARD, dite femme Constant MARTIN], Paris: Le Maitron
- Dupuy, Rolf (2025), "FORTI, Ernesta", Dictionnaire international des militants anarchistes, Paris
