= Philogone Segard =

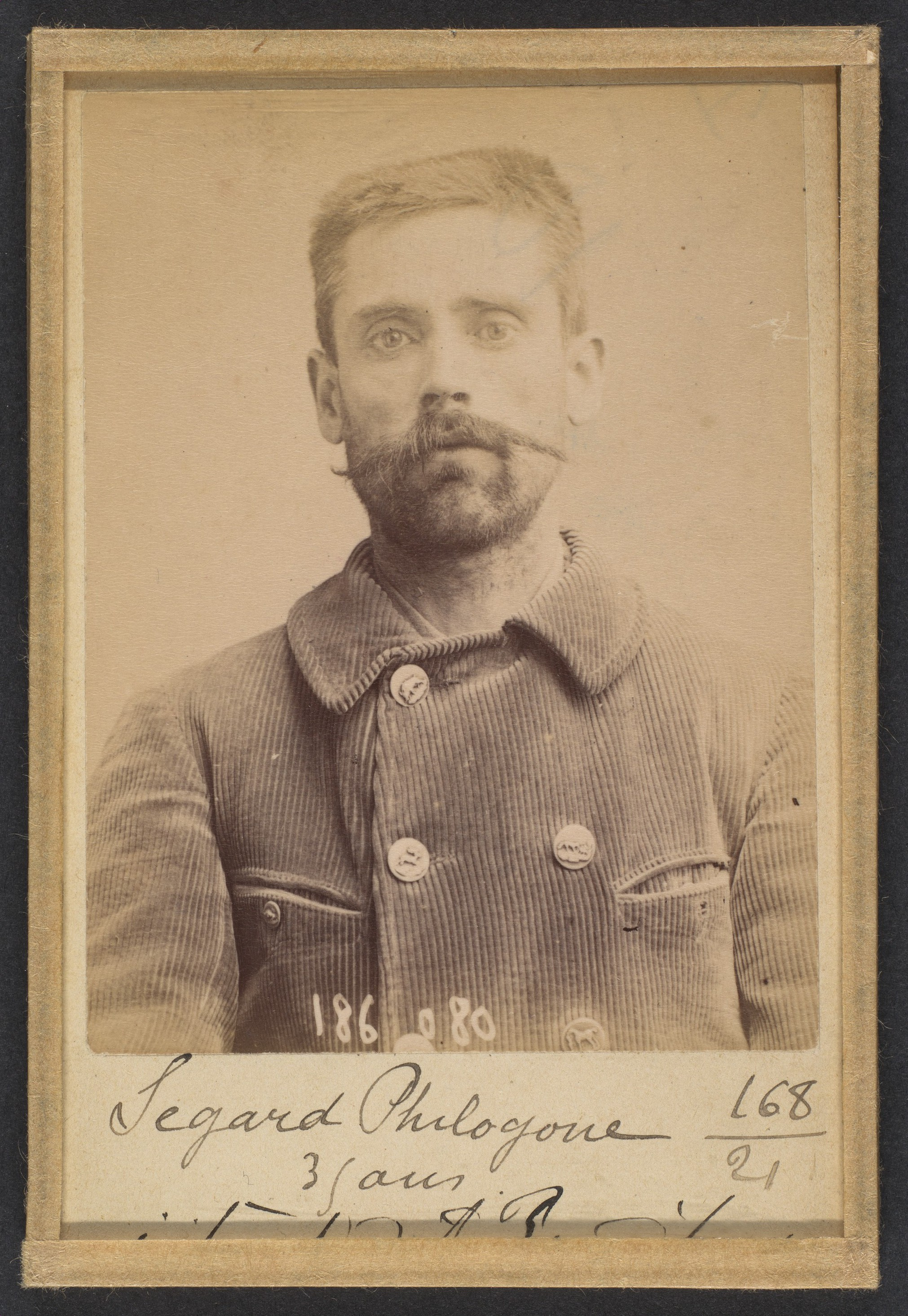
- Philogone Segard's mugshot, taken by Alphonse Bertillon in 1894
- Born: April 24, 1858; Saleux, France
- Died: 21 February 1927; Dury
- Citizenship: France
- Occupations: rope-maker factory worker
- Movement: Anarchism
- Spouse: Marie Léonie Mécrent
- Children: Albert Philogone Segard; Émilien Segard
- Parent(s): Valentine Leclercq; Narcisse Segard

Philogone Segard (23 April 1858 – 21 February 1927) was a rope-maker and anarchist from Saint-Denis. Segard was a notable figure in anarchist circles of Saint-Denis during the 1880s and 1890s, becoming an important figure in the anarchist movement in France.

Born into a working-class family, Segard married Marie Léonie Mécrent and moved with her to Saint-Denis. There, the couple became involved with anarchist circles in the northern suburbs of Paris, where they became prominent figures. Segard was particularly close to Désiré Pauwels and was involved with the Clichy affair, where he shot at gendarmes. As a result of the Clichy affair he fled with Pauwels to London, where they resided for a time with Louise Michel, he returned to France in 1892. He re-established the Saint-Denis anarchist group and was acquainted with Ravachol during the period preceding the start of what was called the Ère des attentats. A radical militant, he was frequently raided and arrested but managed to avoid convictions for heavy sentences. In 1894 Segard left Île-de-France for Amiens, where he continued his anarchist activism in the following years. He died in 1927.

His police photograph is part of the Metropolitan Museum of Art (MET) collections.

== Biography ==
=== Birth and youth ===
Philogone Ferdinand Segard was born on 23 April 1858, in Saleux in the Somme department. His parents, Valentine Leclercq and Narcisse Segard, were both laborers. In 1878, Segard was discharged from military service due to his weak constitution.

In 1880, he married Marie Léonie Mécrent, who was one year his senior, in Salouël. In doing so, Segard adopted and legitimized Mécrent's five-year-old son, Émilien Segard, who would also go on to become an anarchist militant.

=== Anarchist militancy ===
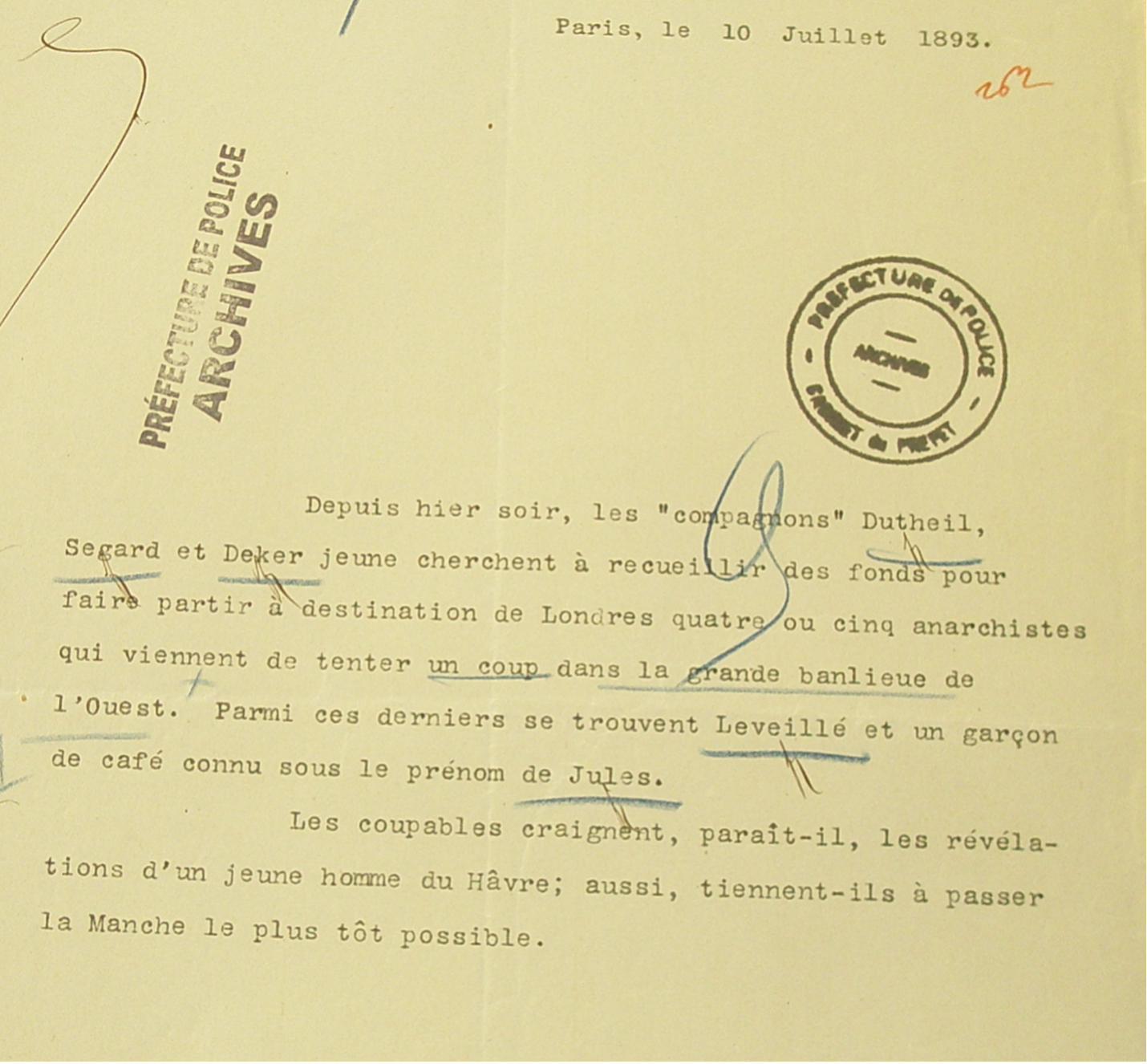
Police report on Segard, Decker the Younger and Dutheil receiving funds from companions to organize an 'affair' in the western suburbs of Paris (courtesy of Archives anarchistes)

In 1884, he moved to Saint-Denis with his wife, where he worked as a rope-maker. In 1886, their son, Albert Philogone Segard, died at the age of nineteen months. In the years that followed, he joined anarchist groups in Saint-Denis and the northern suburbs of Paris— groups known for significant working-class participation and notable radicalism. The anarchists of Saint-Denis were a radical anarchist youth and strong supporters of propaganda by the deed and individual reclamation.

He worked several jobs, including at a gas factory, while joining the anarchist movement in France. In the late 1880s, he participated in La Jeunesse libertaire, an anarchist group in Saint-Denis. Segard was later chosen to be in charge of the library for the anarchist group of Saint-Denis, founded in 1889, which included figures such as Désiré Pauwels, Gustave Mathieu, the Chaumentin couple, Charles 'Cookie' Simon, Élisée Bastard, and Auguste Heurteaux.

Starting in 1890, Segard held meetings at his home, which became a gathering place for some anarchists. Pauwels spread copies of an anti-militarist manifesto he had written there. On 1 May 1890, Segard was arrested alongside Anselme Monneret, François Kaision, Ernest Bourgeois, and François Pourry, they were put on trial for incitement of looting.

On 1 May 1891, Segard participated in the anarchist procession and then in the Clichy affair, where he fired shots at gendarmes. Segard and Pauwels were together when the police came to arrest them, managing to escape through a garden and reach London, where they stayed with Louise Michel. Segard transferred explosives to his wife, Marie Léonie Mécrent, shortly after and the couple was notably spied on by the informant X2, who would denounce Ravachol the following year. Pierre Martinet visited her during his exile to inform her that he had obtained a pardon for Altéran from the Minister of the Interior, Ernest Constans.

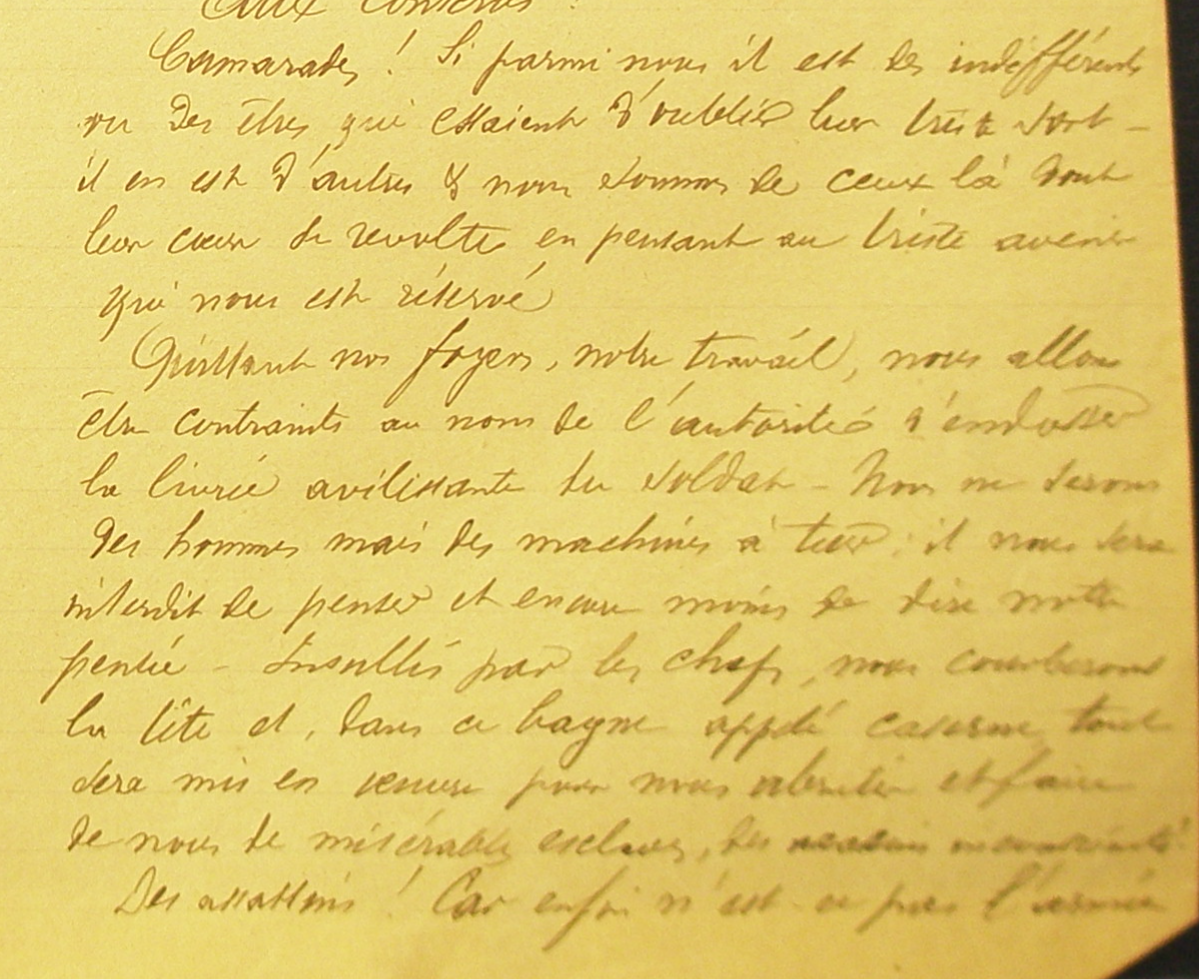
X2 copying Pauwel's antimilitarist manifesto at Segard's home (courtesy of Archives anarchistes)

Segard had several networks during his escape. He went into hiding in France with Pauwels, then returned to Saint-Denis in November 1891, where he re-established the local group with Heurteaux, Dutheil, and Bastard. At the time, he was convinced that a war involving France was imminent and wanted anarchists to develop urban guerrilla movements to fight the enemies of anarchists, such as the state. The police noted that he was a central figure in the anarchist networks of the period and was in contact with Pierre Martinet, Jean Grave, Faure and David Altéran, as well as Ravachol during his time in Saint-Denis prior to his attacks. According to Constance Bantman, he was one of the 'leaders' of the Saint-Denis anarchists during that period.

Regarding Ravachol, the police informant X2 wrote the following about him on 6 April 1892, at the beginning of a period commonly known as the Ère des attentats:

Ségard has almost admitted that he knew Ravachol, Béala, etc., and all those who are implicated in the recent attacks. He laments that these brave anarchists were betrayed, he curses the Chaumartin family, without them, he says, nothing would ever have been leaked, but he adds, 'others remain to continue the work of destruction, we have everything we need to succeed. Whatever the obstacles, we will break them; we will reach our goal, we will be more cautious, more discreet, and above all, more cruel. We will start by eliminating all members of the press, policemen without distinction, deputies, etc.'

If we are to believe him, we will soon witness some strange things.

While he was back in Saint-Denis and still in contact with Pauwels, who had immigrated to the United Kingdom, he was arrested on 22 April 1892 in anticipation of May Day. Segard was eventually raided along with Pauwels and Bastard in December 1892 near Nancy while all three were using pseudonyms.

At the beginning of 1893, X2 recommended that Segard be heavily monitored as well as Élisée Bastard, considering both of them to be dangerous anarchists who were aware of a number of planned attacks and actions. X2 claimed they were always armed.

In January of the same year Segard published an anti-patriotic manifesto with Joseph Ouin, among others, and was then suspected of having published the poster Death to thieves! with Bastard.

Segard was raided during the repression of January and February 1894; the police found a black flag with the inscription 'Anarchy is the future of humanity!', improvised weapons made of spikes embedded in lead pipes—his walls were covered with illustrations of Ravachol in his cell, the Clichy bombing, and portraits of the victims of the Chicago massacre, Gustave Mathieu, Vittorio Pini, Théodule Meunier, Jean-Pierre François, and Élisée Reclus—above whom he had written 'The Anarchist'.

In the following three months, he was arrested three times by the authorities, each time being released shortly after; the last time for having housed Louis Matha; when they came to arrest him, he told the police 'I expected it'.

=== Later years and death ===
Freed after the case against him and his son, Émilien Segard, was dismissed, he left Paris to settle in Amiens. There he worked as a laborer for a time before becoming a beverage seller. Segard continued his anarchist activism there for the following years, and was still listed as a convicted militant until at least 1911.

He was removed from the B file list in 1922, at the age of 64. He died on 21 February 1927 in Dury.

== Legacy ==
=== Police mugshot ===
His police mugshot is part of the collections of the Metropolitan Museum of Art (MET).

== Bibliography ==
- Bouhey, Vivien (2008), Les Anarchistes contre la République [The Anarchists against the Republic] (in French), Rennes: Presses universitaires de Rennes (PUR)
- Petit, Dominique (2024), SEGARD Philogone, Paris: Le Maitron
- Samzun, Patrick (2025), "SEGARD, Philogone, Ferdinand", Dictionnaire international des militants anarchistes, Paris
