= Léontine Borreman =

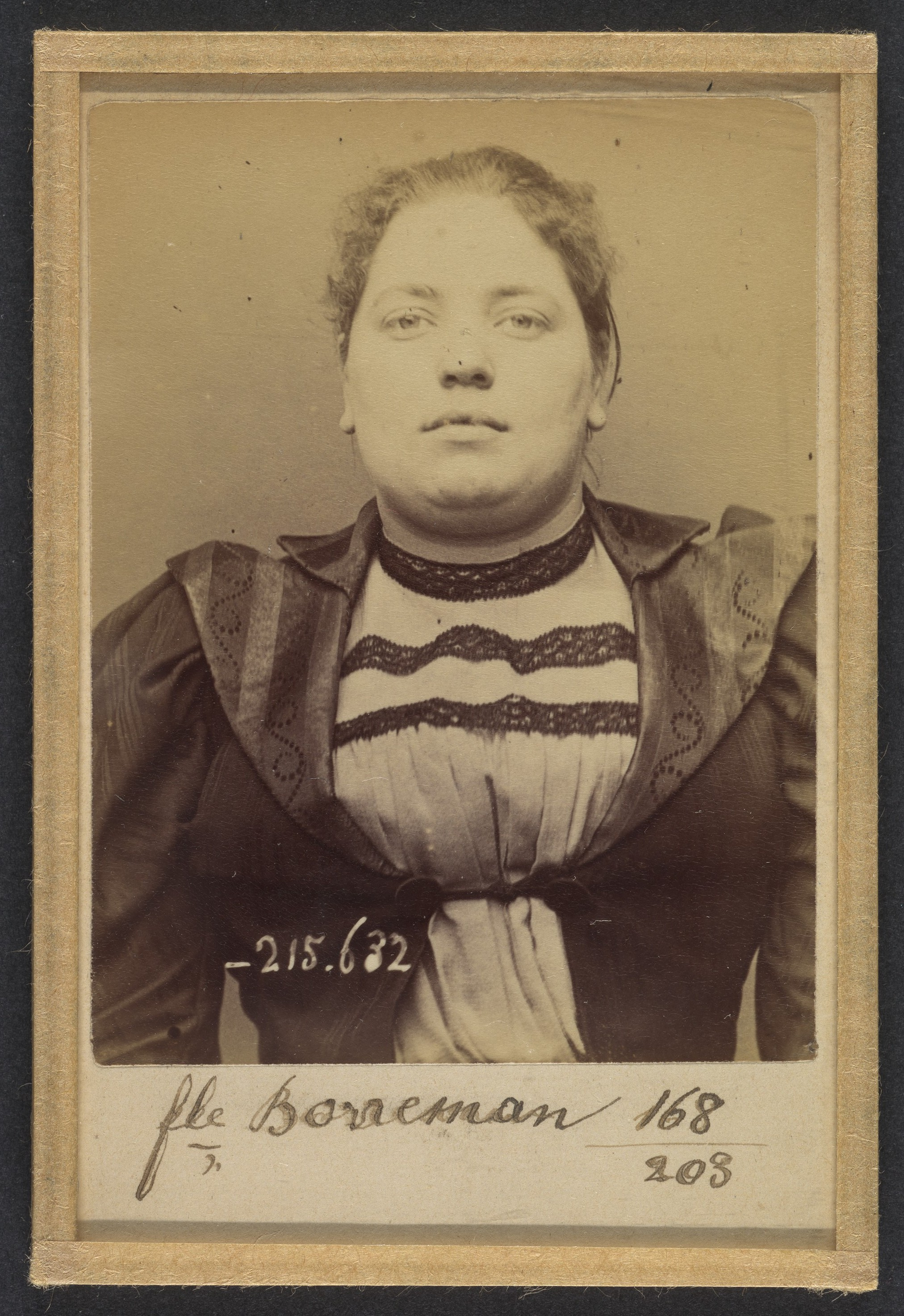
- Léontine Borreman's mugshot taken by Alphonse Bertillon (Anthropometric File of Anarchists – 1894)
- Born: Léontine Madeleine Borreman; 25 December 1870; 1st arrondissement of Paris, France
- Died: 12 February 1936 (aged 65); Le Perreux-sur-Marne, France
- Other name: Titine
- Citizenship: France
- Occupations: Milliner, singer, stationer, sex worker (?)
- Movement: Anarchism
- Spouse: Martin Thissen (m. 1900)

Léontine Borreman (25 December 1870 – 12 February 1936), nicknamed Titine, was a French anarchist milliner, stationer, singer, and possibly a sex worker.

Born in 1870, she emigrated to Brazil in the late 1880s, where she encountered anarchists and lived as a milliner and singer. Returning to Paris in 1893, Borreman joined the anarchist movement there, performing several times as a singer in the wine shop run by companions Louis Duprat and Louise Pioger—a prominent gathering place for the movement at the time. Six months after coming back, she was targeted during the wave of repression in early 1894: her home was raided, and she was imprisoned for a month before being released and cleared of all charges. Borreman married in 1900 and died next to Paris in 1936.

Her police mugshot is held in the collections of the Metropolitan Museum of Art (MET).

== Biography ==
=== Birth, teenage years, youth ===
Léontine Madeleine Borreman was born in the 1st arrondissement of Paris on 25 December 1870. Her father was a decorative painter.

At the age of 19, she left France for Rio de Janeiro. There, Borreman worked as a milliner and a singer, performing at the city's Folies Bergère. In the Brazilian city, she moved in the same circles as many anarchists and was supported financially by a Turkish lover nicknamed 'Georges Pacha'.

=== 1890s ===
Returning to Paris on 2 July 1893, with 'quantities of jewelry and quite a bit of money', according to La Gazette nationale, Borreman moved into a hotel where she was noted by the police for engaging in sex work. She was evicted two months later by the owner of the hostel for 'misconduct.'

At the same time, she integrated into Parisian anarchist circles and frequented the wine shop run by Louis Duprat and his partner, Louise Pioger. In these circles, where she was nicknamed 'Titine', Borreman often sang romances and was characterized by the newspaper Le Gaulois as a 'rose-water companion'. She was particularly close to the anarchist companion Emilie Sacksteder, with whom she went to live.

Police reports concerning her during this period are contradictory and focus on her romantic and sexual relationships: an initial report claims she was intimately involved with Sébastien Faure, Paul Bernard, Paul Paillette, and Riedfel, while a subsequent police report states that none of this information could be corroborated by concrete evidence.

In February 1894, Borreman was noticed by agents joking with Élisée Bastard. According to Le Parisien, she was in charge of selling the main anarchist newspapers of the period.

During the wave of repression in early 1894, while she was distributing anarchist newspapers as a stationer, the anarchist was targeted, her home was raided, and she was arrested for one month. During her detention, she was photographed by Alphonse Bertillon before being released. The charges of 'criminal association' against her were dropped the following year.

=== 1900s and later years ===
Borreman lived in Antwerp at the turn of the century, working as a milliner, before marrying one Martin Thissen, a tavern keeper, in Brussels on 4 February 1900. It is unknown when she returned to France.

Borreman died at the age of 65 at 8, sentier de la Croix-d’Eau in Le Perreux-sur-Marne on 12 February 1936, noted on the act as being Thissen's widow.

== Legacy ==
=== Police mugshot ===
Her police mugshot is held in the collections of the Metropolitan Museum of Art (MET).

== Bibliography ==
- Petit, Dominique (2024), "BORREMAN Léontine, Eugénie, Madeleine dite Titine", Dictionnaire des anarchistes (Le Maitron), Paris: Le Maitron des anarchistes
- Petit, Dominique (2026), "BORREMAN Léontine, Eugénie, Madeleine [dite Titine]", Dictionnaire international des militant·e·s anarchistes, Paris
