= Numa Auguez =

French opera singer

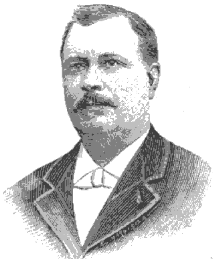

Florentin Antinoüs Numa Auguez (31 January 1847 in Saleux (Somme) – 27 January 1903 in Paris) was a 19th-century French baritone and singing teacher at the Conservatoire de Paris.

== Biography ==
After two years of commercial employment in the capital, Numa Auguez was admitted to the Paris Conservatoire in 1867, where he obtained a first runner-up in the opera competition and a second one in July 1869. His stage debut was abruptly interrupted by the declaration of war in 1870, when he enlisted and distinguished himself in the battle of Epernay. After the war, he resumed classes at the Conservatoire for an additional year before being hired at the Paris Opera.

For nine years from 1873 to 1882, he was part of the Palais Garnier troupe. He then left Paris to perform in Rome in Italy and in Antwerp in Belgium between 1883 and 1884. On his return to France, he was engaged by the Colonne, Harcourt and Lamoureux concerts as well as by the Conservatoire where he obtained his greatest successes.

Widower of Blanche Bourgeat, he married Marie-Berthe de Montalant (1865–1937) in February 1893, a lyrical artist and singing teacher who would now perform under the name of Berthe Auguez de Montalant.

Numa Auguez left the operatic scenes in 1899 and devoted himself to teaching singing at the Conservatory and the École Niedermeyer de Paris.

Numa Auguez died at the age of 55 as a result of a long illness. He is buried in his native village after a funeral in the Saint-Augustin church in Paris.

== Distinctions ==
- Military Medal as a Volunteer War Veteran of 1870–1871

== Sources ==
- Le nouvel Opéra : le monument, les artistes by X.Y.Z., Paris, Michel Lévy frères, 1875
- Dictionnaire du monde artistique
- La Gazette artistique littéraire et illustrée n° 6 (1898)
- Le Journal de Rouen, 29 January 1903
