= Émilien Segard =

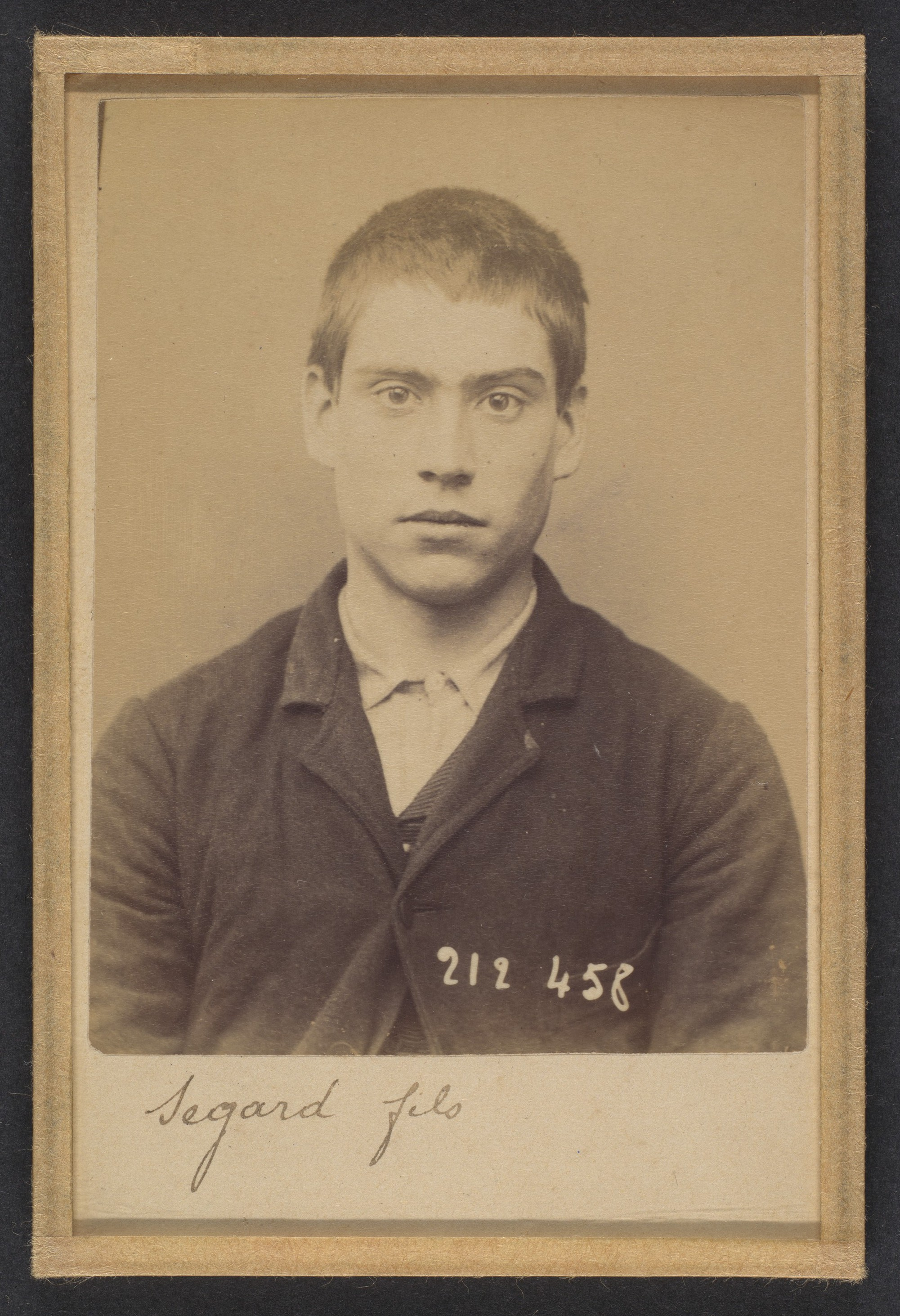
- Émilien Segard's mugshot, taken by Alphonse Bertillon in 1894
- Born: June 1, 1871; Salouël, France
- Died: 20th century
- Citizenship: France
- Occupations: car and house painter
- Movement: Anarchism
- Parent(s): Philogone Segard; Marie Léonie Mécrent

Émilien Segard, born on 1 June 1875 in Salouël and dead on an unknown date in the 20th century, was a French house painter and anarchist. The son of Philogone Segard and Marie Léonie Mécrent, he followed his parents into the anarchist movement and became part of the anarchist groups of the 1890s, particularly in Saint-Denis.

Born into a working-class anarchist family, Segard joined his parents in the anarchist movement of Saint-Denis and carried out a number of actions in the 1890s and 1900s, with a particular interest in antimilitarism. He died on an unknown date in the 20th century.

His police mugshot is part of the collections of the Metropolitan Museum of Art (MET).

== Biography ==
=== Birth and early life ===
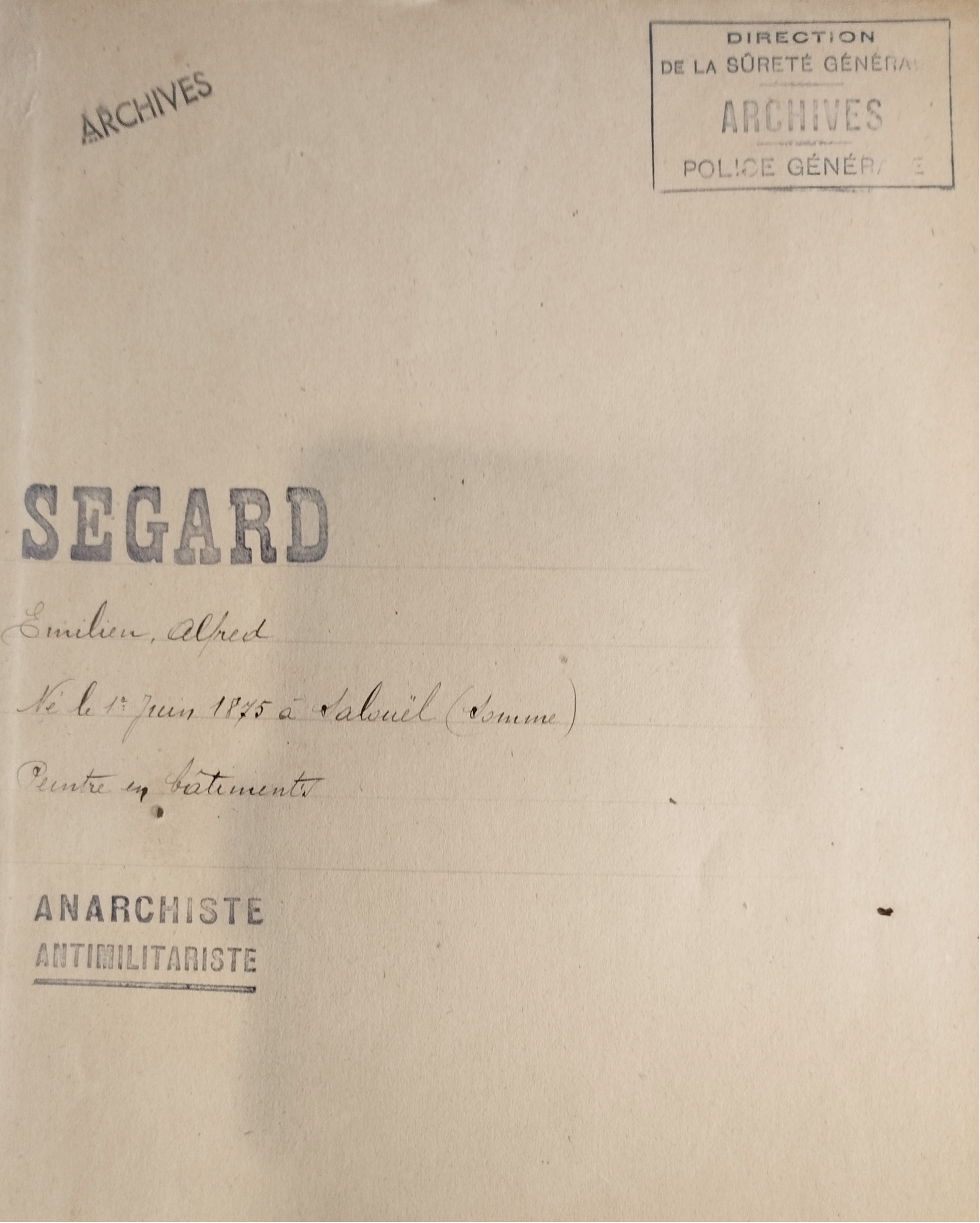
Cover of Émilien Segard's police file (courtesy of Archives anarchistes)

Émilien Alfred Segard was born in Salouël, in the Somme department, on 1 June 1875. The son of Marie Léonie Mécrent, he was adopted by Philogone Segard in 1880, at the time of their marriage.

=== Anarchist militancy ===
Like his parents, Segard joined the anarchist circles of Saint-Denis, groups that were young, working-class, and relatively radical, advocating for ideas such as individual reclamation and propaganda by the deed. In February 1893, Segard was noticed opposing the military service lottery in Saint-Denis by distributing Le Père Peinard to the conscripts. He also posted the special issue of the newspaper, Le Père Peinard au populo, on the walls of the southern police station of Saint-Denis.

Segard then went to the Somme with anarchist companion Claude Defosse, where he reportedly helped transmit information between his father and London. Both of them were raided for in Salouël, but the police were unable to arrest them.

The anarchist later returned to Saint-Denis, where he settled and worked as a car painter. He was arrested multiple times for his anarchist activities and his mugshot were taken according to the Bertillon method. He was then sent for his military service, where he was closely monitored before being sent away and judged "unfit" to serve in November 1897. A few months later, in February 1898, Segard was arrested in Amiens with other anarchist companions for fighting with Catholics during one of their conferences. He was sentenced to twenty days in prison along with three other companions.

In 1903, he returned to Saint-Denis with his mother, but the police were unable to locate him until the following year, when they found he was staying with Louis Grandidier. However, he then left that residence to return to Amiens.

By 1909, he was in Paris, working as a house painter and was monitored as a "dangerous" anarchist who didn't attend demonstrations but rather meetings, and was considered a convinced antimilitarist. In 1912, he was noted as a less militant anarchist, and the following year in Amiens, his home was raided. The police found antimilitarist propaganda there. The following year, he was kept on the B file list.

== Legacy ==
=== Police mugshot ===
His police mugshot is part of the collections of the Metropolitan Museum of Art (MET).

== Bibliography ==
- Bouhey, Vivien (2008), Les Anarchistes contre la République [The Anarchists against the Republic] (in French), Rennes: Presses universitaires de Rennes (PUR)
- Petit, Dominique (2024), SEGARD Emilien, Alfred, Paris: Le Maitron
- Dupuy, Rolf (2025), "SEGARD, Émilien, Alfred", Dictionnaire international des militants anarchistes, Paris
