= Vers-sur-Selle =

- Commune
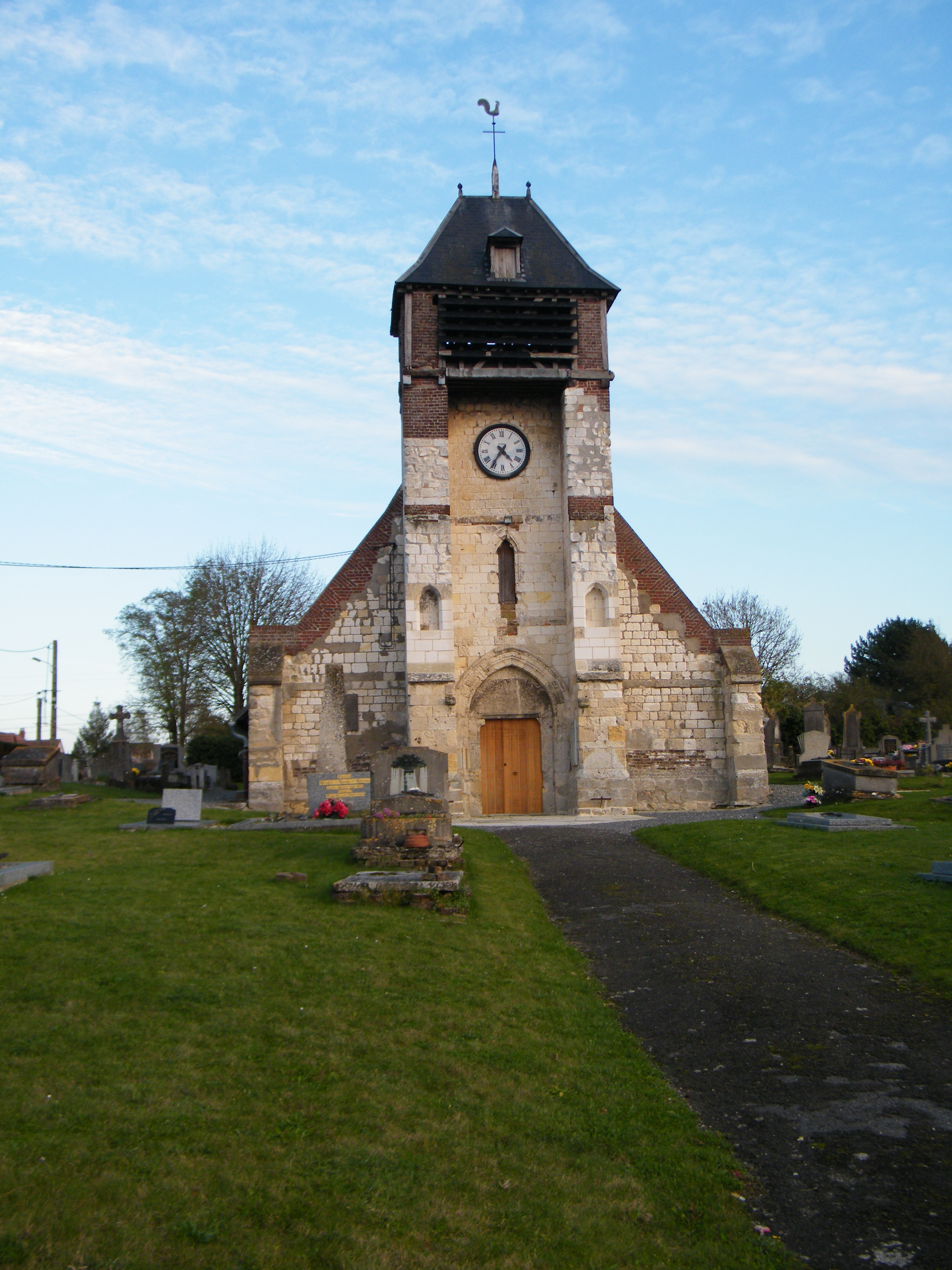
- The church in Vers-sur-Selle

- Coat of arms
- Location of Vers-sur-Selle
- Location within France Location within Hauts-de-France
- Coordinates: 49°50′32″N 2°13′56″E
- Country: France
- Region: Hauts-de-France
- Department: Somme
- Arrondissement: Amiens
- Canton: Amiens-7
- Intercommunality: Amiens Métropole

Government
  - Mayor (2022–2026): Jean-Luc Jeuniaux
- Area^{1}: 11.18 km^{2} (4.32 sq mi)
- Elevation: 57 m (187 ft)
- Highest elevation: 107 m (351 ft)
- Lowest elevation: 33 m (108 ft)
- Population (2023): 929
  - Density: 83.1/km^{2} (215/sq mi)
- Time zone: UTC+01:00 (CET)
  - Summer (DST): UTC+02:00 (CEST)
- INSEE/Postal code: 80791 /80480
- ^{1} French Land Register data, which excludes lakes, ponds, glaciers > 1 km^{2} (0.386 sq mi or 247 acres) and river estuaries.

Vers-sur-Selle (French pronunciation: [vɛʁ syʁ sɛl], literally Vers on Selle) is a commune in the Somme department in Hauts-de-France in northern France.

== Geography ==
The commune is situated 4 miles (6 km) southwest of Amiens, on the D98 road in the valley of the Selle river.

== History ==
- Prehistoric times: single-sided flint tools and the remains of mammoths have been found in the local gravel.
- Neolithic period: some graves were discovered during building work.
- Middle Ages: Merovingian burials were found in the valley, the remains were unearthed during the construction of the A16.

In 1358, Vers was ravaged by Charles II of Navarre.
In 1376, three residents burnt down the tithe barn and were hanged in front of the church.
In 1426, the church and village were razed by English troops.
In 1472, Charles the Bold subjected Vers to "blood and fire".

- Before the revolution : in 1617, the leper hospital was closed.

In 1730, Nicolas Deleau, publican, was fined 75 sols for selling drinks on Sundays and feast days.

== Population ==
Historical population
| Year | Pop. | ±% p.a. |
|---|---|---|
| 1968 | 481 | — |
| 1975 | 638 | +4.12% |
| 1982 | 733 | +2.00% |
| 1990 | 736 | +0.05% |
| 1999 | 768 | +0.47% |
| 2007 | 681 | −1.49% |
| 2012 | 732 | +1.45% |
| 2017 | 735 | +0.08% |
| 2023 | 929 | +3.98% |
Source: INSEE

== Places of interest ==
- The sixteenth century church of Saint Rémi. The door dates from 1238. In 1472, the church was subjected to considerable devastation. Several restorations have since been made.

== See also ==
- Communes of the Somme department
