= Pont-de-Metz =

- Commune
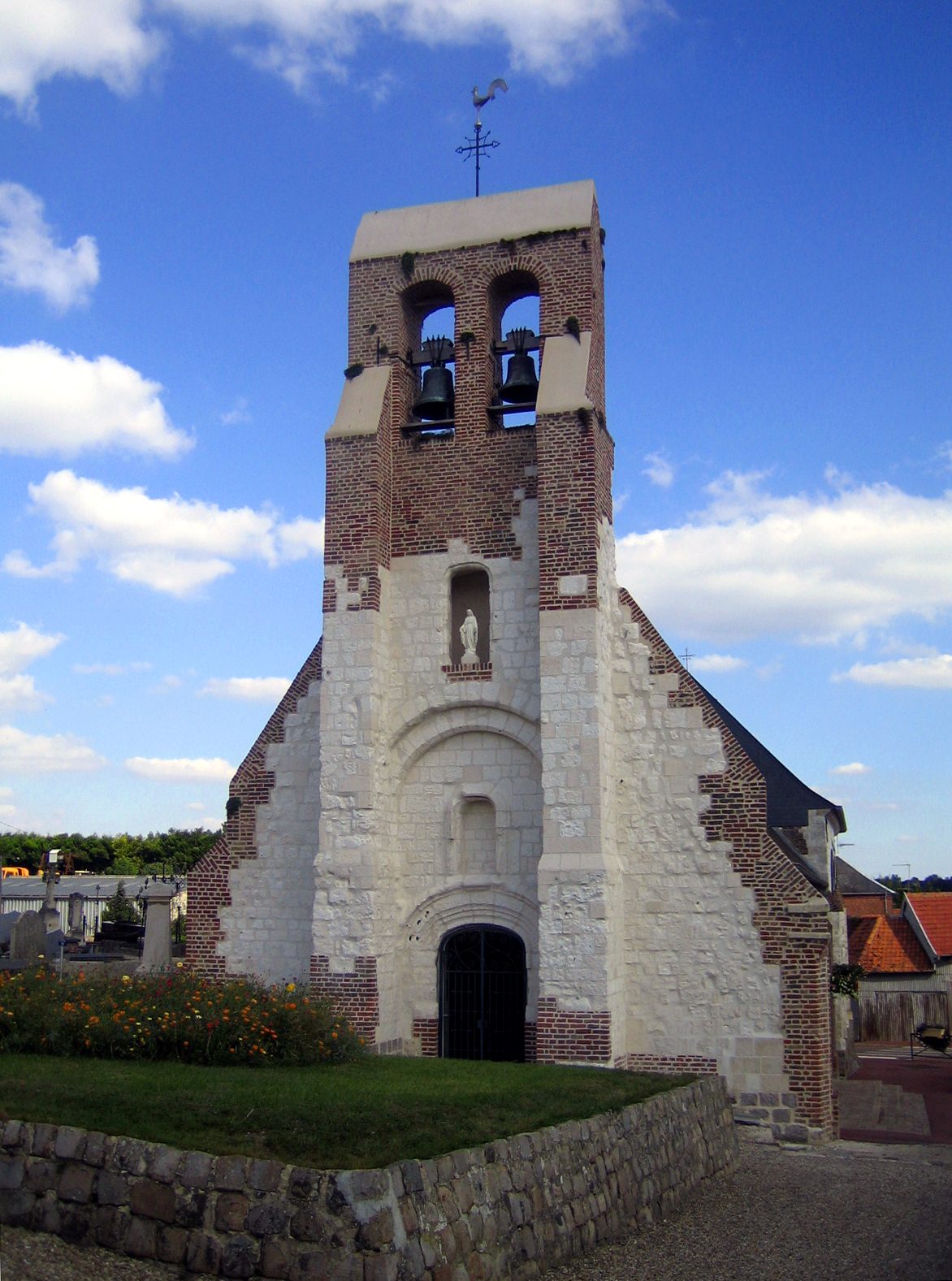
- The church in Pont-de-Metz
- Location of Pont-de-Metz
- Location within France Location within Hauts-de-France
- Coordinates: 49°52′50″N 2°14′34″E
- Country: France
- Region: Hauts-de-France
- Department: Somme
- Arrondissement: Amiens
- Canton: Amiens-7
- Intercommunality: Amiens Métropole

Government
  - Mayor (2020–2026): Loïc Bulant
- Area^{1}: 7.69 km^{2} (2.97 sq mi)
- Elevation: 28 m (92 ft)
- Highest elevation: 85 m (279 ft)
- Lowest elevation: 22 m (72 ft)
- Population (2023): 2,425
  - Density: 315/km^{2} (817/sq mi)
- Time zone: UTC+01:00 (CET)
  - Summer (DST): UTC+02:00 (CEST)
- INSEE/Postal code: 80632 /80480
- ^{1} French Land Register data, which excludes lakes, ponds, glaciers > 1 km^{2} (0.386 sq mi or 247 acres) and river estuaries.

Pont-de-Metz (French pronunciation: [pɔ̃ də mɛs]; Picard: Pont-Mès) is a commune in the Somme department in Hauts-de-France in northern France.

== Geography ==
The commune is situated on the D405 road, less than 3 miles (5 km) southwest from the centre of Amiens.

== Population ==
Historical population
Year	Pop.	±% p.a.
1968	1,064	—
1975	1,028	−0.49%
1982	1,231	+2.61%
1990	1,494	+2.45%
1999	1,656	+1.15%
2007	1,830	+1.26%
2012	2,387	+5.46%
2017	2,467	+0.66%
2023	2,425	−0.29%
Source: INSEE

== Places of interest ==
- Church of Saint Cyr and Sainte-Julitte. Recently restored in the 21st century.
- The war memorial, at the entrance to the graveyard.

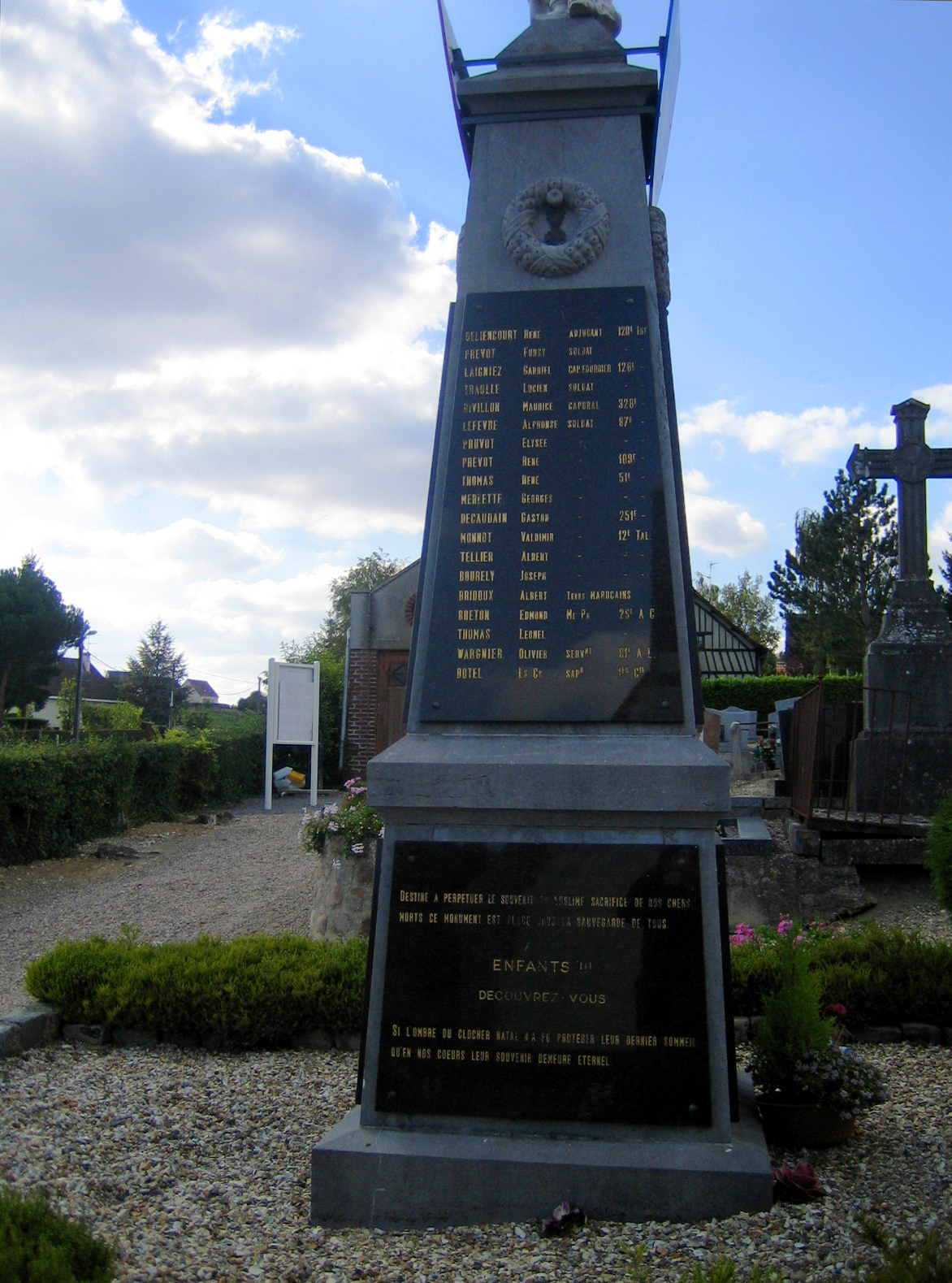
The war memorial

== See also ==
- Communes of the Somme department
