= Élisée Bastard =

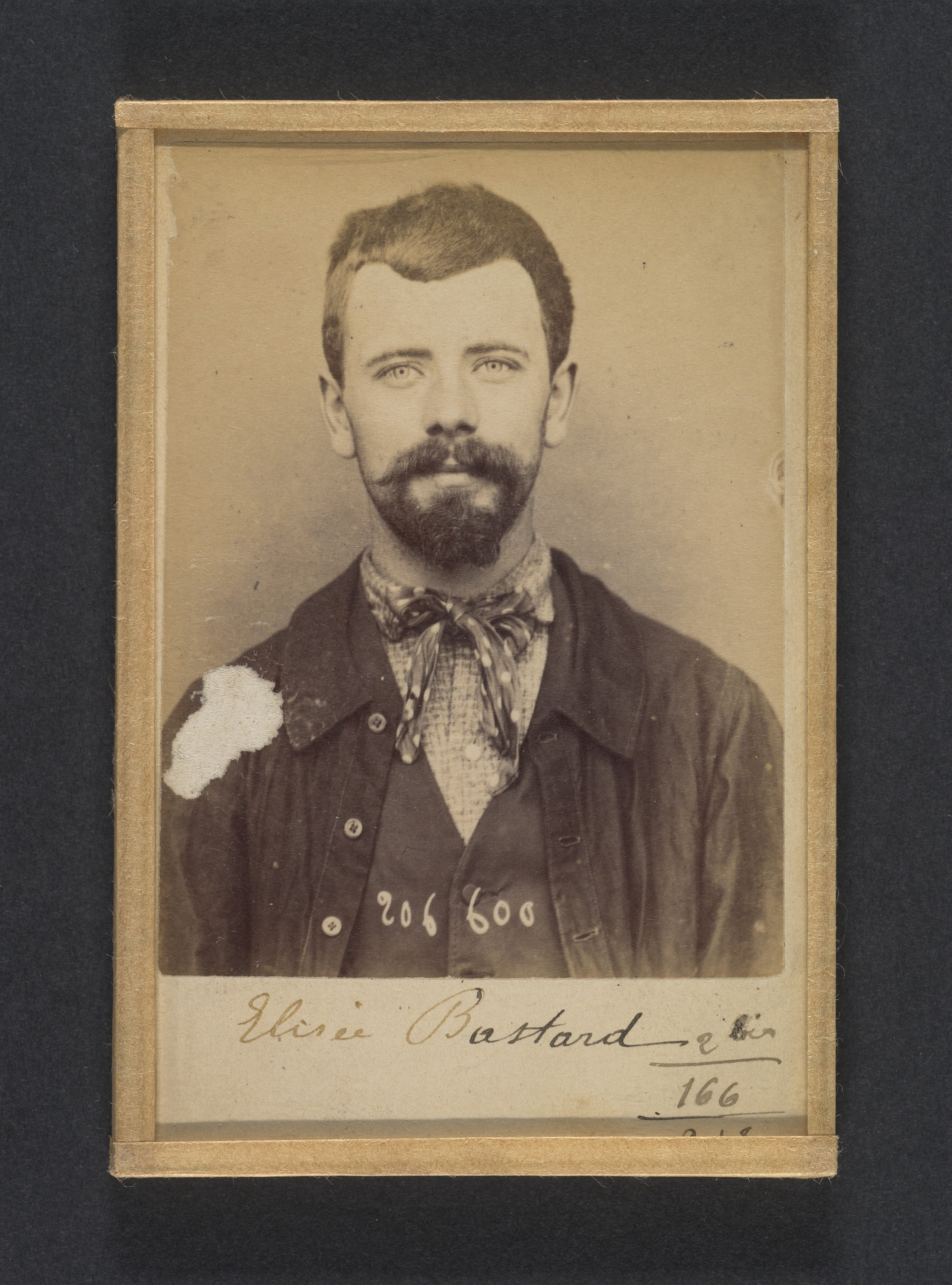
- Élisée Bastard's mugshot taken by Alphonse Bertillon in 1893
- Born: January 20, 1871; Bornel, France
- Died: January 4, 1957 (aged 85); Bourganeuf, France
- Citizenship: France
- Occupations: worker anarchist
- Movement: Anarchism

Élisée Bastard, born on 20 January 1871 in Bornel and dead on 4 January 1957 in Bourganeuf, was a French butcher, polisher, and anarchist. Acquitted during the Trial of the Thirty, he was a notable figure in French anarchist circles in the 1890s, particularly in the northern suburbs of Paris and Saint-Denis.

Born into a working-class and anarchist family, Bastard joined the movement in his late teens, beginning to associate with other anarchists from Saint-Denis, such as Philogone Segard and Charles 'Cookie' Simon. He undertook a number of actions, fled the authorities several times, and was frequently arrested by the French police before being implicated in the Trial of the Thirty, a political trial targeting the anarchist movement in France—from which he was acquitted. Bastard continued his anarchist activism in the following years, became wealthy, and died in 1957.

His police mugshot is part of the collections of the Metropolitan Museum of Art (MET).

== Biography ==
=== Birth and youth ===
Élisée Joseph Michel Bastard was born on 20 January 1871 in Bornel, in the Oise department. He was the son of Louise Adelaïde Michel and Joseph Bastard, a polisher and anarchist himself. His parents then settled in Saint-Denis, where Bastard grew up.

=== Anarchist militancy ===
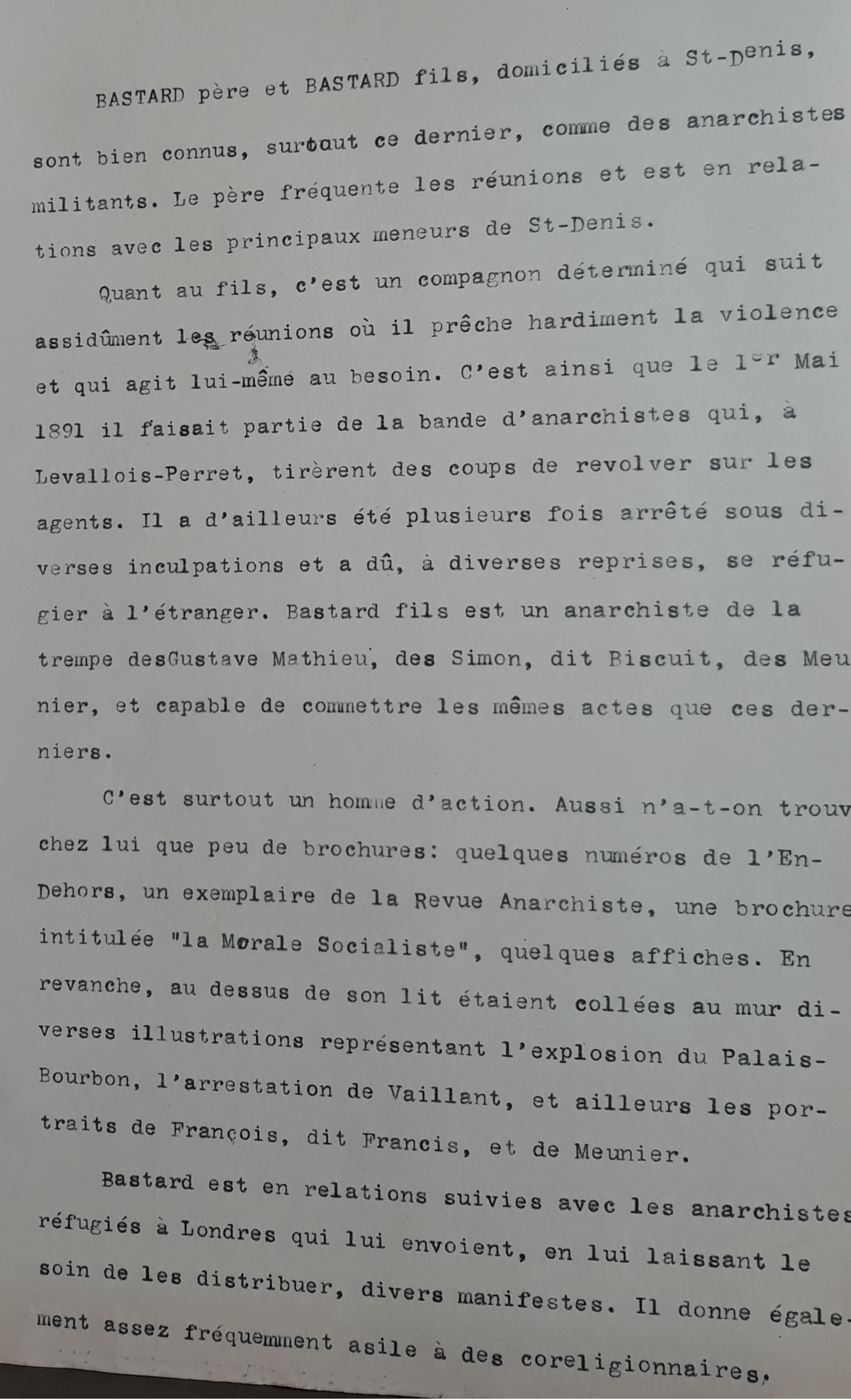
Report on Élisée Bastard and his father, Joseph Bastard, by French police (courtesy of Archives anarchistes)

On 24 May 1889, he was sentenced to six days in prison for stealing a beefsteak from his boss while working as a butcher. From the early 1890s, he was registered by the authorities as a highly active anarchist in the Saint-Denis groups. These groups were known for their young, working-class, and relatively radical members, who advocated for ideas such as individual reclamation and propaganda by the deed. According to Constance Bantman, the Bastard family, who lived on the same street as other anarchist activists like David Altérant, was a family that actively shared its anarchist ideas.

In February 1891, he was arrested along with Nestor Ferrière, François Collion, Henry Decamps, Charles Galau, François Pernin, and Arthur Voyez for protesting a military service lottery in Saint-Denis. Their group allegedly shouted, 'Down with the homeland! Long live anarchy!' and all were acquitted except for Decamps, who was sentenced to fifteen days in prison.

He was associated with Philogone Segard and participated in the Clichy affair, where he allegedly shot at police officers, according to the testimony of informant X2. Bastard then managed to escape, traveling through Belgium before reaching London, where he took refuge for a time and reunited with his father, who was also in exile. In October of the same year, the anarchist returned to France, stayed with fellow activist Émile 'Little Cat' Hamelin, in Reims, and then came back to Saint-Denis, where he re-formed the city's anarchist group with Segard and Dutheil.

He himself didn't show up for his military draft and once again protested the lottery in Saint-Denis in February 1892. He was arrested again for protesting the arrest of an anarchist distributing copies of the newspaper Le Conscrit, before being released. Following the Soisy robbery, where anarchists from Saint-Denis stole dynamite that would be used by Ravachol for his attacks, his home was raided, but the authorities found nothing.

Bastard returned to London, helping Decamps' brother, a deserter, flee France. Then, in late March 1892, back in Paris, he was arrested by police for his connections with Ravachol and Charles 'Cookie' Simon, and was suspected of being the main perpetrator of the Lobau bombing—an attack carried out by other anarchists with whom he had no connection. The authorities also suspected him of a robbery in Nantes. He stated that he only knew Ravachol by sight and defended Simon, saying he was a poor young man whose release he hoped for. Bastard was released after proving he was not involved in these affairs, but his boss at the Hotchkiss factory fired him.

The anarchist then joined Désiré Pauwels during his exile, worked for a time near Nancy, and then returned to Saint-Denis, where he participated in a campaign to help Jean-Baptiste Foret, an anarchist who had been sentenced to death.

In early 1893, informant X2 recommended that Bastard and Philogone Segard be closely monitored, considering them both to be very dangerous anarchists who were aware of a number of planned attacks or actions. They were said to always be armed, spread false rumors about their activities, and move erratically.

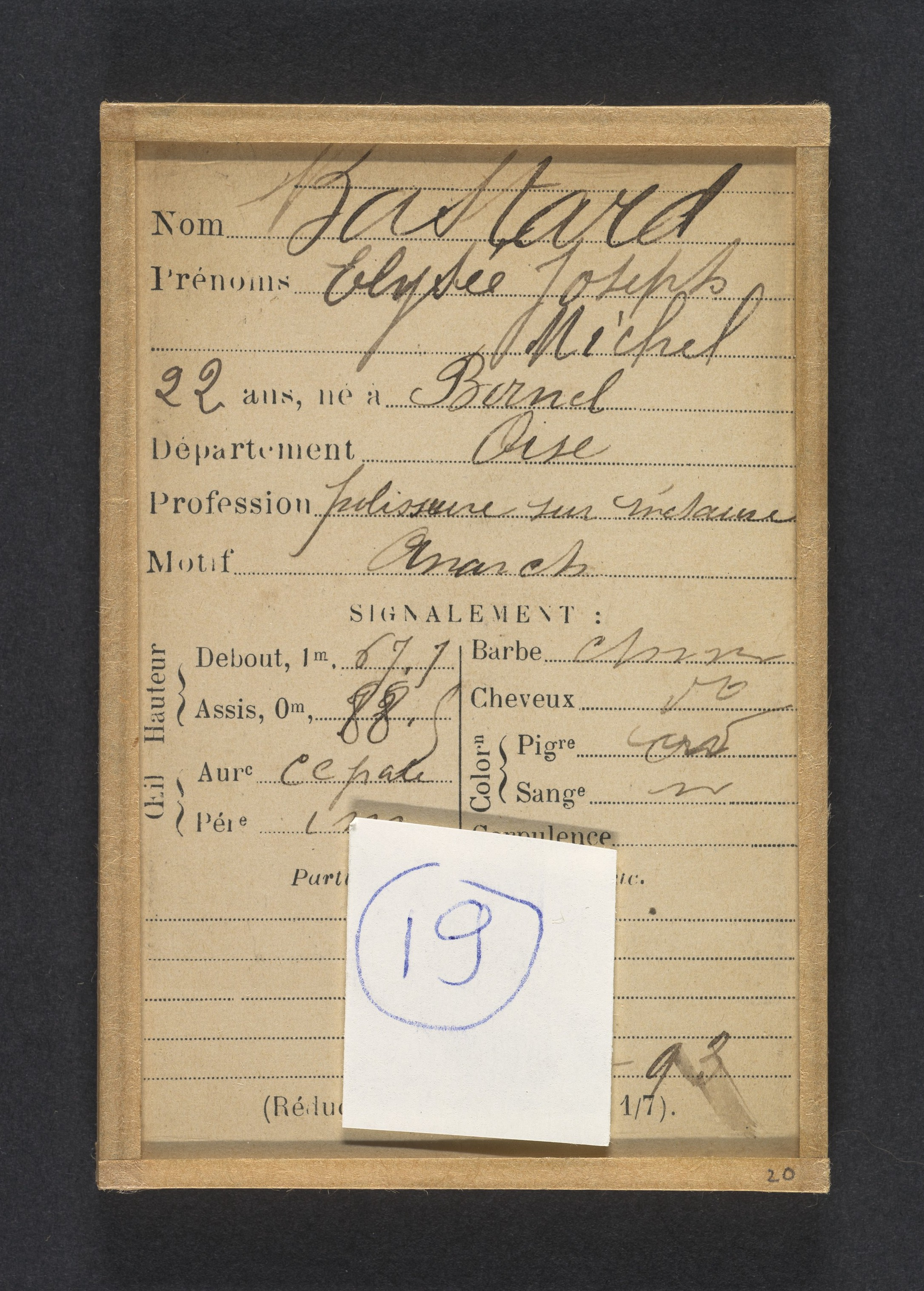
Bertillon's identification file for Bastard (1893)

In August of the same year, he ran as an abstentionist anarchist candidate in the legislative elections against Maurice Barrès, a Boulangist candidate with great influence on the far right in France. Bastard and his comrades went to post anarchist posters near the private mansion where Barrès lived. Barrès sent his servants to tear down the posters, and they were struck by the anarchists. The far-right politician decided to press charges, and they were arrested. He accused them of trying to loot his mansion. The group only received light sentences; Bastard was sentenced to six days in prison and a fifty-franc fine for assault and battery.

He supported the Carmaux-Bons Enfants bombing and Pauli Pallas at an anarchist meeting in October 1893, and criticized the police informants in the room, advising them to quit their job and become workers as soon as possible. In December of the same year, he supported Léon Léauthier and defended the actions of Ravachol.

Bastard was targeted during the repression of January and February 1894, along with his father, with both being arrested and having their homes raided. The police found copies of l'Endehors, illustrations of the National Assembly bombing, the arrest of Auguste Vaillant, and portraits of Jean-Pierre François and Théodule Meunier at his home.

During this period, the anarchist associated with Rudolf Rocker, who described him as:

One of the best-known anarchist speakers of that period and an excellent comrade.

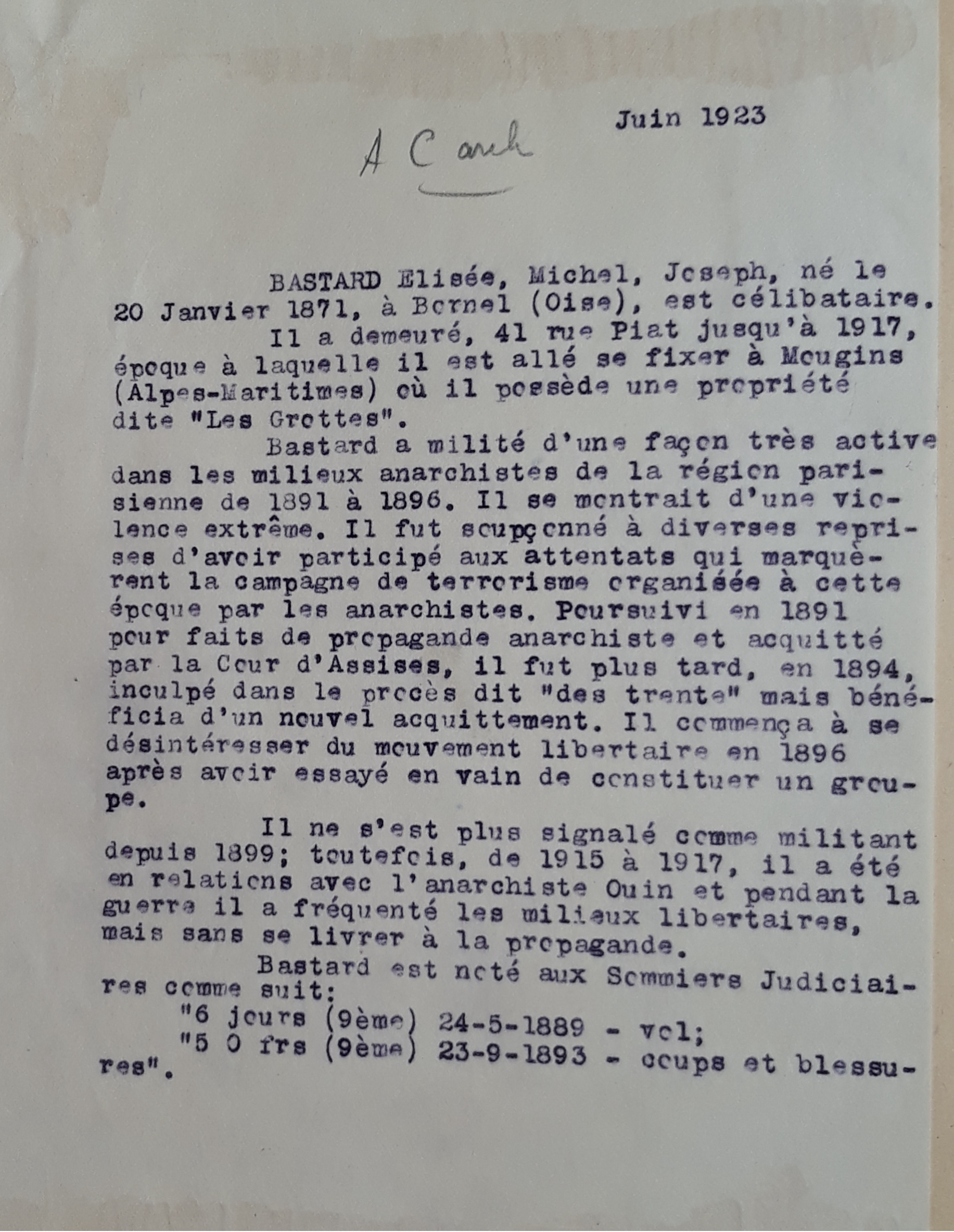
Report on Élisée Bastard by French police (1923) (courtesy of Archives anarchistes)

Following the 20 February bombings, likely committed by Désiré Pauwels, whom he knew, the police searched for and tried to arrest him, but were unsuccessful. He left a note at his home saying, 'I regret not being able to stay at home to receive you as you deserve, but my mistress, Liberty, demands me elsewhere'. Bastard was arrested the next day at Louis Duprat's bar while joking with Léontine 'Titine' Borreman. He was not recognized by witnesses of the attack.

Bastard was then targeted by the Trial of the Thirty, a political trial that mixed figures from anarchism in France with illegalists. The trial aimed to convict the anarchist defendants for being part of a common plot or conspiracy. Like almost all the accused, he was acquitted by the jury.

=== Later years and death ===
The anarchist then went to the United Kingdom, to London, before returning to France. In 1913, police noted his presence in Normandy, near Rouen, where he had become wealthy and was able to buy several properties, including a villa. However, he remained on file as a convinced anarchist and was reportedly seeking to undertake propaganda actions against the army. In 1917, while in Mougins with his wife, Gabrielle Marie Lemaire, he was still noted as a subscriber to a communist newspaper and a convinced anarchist.

He died on 4 January 1957 in Bourganeuf.

== Legacy ==
=== Police mugshot ===
His police mugshot is part of the collections of the Metropolitan Museum of Art (MET).

== Bibliography ==
- Bach Jensen, Richard (2015). The Battle against Anarchist Terrorism: An International History, 1878–1934. Cambridge: Cambridge University Press (CUP). ISBN 978-1-107-03405-1.
- Bouhey, Vivien (2008), Les Anarchistes contre la République [The Anarchists against the Republic] (in French), Rennes: Presses universitaires de Rennes (PUR)
- Davranche, Guillaume (2024), BASTARD Élisée, Michel, Joseph, Paris: Le Maitron
- Dupuy, Rolf (2025), "BASTARD, Élisée, Joseph, Michel "François PICHANCOURT"", Dictionnaire international des militants anarchistes, Paris
