= Canton of Amiens-7 =

Coordinates: 49.89°N 2.28°E

Amiens-7
- Canton
- Interactive map of Amiens-7
- Country: France
- Region: Hauts-de-France
- Department: Somme
- No. of communes: {{{nbcomm}}}
- Population (2023): 30,203
- INSEE code: 80 12

The Canton of Amiens-7 is a canton situated in the department of the Somme and in the Hauts-de-France region of northern France.

== Geography ==
The canton is organised around the commune of Amiens in the arrondissement of Amiens.

== Composition ==
At the French canton reorganisation which came into effect in March 2015, the canton was expanded from 2 to 5 communes:

- Amiens (western part)
- Pont-de-Metz
- Saleux
- Salouël
- Vers-sur-Selles

== See also ==
- Arrondissements of the Somme department
- Cantons of the Somme department
- Communes of the Somme department
