= Saleux =

- Commune
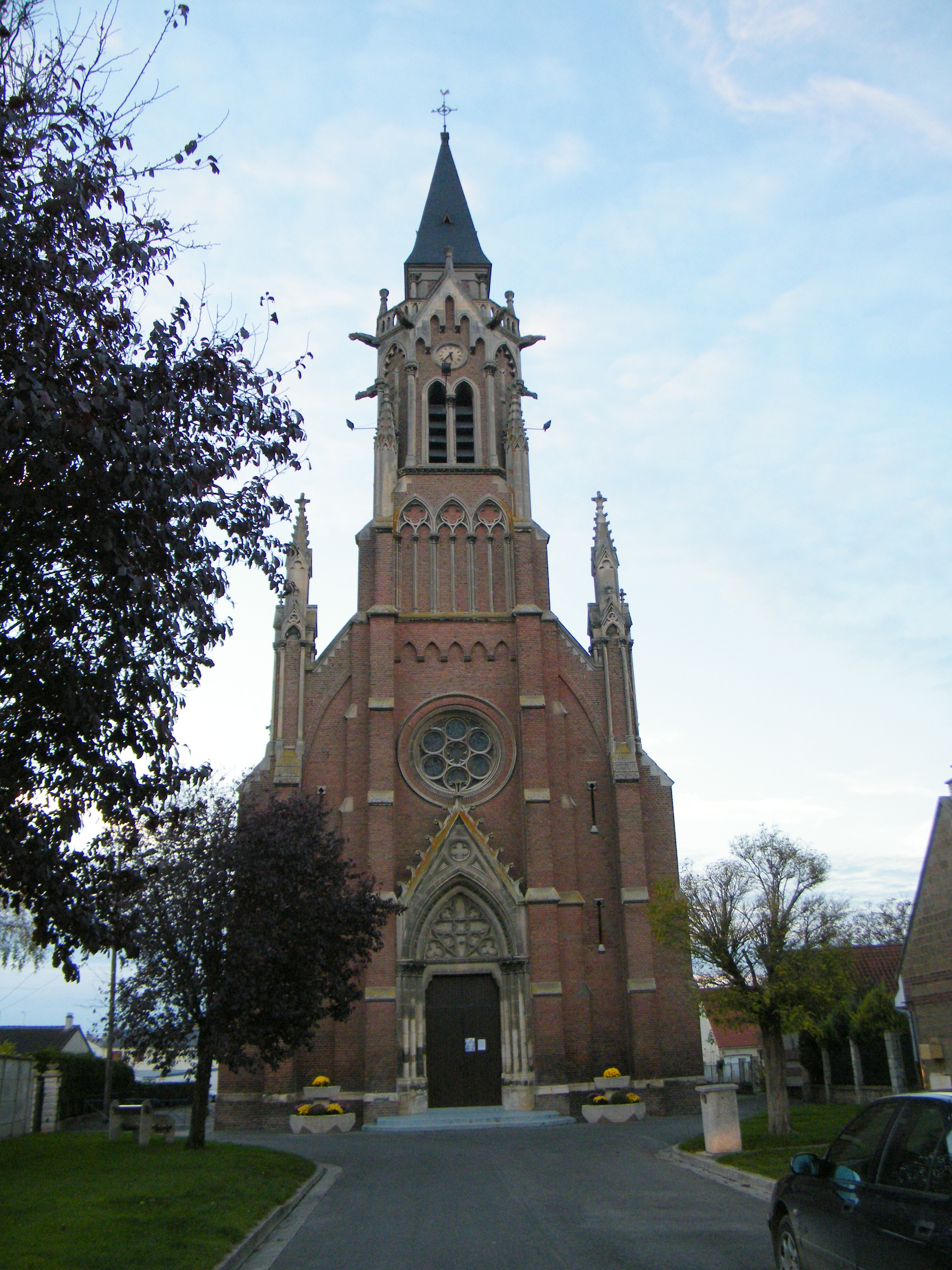
- The church in Saleux

- Coat of arms
- Location of Saleux
- Location within France Location within Hauts-de-France
- Coordinates: 49°51′33″N 2°14′20″E
- Country: France
- Region: Hauts-de-France
- Department: Somme
- Arrondissement: Amiens
- Canton: Amiens-7
- Intercommunality: Amiens Métropole

Government
  - Mayor (2020–2026): Isabelle Rambour
- Area^{1}: 8.02 km^{2} (3.10 sq mi)
- Elevation: 44 m (144 ft)
- Highest elevation: 116 m (381 ft)
- Lowest elevation: 30 m (98 ft)
- Population (2023): 2,739
  - Density: 342/km^{2} (885/sq mi)
- Time zone: UTC+01:00 (CET)
  - Summer (DST): UTC+02:00 (CEST)
- INSEE/Postal code: 80724 /80480
- Website: http://www.ville-saleux.fr/
- ^{1} French Land Register data, which excludes lakes, ponds, glaciers > 1 km^{2} (0.386 sq mi or 247 acres) and river estuaries.

Saleux (French pronunciation: [salø]) is a commune in the Somme department in Hauts-de-France in northern France. The baritone Numa Auguez (1847–1903) was born in Saleux.

== Geography ==
Saleux is situated on the D8 road, some 4 miles (6 km) southwest of, and a suburb of Amiens.

== Population ==
Historical population
Year	Pop.	±% p.a.
1968	1,429	—
1975	1,856	+3.81%
1982	2,069	+1.56%
1990	2,488	+2.33%
1999	2,493	+0.02%
2007	2,391	−0.52%
2012	2,546	+1.26%
2017	2,846	+2.25%
2023	2,739	−0.64%
Source: INSEE

== Culture ==
=== People born in Saleux ===
- Philogone Segard, radical anarchist from the Ère des attentats.

== See also ==
- Communes of the Somme department
