= Salouël =

- Commune
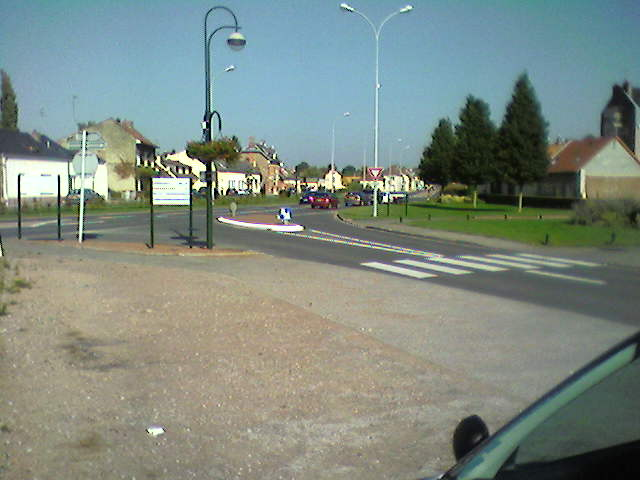
- The centre of Salouël

- Coat of arms
- Location of Salouël
- Location within France Location within Hauts-de-France
- Coordinates: 49°52′15″N 2°14′35″E
- Country: France
- Region: Hauts-de-France
- Department: Somme
- Arrondissement: Amiens
- Canton: Amiens-7
- Intercommunality: Amiens Métropole

Government
  - Mayor (2020–2026): Franck Darragon
- Area^{1}: 4.58 km^{2} (1.77 sq mi)
- Elevation: 32 m (105 ft)
- Highest elevation: 105 m (344 ft)
- Lowest elevation: 27 m (89 ft)
- Population (2023): 4,179
  - Density: 912/km^{2} (2,360/sq mi)
- Time zone: UTC+01:00 (CET)
  - Summer (DST): UTC+02:00 (CEST)
- INSEE/Postal code: 80725 /80480
- ^{1} French Land Register data, which excludes lakes, ponds, glaciers > 1 km^{2} (0.386 sq mi or 247 acres) and river estuaries.

Salouël (French pronunciation: [salwɛl]; Picard: Saloué) is a commune in the Somme department in Hauts-de-France in northern France.

== Geography ==
The commune is situated 3 miles (5 km) southwest of Amiens, between the N29 and D608 roads and a suburb of Amiens.

== Population ==
Historical population
Year	Pop.	±% p.a.
1968	2,004	—
1975	2,788	+4.83%
1982	3,061	+1.34%
1990	3,679	+2.33%
1999	4,162	+1.38%
2007	4,363	+0.59%
2012	4,033	−1.56%
2017	3,979	−0.27%
2023	4,179	+0.82%
Source: INSEE

== History ==
Evidence of Gallo-Roman habitation can be seen from the air, featuring overlapping enclosures and a big farm building or villa. Human remains and three tombs dating back to the Merovingian era have been discovered within the commune boundaries.
In the early Middle Ages, vines were cultivated in Picardie, and in this region in particular, as testified at Salouël by the parcel of land known as Les Vignettes.
In 1342 a fulling mill was in use on the river Selle, to process woollen cloth, which had previously been done manually.
Originally, Salouël was part of the parish town of Saleux. The separation was made by imperial decree on December 11, 1864.
Its cantonal allocation has changed since 1790: first integrated into the canton of Bovelles, then to Sains and since 1879 the canton of Boves.
With Salouël being so close to Amiens, it wasn't just involved in rural activity over the centuries, unlike most of the surrounding communes. Since the Middle Ages, the development of craft industries and small workshops occupied most of the population.
After the Second World War, and in particular since the years 1965–1970, the commune has been transformed by the successive establishment of the campus of a university and a large hospital.

== Places of interest ==
- The Church
- Water mills

== See also ==
- Communes of the Somme department
