= Repression of early 1894 =

Series of repressive acts by the French Republic in 1894

- Part of Ère des attentats
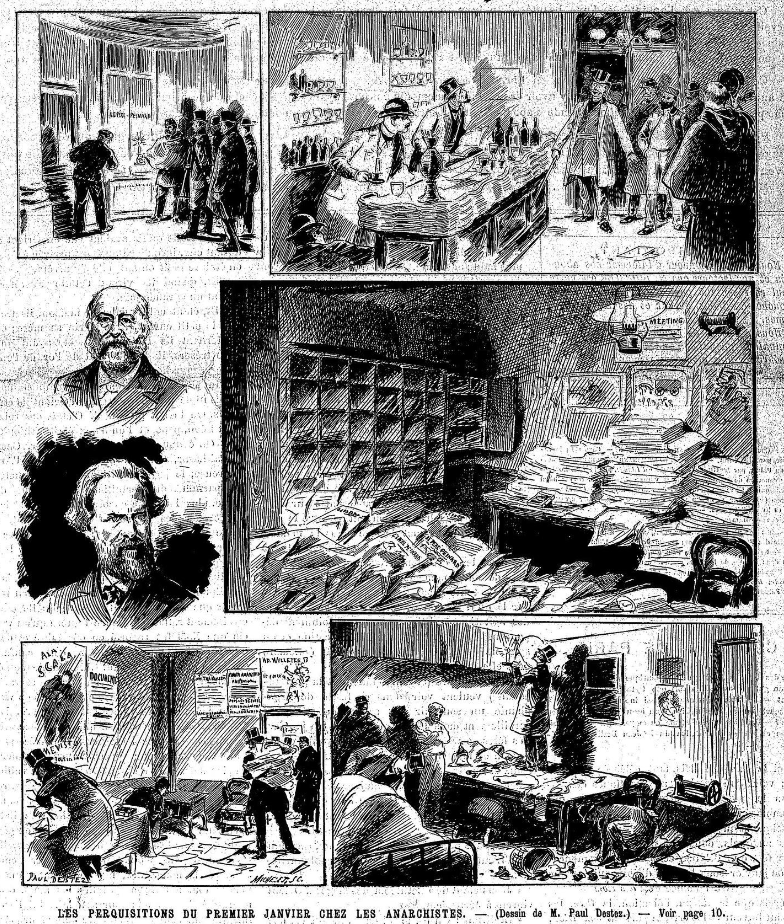
- Depiction of the 1 January 1894 raids in L'Univers illustré (6 January 1894), showing police operations at anarchist locations including Le Père Peinard offices and Reclus brothers' portraits
- Date: January 1, 1894
- Location: France, French Algeria
- Goals: interrumpting anarchist attacks, destroying the anarchist movement in France
- Methods: police raids, planting of evidence, summary arrests, state surveillance
- Result: Arrested and raided thousands of anarchists with limited results and radicalized some that were still at large, effectively pushing to a resume of anarchist attacks

Parties
(France) France; French colonial administration French army French police	Anarchists

Lead figures
Sadi Carnot; David Raynal	

Casualties
- Arrested: 50-60 the first day, 284 arrested and kept in prison without trial after the whole period
- Damage: 552 homes raided the first day alone

The repression of early 1894 was an episode of the Ère des attentats (1892–1894), during which France engaged in significant state repression against anarchists. The passage of the lois scélérates ('villainous laws') in December 1893, following the National Assembly bombing, granted French political and police authorities extensive powers to combat anarchists. Using these laws, they launched a large-scale crackdown, employing both legal and extra-legal means to achieve their goals. Thousands of raids and arrests were carried out across France and its colonies, anarchist newspapers were banned, and a nationwide "manhunt for anarchists" was declared. The French anarchist leagues were heavily targeted during the repression. The execution of Auguste Vaillant on 5 February 1894, after president Sadi Carnot refused to grant him his pardon, was a defining moment of this repression, the most severe since the Paris Commune (1871).

Rather than stopping the attacks, this episode radicalized those anarchists who evaded arrest, who were often the most dangerous ones, and drove them to seek revenge. Figures like Émile Henry, Désiré Pauwels, and Célestin Nat responded with attacks of varying scope and intensity. On 24 June 1894, Sante Caserio assassinated Sadi Carnot in Lyon. This vicious circle of repression and retaliatory attacks began to draw criticism from some republicans, such as Georges Clemenceau.

While the repression had limited success, the measures influenced other European states, such as Italy and Spain, which adopted similar policies, deporting or arresting thousands of anarchists.

== History ==
=== Context ===
In the 19th century, anarchism emerged and took shape in Europe before spreading. Anarchists advocated a struggle against all forms of domination perceived as unjust including economic domination brought forth by capitalism. They were particularly opposed to the State, seen as the organization that legitimized these dominations through its police, army and propaganda.

In France, relations between the authorities and anarchists grew tense due to the severe repression that anarchists faced in the 1880s. After the Fourmies massacre and the Clichy affair (1891), a number of anarchists in France decided to engage in terrorist actions against those they held responsible for the repression they endured, launching the Ère des attentats (1892–1894). One of the first terrorists of this period, François Koenigstein (Ravachol), who targeted the magistrates involved in the Clichy affair, was arrested and sent to the guillotine on 11 July 1892, transforming him into a martyr and hero of the anarchist cause. In December 1893, Auguste Vaillant, seeking revenge for the misery he endured, carried out the National Assembly bombing, throwing a bomb into the chamber without causing any fatalities.

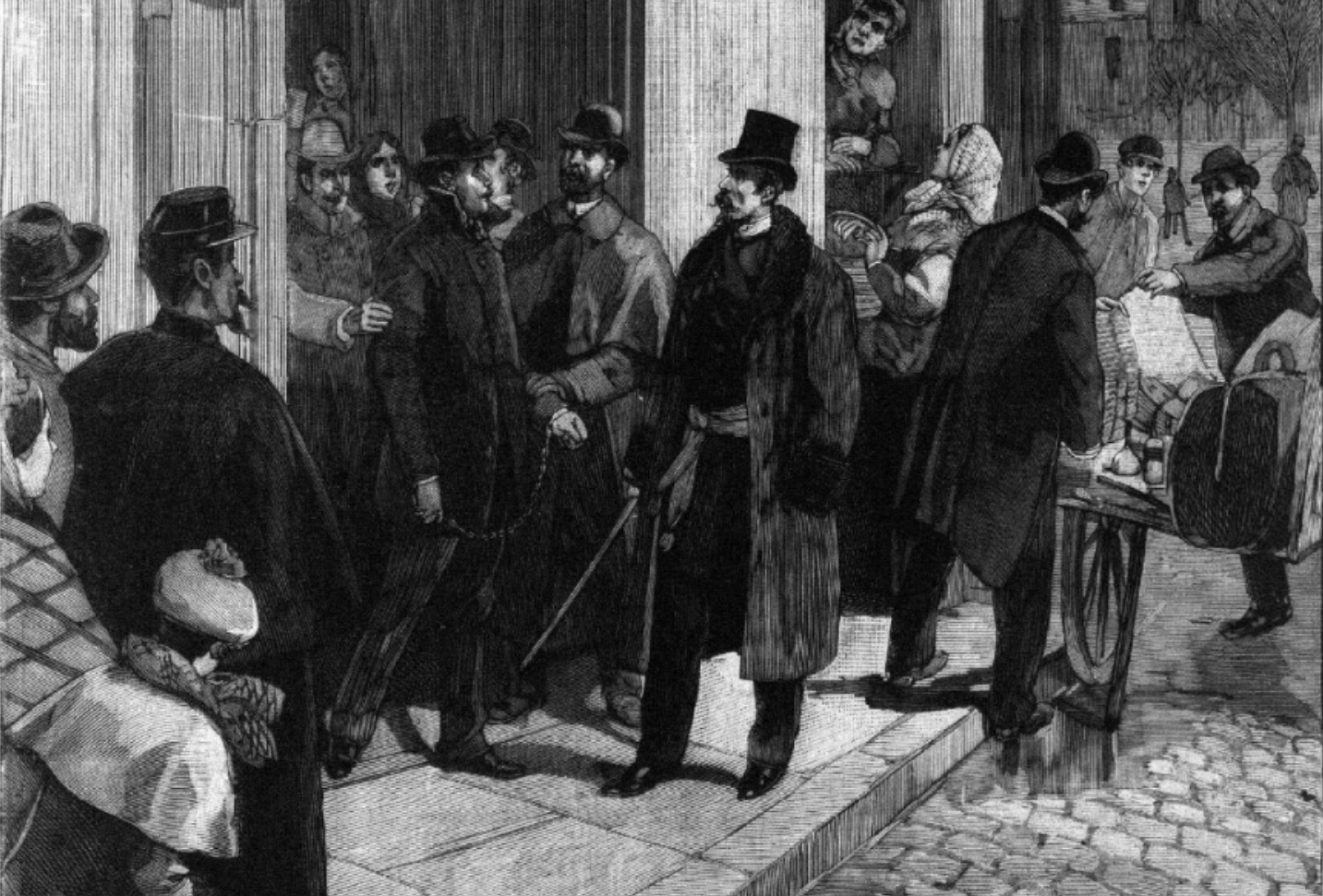
Representation of an anarchist being arrested in Le Petit Parisien: supplément illustré (4 April 1894)

Quickly arrested, this final attack served as a pretext for French authorities to pass the first two lois scélérates ('villainous laws')—a set of repressive laws later joined by a third in late summer 1894—explicitly targeting the anarchist movement. These laws restricted freedom of speech, weakened the presumption of innocence, facilitated police raids, expanded state surveillance, and normalized preventive arrests. Both the authorities and the French press widely promoted the idea that anarchists were part of a vast international conspiracy, using this narrative to justify their repression.

=== Repression ===
During this "hunt for anarchists", the French authorities began compiling lists of individuals to be searched; in Paris alone, more than five hundred names appeared on the list of French anarchists, not including foreigners, who were placed on a separate list. The French Minister of the Interior, David Raynal, requested lists of all individuals who were friends or affiliates of anarchists, even if they were not anarchists themselves. This marked the most repressive action taken by the French Republic since the Paris Commune (1871).

The raids they were about to conduct could be conducted with illegal methods; authorities sometimes planted incriminating evidence in an anarchist's home before conducting a raid the next morning, "discovering" the planted evidence, and using it to secure conviction of their targets.

==== 1 and 2 January 1894 ====
Cities were raids and arrests were conducted across France in January 1894

On the night of 31 December to 1 January 1894, French police officers were ordered to be on standby. This date was chosen to catch the targeted anarchists off guard and prevent them from preparing for the searches. To maintain the secrecy of the operation, each commissaire received a series of sealed envelopes at 4 A.M. containing the names of those to be raided. They then opened them, took note of the names and addresses, and prepared to launch the operation, expecting to uncover large caches of weapons or explosives.

At 6 A.M., the French police launched hundreds of raids targeting anarchists across France. That day alone, a total of 552 raids were conducted, including 50–60 in Paris. The police raided the home of Élisée Reclus in Sèvres and arrested his seventy years old brother, Élie Reclus, in Paris, though he was released a few hours later. The fact that Reclus was targeted sparked outrage among part of the French intellectual world. The police also raided Jean Grave, Michel Antoine, Élisée Bastard, Louis Léveillé, Henri Étiévant, Louis Duprat, Georges Brunet, Émile Pouget, Philogone and Émilien Segard or Sébastien Faure.

On the same day, other cities were also searched. In Île-de-France, the police carried out similar operations in Puteaux, Nanterre, Courbevoie, Colombes, Sèvres, Asnières, Villeneuve-la-Garenne, and Levallois-Perret. Dozens of searches were also conducted in Lyon and Nice, as well as in Colombier and Commentry in the Allier region.

Map of Paris raids on 1st January

In Brest, as the raids began, the gendarmes surrounded Régis Meunier's residence with bayonets fixed. They arrested seven anarchists—four men and three women—before releasing them later that day due to a lack of evidence. In Rouen and its suburbs, the police carried out around thirty raids and arrested a militant for writing a letter of congratulations to Vaillant. Additionally, other raids took place in Saint-Quentin (25), Saintes (2), Roubaix, Montpellier, Cannes, Valence, Belfort, Montluçon, Saint-Étienne, Amiens, Troyes, and other French cities. Decazeville, Angers, Les Ponts-de-Cé, and Trélazé were also affected by the searches.

Alongside these raids, the police conducted dozens of arrests. They arrested Louis Léveillé, one of those convicted and beaten in the Clichy affair, Henri Étiévant, Élisée Bastard, and the Dutchman Alexandre Cohen, who was deported.

The results of the searches on 1 and 2 January 1894 were highly disappointing for the authorities. Instead of uncovering large caches of weapons and explosives, the police found almost nothing in most cases. Over the two days, they recovered only a few handguns and a canon shell. Around sixty anarchists were arrested, but nearly all were released the same day due to the absence of incriminating evidence. The operation appeared poorly planned. In one instance, police officers mistakenly raided the home of an undercover officer. He greeted his colleagues at the door with friendliness—only for them to arrest him anyway and figure their mistake late.

Moreover, the searches inadvertently revealed to the anarchists the full list of individuals spied upon by the police.

==== Following and generalization of the repression ====
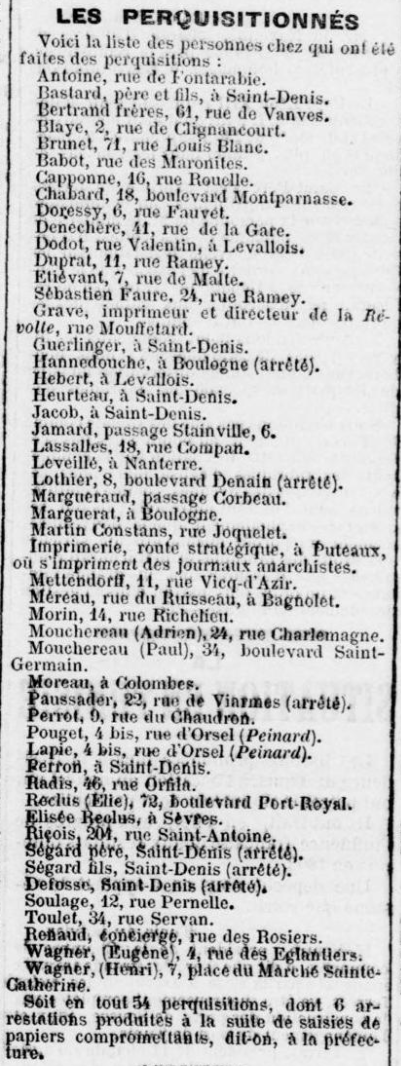
List of those raided in Île-de-France (region around Paris), the list includes among others Jean Grave, Michel Antoine, Élisée Bastard, Louis Léveillé, Henri Étiévant, Louis Duprat, Georges Brunet, Émile Pouget, the Reclus brothers, Philogone and Émilien Segard or Sébastien Faure in L'Estafette (2 January 1894).

The crackdown extended to anarchists in French colonial territories; in Algeria, Paul Régnier, Jules Xixonnet, and other companions were arrested after protesting the police raid on the anarchist colony of Tarzout. Anarchist newspapers were banned in Algiers and Mostaganem on 5 January 1894, with police seizing the stocks.

Various pretexts were used to justify arrests: one man was prosecuted for shouting "Long live anarchy! Long live Ravachol!" on charges of glorifying murder, while another received a two-year prison sentence for teaching anarchist theory to someone who later stole from his employer. Some were arrested for their friendships with anarchists in sports associations, while others were detained simply for expressing sympathy toward anarchism.

On 3 January 1894, it was anarchists located in Besançon, Toulouse, Marseille, and Grenoble who were targeted. Two days later, the measures resumed in Marseille and began in Carmaux. On 6 January 1894, the operations resumed in Brest and Saint-Étienne, and also reached Arras. The next day, operations targeted Beauvais and once again, Valence and Saint-Étienne. On the 8th, they reached Beauvais, Le Havre, Calais, Toulouse, Algiers, and Saint-Gaudens. On 13 and 15 January 1894, Bordeaux, Saint-Étienne, and Lyon were touched. On the 17th of January 1894, police raided and arrested anarchist restaurateur Constant Martin, who had been hosting Sidonie Vaillant for several days—taking advantage of her absence while she was out shopping with her adoptive mother. On 24 January 1894, the crackdown reached Béziers.

In total, 248 people were arrested in January, with 80 remaining in pre-trial detention for more than two months.

The anarchist press was censored, first banned from kiosks. Émile Pouget, the founder of Le Père Peinard, managed to escape to the United Kingdom, but on 21 February 1894, the police imposed a complete ban on the newspaper.

Meanwhile, Vaillant's trial took place. In his defense, he condemned imperialism and the widespread poverty in French society, arguing that he had killed no one and had only sought to injure as a means of making the deputies aware of social injustices. He was sentenced to death. His fate stirred emotions among the working-class population of Paris, who saw in him a man scarred by a life of misery and worried for his young daughter, Sidonie Vaillant. Since most of those injured in the attack recovered quickly and had only suffered minor wounds, the possibility of granting him clemency was raised. His daughter wrote a letter to Cécile Carnot pleading for her father's pardon, and later, a group of socialist deputies, joined by Georges Clemenceau, also appealed to president Sadi Carnot for clemency—without success.

Vaillant was executed by guillotine on 5 February 1894. He was the first person in 19th-century France to be executed without having killed anyone. David Raynal triumphantly addressed the Chamber of Deputies, declaring that the lois scélérates had "thrown terror into the anarchist camp".

The repression also targeted anarchist groups like the French anarchist leagues, comprising the Ligue des Anti-propriétaires and the Ligue des antipatriotes.

=== Resume of attacks ===
Despite Raynal's statement, the severe repression of the anarchist movement led to the radicalization of several militants who managed to evade the French police and avoid arrest—often, the most radical anarchists were the very ones who succeeded in escaping. Thus, Émile Henry, witnessing this situation unfold after his return to Paris on 18 December 1893, decided to avenge Vaillant by assassinating Sadi Carnot.

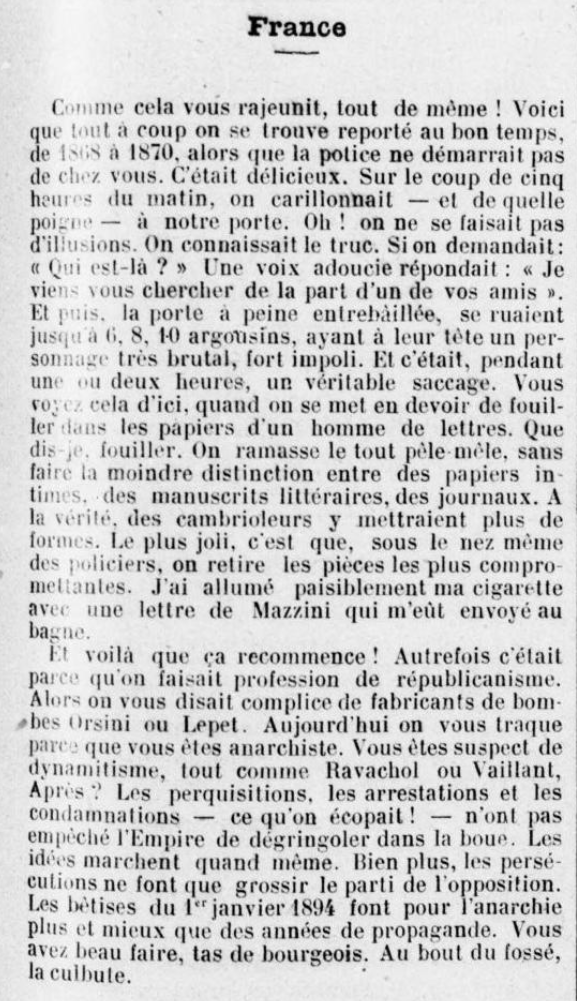
Reaction of Le Révolté (6 January 1894) to the 1 January raids

Six days after Vaillant's execution, Henry went near the Élysée Palace. Seeing a strong police presence that made any action impossible, he instead chose to target the Café Terminus, where he threw a bomb into the crowd, killing one person and injuring 21. This attack, considered a foundational act of modern terrorism because Henry no longer targeted individuals but society as a whole—perceived as an objective enemy—was partially explained by Henry as an act of revenge for the repression suffered by anarchists. During his trial, he declared:

The bourgeoisie has made anarchists into a single bloc. [...] Well then! Since you hold an entire movement responsible for the acts of a single man and strike as a bloc, we too will strike as a bloc.

Two days later, the vicious circle of "repression-attacks" was highlighted by republicans such as Georges Clemenceau, who questioned the effectiveness of such measures in combating terrorism on 14 February 1894. He wrote, bringing the issue of political repression's efficacy to public attention:

Will executions and attacks succeed one another endlessly?

A friend of Henry, Désiré Pauwels, responded to Henry's arrest by carrying out the 20 February and the Madeleine bombings. Two days before Henry's execution, Célestin Nat carried out the 1894 Marseille stabbing. Finally, on 24 June 1894, Sante Caserio assassinated Sadi Carnot in Lyon.

== Legacy ==
In the following months, other European powers were influenced by this wave of police repression. Inspired by France, Italy implemented similar measures in June 1894, deporting 3,000 anarchists to penal colonies, while hundreds fled into exile. Spain soon followed the same path.

=== Police critics ===
In his Memoirs, Marie-François Goron, former head of the French Sûreté during the repression, questions the effectiveness of such police practices. He stated on the matter:

One should not overestimate the results of intimidation on men. Certainly, many revolutionaries of this generation are quite capable of considering the troubles of a long incarceration before going out like their ancestors to shout on the boulevard and overturn newspaper kiosks. But the fear of prison has never stopped a true man of action. It's unlikely that the fear of a stay in Mazas prison would have impressed Ravachol or Émile Henry. [...] On the other hand, unjustly endured imprisonment irritates even the calmest individuals. [...] All the anarchist hunts I have witnessed have had the most pathetic results.

== Bibliography ==
- Badier, Walter (2010), "Émile Henry, le « Saint-Just de l'Anarchie »" [Émile Henry, the 'Saint-Just of Anarchy'], Parlement[s] (in French), vol. 14, no. 2, Paris: Revue d'histoire politique, pp. 159–171, doi:10.3917/parl.014.0159
- Bantman, Constance (2014), "« Anarchistes de la bombe, anarchistes de l'idée » : les anarchistes français à Londres, 1880-1895" ['Bomb anarchists, idea anarchists': French anarchists in London, 1880-1895], Le Mouvement Social (in French), 246 (1), Paris: 47–61, doi:10.3917/lms.246.0047
- Bouhey, Vivien (2009), Les Anarchistes contre la République [The Anarchists against the Republic] (in French), Rennes: Presses universitaires de Rennes (PUR)
- Chambost, Anne-Sophie (2017), "« Nous ferons de notre pire… ». Anarchie, illégalisme … et lois scélérates" [«We'll Do our Worse». Anarchy, Illegalism … and Evil Law], Droit et Cultures, 74 (2): 65–87, doi:10.4000/droitcultures.4264
- Ferragu, Gilles (2019), "L'écho des bombes : l'invention du terrorisme « à l'aveugle » (1893-1895)" [The echo of bombs: The invention of indiscriminate terrorism (1893–1895)], Ethnologie française, 49 (1): 21–31, doi:10.3917/ethn.191.0021
- Jourdain, Edouard (2013). L'anarchisme [Anarchism]. Paris: La Découverte. ISBN 978-2-7071-9091-8.
- Merriman, John M. (2016). The dynamite club: how a bombing in fin-de-siècle Paris ignited the age of modern terror. Yale University Press. ISBN 978-0-300-21792-6.
- Péchu, Cécile (2010), Les squats [Squats], Contester, Paris: Presses de Sciences Po (PSP), doi:10.3917/scpo.pechu.2010.01, ISBN 978-2-7246-1169-4
- Piarotas, Mireille (2000). Regards populaires sur la violence [Popular looks at violence]. Saint Etienne (France): Presses Universitaires de Saint-Etienne (PUSE). ISBN 978-2862721804.
- Salomé, Karine (2021), "Le 9 décembre 1893, attentat anarchiste à la Chambre des députés" [9 December 1893, an anarchist attentat on the House of Representatives], Parlement[S], Revue d'Histoire Politique, 16 (2), Paris: 145–152, doi:10.3917/parl2.hs16.0145
- Ward, Colin (2004). Anarchism: A Very Short Introduction. Oxford University Press (OUP).
