= Georges Brunet =

French anarchist (1868–1908)

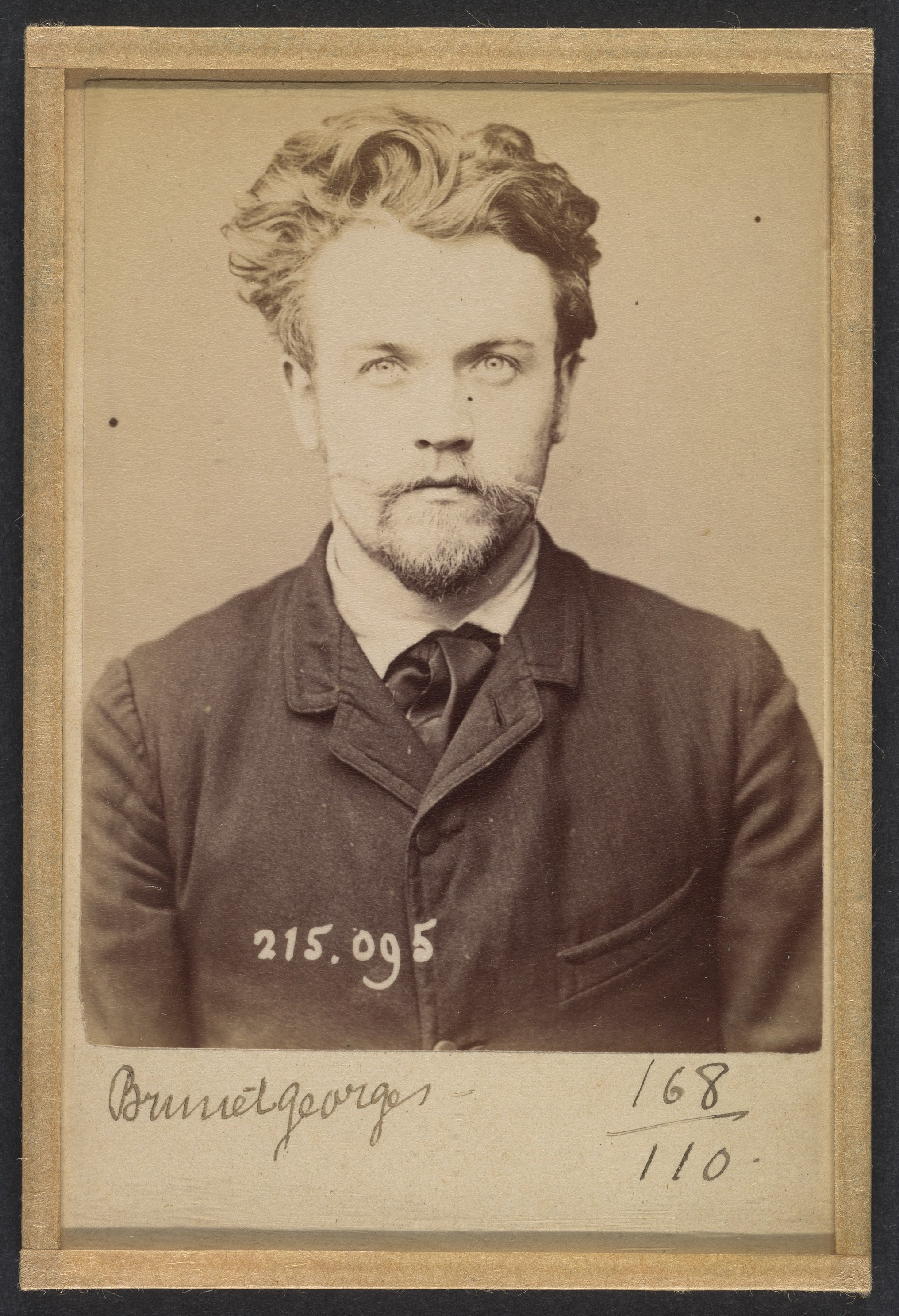
- Georges Brunet's mugshot by Alphonse Bertillon (1894)
- Born: 27 February 1868; Paris
- Died: 9 April 1908 (aged 40); Paris
- Occupation(s): carpenter, anarchist
- Known for: Being targeted during the Trial of the Thirty, among others
- Movement: Anarchism

Georges Brunet, nicknamed "La Violette", (1868–1908), was a French carpenter and anarchist. He is known, among other things, for being one of the accused in the Trial of the Thirty.

A figure in the anarchist movement in France of the 1890s, Brunet became a speaker at several anarchist meetings. There, he advocated for the use of syndicalism and opposed the practices of his illegalist companions.

Targeted by the Trial of the Thirty, he defended himself by stating that he had never supported illegalist theories and was acquitted. He subsequently became involved in the Dreyfus affair and continued his syndicalist activities.

== Biography ==
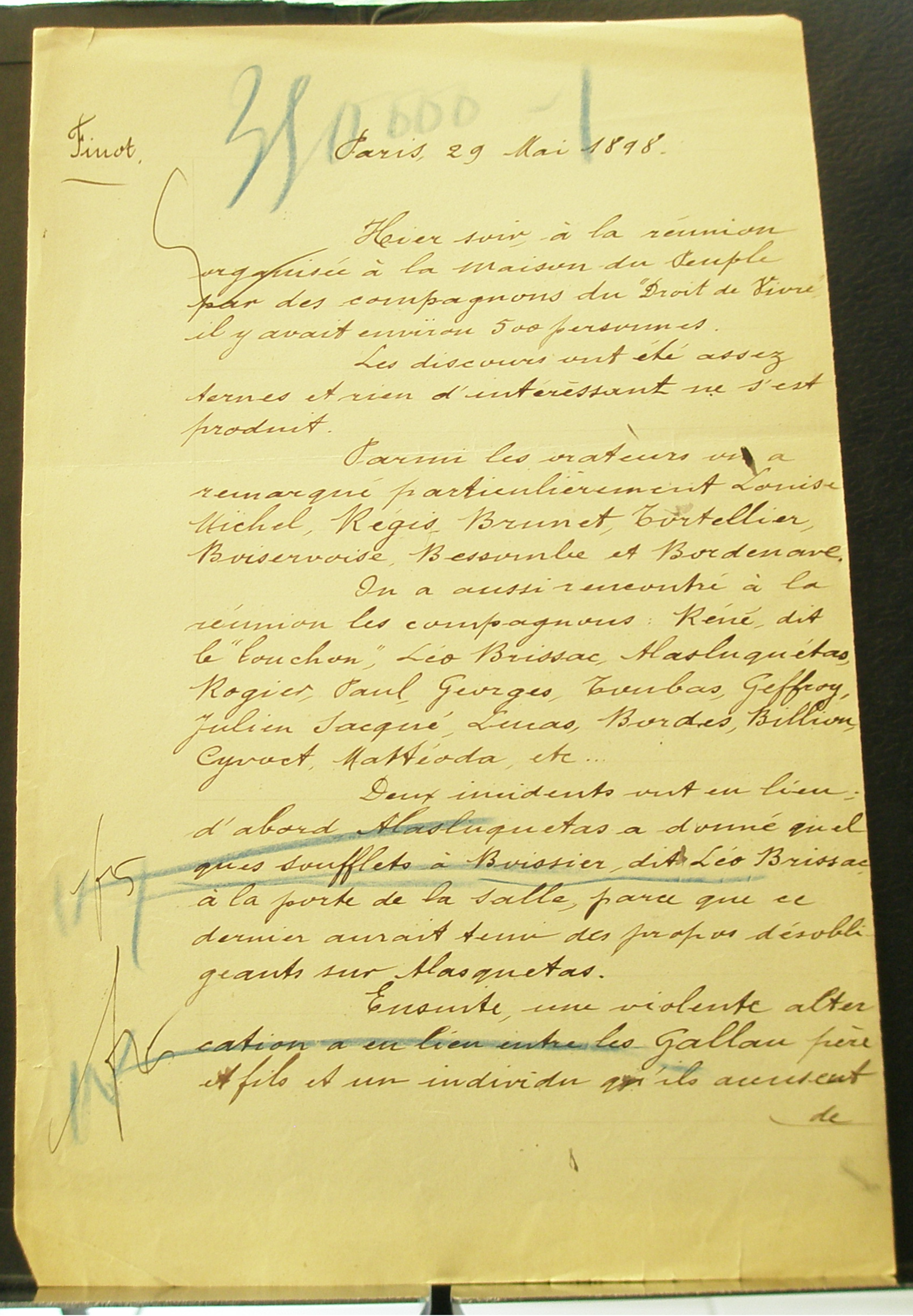
Report on an anarchist meeting including Louise Michel or Georges Brunet (courtesy of Archives anarchistes) (1898)

Georges Brunet was born on 27 February 1868 in the 9th arrondissement of Paris. According to his birth certificate, he was the son of Marie Brunet, a seamstress, and had no declared father.

In 1886, he joined the Ligue des antipatriotes and was one of the organization's speakers at one of its large meetings, held at the Salle Favié. He spoke alongside other anarchists, including Alexandre Tennevin, Jacques Prolo, and Édouard Devertus.

The following year, with Charles Malato, Brunet was one of the speakers at an anti-Boulangist meeting in the same hall. He joined the International Anarchist Circle that same year, then an important gathering place for anarchists in France. Brunet also worked as a carpenter during this period.

In 1889, Brunet followed Le Père Peinard's call to present abstentionist candidates in the legislative elections, which he did. In parallel, Brunet participated in the international anarchist congress and opposed Devertus on the subject of illegalist practices. In 1890, he was sentenced to a prison term for "not having stamped his electoral posters".

During discussions among anarchists about their participation—or not—in the demonstrations organised on 1 May for International Workers' Day, Brunet supported participation. In 1893, Brunet came into conflict with Jean-Pierre François, who accused him of being a "phrase-monger and joker".

He was arrested the following year shortly before this day, and also opposed Sébastien Faure with Prolo, arguing that this day, although established by politicians, had "become revolutionary and with anarchist tendencies".

He was arrested and indicted as part of the Trial of the Thirty, a political trial targeting thirty anarchists in 1894. Defended by Paul Gantier-Rougeville, he declared that he had never supported illegalist theories or theft and had preferred syndicalism. Brunet was acquitted, as were almost all of the defendants.

During the Dreyfus affair, Brunet was active. He continued his speaking activities and participated in other meetings, including an antimilitarist one in 1898. The same year, he was secretary of the central committee for the strike of Parisian building workers.

In the early 20th century, the anarchist was still noted for his militant activities. He died in the 18th arrondissement of Paris on 9 April 1908.

== Legacy ==
=== Nicknames ===
Within the anarchist movement, Brunet had several nicknames and pseudonyms, including: la Terreur-des-bouts-de-bois ('the Terror-of-wood-scraps'), La Violette ('The Violet') or Bouquet-des-dames ('Ladies' Bouquet').

=== Police photograph ===
His police photograph is part of the collections of the Metropolitan Museum of Art (MET).

== Bibliography ==
- Davranche, Guillaume (2024), "BRUNET Georges [dit la Terreur-des-bouts-de-bois, La Violette ou Bouquet-des-dames]", Dictionnaire des anarchistes (Le Maitron), Paris: Le Maitron des anarchistes
