= March 10 =

March 10 this year in various calendars
- Tuesday, 10 March 2026
Akan	Kwabene
Armenian	23 Areg 1475
Aztec	Tecuilhuitontli 19, 8 Mazātl
Babylonian	20 Shabatu, 2336 SE
Balinese pawukon	Menga, Beteng, Jaya, Umanis, Was, Anggara of Wayang, Kala, Jangur, Dewa
Bengali	25 Falgun, BS 1432
Chinese	Yin Water Goat・Tail Mansion; Fire Horse Year, Month 1, Day 22 (Jingzhe, 10 days until Chunfen)
Common Era	10 March 2026 CE
Coptic	1 Paremhat, AM 1742
Egyptian	28 Epiphi, 2774 NE
Ethiopian	1 Magābit, 2018 Amätä Məhrät
French Republican	Décade II, Décadi de Ventôse de l'Année 234 de la République
Gregorian	10 March, AD 2026
Hebrew	21 Adar, AM 5786
Hindu	Anurādhā・Harṣaṇa; Solar: 26 Phālguna, 1947 SE; Lunisolar: Saptamī, Kṛishna pakṣa of Phālguna, 2082 VE; Rāudra・5126 KY・1,872,644
Icelandic	Þriðjudagur, 17 Góa 2025
Islamic	21 Ramadan, AH 1447 (using tabular method)
ISO week date	2026-W11-2
Japanese	22 Mutsuki, Reiwa 8 (Keichitsu, 10 days until Shunbun)
Julian	25 February, AD 2026 (AM 7534)
Julian day	2461110
Korean	22 Horangidal, 4359 DE
Maya	13.0.13.7.7; 5 Cumku, 8 Manik
Roman	ante diem V Kalendas Martias, MMDCCLXXIX AUC
Solar Hijri	19 Esfand, SH 1404
Tibetan	22 mchu, me pho rta 2153 or 1772 or 1000

<<	March					>>
Su	Mo	Tu	We	Th	Fr	Sa
1	2	3	4	5	6	7
8	9	10	11	12	13	14
15	16	17	18	19	20	21
22	23	24	25	26	27	28
29	30	31
2026

March 10 in recent years
2026 (Tuesday)
2025 (Monday)
2024 (Sunday)
2023 (Friday)
2022 (Thursday)
2021 (Wednesday)
2020 (Tuesday)
2019 (Sunday)
2018 (Saturday)
2017 (Friday)

March 10 is the 69th day of the year (70th in leap years) in the Gregorian calendar; 296 days remain until the end of the year.

== Events ==
=== Pre-1600 ===
- 241 BC – First Punic War: Battle of the Aegates: The Romans sink the Carthaginian fleet bringing the First Punic War to an end.
- 298 – Roman Emperor Maximian concludes his campaign in North Africa and makes a triumphal entry into Carthage.
- 947 – The Later Han is founded by Liu Zhiyuan. He declares himself emperor.
- 1496 – After establishing the city of Santo Domingo, Christopher Columbus departs for Spain, leaving his brother in command.
- 1535 – Spaniard Fray Tomás de Berlanga, the fourth Bishop of Panama, discovers the Galápagos Islands by chance on his way to Peru.

=== 1601–1900 ===
- 1607 – Susenyos I defeats the combined armies of Yaqob and Abuna Petros II at the Battle of Gol in Gojjam, making him Emperor of Ethiopia.
- 1629 – Charles I dissolves the Parliament of England, beginning the eleven-year period known as the Personal Rule.
- 1661 – French "Sun King" Louis XIV begins his personal rule of France after the death of his premier, the Cardinal Mazarin.
- 1735 – An agreement between Nader Shah and Russia is signed near Ganja, Azerbaijan and Russian troops are withdrawn from occupied territories.
- 1762 – French Huguenot Jean Calas, who had been wrongly convicted of killing his son, dies after being tortured by authorities; the event inspired Voltaire to begin a campaign for religious tolerance and legal reform.
- 1814 – Emperor Napoleon I is defeated at the Battle of Laon in France.
- 1830 – The Royal Netherlands East Indies Army is created.
- 1831 – The French Foreign Legion is created by Louis Philippe, the King of France, from the foreign regiments of the Kingdom of France.
- 1848 – The Treaty of Guadalupe Hidalgo is ratified by the United States Senate, ending the Mexican–American War.
- 1861 – El Hadj Umar Tall seizes the city of Ségou, destroying the Bamana Empire of Mali.
- 1873 – The first Azerbaijani play, The Adventures of the Vizier of the Khan of Lenkaran, prepared by Akhundov, is performed by Hassan-bey Zardabi and dramatist and Najaf-bey Vezirov.
- 1876 – The first successful test of a telephone is made by Alexander Graham Bell.
- 1891 – Almon Strowger patents the Strowger switch, a device which led to the automation of telephone circuit switching.

=== 1901–present ===
- 1906 – The Courrières mine disaster, Europe's worst ever, kills 1099 miners in northern France.
- 1909 – By signing the Anglo-Siamese Treaty of 1909, Thailand relinquishes its sovereignty over the Malay states of Kedah, Kelantan, Perlis and Terengganu, which become British protectorates.
- 1922 – Mahatma Gandhi is arrested in India, tried for sedition, and sentenced to six years in prison, only to be released after nearly two years for an appendicitis operation.
- 1933 – The Long Beach earthquake affects the Greater Los Angeles Area, leaving around 108 people dead.
- 1944 – Greek Civil War: The Political Committee of National Liberation is established in Greece by the National Liberation Front.
- 1945 – World War II: The U.S. Army Air Force firebombs Tokyo, and the resulting conflagration kills more than 100,000 people, mostly civilians.
- 1949 – Mildred Gillars ("Axis Sally") is convicted of treason.
- 1952 – Fulgencio Batista leads a successful coup in Cuba.
- 1959 – Tibetan uprising: Fearing an abduction attempt by China, thousands of Tibetans surround the Dalai Lama's palace to prevent his removal.
- 1966 – Military Prime Minister of South Vietnam Nguyễn Cao Kỳ sacks rival General Nguyễn Chánh Thi, precipitating large-scale civil and military dissension in parts of the nation.
- 1969 – In Memphis, Tennessee, James Earl Ray pleads guilty to assassinating Martin Luther King Jr. He later unsuccessfully attempts to recant.
- 1970 – Vietnam War: Captain Ernest Medina is charged by the U.S. military with My Lai war crimes.
- 1971 – John Gorton resigns as Prime Minister of Australia and the leader of the Liberal Party of Australia after a secret ballot vote of confidence, being replaced in both positions by William McMahon.
- 1974 – 1974 Belgian general election: Elections are held in Belgium for all 212 seats in the Chamber of Representatives, the Belgian Socialist Party taking the majority with 59.
- 1975 – Vietnam War: Ho Chi Minh Campaign: North Vietnamese troops attack Ban Mê Thuột in the South on their way to capturing Saigon in the final push for victory over South Vietnam.
- 1977 – Astronomers discover the rings of Uranus.
- 1979 – 1979 International Women's Day protests in Tehran: Protestor involvement peaks with 15,000 Iranian women and girls performing a three‐hour-long sit‐in at the Courthouse of Tehran.
- 1982 – Syzygy: All nine planets recognized at this time — Mercury to Pluto — align on the same side of the Sun.
- 1989 – Air Ontario Flight 1363, a Fokker F-28 Fellowship, crashes at Dryden Regional Airport in Dryden, Ontario, Canada, killing 24.
- 1990 – In Haiti, Prosper Avril is ousted eighteen months after seizing power in a coup d'état in September 1988.
- 1991 – 1991 Salvadoran legislative election: The Nationalist Republican Alliance wins 39 of the 84 seats in the Legislative Assembly of El Salvador.
- 2000 – The Dot-com bubble peaks with the NASDAQ Composite stock market index reaching 5,048.62.
- 2006 – The Mars Reconnaissance Orbiter arrives at Mars.
- 2017 – The impeachment of President Park Geun-hye of South Korea in response to a major political scandal is unanimously upheld by the country's Constitutional Court, ending her presidency.
- 2019 – Ethiopian Airlines Flight 302, a Boeing 737 MAX, crashes shortly after takeoff, killing all 157 passengers and crew. This and the prior Lion Air Flight 610 led to all 387 Boeing 737 MAX aircraft being grounded worldwide.
- 2022 – 2022 Hungarian presidential election: The National Assembly of Hungary elects former minister for Family Affairs, Katalin Novák, as president of Hungary in a 137–51 vote, becoming the first female president in the country's history.
- 2023 – Silicon Valley Bank collapses due to a run on its deposits, in the second largest bank failure in US history. Its operations are taken over by the FDIC.
- 2024 – 2024 Portuguese legislative election: Elections are held in Portugal for all 230 seats in the Assembly of the Republic. The Partido Socialista loses its absolute majority to the Partido Social Democrata, winning 77 and 79 seats respectively.
- 2026 – Bam Adebayo of the Miami Heat recorded the second-highest scoring game in NBA history with 83 Points.

== Births ==
=== Pre-1600 ===
- 1452 – Ferdinand II, King of Castile and León (died 1516)
- 1503 – Ferdinand I, Holy Roman Emperor (died 1564)
- 1536 – Thomas Howard, 4th Duke of Norfolk, English politician, Earl Marshal of the United Kingdom (died 1572)
- 1596 – Princess Maria Elizabeth of Sweden, daughter of King Charles IX of Sweden (died 1618)

=== 1601–1900 ===
- 1604 – Johann Rudolf Glauber, German-Dutch alchemist and chemist (died 1670)
- 1628 – François Girardon, French sculptor (died 1715)
- 1628 – Marcello Malpighi, Italian physician and biologist (died 1694)
- 1653 – John Benbow, Royal Navy admiral (died 1702)
- 1656 – Giacomo Serpotta, Italian Rococo sculptor (died 1732)
- 1709 – Georg Wilhelm Steller, German botanist, zoologist, physician, and explorer (died 1746)
- 1748 – John Playfair, Scottish minister and scientist (died 1819)
- 1749 – Lorenzo Da Ponte, Italian-American priest and poet (died 1838)
- 1769 – Joseph Williamson, English businessman and philanthropist (died 1840)
- 1772 – Karl Wilhelm Friedrich Schlegel, German poet and critic (died 1829)
- 1777 – Louis Hersent, French painter (died 1860)
- 1787 – Francisco de Paula Martínez de la Rosa y Berdejo, Spanish playwright and politician, Prime Minister of Spain (died 1862)
- 1787 – William Etty, English painter and academic (died 1849)
- 1788 – Joseph Freiherr von Eichendorff, German author, poet, playwright, and critic (died 1857)
- 1788 – Edward Hodges Baily, English sculptor (died 1867)
- 1789 – Manuel de la Peña y Peña, Mexican lawyer and 20th President (1847) (died 1850)
- 1795 – Joseph Légaré, Canadian painter and glazier, artist, seigneur and political figure (died 1855)
- 1810 – Samuel Ferguson, Irish poet and lawyer (died 1886)
- 1841 – Ina Coolbrith, first poet laureate of California, writer, and librarian (died 1928)
- 1843 – Evelyn Abbott, English classical scholar (died 1901)
- 1844 – Pablo de Sarasate, Spanish violinist and composer (died 1908)
- 1844 – Marie Euphrosyne Spartali, British Pre-Raphaelite painter (died 1927)
- 1845 – Alexander III of Russia (died 1894)
- 1846 – Edward Baker Lincoln, American son of Abraham Lincoln (died 1850)
- 1850 – Spencer Gore, English tennis player and cricketer (died 1906)
- 1853 – Thomas Mackenzie, Scottish-New Zealand cartographer and politician, 18th Prime Minister of New Zealand (died 1930)
- 1861 – E. Pauline Johnson, Canadian First Nations poet and performer (died 1913)
- 1867 – Hector Guimard, French-American architect (died 1942)
- 1867 – Lillian Wald, American nurse, humanitarian, and author, founded the Henry Street Settlement (died 1940)
- 1870 – David Riazanov, Russian theorist and politician (died 1938)
- 1873 – Jakob Wassermann, German-Austrian soldier and author (died 1934)
- 1876 – Anna Hyatt Huntington, American sculptor (died 1973)
- 1877 – Pascual Ortiz Rubio, Mexican diplomat and president (1930–1932) (died 1963)
- 1881 – Jessie Boswell, English painter (died 1956)
- 1888 – Barry Fitzgerald, Irish actor (died 1961)
- 1890 – Albert Ogilvie, Australian politician, 28th Premier of Tasmania (died 1939)
- 1891 – Sam Jaffe, American actor, teacher, musician and engineer (died 1984)
- 1892 – Arthur Honegger, French composer and educator (died 1955)
- 1892 – Gregory La Cava, American director, producer, and screenwriter (died 1952)
- 1896 – Frederick Coulton Waugh, British cartoonist, painter, teacher and author (died 1973)
- 1900 – Violet Brown, Jamaican supercentenarian, oldest Jamaican ever (died 2017)
- 1900 – Pandelis Pouliopoulos, Greek lawyer and politician (died 1943)

=== 1901–present ===
- 1901 – Michel Seuphor, Belgian painter (died 1999)
- 1903 – Edward Bawden, English artist and illustrator (died 1989)
- 1903 – Bix Beiderbecke, American cornet player, pianist, and composer (died 1931)
- 1903 – Clare Boothe Luce, American playwright, journalist, and diplomat, United States Ambassador to Italy (died 1987)
- 1915 – Harry Bertoia, Italian-American sculptor and furniture designer (died 1978)
- 1915 – Joža Horvat, Croatian writer (died 2012)
- 1917 – David Hare, American Surrealist artist, sculptor, photographer and painter (died 1992)
- 1918 – Günther Rall, German general and pilot (died 2009)
- 1919 – Leonor Oyarzún, Chilean socialite, First Lady of Chile from 1990 to 1994 (died 2022)
- 1920 – Alfred Peet, Dutch-American businessman, founded Peet's Coffee & Tea (died 2007)
- 1920 – Kenneth C. "Jethro" Burns, American mandolinist and comic singer (died 1989)
- 1923 – Val Logsdon Fitch, American physicist and academic, Nobel Prize laureate (died 2015)
- 1924 – Judith Jones, American literary and cookbook editor (died 2017)
- 1925 – Bob Lanier, American lawyer, banker, and politician, Mayor of Houston (died 2014)
- 1926 – Marques Haynes, American basketball player (died 2015)
- 1927 – Claude Laydu, Belgian-French actor, producer, and screenwriter (died 2011)
- 1928 – Sara Montiel, Spanish actress (died 2013)
- 1928 – James Earl Ray, American criminal; assassin of Martin Luther King Jr. (died 1998)
- 1929 – Sam Steiger, American journalist and politician (died 2012)
- 1930 – Sándor Iharos, Hungarian runner (died 1996)
- 1931 – Georges Dor, Canadian author, playwright, and composer (died 2001)
- 1932 – Marcia Falkender, Baroness Falkender, English politician (died 2019)
- 1933 – Ralph Emery, American country music disc jockey, radio and television host (died 2022)
- 1934 – Gergely Kulcsár, Hungarian javelin thrower (died 2020)
- 1935 – Polly Farmer, Australian footballer and coach (died 2019)
- 1936 – Sepp Blatter, Swiss businessman and eighth president of FIFA
- 1937 – María Kodama, Argentine writer and translator (died 2023)
- 1937 – Sam Hall, American diver, legislator, and mercenary (died 2014)
- 1938 – Norman Blake, American singer-songwriter and guitarist
- 1938 – Ron Mix, American football player
- 1939 – Asghar Ali Engineer, Indian activist and author (died 2013)
- 1939 – Irina Press, Ukrainian-Russian hurdler and pentathlete (died 2004)
- 1940 – LeRoy Ellis, American basketball player (died 2012)
- 1940 – Chuck Norris, American actor, producer, and martial artist (died 2026)
- 1940 – David Rabe, American playwright and screenwriter
- 1941 – George P. Smith, American biologist, Nobel laureate in Chemistry
- 1943 – Peter Berresford Ellis, English historian and author
- 1945 – Katharine Houghton, American actress and playwright
- 1945 – Madhavrao Scindia, Indian politician, Indian Minister of Railways (died 2001)
- 1946 – Curley Culp, American football player (died 2021)
- 1946 – Gérard Garouste, French contemporary artist
- 1946 – Jim Valvano, American basketball player and coach (died 1993)
- 1947 – Kim Campbell, Canadian lawyer and politician, 19th Prime Minister of Canada
- 1947 – Tom Scholz, American musician and songwriter
- 1948 – Austin Carr, American basketball player
- 1951 – Gloria Diaz, Filipino actress and beauty queen, Miss Universe 1969
- 1952 – Morgan Tsvangirai, Zimbabwean politician, Prime Minister of Zimbabwe (died 2018)
- 1953 – Paul Haggis, Canadian director, producer, and screenwriter
- 1953 – Ronnie Earl, American blues guitarist
- 1955 – Toshio Suzuki, Japanese race car driver
- 1956 – Robert Llewellyn, English actor, producer, and screenwriter
- 1956 – Larry Myricks, American long jumper and sprinter
- 1956 – Odile Buisson, French gynecologist, advocate for women's right to pleasure
- 1957 – Osama bin Laden, Saudi Arabian terrorist, founded al-Qaeda (died 2011)
- 1958 – Garth Crooks, English footballer and sportscaster
- 1958 – Steve Howe, American baseball player (died 2006)
- 1958 – Sheikh Mohammad Illias, Bengali politician
- 1958 – Sharon Stone, American actress and producer
- 1961 – Laurel Clark, American captain, physician, and astronaut (died 2003)
- 1962 – Jasmine Guy, American actress, singer, and director
- 1962 – Seiko Matsuda, Japanese singer-songwriter
- 1963 – Jeff Ament, American bass player and songwriter
- 1963 – Rick Rubin, American record producer
- 1964 – Greg Campbell, Australian cricketer
- 1964 – Neneh Cherry, Swedish singer-songwriter
- 1964 – Prince Edward, Duke of Edinburgh
- 1965 – Jillian Richardson, Canadian sprinter
- 1965 – Rod Woodson, American football player, coach, and sportscaster
- 1966 – Mike Timlin, American baseball player
- 1968 – Alma Čardžić, Bosnian singer
- 1968 – Pavel Srníček, Czech footballer and coach (died 2015)
- 1971 – Jon Hamm, American actor and director
- 1972 – Beth Buchanan, Australian actress
- 1972 – Matt Kenseth, American NASCAR driver
- 1972 – Timbaland, American rapper and producer
- 1973 – Jason Croker, Australian rugby league player
- 1973 – Liu Qiangdong, Chinese entrepreneur, billionaire, founder of JD.com
- 1973 – Chris Sutton, English footballer
- 1973 – Mauricio Taricco, Argentine footballer and manager
- 1976 – Barbara Schett, Austrian tennis player
- 1977 – Robin Thicke, American singer, songwriter, and record producer
- 1978 – Benjamin Burnley, American musician
- 1978 – Camille, French singer-songwriter and actress
- 1981 – Samuel Eto'o, Cameroonian footballer
- 1981 – Steven Reid, English-Irish footballer
- 1982 – Kwame Brown, American basketball player
- 1982 – Dr Disrespect, American live streamer
- 1982 – Logan Mankins, American football player
- 1983 – Étienne Boulay, Canadian football player
- 1983 – Janet Mock, American journalist, author, and activist
- 1983 – Rafe Spall, English actor
- 1983 – Carrie Underwood, American singer-songwriter
- 1984 – Tim Brent, Canadian ice hockey player
- 1984 – Ben May, English footballer
- 1984 – Olivia Wilde, American actress and director
- 1986 – Sergei Shirokov, Russian ice hockey player
- 1987 – Martellus Bennett, American football player
- 1987 – Greg Eastwood, New Zealand rugby league player
- 1987 – Tuukka Rask, Finnish ice hockey player
- 1987 – Māris Štrombergs, Latvian BMX racer
- 1988 – Clarissa dos Santos, Brazilian basketball player
- 1988 – Josh Hoffman, Australian-New Zealand rugby league player
- 1988 – Ego Nwodim, American actress
- 1988 – Quincy Pondexter, American basketball player and coach
- 1988 – Ivan Rakitić, Croatian football player
- 1989 – Simon Moser, Swiss ice hockey player
- 1989 – Dayán Viciedo, Cuban baseball player
- 1990 – Stefanie Vögele, Swiss tennis player
- 1991 – Kenshi Yonezu, Japanese singer-songwriter and illustrator
- 1992 – Neeskens Kebano, French-Congolese footballer
- 1992 – Emily Osment, American actress and singer-songwriter
- 1993 – Jack Butland, English footballer
- 1993 – Aminata Namasia, Congolese politician
- 1994 – Bad Bunny, Puerto Rican rapper, songwriter, producer, actor, and wrestler
- 1994 – Nikita Parris, English footballer
- 1995 – Zach LaVine, American basketball player
- 1995 – Sergey Mozgov, Russian ice dancer
- 1997 – Belinda Bencic, Swiss tennis player
- 1998 – Justin Herbert, American football player
- 1999 – Cole Kmet, American football player
- 2000 – Nick Bolton, American football player
- 2002 – Keon Johnson, American basketball player
- 2004 – Matt Poitras, Canadian ice hockey player

== Deaths ==
=== Pre-1600 ===
- 483 – Pope Simplicius
- 948 – Liu Zhiyuan, Shatuo founder of the Later Han dynasty (born 895)
- 1291 – Arghun, Mongol ruler in Persia (born c. 1258)
- 1315 – Agnes Blannbekin, Austrian mystic
- 1513 – John de Vere, 13th Earl of Oxford, English commander and politician, Lord High Constable of England (born 1442)
- 1528 – Balthasar Hübmaier, German/Moravian Anabaptist leader
- 1572 – William Paulet, 1st Marquess of Winchester
- 1585 – Rembert Dodoens, Flemish physician and botanist (born 1517)

=== 1601–1900 ===
- 1682 – Jacob van Ruisdael, Dutch painter and etcher (born 1628)
- 1724 – Urban Hjärne, Swedish chemist, geologist, and physician (born 1641)
- 1776 – Élie Catherine Fréron, French author and critic (born 1718)
- 1792 – John Stuart, 3rd Earl of Bute, Scottish politician, Prime Minister of the United Kingdom (born 1713)
- 1826 – John Pinkerton, Scottish antiquarian, cartographer, author, numismatist and historian (born 1758)
- 1832 – Muzio Clementi, Italian pianist, composer, and conductor (born 1752)
- 1861 – Taras Shevchenko, Ukrainian poet, playwright, and ethnographer (born 1814)
- 1872 – Giuseppe Mazzini, Italian journalist and politician (born 1805)
- 1894 – Jacob Mahler, German-French saddler and anarchist (born 1832)
- 1895 – Charles Frederick Worth, English-French fashion designer (born 1825)
- 1897 – Savitribai Phule, Indian poet and activist (born 1831)
- 1898 – Marie-Eugénie de Jésus, French nun and saint, founded the Religious of the Assumption (born 1817)

=== 1901–present ===
- 1910 – Karl Lueger, Austrian lawyer and politician Mayor of Vienna (born 1844)
- 1910 – Carl Reinecke, German pianist, composer, and conductor (born 1824)
- 1913 – Harriet Tubman, American nurse and activist (born c. 1820)
- 1923 – Salvador Seguí, Catalan anarcho-syndicalist leader (born 1887)
- 1925 – Myer Prinstein, Polish-American jumper (born 1878)
- 1937 – Yevgeny Zamyatin, Russian journalist and author (born 1884)
- 1940 – Mikhail Bulgakov, Russian novelist and playwright (born 1891)
- 1942 – Wilbur Scoville, American pharmacist and chemist (born 1865)
- 1948 – Zelda Fitzgerald, American author, visual artist, and ballet dancer (born 1900)
- 1948 – Jan Masaryk, Czech soldier and politician (born 1886)
- 1951 – Kijūrō Shidehara, Japanese lawyer and politician, Prime Minister of Japan (born 1872)
- 1966 – Frits Zernike, Dutch physicist and academic, Nobel Prize laureate (born 1888)
- 1966 – Frank O'Connor, Irish short story writer, novelist, and poet (born 1903)
- 1969 – Muriel Hannah, American artist active in Alaska.
- 1973 – Evelyn Baring, 1st Baron Howick of Glendale (1960 – 1973), Governor of Kenya (1952 – 1959), High Commissioner for Southern Africa (1944 – 1951), Governor of Southern Rhodesia (1942 – 1944) (born 1903)
- 1973 – Li Mi, Chinese lieutenant general and anti-communist, Taiwanese nationalist (born 1902)
- 1973 – Richard Sharples, British politician, assassinated Governor of Bermuda (born 1916)
- 1977 – E. Power Biggs, English-American organist and composer (born 1906)
- 1985 – Konstantin Chernenko, Russian soldier and politician, Head of State of The Soviet Union (born 1911)
- 1985 – Bob Nieman, American baseball player (born 1927)
- 1986 – Ray Milland, Welsh-American actor and director (born 1907)
- 1988 – Andy Gibb, Australian singer-songwriter and actor (born 1958)
- 1992 – Giorgos Zampetas, Greek bouzouki player and composer (born 1925)
- 1996 – Ross Hunter, American film producer (born 1926)
- 1997 – LaVern Baker, American singer and actress (born 1929)
- 1998 – Lloyd Bridges, American actor and director (born 1913)
- 1999 – Oswaldo Guayasamín, Ecuadorian painter and sculptor (born 1919)
- 2005 – Dave Allen, Irish-English comedian, actor, and screenwriter (born 1936)
- 2007 – Ernie Ladd, American football player and wrestler (born 1938)
- 2010 – Muhammad Sayyid Tantawy, Egyptian scholar and academic (born 1928)
- 2010 – Corey Haim, Canadian actor (born 1971)
- 2011 – Bill Blackbeard, American author and illustrator (born 1926)
- 2012 – Jean Giraud, French author and illustrator (born 1938)
- 2012 – Frank Sherwood Rowland, American chemist and academic, Nobel Prize laureate (born 1927)
- 2013 – Princess Lilian, Duchess of Halland, British born Swedish Princess (born 1915)
- 2015 – Richard Glatzer, American director, producer, and screenwriter (born 1952)
- 2016 – Ken Adam, German-English production designer and art director (born 1921)
- 2016 – Roberto Perfumo, Argentinian footballer and sportscaster (born 1942)
- 2016 – Jovito Salonga, Filipino lawyer and politician, 14th President of the Senate of the Philippines (born 1920)
- 2016 – Anita Brookner, English novelist and art historian (born 1928)
- 2022 – John Elliott, English historian and academic (born 1930)
- 2023 – Napoleon XIV, American singer (born 1938)
- 2025 – Stanley R. Jaffe, American film producer and director (born 1940)
- 2025 – Carl Lundström, Swedish businessman and activist (born 1960)

== Holidays and observances ==
- Christian feast day
  - Attala
  - Harriet Tubman (Lutheran)
  - John Ogilvie
  - Macarius of Jerusalem
  - Marie-Eugénie de Jésus
  - Pope Simplicius
  - Sojourner Truth (Lutheran)
  - March 10 (Eastern Orthodox liturgics)
- Harriet Tubman Day (United States of America)
- Mario Day (International)
- Holocaust Remembrance Day (Bulgaria)
- National Women and Girls HIV/AIDS Awareness Day (United States)
- Székely Freedom Day (Romania)
- Tibetan Uprising Day (Tibetan independence movement)
