= Max Gordon =

Max Gordon may refer to:

- Max Gordon (anarchist) (1854–?), Lithuanian nihilist and anarchist
- Max Gordon (producer) (1892–1978), New York theater and film producer
- Max Gordon (Village Vanguard founder) (1908–1989), founder of the Village Vanguard jazz club
- Max Gordon (trade unionist) (1910–1977), South African trade union leader and Trotskyist activist
- Max Gordon (racing driver) (born 2008), American racing driver
