= Antoine Perrare =

French Communard and anarchist (1841–1912)

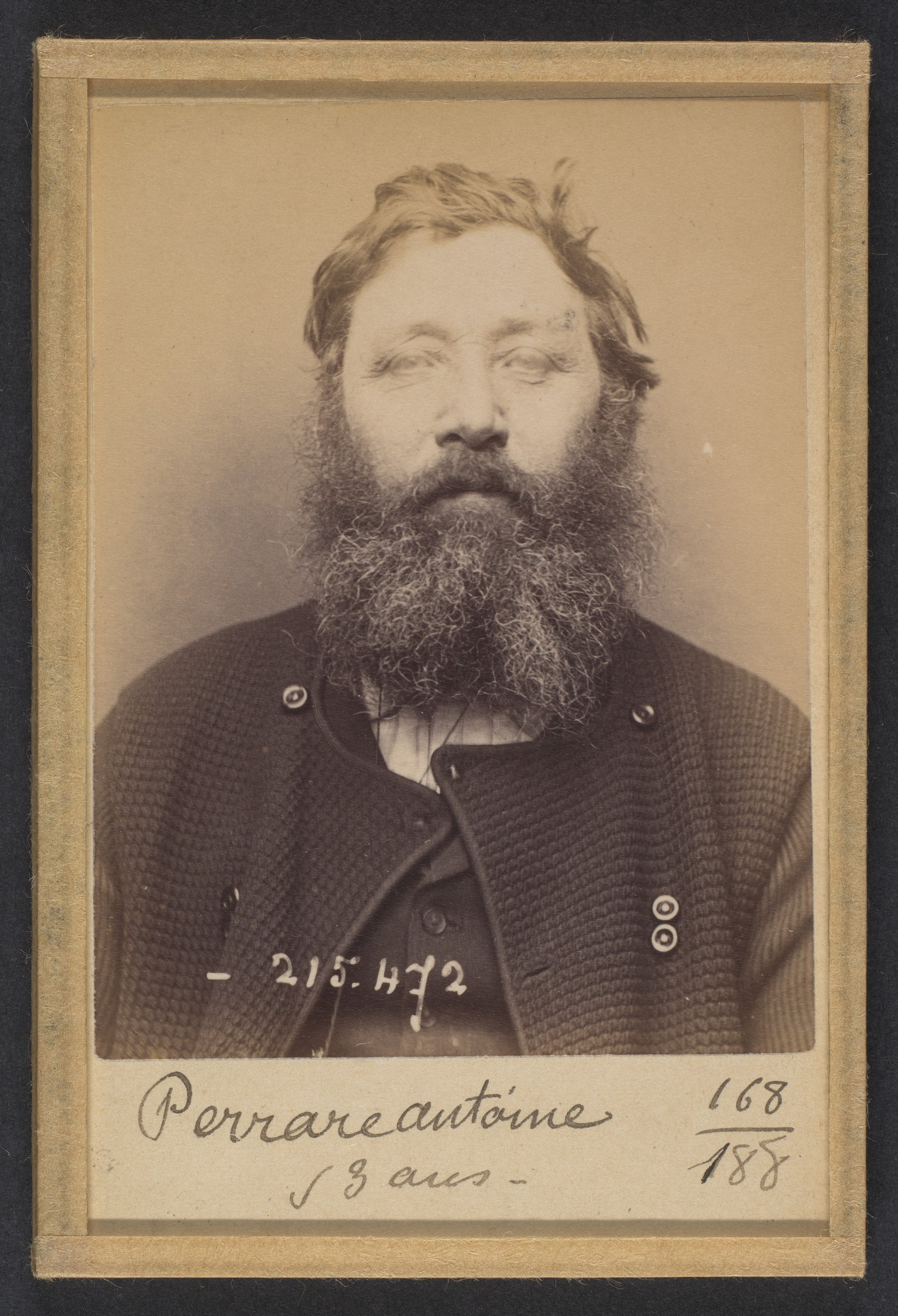
- Antoine Perrare's mugshot taken by Alphonse Bertillon (Anthropometric File of Anarchists - 1894)
- Born: 24 January 1841; Saint-Didier-sur-Beaujeu, Kingdom of the French
- Died: 5 March 1912 (aged 71); Nice, French Third Republic
- Citizenship: France
- Occupations: Mechanic; Anarchist activist
- Movement: Anarchism

Antoine Perrare (24 January 1841 – 5 March 1912) (also known as Chicago) was a French mechanic, Communard, and anarchist. He is known for his actions during the Commune of Lyon, his subsequent integration into the anarchist movement in Switzerland and France, and for being one of the first to embrace anarcho-communism.

Born in the Rhône department, Perrare moved to Lyon, where he was a well-regarded worker and ran a wine shop that became a gathering place for the city's revolutionaries. In 1871, he participated in the Commune of Lyon and was elected by the Lyonnaise population to represent them as a delegate to the Provisional Commission, where he held a seat. Following the defeat of the Communes in France, he managed to flee and settle in Geneva while the French justice system sentenced him to deportation. He first integrated into the Marxist circles of Geneva and then, in 1872, joined the anarchist movement during the ongoing schism between the two groups. He then became a notable figure in the Anti-authoritarian International, the anarchist organization that succeeded the First International. The anarchist was involved as a speaker in many meetings, ran a mechanic's workshop where he only hired French political refugees, and was in charge of the organization's propaganda section—he also associated with Peter Kropotkin and Jean Grave.

Expelled from Geneva, he returned to France after eighteen years in exile, settling in Lyon, Paris, Meurthe-et-Moselle, and then Nice. During these travels, Perrare never stopped advocating for anarchism and continued his activism—he was also a proponent of using propaganda by the deed. He died in Nice on 5 March 1912.

After his death, the anarchist press honored him by paying tribute to the constancy of his anarchism, which he professed until his last breath. His police mugshot is part of the collections of the Metropolitan Museum of Art (MET).

== Biography ==
=== Birth and early life ===
Antoine Perrare was born on 24 January 1841, in Saint-Didier-sur-Beaujeu, in the Rhône department.

=== Commune of Lyon and the First International ===
Perrare was known as a skilled worker and lived in Lyon from at least the 1860s to the 1870s, on Rue Bougeaud. He also ran a wine shop in Lyon which, according to the police, was frequented exclusively by revolutionaries. In 1871, he became a notable figure in the Commune of Lyon and a member of its provisional commission, being a delegate in charge of doing the link between the population and the commission. After the Commune's destruction by the French state, he managed to escape to Geneva to avoid repression and joined the First International (IWA) in its central Geneva section, which was then Marxist. Perrare was subsequently sentenced in absentia by a military court to deportation to a fortified prison in September 1871.

=== The Anti-authoritarian International ===
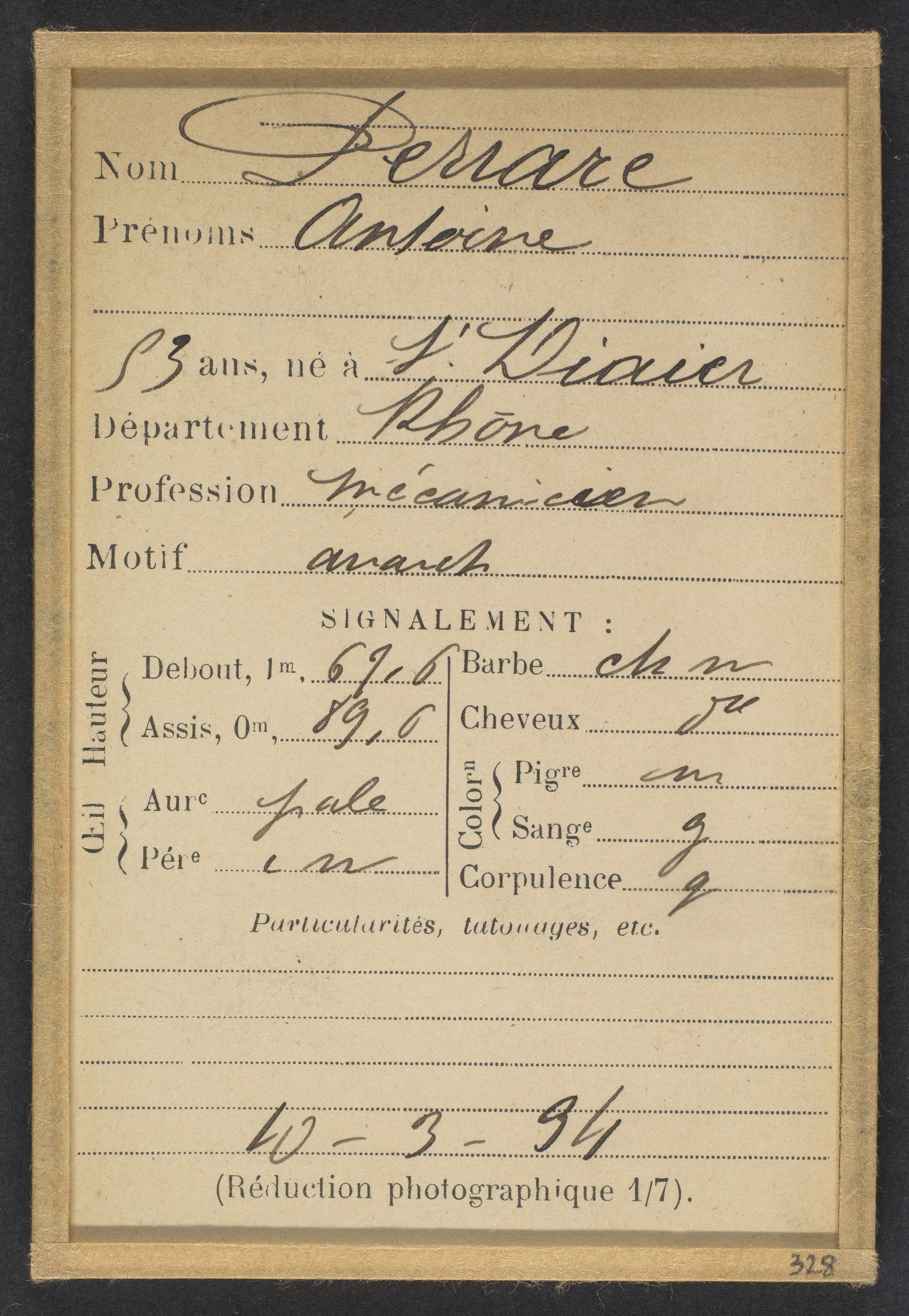
Alphonse Bertillon's file on Perrare (1894)

Following the schism of the First International (1872) between anarchists on one side and Marxists on the other, Perrare joined the Anti-authoritarian International, the anarchist organization that succeeded the First International.

He joined alongside Paul Brousse and Charles Alerini, and all three spoke at its sixth congress in September 1873. Among other things, he argued that the organization should be reserved for manual workers, proposing an amendment to the second article of the statutes. While the proposed statutes stated that any person could be admitted under the responsibility of the local section, he requested that the organization be reserved for manual workers.

This position was criticized by the anarchist James Guillaume as an 'attack against intelligence' but in reality reflected a fear of bourgeois infiltration into anarchist bodies at a time of rupture with the Marxists, who were accused of this. He stated:

If you leave the bourgeoisie and workers in contact within the International, it will only be to the detriment of the latter, because the bourgeoisie, being more educated, will acquire a certain influence in the sections that will always be bad for the manual worker.

In the years that followed, Perrare continued his anarchist activism within the Anti-authoritarian International. In 1876, he was a member of the L'Avenir ('The Future') group in Geneva, which Max Nettlau considers to be the first to defend anarcho-communism. In 1881, he spoke with Peter Kropotkin—a major theorist of this tendency of anarchism—to commemorate the assassination of Alexander II.

Perrare initially refused the amnesty offered to former Communards and remained in Geneva, where he was connected to Jean Grave and the presses of La Révolte, the newspaper run by Kropotkin and Grave. He belonged to the propaganda section of the Anti-authoritarian International and ran a mechanics workshop where he only hired political refugees fleeing France.

=== Expulsion from Geneva and Return to France ===
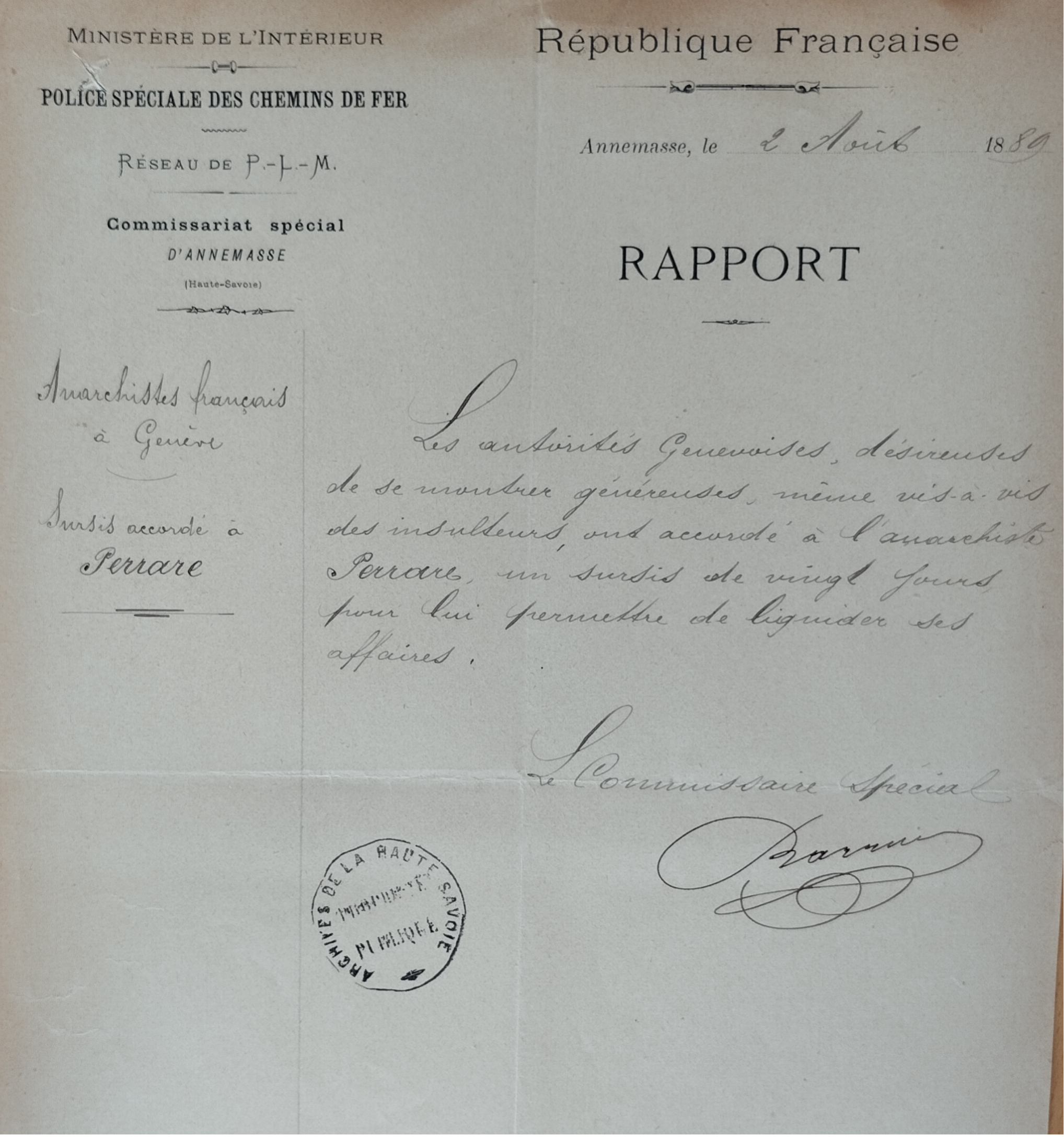
French authorities doing a report on Antoine Perrare's expulsion from Geneva (courtesy of Archives anarchistes)

In 1889, however, Antoine Perrare was expelled from Geneva for participating in a meeting of deserters. He then returned to France, settling first in Lyon and later in Paris. In Paris, Perrare opened a mechanical construction workshop, but it burned down in 1890. He then moved to Meurthe-et-Moselle, where a member of the Reclus family helped him find a job. In 1892, he likely participated in meetings of the International Anarchist Circle in Paris.

The anarchist continued his activism, speaking at numerous meetings. The French authorities noted him as a fervent supporter of propaganda by the deed. Perrare later moved to Nice, where he set up a bicycle shop. He died there on 5 March 1912.

== Legacy ==
=== Anarchist circles ===
During his lifetime, Perrare was nicknamed 'Chicago' in the anarchist circles in which he was involved.

After his death, both Le Libertaire and Les Temps Nouveaux paid tribute to him. Both publications emphasized Perrare's unwavering commitment, presenting him as one of the rare anarchists who never betrayed his ideas and remained an anarchist until his death. The tribute article in Les Temps Nouveaux was signed by his former companion, Jean Grave. Max Nettlau considered him one of the first anarcho-communists.

=== Police mugshot ===
His police mugshot is part of the collections of the Metropolitan Museum of Art (MET).

== Bibliography ==
- Bébin, Lionel (1996). Les tentatives de reconstitution de la première Internationale et les débuts du mouvement anarchiste à Lyon (1871-1881) [Attempts to reconstitute the First International and the beginnings of the anarchist movement in Lyon (1871-1881))] (Master's thesis) (in French). Lumière University Lyon 2. pp. 58–65. OCLC 494050797.
