= Auguste Bordes =

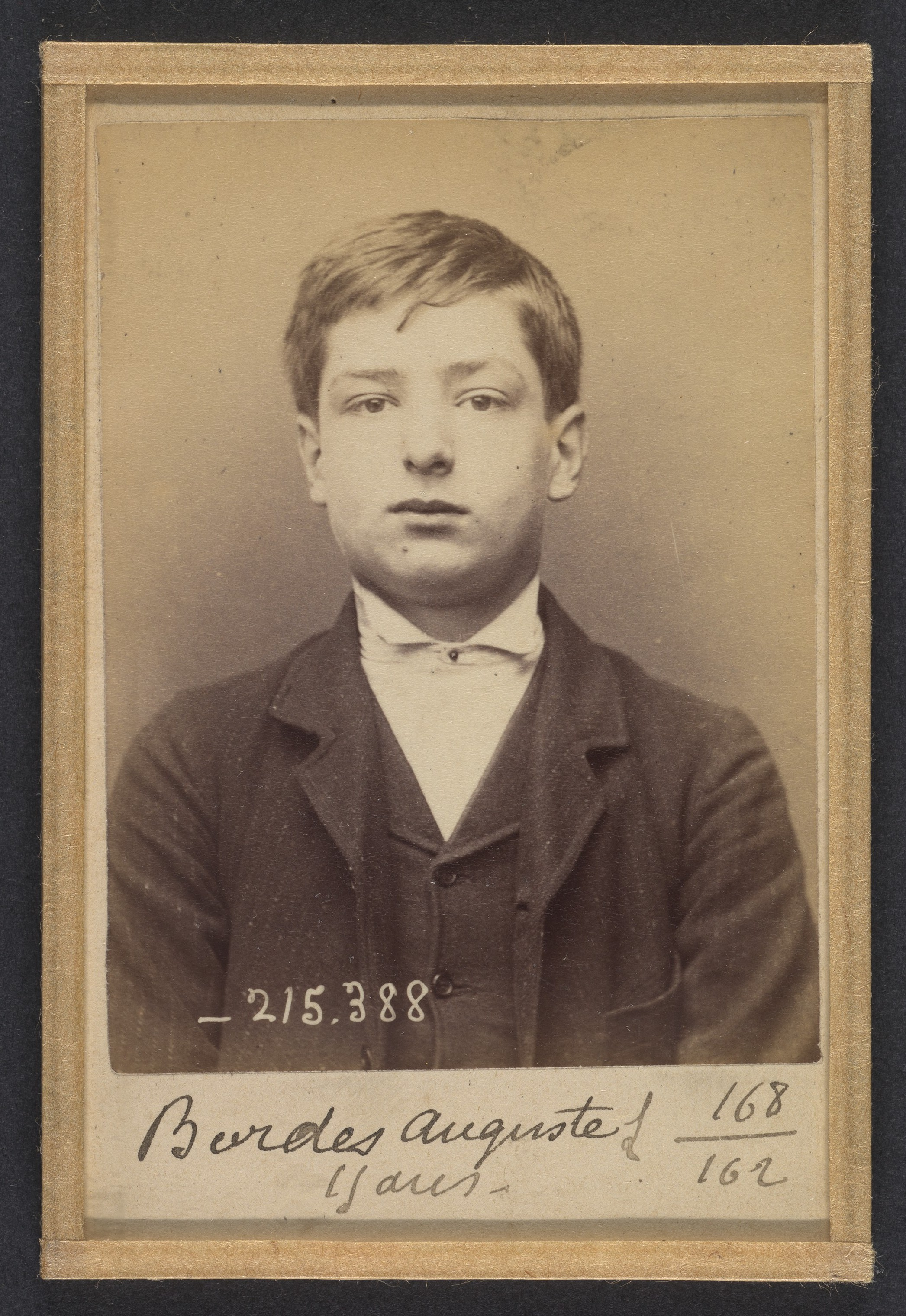
- Auguste Borde's mugshot taken by Alphonse Bertillon (Anthropometric File of Anarchists - 1894)
- Born: February 12, 1879; Paris, France
- Died: December 22, 1896 (aged 17); Paris, France
- Occupation: Waiter
- Movement: Anarchism

Auguste Bordes, born in Paris on 12 February 1879 and who died in the same city on 22 December 1896, was a French waiter and anarchist. Born into an anarchist family, he followed his father into exile in London when he was just five years old. The family was repatriated to Paris in 1893 due to poverty, and he began working as a waiter for a wine merchant. During the repression of early 1894, he was at the Duprat cabaret during a police raid targeting it—he managed to escape to the home of Louise Pioger, but was arrested there. He was quickly released. Bordes died two years later from an intestinal abscess.

His police mugshot is part of the collections of the Metropolitan Museum of Art (MET). He was 15 years old when the photo was taken, making him one of the youngest people in the collection.

== Biography ==
Auguste Joseph Bordes was born in Paris on 12 February 1879. Bordes was born into an anarchist family and was the son of Guillaume Auguste Bordes, also known as Sedrob, who went into exile in the United Kingdom after deserting in 1884. In 1893, the family, who were very poor, were repatriated to France by the Société de Bienfaisance Française. Auguste Bordes then began working as a waiter for a wine merchant in Paris.

In March 1894, during the repression of January and February 1894, he was at the Duprat cabaret, run by Louis Duprat and Louise Pioger, which was a gathering place for anarchists in France, when it was raided. The police raid was very violent; over forty officers came down and manhandled the people in the establishment, who fought with the police. Bordes managed to escape and take refuge in the home of Pioger and her son-in-law Benoît Morel, but the police eventually arrested him there shortly after.

An old woman went to the police station and stated that Bordes had nothing to do with any of the trouble and that the police had beaten him. He was bertilloned in the following days and then released.

Bordes died two years later, on 22 December 1896, from an intestinal abscess. Le Libertaire described him as follows:

He was one of those young men who were fortunate enough to grow up in an anarchist environment and who, with the enthusiasm of youth and the reasoned conviction of maturity, threw themselves ardently into the revolutionary movement.

== Legacy ==
=== Police mugshot ===
His police mugshot is part of the collections of the Metropolitan Museum of Art (MET). He was 15 years old when the photo was taken, making him one of the youngest people in the collection.

== Bibliography ==
- Petit, Dominique (2024), BORDES Auguste, Joseph, Paris: Le Maitron
- Dupuy, Rolf; Enckell, Marianne (2024), BORDES Guillaume, Auguste, Paris: Le Maitron
- Petit, Dominique; S, P. (2025), "BORDES, Auguste", Dictionnaire international des militants anarchistes, Paris
