= Communards =

Members and supporters of the short-lived 1871 Paris Commune

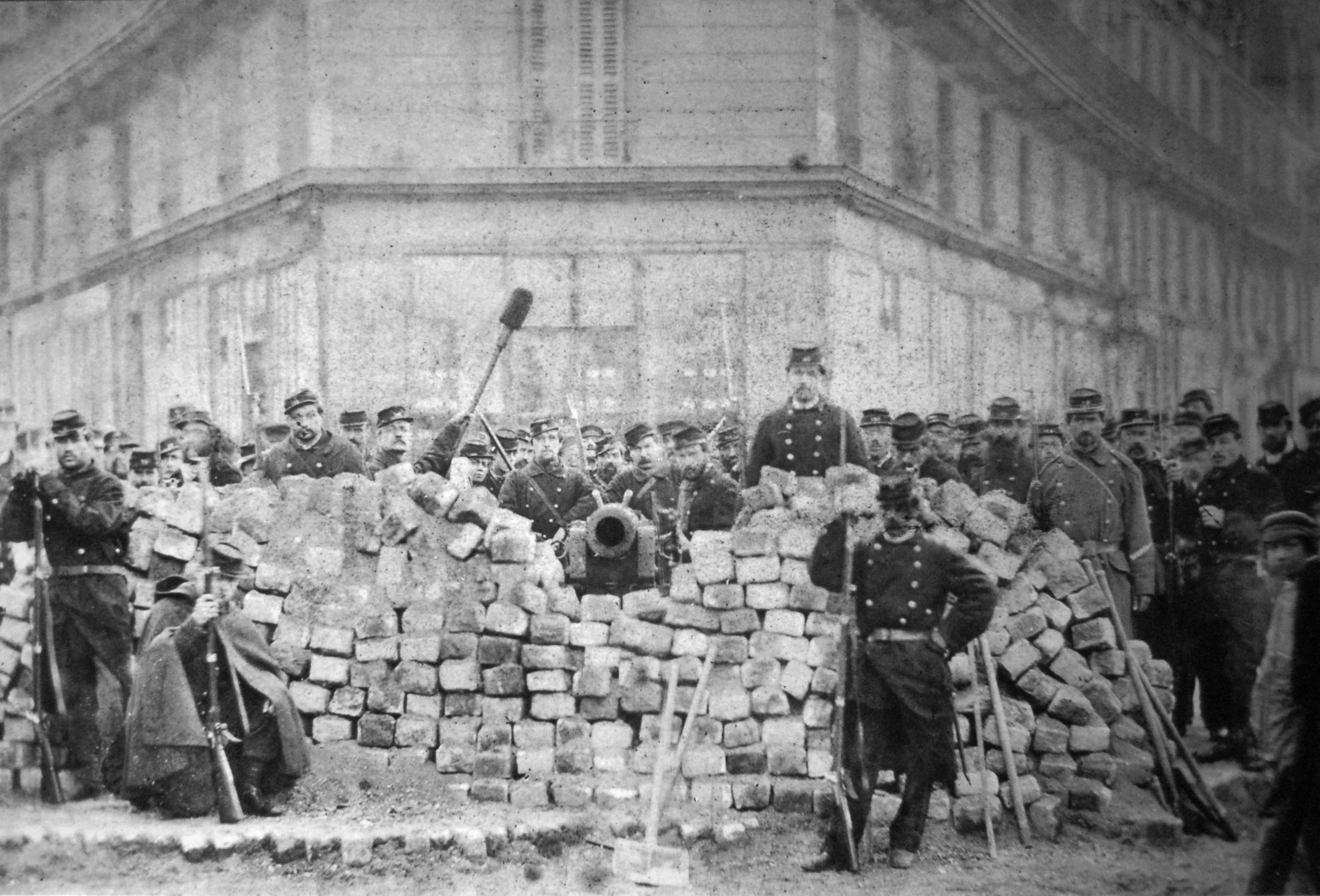
Communards (National Guards) at Boulevard Voltaire

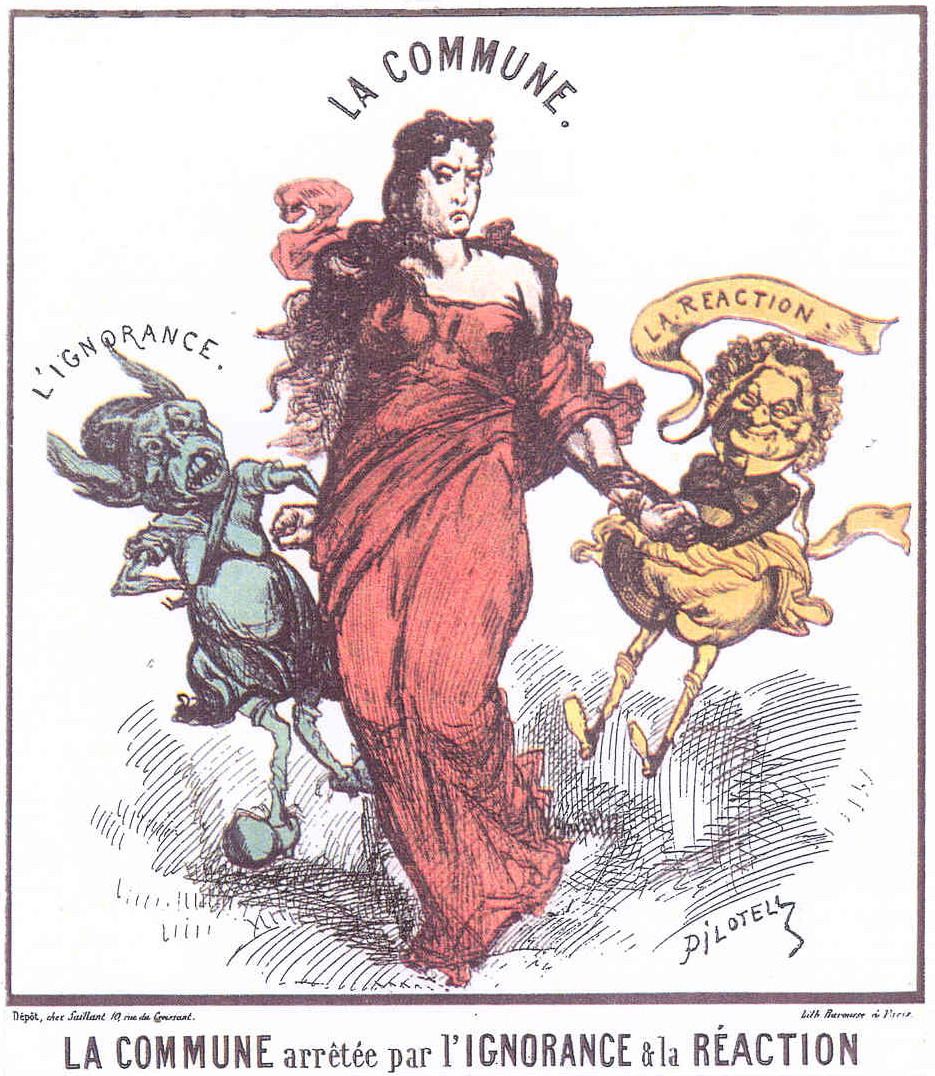
"The Commune stopped by Ignorance and Reaction"

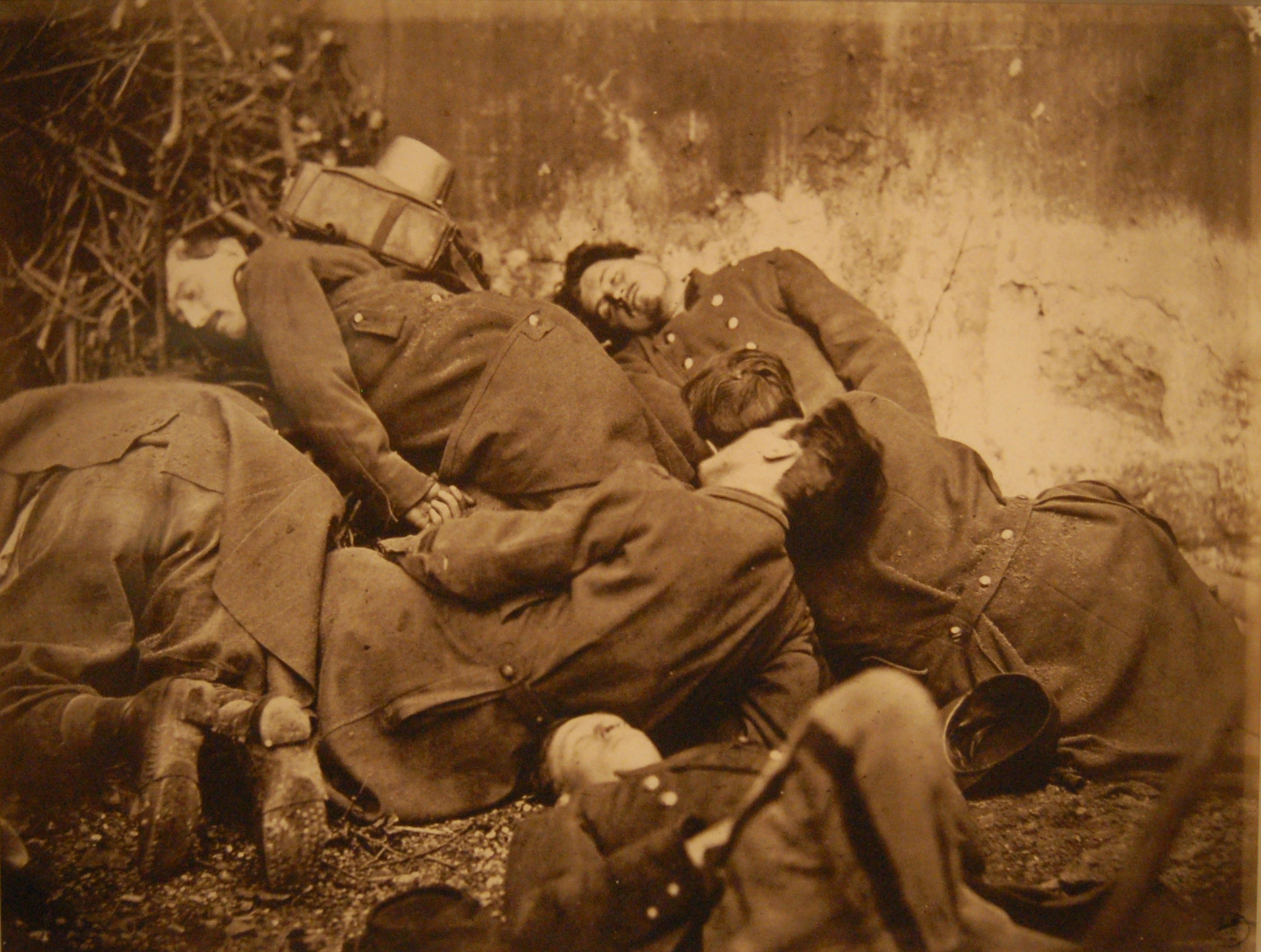
Executed Communards (National Guards)

The Communards (French: [kɔmynaʁ]) were members and supporters of the short-lived 1871 Communes in France formed in the wake of the French defeat in the Franco-Prussian War.

After the suppression of the Paris Commune by the French Army in May 1871, 43,000 Communards were taken prisoner, and 6,500 to 7,500 fled abroad. The number of Communard soldiers killed in combat or executed afterwards during the week has long been disputed—Prosper-Olivier Lissagaray put the number at 20,000, while estimates by more recent historians put the probable number between 10,000 and 15,000. 7,500 were jailed or deported under arrangements which continued until a general amnesty during the 1880s; this action by Adolphe Thiers forestalled the proto-communist movement in the French Third Republic (1871–1940).

== Franco-Prussian War and the Paris Commune ==
The working class of Paris were feeling ostracized after the decadence of the Second Empire and the Franco-Prussian War. The Prussians besieged Paris in September 1870, causing suffering among Parisians. The poor ate cat or rat meat or went hungry. Out of resentment from this situation grew radical and socialist political clubs and newspapers. While Paris was occupied, socialist groups tried twice to overthrow the provisional government.

In January 1871, Otto von Bismarck and the French minister of foreign affairs, Jules Favre, decided that France would hold national elections. Adolphe Thiers, who had been loyal to the Second Empire, was elected head of the new republic. During the war, the capital had moved from Paris to Bordeaux. When the war ended, the government moved temporarily to Versailles. In the early morning of March 18, the government stationed in Versailles sent military forces into Paris to collect a reserve of cannons. The detachment was gathering the guns when units of the Paris national guard surrounded them, and killed two French army generals. By the end of the day, the insurgent soldiers of the national guard controlled the city. They declared a new government called the Paris Commune, which lasted from March 18 to May 28, 1871.

Thiers refused to bargain with the Communards, despite their attempts to do so. He taught newly released French soldiers the "evils" of the Communards as the government prepared for a battle. The Commune responded by building barricades in the Paris streets. Starting on May 21 and continuing through May 28, the French army entered Paris and gradually recaptured the city. Around eighteen thousand communards were killed in combat, more were executed afterwards. The violence of The "Bloody Week" became a rallying cry for the working classes; some politicians would later proudly brag about their participation with the Commune.

== Deportation ==
After Bloody Week, the government asked for an inquest into the causes of the uprising. The inquest concluded that the main cause of the insurrection was a lack of belief in God, and that this problem had to be corrected immediately. It was decided that a moral revival was needed, and a key part of this was deporting 4,500 Communards to New Caledonia, in Melanesia. There was a two-part goal in this, as the government also hoped that the Communards would "civilize" the native Kanak people on the island. The government hoped that being exposed to the order of nature would return the Communards to the side of "good."

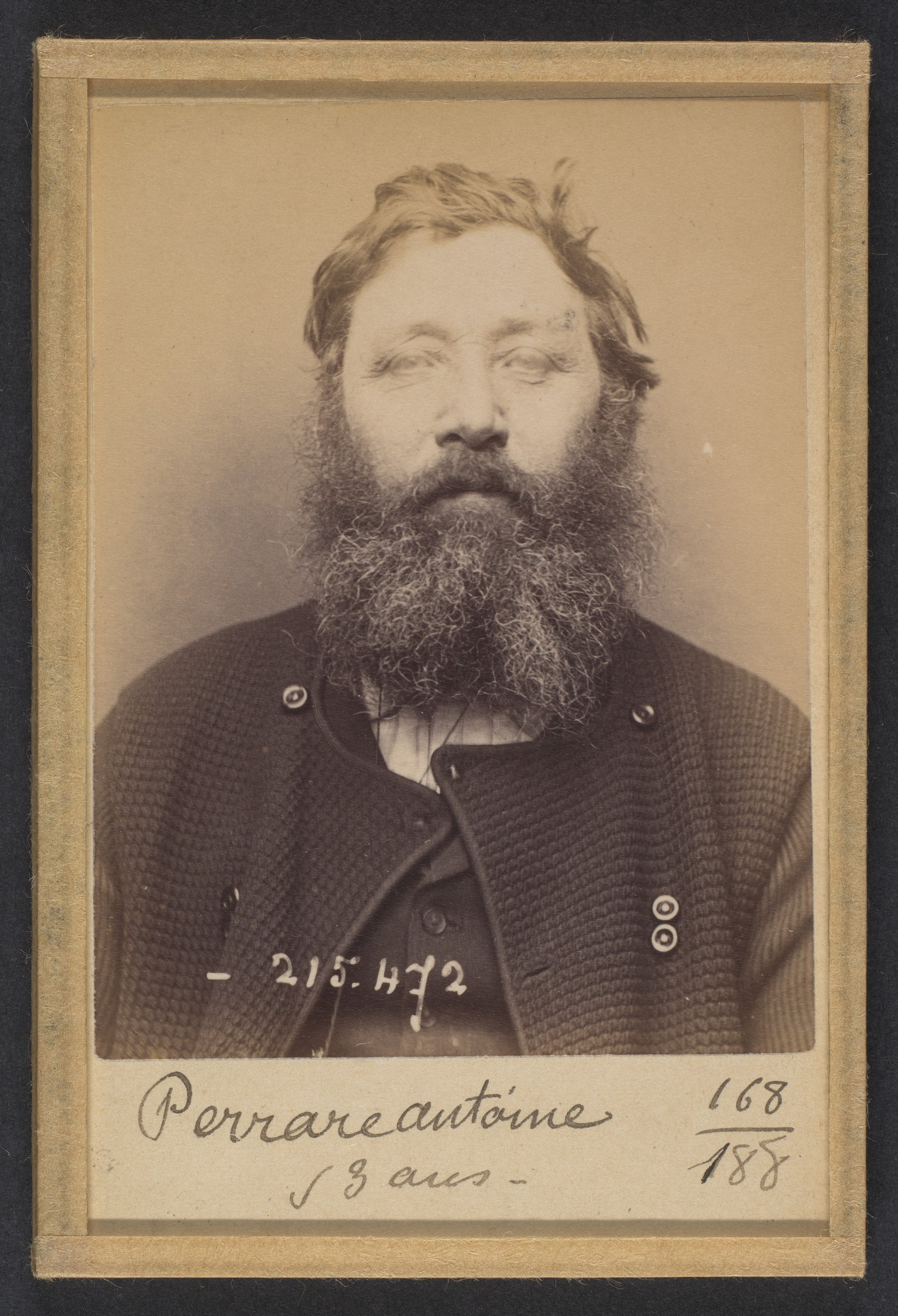
Antoine Perrare's (a former Communard and member of the Anti-authoritarian International) mugshot taken by Alphonse Bertillon (Anthropometric File of Anarchists - 1894)

New Caledonia had become a French colony in 1853, but ten years later it still only had 350 European colonists. After 1863, New Caledonia became the principal destination of convicts transported from France after French Guiana was deemed too unhealthy for people of European descent. Thereafter, convicts from France made up the largest number of arriving residents. During the busiest time of deportation, there were estimated to be about 50,000 total people on the island. This included 30,000 Kanak, 2,750 civilian colonists, 3,030 military personnel, 4,000 déportés (political criminals, including the Communards), 6,000 transportés (criminal convicts under the regular civil law), and 1,280 criminal convicts who had served their sentences but were still living on the island. There were four main penitentiary sites on the island, one of which, Isle of Pines (1870–1880), was for the Communards deportees exclusively.

== Sentences ==
There were three sentences given out to the déportés: simple deportation, deportation to a fortified place, and deportation with forced labor. A simple deportation sentence was given to about two-thirds of the Communards. These people were sent to live in small villages on the Isle of Pines. Those sentenced to deportation to a fortified place were sent to the Ducos peninsula. About 300 Communards were sentenced to deportation with forced labor; these were the people convicted of crimes such as arson in addition to their political crimes. They were sent to be with the criminal convicts on the main island ('Grande Terre'). Some prisoners’ sentences were changed by the local penal administrators, and some were changed by the French government after petitions for leniency.

== Life in New Caledonia ==
The government did not give out enough food, clothing, or shelter for all of the déportés. Some were assigned housing in rickety structures, but others had to find their own materials to build huts. Construction tools could be bought from the administration. Hunting for food became part of the daily routine. Some even traded their clothing for food with the Kanak. Not every part of life on the island was bad, however. Those living on the Isle of Pines and Ducos peninsula had freedom of movement, allowing them to live where they wanted and swim and fish at their leisure. They lived in simple wood huts that formed small, face-to-face communities that were intended to be self-governing.

Those sentenced to forced labor often endured abuse at the hands of their jailers. They were habitually mistreated while imprisoned, with whippings and the use of thumbscrews as common punishments for minor infractions. The National Assembly passed legislation that gave the wives and children of déportés freedom to go to New Caledonia. It also gave wives a much greater right to property than they had in France, giving them half the property rights over any grant given to their husbands. Through this legislation, 174 families making up 601 people were reunited by 1877.

== Escape ==
The relatively 'laid back' period of deportation ended when six déportés successfully escaped from the Ducos peninsula in 1874. François Jourde was the main planner of the escape, which he developed while living in the port town of Nouméa. He had developed connections with a ship's captain, John Law, who was paid for his participation. The escapees, who included Jourde, Henri Rochefort, Paschal Grousset, Olivier Pain, Achille Ballière, and Bastien Grandhille, boarded the boat under the cover of darkness and hid in the ship's hold until they cleared the harbor. Law dropped them off in Sydney, Australia, where crowds gathered to see them. Reports of their escape and the strict conditions they had lived under were printed in newspapers in Australia, the United States, and Europe. While the escapees attempted to publicize the plight of those still on the island, the déportés who remained had to deal with the repercussions of the escape. New rules forbade the prisoners from approaching the sea without permission, subjected them to daily roll calls, and banned them from entering the forests, even to collect firewood.

== Relationships with the Kanak ==
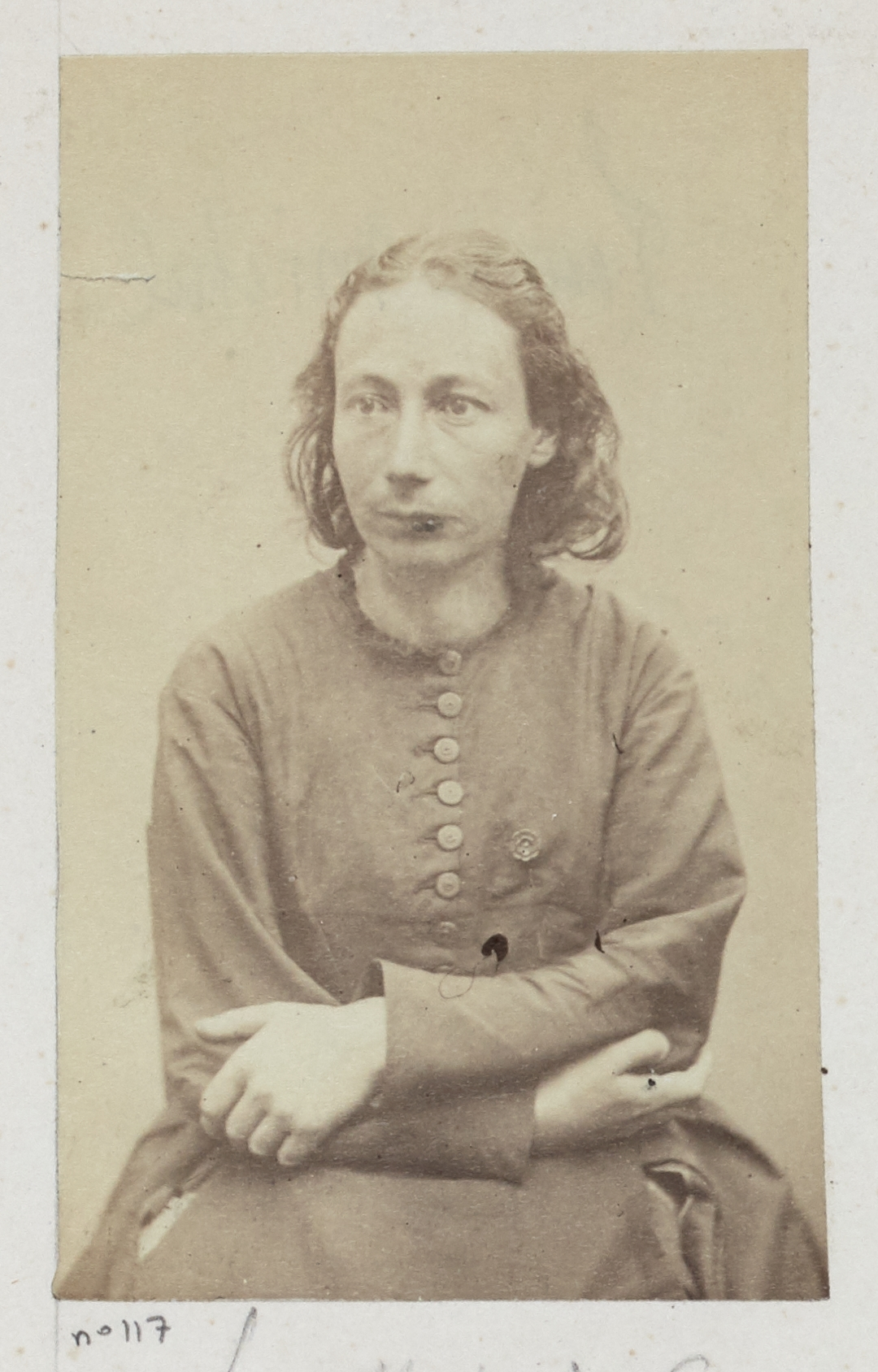
Louise Michel

There are clearly documented examples of friendships between the Communards and the Kanak. Achille Ballière and his friends visited the Kanak in their homes, shared meals with them, and played with their children. In the first few years of the deportation there were at least two marriages between the Kanak and Communards. However, the separation of the groups enforced after the 1874 escapes prevented any more such relationships from forming. During the eight-month-long Kanak insurrection in 1878, the Communards displayed a solidarity with their effort in the local press. This solidarity did not last long, however, as beliefs of racial differences soon took over.

Louise Michel looked to the Kanak youth for guidance and inspiration, and offered them moral support when they joined the 1878 insurrection. She ran a school for the Kanak and encouraged a local theater to perform a Kanak drama. She fully expected the achievements of the Kanak to match those of the French, though she wrote about them in very paternalistic terms that were common for her time period.

== Famous Communards ==
Henri Rochefort gave a series of lectures that were published in the New York Herald Tribune while staying in the United States after his escape from New Caledonia. They were highly critical of the French government for denying its citizens liberty. His 1884 novel L’Évadé: roman canaque helped shape the legend of the deportation. It offered a portrayal of the deportation and the policies of the government in New Caledonia that was different from what the governmental propaganda was promoting.

George Pilotell (1845–1918) was the son of a Judge but pursued art and moved to Paris in 1862. As a prolific political caricaturist he was frequently imprisoned and became an active member of the commune in which he appointed himself 'Directeur des Beaux Arts' but later properly appointed a 'commissaire special'. In 1874 he escaped a death sentence by fleeing to London. While he was well known for his caricatures in France, he gained a reputation in England as a fashion designer, society portrait painter and theatre costume designer. He has work in the National Portrait Gallery, the British Museum and the Victoria and Albert Museum.

Adrien Lejeune was famously the last surviving communard when he died at 94 years' old in the Soviet Union in 1942.

== Amnesty ==
By the summer of 1878, the concern of amnesty for the Communards had become a significant political issue for France. In January 1879, the prime minister Jules Armand Dufaure granted mass pardons for the Communards in an attempt to stop the calls for amnesty. The pardons excused the convictions of the Communards. This was a problem for many people who had never actually been convicted but only indicted. On January 16, the government published a list of déportés whose sentences were pardoned. These people were allowed to return to France; however, more than one thousand Communards were not included in this list. Men who had been convicted of crimes other than political, or whose political opinions were considered too dangerous, were left behind.

After the announcement of the pardons, many people in France were hoping for a stronger declaration of total amnesty. Petitions were passed around in all Paris neighborhoods to try and influence the government. A bill calling for total amnesty was introduced into the Chamber of Deputies by Louis Blanc and into the senate by Victor Hugo. The legislation that was eventually pushed through ensured full civil rights to those not convicted of crimes beyond political, and officially ended the prosecution of Communards in military courts. In July 1880, parliament finally voted for total amnesty.

Nine ships brought the déportés back to France. The first arrived in August 1879 and the last arrived in July 1880. Large crowds greeted the ships with celebrations. Donations of money were collected for the Communards and festivals were held to raise money. A committee of aid, headed by Louis Blanc and Victor Hugo, planned a dinner at which they dispersed a small amount of money to all who attended. Offers of employment were made, overcoats were given out, and temporary housing was offered.

== Aftermath ==
Some Communards chose never to come back to France after having built successful lives in New Caledonia or adopting other countries, such as Australia, as home. Many Communards who did come back returned to public life, such as Louise Michel; however, many found the adjustment to freedom difficult. Meetings between Communards and their former jailers occurred in the streets, at times leading to minor skirmishes. In December 1879, an investigative committee was formed to look into charges of torture in New Caledonia. The inquiry lasted two years, collecting the results of previous government studies, more than forty depositions, and testimonials to parliament by the Communards. The Communards' memories of abuse then became public record, which helped to heal the relations between the former prisoners and the state. The Soviet Union named many places as Kommunarka, such as Kommunarka, where Kommunarka shooting ground was located.

== See also ==
- Communards' Wall in the Père-Lachaise cemetery
- Communism
- French Third Republic
- Socialism

=== Database ===
- Jean-Claude Farcy, La répression judiciaire de la Commune de Paris : des pontons à l’amnistie (1871-1880) [the judicial repression of the Paris Commune (1871–1880)], put online on 26 September 2019, URL : https://communards-1871.fr
