= Appoline Schrader =

French artist and anarchist

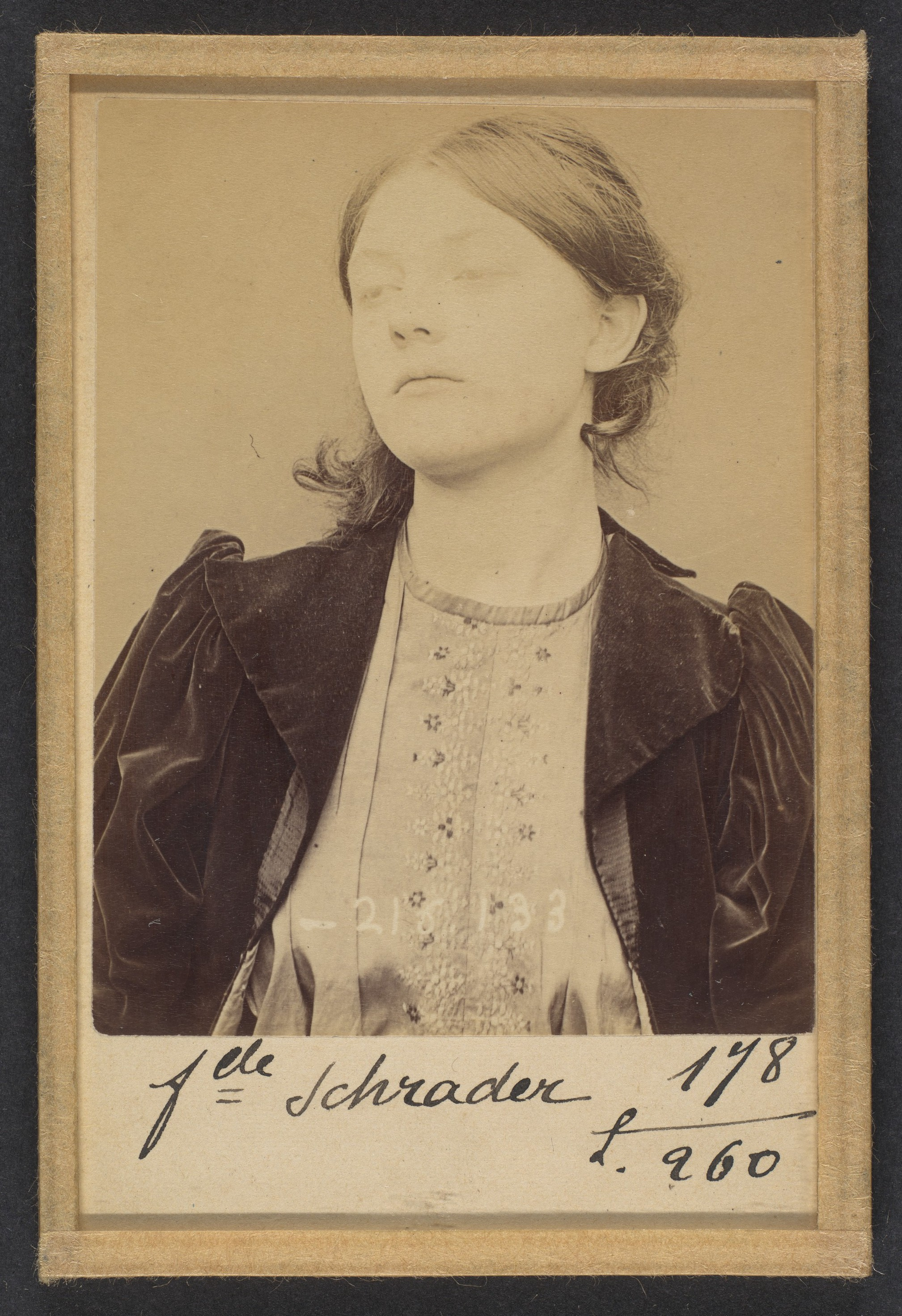
- Schrader's mugshot by Alphonse Bertillon (1894)
- Born: 21 October 1874; Paris, France
- Died: 27 February 1929 (aged 54); Évreux, France
- Occupations: Artist, sculptor, anarchist, possible police informant
- Movement: Anarchism

Appoline Wilhelmine Schrader (1874–1929), known as "Mina" or "Minna" among other names, was a French artist, sculptor, and anarchist.

Born into a working-class family, she joined French artistic and anarchist circles. Schrader interacted with and inspired a number of artists, such as Rodin and Willy. She was targeted in 1894 as an anarchist and arrested by authorities, before being released a few days later, after which she continued her artistic activities.

Schrader died in 1929, interned at the Évreux hospital. Her police mugshot is part of the collections of the Metropolitan Museum of Art (MET) in New York.

According to 21st-century historians, she might be the "policeman in a skirt" mentioned by Auguste Liard-Courtois, describing an anarchist activist who was a police informant and very knowledgeable about the anarchist movement.

== Biography ==
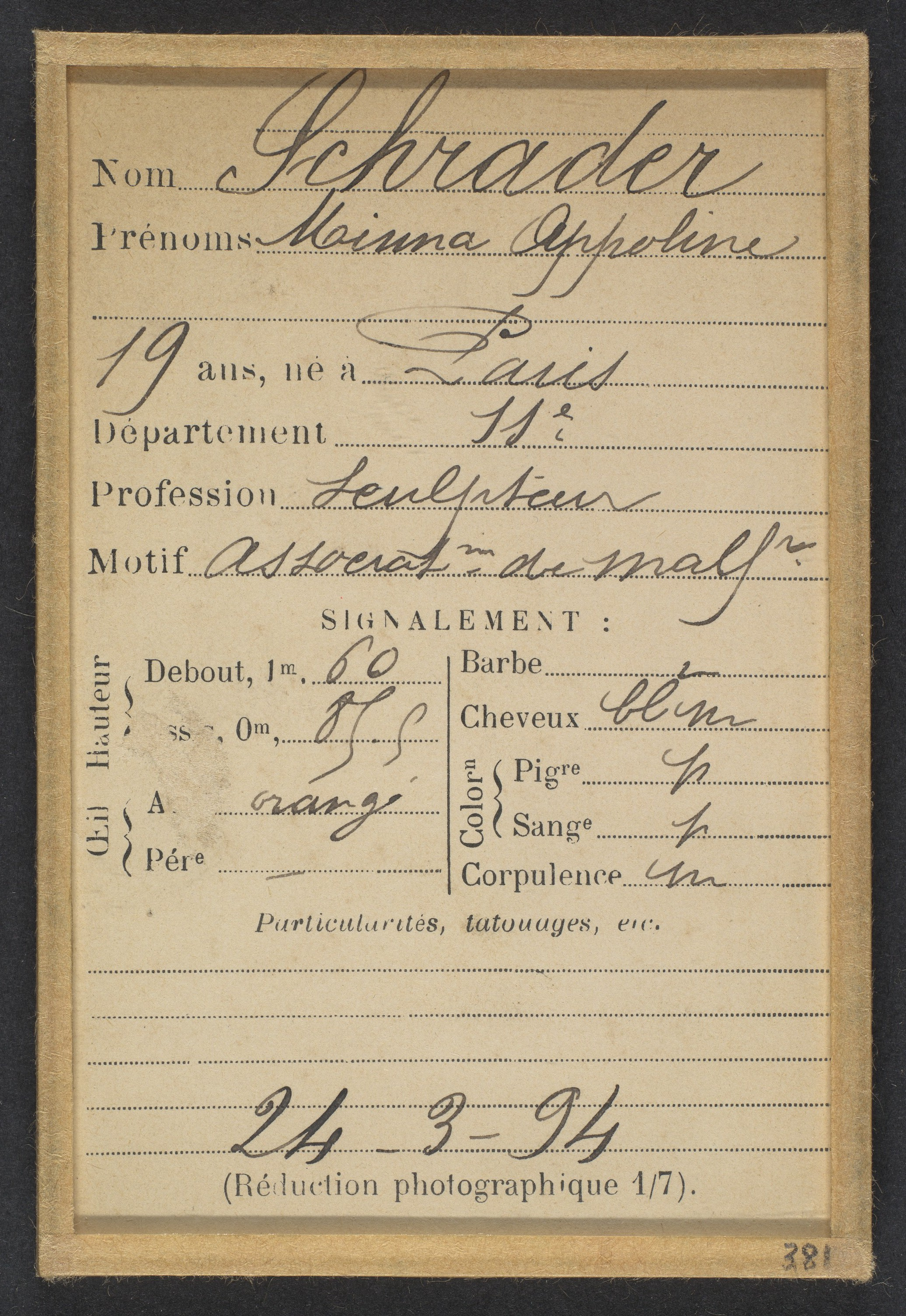
Bertillon's file on Appoline Schrader

Appoline Wilhelmine Schrader was born on 21 October 1874, in the 11th arrondissement of Paris. She came from a working-class background; her mother was a seamstress and her father an umbrella maker.

Schrader became integrated into the artistic circles of Montmartre, even serving as a lady-in-waiting to the model Sarah Brown. She corresponded with dozens of artists, the most well-known being Rodin. She also had connections with Henri Beaulieu and the anarchist Henri Gauche. She adopted numerous nicknames within artistic circles, such as "Mina de Nyzot, Mina Schrader de Nysold, Mina Schrader de Wegt de Nizeau".

=== Arrest and imprisonment ===
In March 1894, her home at 11 rue Berthe was raided as part of the crackdown on the anarchist movement. Refusing to sign the raid warrant, Schrader was mistreated by a police officer; she resisted, leaving her bathrobe in his hands as she found herself naked.

During her incarceration, she was photographed as an anarchist by Alphonse Bertillon's service. She remained imprisoned for five days before being released. She wrote to La Libre Parole to report her arrest and corrected the newspaper, stating that she was not a model but a sculptor. She declared:

"It was on Good Friday that I was arrested. Taken to the Depôt, men made me undress to measure me. It's absolutely outrageous. After that, I was incarcerated in an infected cell, full of vermin, and I slept or tried to sleep there on a bed as hard as a plank. I was then paraded, across the Palace, to the investigating judge, Mr. Meyer. He questioned me vaguely, his voice muffled. Finally, I still wouldn't know why I was arrested, if the police commissioner, Mr. Archer, hadn't hinted that I was suspected of having relations with Henri Gauche and Henri Beaulieu, anarchists, it seems; but above all, that they wanted to punish me for having an ironic article in La Libre Parole about my first search. It's ridiculous. I was very emotional about all these events. To top it all off, my correspondence was seized, and now my home is being watched by such terrible individuals that I no longer dare to go back."

=== Later life and death ===
Following her release, Schrader served as a model for Willy's heroine in his work, La Passade. She is believed to have had intimate relationships with Gabriel-Albert Aurier and Rémy de Gourmont.

She was interned for a time after reportedly firing a revolver at the deputy and industrialist Lazare Weiller.

In 1897, Schrader served as inspiration for the heroine of Willy's Maîtresse d’esthètes, written by Jean de Tinan. In 1901, she was assaulted at her mother's home by gilded workers who entered their courtyard and struck her and her sister, Rose Schrader.

Interned at the Évreux hospital, she died there on 27 February 1929.

== Legacy ==
=== Suspected collaboration with the police ===
According to Dominique Petit and Rolf Dupuy, Schrader may be the "policeman in a skirt" mentioned by Auguste Liard-Courtois in his Memoirs. Liard-Courtois describes an unnamed female anarchist police informant, whom he characterizes as a beautiful and elegant young woman. The anarchist activist had an eight-day relationship with this informant in Tours, during which she questioned him about the anarchist movement. She showed a particular interest in learning more and already knew all the anarchist speakers of the time and the exact locations where they had given speeches. According to Liard-Courtois, he eventually learned from her that she was an informant and how much money she was paid—but he does not name the person in question.

The identification with Schrader is considered plausible by both historians because it could explain why the police targeted her in 1894—possibly to force her to collaborate and become an informant.

=== Police mugshot ===
Her police mugshot is part of the collections of the Metropolitan Museum of Art (MET).

== Bibliography ==
- Ebel, Louise (2019), Excessives : Destins de femmes incroyables au XIXe siècle, Paris: Favre, ISBN 978-2-8289-1794-4
- Petit, Dominique; Dupuy, Rolf (2025), "SCHRADER, Appoline, Wilhelmine « MINNA »", Dictionnaire international des militants anarchistes, Paris
- Petit, Dominique (2024), "SCHRADER Appoline, Wilhelmine « Mina »", Dictionnaire des anarchistes (Le Maitron), Paris: Le Maitron des anarchistes
