= Charles Léger =

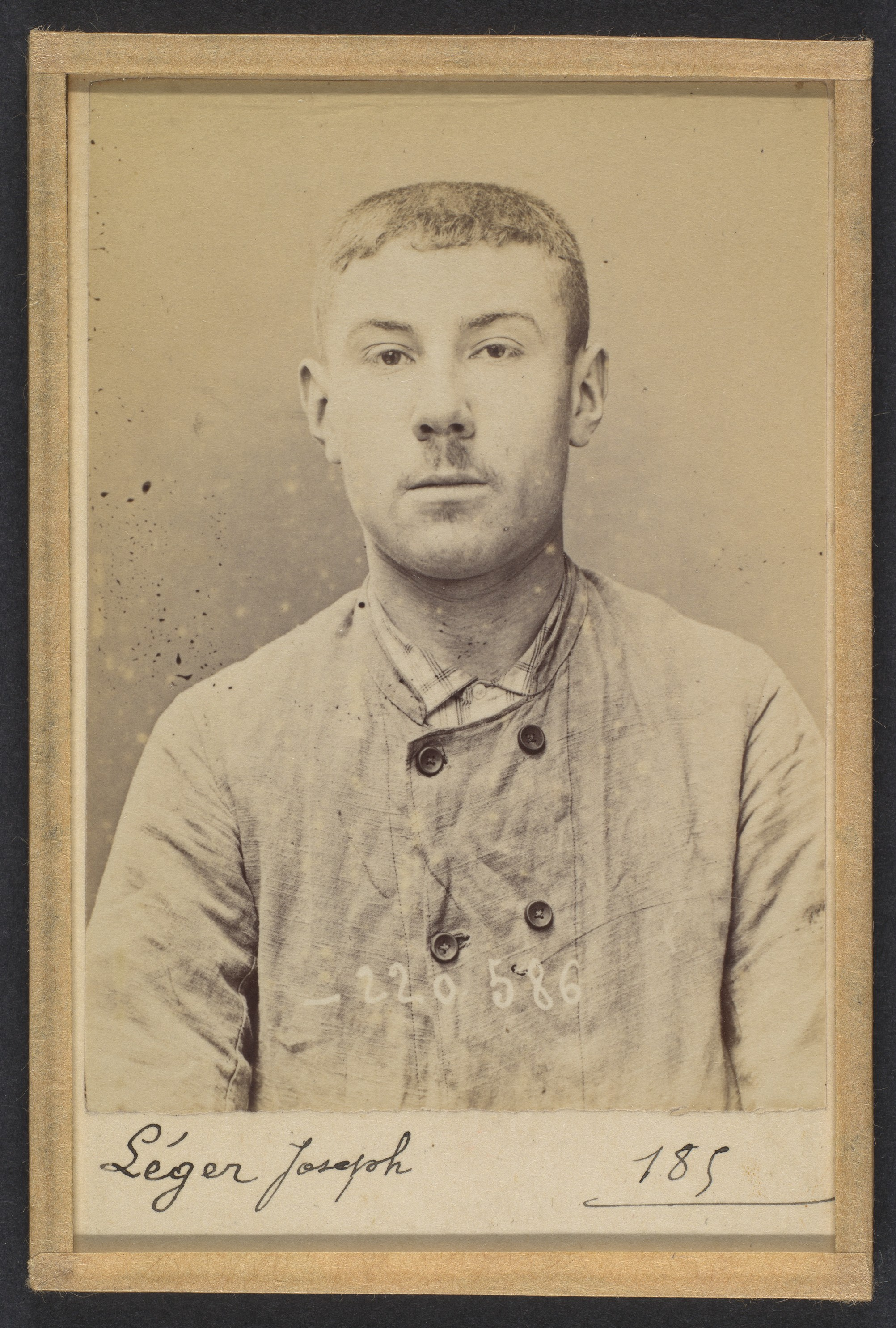
- Charles Léger's mugshot by Alphonse Bertillon (1894)
- Born: 19 October 1877; Marseille
- Died: 17 August 1917 (aged 39); Mont-Notre-Dame
- Occupations: gardener, anarchist, terrorist (?)
- Height: 162 cm (5 ft 4 in)
- Movement: Anarchism

Charles Léger (1877-1917) was a French gardener and anarchist. He is primarily known for his arrest in 1894 while in the process of making explosive devices, possibly intended for an anarchist attentat.

Following his release, he moved to Paris, married, and died at the front during World War I. His police mugshot, taken by Alphonse Bertillon's service, is part of the collections of the Metropolitan Museum of Art (MET) in New York City.

== Biography ==
Charles Joseph Ferdinand Léger was born in Marseille on 19 October 1877 or 15 June 1877. He was an orphan and was therefore taken in by family members in Lyon. His legal guardian was Victor Doullens, residing on rue de Cambronne in Paris.

In July 1893, Doullens placed him at the Beaufroy farm school, near Mirecourt, in the Vosges. In this establishment, he reportedly received anarchist teachings from two fellow students. One of them had previously been expelled from the farm school for theft and, having returned to Nancy, became an anarchist there. Back at the establishment, this activist reportedly influenced Léger in turn. Léger would have particularly admired Ravachol during this period.

On 11 April 1894, Léger, noted as a very quiet and solitary person, suddenly abandoned his farm school. He falsified school certificates and was hired as a gardener by a landowner in La Varenne-Saint-Hilaire. In this first job, Léger was silent and solitary; he reportedly told other gardeners that they needed "to kill everything, overturn everything, free themselves from bosses, not shy away from murder". These elements led to him being reported to the police.

On 2 July 1894, amidst the repressions following the assassination of Sadi Carnot, President of the French Republic, by Sante Caserio in Lyon, Léger was arrested and his home raided. When two gendarmes arrived at his employer's to arrest him, the employer initially refused, considering Léger a good employee and believing it was a mistake – he almost turned the gendarmes away – but, faced with their insistence, he let them in. Léger was arrested while tending to beans and was taken to the Joinville-le-Pont police station without resisting.

At his home, authorities found a bomb he had made, sulfuric acid, and other products used to make bombs. Léger admitted to being an anarchist but claimed he intended to use the bomb to try and turn over soil for gardening work. He was sentenced to prison, and Bertillon's service took a photograph of him.

Following his release in 1896, he moved to Paris and continued to be listed as an anarchist. In 1905, he married seamstress Marie Émilie Schumacher in Saint-Bonnet-le-Troncy.

He died at the front during World War I, in Mont-Notre-Dame, on 17 August 1917.

== Legacy ==
=== Police mugshot ===
His police mugshot is part of the collections of the Metropolitan Museum of Art (MET).

== Bibliography ==
- Petit, Dominique; Samzun, Patrick (2025), "LEGER, Charles, Joseph, Ferdinand", Dictionnaire international des militants anarchistes, Paris
- Petit, Dominique (2024), "LÉGER Charles, Joseph, Ferdinand", Dictionnaire des anarchistes (Le Maitron), Paris: Le Maitron des anarchistes
