= Aimé Bligny =

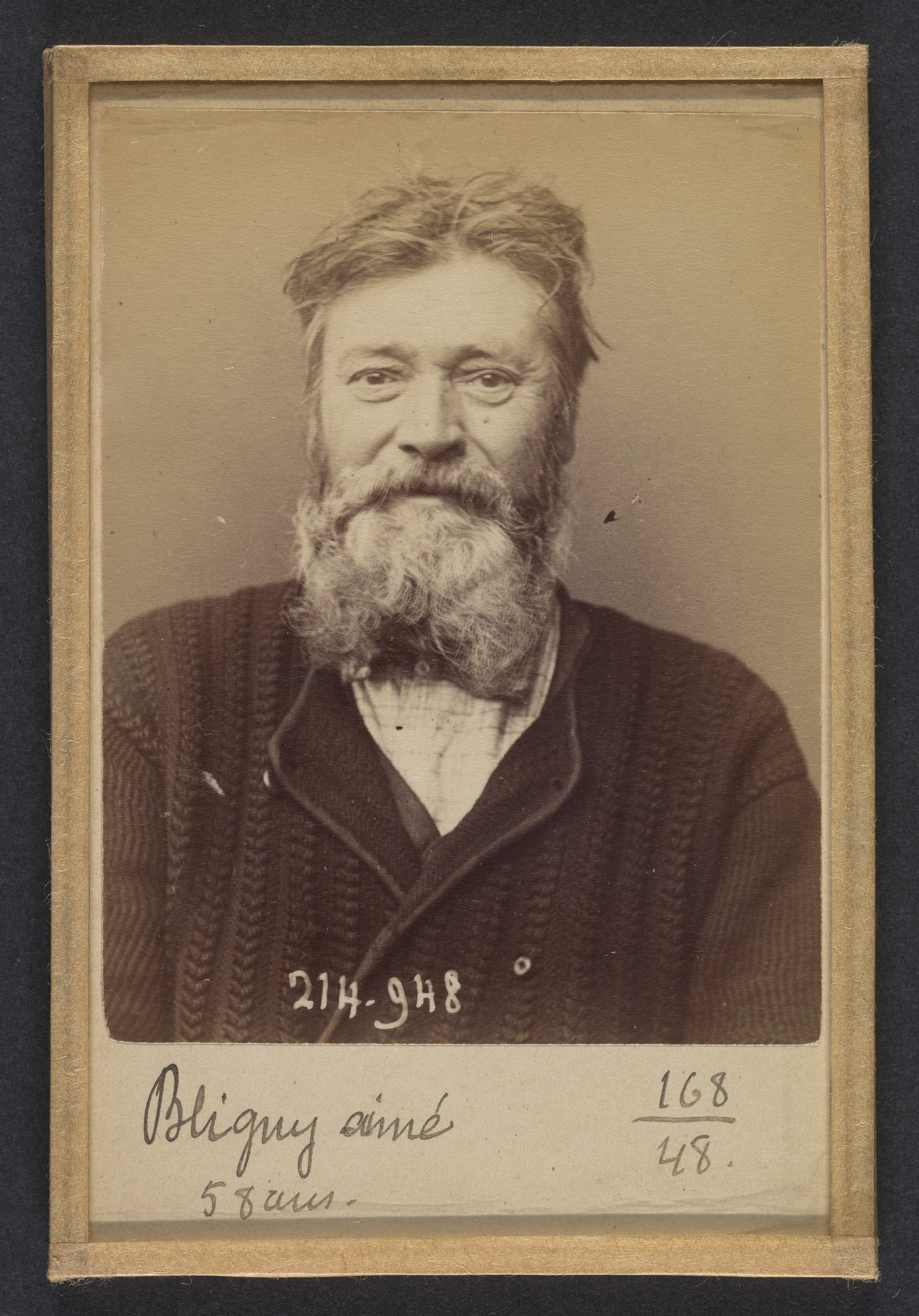
- Aimé Bligny's mugshot taken by Alphonse Bertillon (Anthropometric File of Anarchists - 1894)
- Born: Aimé Eugène Bligny; 15 July 1835; Vincennes, France
- Citizenship: France
- Occupations: Locksmith, entrepreneur
- Known for: Anarchist organizer in the eastern suburbs of Paris
- Movement: Anarchism
- Spouse: Françoise Pauline Bezouar

Aimé Bligny (1835—1907) was a French locksmith and anarchist. He was active during the 1880s and 1890s within the anarchist movement in France, organizing several meetings and anarchist groups.

Born in Vincennes and having experienced a business failure, Bligny joined the anarchist movement in France in the mid-1880s. He associated with various figures of the movement, such as Louise Michel, with whom he organized meetings, and Jean Grave, whom he reportedly accompanied to the International Congress in London in 1887 and with whom he corresponded.

He organized various groups, particularly in the eastern suburbs of Paris, such as Montreuil, where he led an abstentionist anarchist group. Although targeted by the repression of early 1894, he was released and cleared of all charges.

His police mugshot is held in the collections of the Metropolitan Museum of Art (MET).

== Biography ==
Aimé Eugène Bligny was born on 15 July 1835 in Vincennes.

He worked as a locksmith and married Françoise Pauline Bezouar, who practiced as a cartomancer and chiromancer. In 1883, Bligny suffered a bankruptcy and transferred his assets into his wife's name.

The following year, he was noted by the French authorities for having joined the anarchist movement in France. On 6 July 1884, Bligny organized his first public anarchist meeting. Between 1884 and 1888, the locksmith joined numerous anarchist groups, such as the Groupe anarchiste of Faubourg Saint Antoine, the Insurgés, the Groupe Cosmopolite, and the Chambre syndicale des hommes de peine.

In March 1886, he presided over an anarchist meeting featuring speeches by Louise Michel and Joseph Tortelier, two prominent figures of the movement. In April of that same year, Bligny presided over another meeting attended by Michel; however, a fight broke out, and he was struck in the head by a stone, resulting in an injury.

The anarchist was in contact with Jean Grave and reportedly accompanied him to the International Congress in London in 1887. Following a meeting held on 12 February 1888, alongside the La Révolution sociale group, the Group of Picpus and the Group of Montreuil, he ceased participating in meetings for several years.

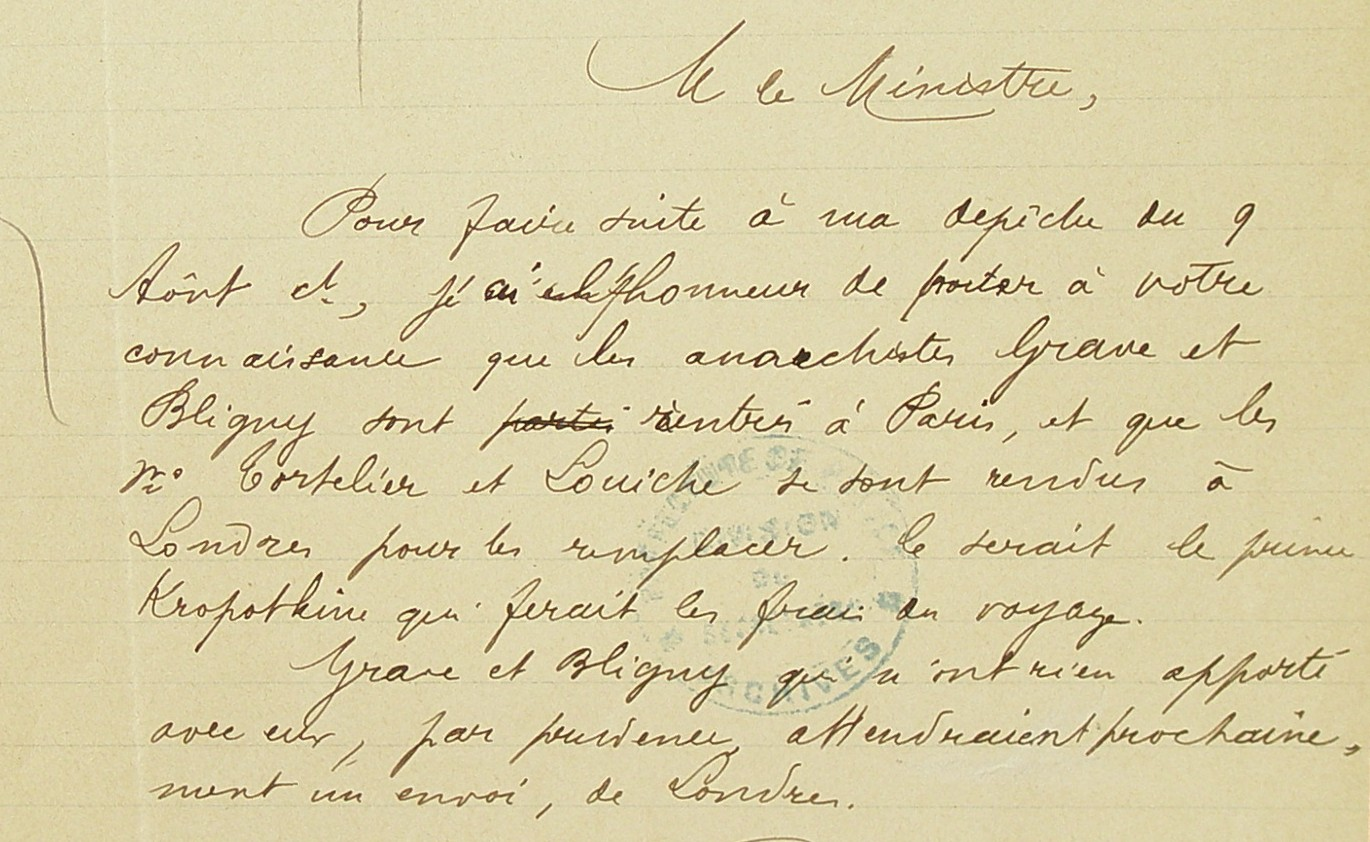
French police report documenting the movements of Jean Grave, Louiche, Joseph Tortelier, Kropotkin and Bligny surrounding the 1887 International Congress in London.

Bligny reappeared within the anarchist movement four years later, in 1892, when he was noted as a member of the group called The Anarchist Youth of the 20th arrondissement. In June of that same year, he founded the Revolutionary Abstentionist Group of Montreuil. Furthermore, during this period, Bligny was observed participating once again in numerous meetings, such as those held by the 'Propaganda Group, the International Circle, the Equals of the 20th arrondissement, l'Autonomie individuelle, the Sociologists, and the Anarchist Commune', according to historian Dominique Petit.

Petit also identified several of the companions with whom Bligny exchanged ideas and interacted, including 'Jean Grave, Louiche, Leboucher, Hivon, Mathias Hourt, Delique, Bernard, Barthélemy, Migeon, and Bondoux'.

The anarchist was targeted during the repression of early 1894, where he was photographed by Alphonse Bertillon for his anarchist file, before being released two months later. During the raid of his home prior to his arrest on 1 March 1894, police discovered six letters from Jean Grave as well as printed materials, one titled 'To the three cows Rothschild, Carnot, Leo XIII, to death' and another titled 'The Defense of Citizen Faure'.

In 1895, he was cleared of all charges by the judicial system. That same year, he was spotted by police informants attempting to re-establish abstentionist groups in Montreuil.

Bligny died at the Saint-Antoine Hospital in Paris on 10 February 1907, at the age of 71.

== Legacy ==
=== Police mugshot ===
His police mugshot is held in the collections of the Metropolitan Museum of Art (MET).

== Bibliography ==
- Petit, Dominique (2024), "BLIGNY Aimé Eugène", Dictionnaire des anarchistes (Le Maitron), Paris: Le Maitron des anarchistes
- Dupuy, Rolf (2025), "BLIGNY, Aimé, Eugène", Dictionnaire international des militant·e·s anarchistes, Paris
