= Anthropometric File of Anarchists =

Police photographs of French anarchists

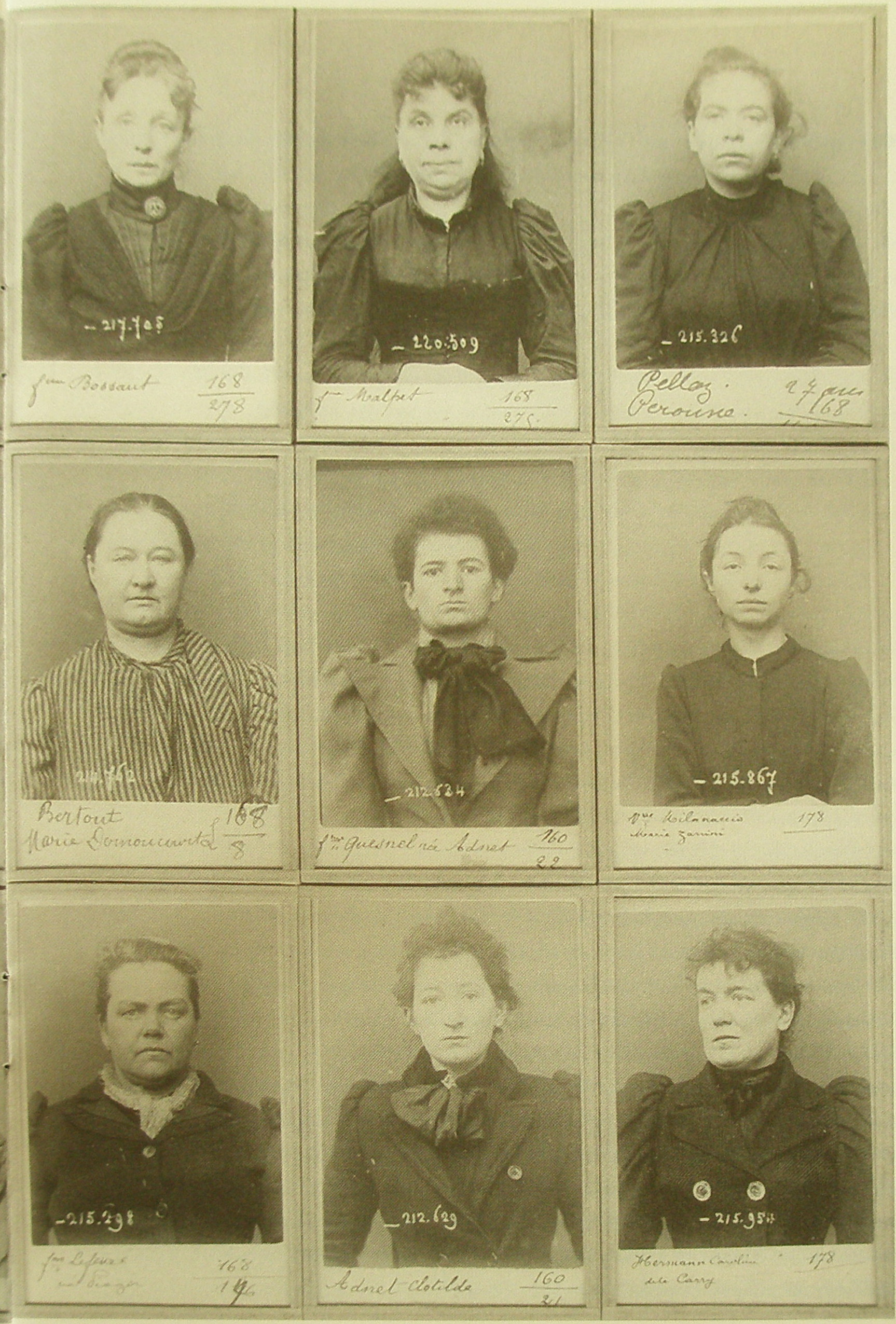
- Anarchists in the Bertillon file (MET)
- Artist: Alphonse Bertillon
- Year: 1880s–1890
- Location: New York City / Paris

The Anthropometric File of Anarchists, or more precisely, the Anthropometric Photographs of Anarchists, is a collection of hundreds of police photographs of anarchists in France. These were taken by Alphonse Bertillon and his department between the late 1880s and the 1890s.

As of 2026, the photographs are divided between the collections of the Metropolitan Museum of Art (MET) and the Archives de la préfecture de police de Paris. The entire MET collection is accessible and in the public domain.

These documents are valuable for the history of anarchism, the history of the development of police practices, and are also considered works of art. They figure among the earliest police mugshots in history.

== Anthropometric photographs of anarchists ==
=== History ===
In the closing decades of the 19th century, the French police underwent a series of transformations that led to the birth of a specific French forensic police. A significant part of this evolution was the arrival of Alphonse Bertillon at the Paris Police Prefecture in 1879. Bertillon gradually developed a filing system known as Bertillonage, also called judicial anthropometry. This innovative system was based on taking a specific number of measurements and photographs of individuals, which was intended to improve the identification of suspects or those on file.

During this same period, anarchists were developing the strategy of propaganda of the deed, with some engaging in terrorist actions targeting political or financial figures they deemed responsible for the significant repression they faced.

The convergence of these two dynamics, among other factors—especially during the period the press dubbed the Ère des attentats (1892–1894)—gave Bertillon increasing authority and credibility to file anarchists using his new methods. Between 1889 and 1894, hundreds of anarchists in France were documented upon arrest or during police raids, often being released shortly after in the latter case. These images are among the earliest police mugshots in history.

Bertillon's photographs of anarchists were studied by Italian criminologist Cesare Lombroso, an advocate of the pseudoscience of physiognomy, that social traits are visible in facial features. Lombroso claimed in 1891, "Out of forty-one Parisian Anarchists that I have studied with Bertillon at the office of the police of Paris, the proportion of the criminal type was 31 per cent."

=== Current status ===
As of 2025, the photographs are divided between the Metropolitan Museum of Art (MET) in New York City (417) and the Archives de la préfecture de police de Paris (462) in file Yb 28. Since 2017, the MET authorizes the use and dissemination of its works that have fallen into the public domain, which concern the entirety of its anthropometric collection of anarchists.

== List ==
Following is an alphabetical list of anarchists found in these collections who have a Wikipedia page – their photographs, the anarchist tendencies they can be associated with, and other relevant information about them.

The indication "Arch. pol." means that the photograph exists but is part of the Archives de la préfecture de police de Paris collections and requires express authorization for its publication.

Photograph	Name	Gender	Profession	Notable elements	Date	Age	
	Adnet Clotilde	F	embroiderer	illegalist anarchist; counterfeiter	7 January 1894	19	
	Adnet Jeanne	F	seamstress	illegalist anarchist	8 January 1894	23	
	Bastard Élisée	M	butcher	anarchist from the northern suburbs of Paris/Saint-Denis; Close to Philogone Segard and radical; Accused of the Trial of the Thirty	1893	22	
	Beaulieu Henri	M	accountant	individualist anarchist; notable antimilitarist	25 May 1894	23	
	Bertani Orsini	M	unemployed	illegalist anarchist; member of the Ortiz gang; Accused of the Trial of the Thirty	18 March 1894	24	
Arch. pol.	Bertani Orsini	M	unemployed	illegalist anarchist; member of the Ortiz gang; Accused of the Trial of the Thirty	18 March 1894	24	
	Bligny Aimé	M	locksmith	organizer of several meetings and groups in the Paris eastern suburbs	March 1894	59	
	Bordes Auguste	M	waiter	anarchist son of Gustave Auguste Bordes; One of the youngest of the collection	March 1894	15	
	Borreman Léontine	F	singer/sex worker (?)	active as a regular singer in the cabaret of Duprat and Pioger	March 1894	23	
	Brunet Georges	M	carpenter	syndicalist anarchist; Accused at the Trial of the Thirty	4 February 1894	25	
Arch. pol.		M	Caserio Sante	baker	Italian anarchist; Responsible for the assassination of Sadi Carnot	28 June 1894	21
Arch. pol.	30 June 1894	M	Caserio Sante	baker	Italian anarchist; Responsible for the assassination of Sadi Carnot		21
	Cazal Antoinette	F	server	Member of the Ortiz gang; Accused at the Trial of the Thirty	28 February 1894	31	
	Chiericotti Paolo	M	shoemaker	notable illegalist anarchist of the Ortiz gang; eventually implicated in the Berthe bombing; Sentenced to 8 years in deportation to a penal colony at the Trial of the Thirty	25 March 1894	36	
	Cler Henri	M	cabinetmaker	syndicalist anarchist; Killed by the French police in 1910	14 March 1894	31	
Arch. pol.	Cler Henri	M	cabinetmaker	syndicalist anarchist; Killed by the French police in 1910	14 March 1894	31	
	Collot Eugénie	F	upholsterer	syndicalist and feminist anarchist; "significant" figure of the period	11 March 1894	36	
	Decker Joseph	M	tailor	syndicalist anarchist; Member of numerous groups	9 March 1894	46	
	Duprat Louis	M	tailor	syndicalist anarchist; His wine shop became a gathering place for anarchists in France	27 April 1894	37	
	Etiévant Henri	M	typographer	anarchist and brother of Georges Etiévant; support of propaganda by the deed	4 March 1894	32	
	Faure Sébastien	M	journalist	important thinker of anarchism; controversial figure due to his child sexual abuse cases	20 February 1894	36	
	Fénéon Félix	M	art critic	notable anarchist of that period; Accused at the Trial of the Thirty	May 1894	32	
	Forti Ernesta	F	dairy worker	Italian anarchist owning a dairy shop who serves as a gathering place; Partner of Constant Martin	27 February 1894	46	
Arch. pol.	François Jean-Pierre	M	carpenter	individualist and illegalist anarchist; implicated in the Véry bombing	1889 ?	33	
	François Jean-Pierre	M	carpenter	individualist and illegalist anarchist; implicated in the Véry bombing	5 March 1894	38	
	Galau Louis	M	catwright	notable anarchist of the period, friends with Charles 'Cookie' Simon; His seven children join the anarchist movement for the most part	21 August 1893	53	
	Grave Jean	M	journalist	major figure of anarchist communism; nicknamed the 'pope of the Mouffetard street'	9 January 1894	38	
	Gordon Max	M	usher	Lithuanian nihilist and anarchist	2 July 1894	39	
	Henry Émile	M	accountant	individualist anarchist responsible for several bombings; important figure of the history of terrorism	1890–1894	17–21	
Arch. pol.	Jas-Béala Joseph	M	mechanic	accomplice of Ravachol for the Saint-Germain bombing	26 March 1892	27	
	Léger Charles	M	gardener	arrested in 1894 in possession of explosive materials	4 July 1894	16	
	Léveillé Louis	M	locksmith	victim of the Clichy affair	7 July 1894	36	
	Luce Maximilien	M	painter	Illustrator of Le Père Peinard	6 July 1894	36	
	Malatesta Errico	M	worker	major anarchist communist theorician and activist; expulsed from France in August–September 1892	1880s–1890s	26–40	
Arch. pol.	Malato Charles	M	journalist	notable French anarchist of the period	29 April 1890	32	
	Mahler Jacob	M	saddler	German and French anarchist; Dies in dubious circumstances while in police custody	10 March 1894	61	
	Mathieu Gustave	M	worker	Illegalist close to Placide Schouppe; Very close to Ravachol and part of Ravachol's group; One of the most wanted people in France in 1892	1890–1893 ?	24–27	
Arch. pol.	Mathieu Gustave	M	worker	Illegalist close to Placide Schouppe; Very close to Ravachol and part of Ravachol's group; One of the most wanted people in France in 1892	1889 ?	23 ?	
Arch. pol.	Mathieu Gustave	M	worker	Illegalist close to Placide Schouppe; Very close to Ravachol and part of Ravachol's group; One of the most wanted people in France in 1892	1889 ?	23 ?	
Arch. pol.	Mathieu Gustave	M	worker	Illegalist close to Placide Schouppe; Very close to Ravachol and part of Ravachol's group; One of the most wanted people in France in 1892	1889 ?	23 ?	
Arch. pol.	Mathieu Gustave	M	worker	Illegalist close to Placide Schouppe; Very close to Ravachol and part of Ravachol's group; One of the most wanted people in France in 1892	1889 ?	23 ?	
Arch. pol.	Mathieu Gustave	M	worker	Illegalist close to Placide Schouppe; Very close to Ravachol and part of Ravachol's group; One of the most wanted people in France in 1892	1889 ?	23 ?	
	Marie Constant	M	shoemaker	Communard, chansonnier and notable figure of anarchism in France	2 July 1894	53	
Arch. pol.	Meunier Théodule	M	cabinetmaker	Responsible for the Lobau bombing and the Véry bombing	1892	32	
Arch. pol.	Meunier Théodule	M	cabinetmaker	Responsible for the Lobau bombing and the Véry bombing	Same ?	32 ?	
Arch. pol.	Meunier Théodule	M	cabinetmaker	Responsible for the Lobau bombing and the Véry bombing	Same ?	32 ?	
	Ortiz Léon	M	accountant	Son of Eva Schiroky; illegalist anarchist member of the Ortiz gang; Sentenced to fifteen years of penal servitude at the Trial of the Thirty; Collaborated with French authorities	1894	25	
	Ortiz Léon	M	accountant	Son of Eva Schiroky; illegalist anarchist member of the Ortiz gang; Sentenced to fifteen years of penal servitude at the Trial of the Thirty; Collaborated with French authorities	18 March 1894	25	
Arch. pol.	Pauwels Désiré	M	tanner	Belgian anarchist close to Émile Henry; Responsible for the 20 February bombings and the Madeleine bombing	22 July 1891 ?	27	
Arch. pol.	Pauwels Désiré	M	tanner	Belgian anarchist close to Émile Henry; Responsible for the 20 February bombings and the Madeleine bombing	22 July 1891	27	
Arch. pol.	Pauwels Désiré	M	tanner	Belgian anarchist close to Émile Henry; Responsible for the 20 February bombings and the Madeleine bombing	22 July 1891	27	
Arch. pol.	Pauwels Désiré	M	tanner	Belgian anarchist close to Émile Henry; Responsible for the 20 February bombings and the Madeleine bombing	22 July 1891	27	
	Pelgrom Élise	F	passementerie worker	Belgian illegalist anarchist; Linked to the Intransigents of London and Paris	22 February 1893	28	
Arch. pol.	Pelgrom Élise	F	passementerie worker	Belgian illegalist anarchist; Linked to the Intransigents of London and Paris	22 February 1893	28	
Arch. pol.	Pelgrom Élise	F	passementerie worker	Belgian illegalist anarchist; Linked to the Intransigents of London and Paris	22 February 1893	28	
	Perrare Antoine	M	mechanic	Communard leader who joins the Anti-authoritarian International on its inception; One of the first anarcho-communists, linked to Peter Kropotkin and Jean Grave	10 July 1894	53	
Arch. pol.	Pini Vittorio	M	worker	Italian individualist anarchist; One of the founders of illegalism	20 June 1889	29	
Arch. pol.	Pini Vittorio	M	worker	Italian individualist anarchist; One of the founders of illegalism	Same ?		
Arch. pol.	Pini Vittorio	M	worker	Italian individualist anarchist; One of the founders of illegalism	Same ?		
	Pouget Émile	M	publicist	Close to Louise Michel; Organizer of Le Père Peinard; Precursor of anarcho-syndicalism	26 April 1894	31	
Arch. pol.	Pouget Émile	M	publicist	Close to Louise Michel; Organizer of Le Père Peinard; Precursor of anarcho-syndicalism	26 April 1894	31	
	Ravachol François	M	dyer	One of the most famous French anarchists; Responsible for the Saint-Germain and Clichy bombings (Ère des attentats)	27 April 1892	33	
	Reclus Paul	M	engineer	notable anarchist communist; Son of anarchist activist Élie Reclus and nephew of Élisée Reclus; His wife, Marguerite Wapler, financed the National Assembly bombing	23 December 1893	35	
	Schiroky Eva	F	cook	implicated but ultimately freed for activities related to the Ortiz gang; Mother of Léon Ortiz	21 March 1894	54	
	Segard Émilien	M	house painter	anarchist from Saint-Denis; son of Philogone Segard	1894	18	
	Segard Philogone	M	ropemaker	radical anarchist from the Saint-Denis/northern suburbs of Paris; Implicated or in link with several propaganda of the deed attempts or actions; Victim of the Clichy affair	23 April 1894	44	
	Schouppe Placide	M	mechanic	notable illegalist anarchist; escapes from the penal colony two times, including one with Vittorio Pini (1891)	1889	31	
Arch. pol	Schouppe Placide	M	mechanic	notable illegalist anarchist; escapes from the penal colony two times, including one with Vittorio Pini (1891)	1889	31	
Arch. pol	Schouppe Placide	M	mechanic	notable illegalist anarchist; escapes from the penal colony two times, including one with Vittorio Pini (1891)	1889	31	
Arch. pol	Schouppe Placide	M	mechanic	notable illegalist anarchist; escapes from the penal colony two times, including one with Vittorio Pini (1891)	1889	31	
Arch. pol	Schouppe Placide	M	mechanic	notable illegalist anarchist; escapes from the penal colony two times, including one with Vittorio Pini (1891)	1889	31	
	Schrader Appoline	F	artist	active in Parisian artistic circles; possibly a police informant	24 March 1894	19	
Arch. pol.	Soubère Rosalie	F	Newspaper distributor	Accomplice of Ravachol in the Saint-Germain bombing	26 March 1892	24	
	Soubrié François	M	miner	socialist figure before joining anarchism; Acquitted at the Trial of the Thirty	4 March 1894	39	
	Soubrier Annette	F	poultry seller	illegalist anarchist; member of the Ortiz gang; Accused at the Trial of the Thirty	25 March 1894	28	
	Spannagel Émile	M	locksmith	notable illegalist anarchist; founder of the Spannagel gang	7 July 1894	20	
	Trucano Victorina	F	hatmaker	illegalist anarchist; member of the Ortiz gang; Accused at the Trial of the Thirty	19 March 1894	54	
	Zanini Maria	F	seamstress	illegalist anarchist; member of the Ortiz gang; Accused at the Trial of the Thirty	18 March 1894	28	
	Zisly Henri	M	railway worker	individualist anarchist; Promoter of Naturian circles	26 February 1894	21	
Arch. pol.	Zisly Henri	M	railway worker	individualist anarchist; Promoter of Naturian circles	26 February 1894	21	

== Bibliography ==
- Bouhey, Vivien (2009), Les Anarchistes contre la République [The Anarchists against the Republic] (in French), Rennes: Presses universitaires de Rennes (PUR)
- Frappa, Amos (2023), Par l'encre et le sang : Histoire de la police scientifique française [By Ink and Blood: A History of French Forensic Science], Paris: A.F.I.T.T
- Schwager, Nicole (2009), "Polizeiliche Identifikationstechniken und Anarchismus in der Schweiz (1888–1904)", Traverse, vol. 16, no. 1, pp. 41–55, doi:10.5167/uzh-27333
