= Jacob Mahler (anarchist) =

German and French anarchist (1832–1894)

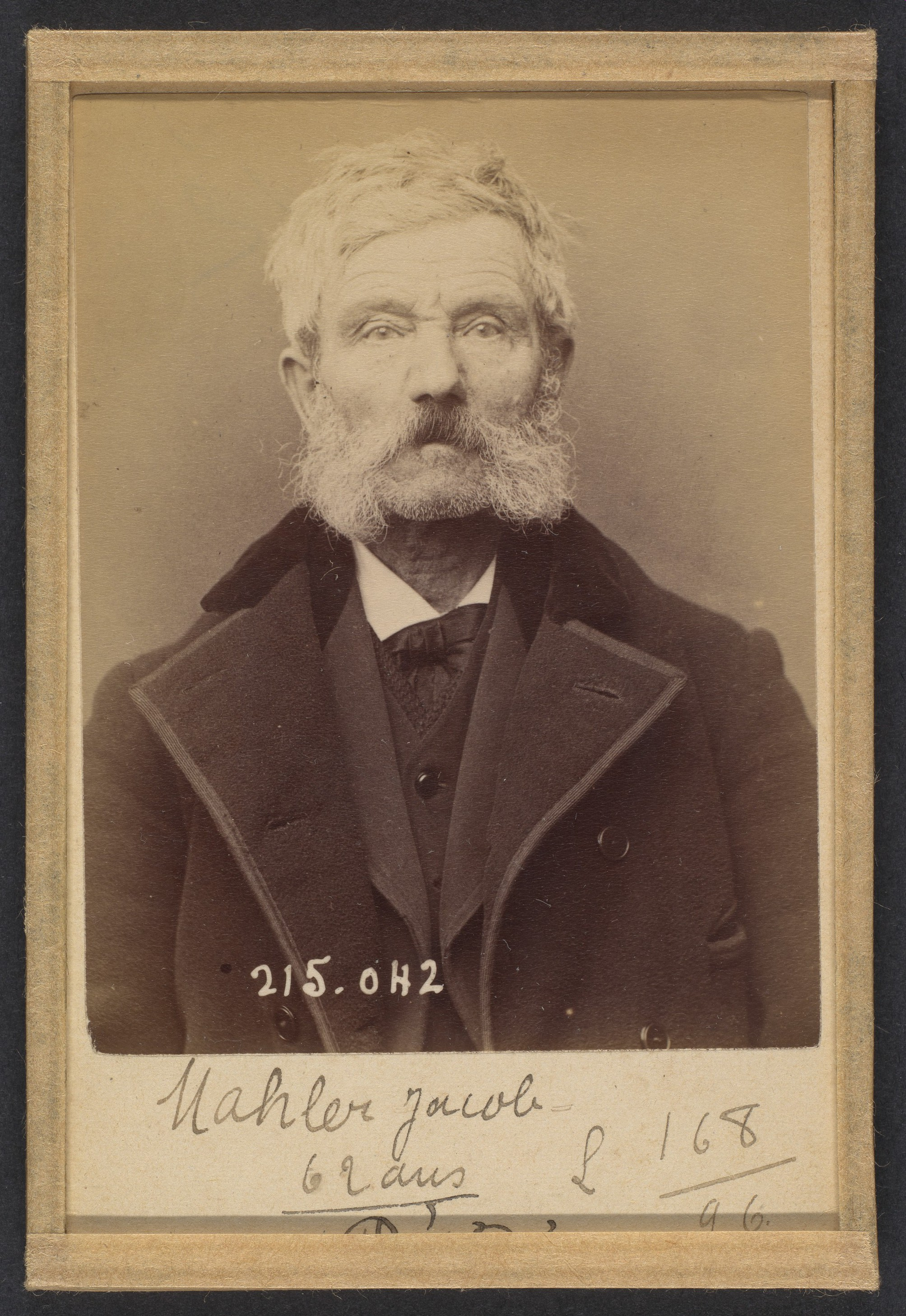
- Jacob Mahler's mugshot, seven days before his death, taken by Alphonse Bertillon (Anthropometric File of Anarchists - 1894)
- Born: July 31, 1832; Hanau, Prussia
- Died: March 10, 1894
- Citizenship: France, Germany
- Occupation: saddler
- Movement: Anarchism

Jacob Mahler (31 July 1832–10 March 1894) was a German-French saddler and anarchist.

After a childhood spent moving between Germany, the Russian Empire, and France, he settled in the latter to work as a saddler when he was eighteen. He became a naturalized French citizen in the following years, married, and joined the anarchist movement in France. Mahler was noted as a militant anarchist by the authorities, who arrested him and discovered a large number of anarchist newspapers and pamphlets in his home.

He died in prison a few days later, by suicide according to the police. This police version has been questioned by more recent historians, who point out the fact that this supposed suicide took place in prison the day after the court ordered his release, which would be especially strange.

His police mugshot is part of the collections of the Metropolitan Museum of Art (MET).

== Biography ==
Jacob Jean Henri Mahler was born in Hanau, Prussia, on 31 July 1832. He left the country when he was just five years old to settle in Saint Petersburg, in the Russian Empire, then moved to France at the age of eighteen. He was employed as a saddler. In 1861, Mahler married the clothing worker Marie Louise Wiedmann in Paris and was naturalized as a French citizen in 1880.

From at least the 1890s, Mahler was noticed by the French authorities as an active and militant anarchist with no children.

On 3 March 1894, as part of the repression affecting the anarchist movement, his home was raided and he was arrested. The police discovered a large number of anarchist newspapers and pamphlets at his home. Transferred to Mazas Prison, he allegedly committed suicide in prison a week later by hanging himself from the end of his bed.

== Legacy ==
=== Doubtful suicide ===
According to historians of the anarchist movement, Rolf Dupuy and Dominique Petit, the circumstances of Mahler's death need to be clarified. The press at the time gave several versions, including one that claimed Mahler was not actually an anarchist. However, the discovery of the release order for Mahler in the police archives, where he was to be freed on 9 March, the day before his suicide in prison, raises questions about the conditions of his death and this 'suicide'. The Paris Police Prefecture never provided an explanation for the affair.

=== Police mugshot ===
His police mugshot is part of the collections of the Metropolitan Museum of Art (MET).

== Bibliography ==
- Petit, Dominique; Dupuy, Rolf (2024), MAHLER Jacob, Henri, Jean, Paris: Le Maitron
- Dupuy, Rolf (2025), "MAHLER Jacob, Henri, Jean", Dictionnaire international des militants anarchistes, Paris
