= Max Gordon (anarchist) =

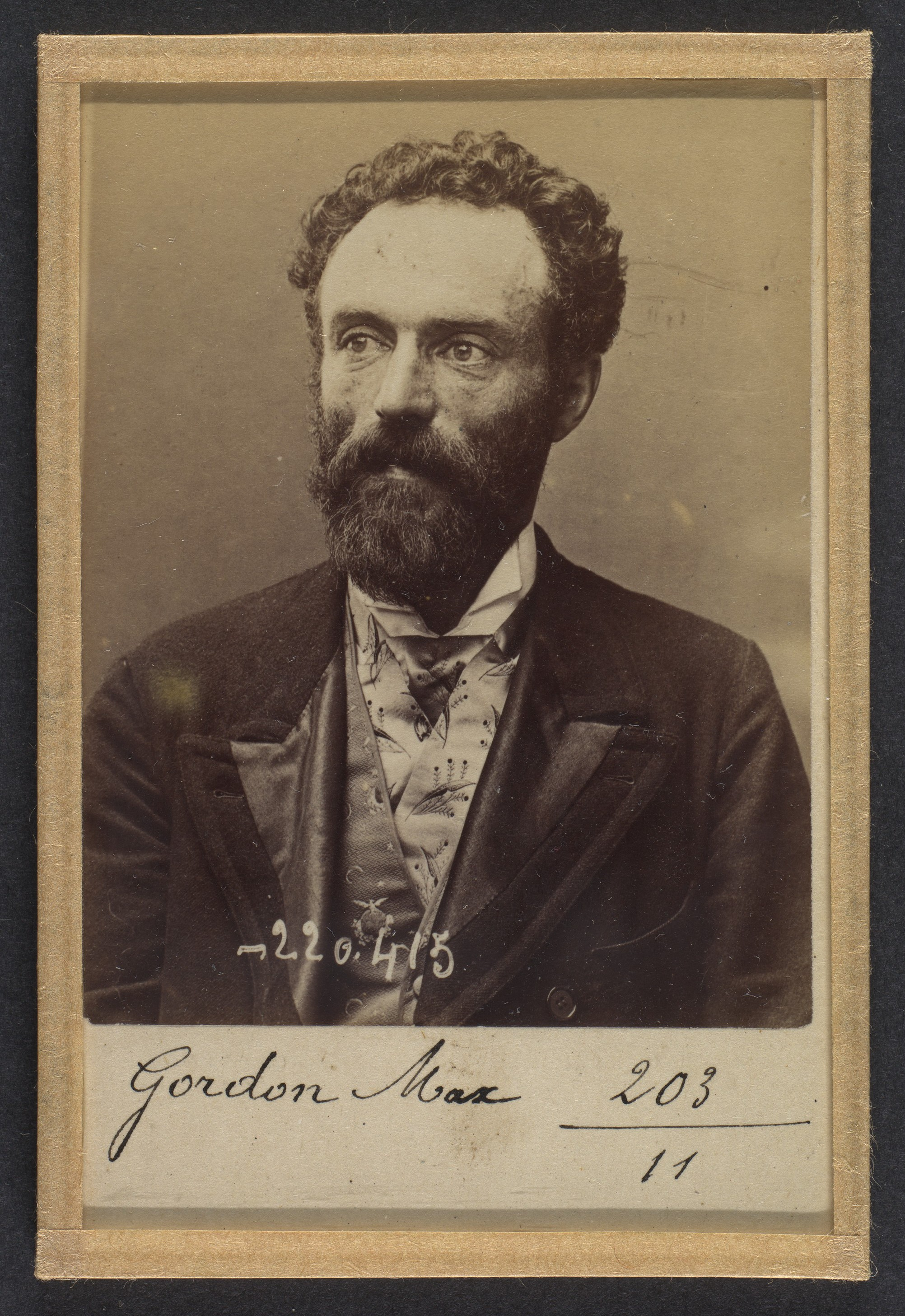
- Max Gordon's mugshot, taken by Alphonse Bertillon in 1894
- Born: August 20, 1854; Vilnius, Russian Empire
- Died: unknown
- Occupations: usher, anarchist, nihilist
- Movement: Anarchism
- Spouse: Rachel Palehoye (m. 1890)
- Children: several, including 2 sons: David and Alexandre, 1 daughter: Eva

Max Gordon, born on 20 August 1854 in Vilnius, and dead on an unknown date, was a Lithuanian Jewish usher, nihilist and anarchist. He began his political activism in the 1880s and was deported for five years to a Siberian labor camp for his revolutionary activities. Later, as his children integrated into the nihilist movement, he and his family moved to Paris, where he became part of the anarchist movement. He was arrested with a large number of anarchist pamphlets and propaganda materials in his possession, but the charges against him were ultimately dropped.

His police mugshot is part of the collections of the Metropolitan Museum of Art (MET).

== Biography ==
Max Gordon was born into a Lithuanian Jewish family in Vilnius on 20 August 1854. In the late 1870s, he lived for two years in Germany.

In 1885, Gordon was sentenced to five years of deportation to a labor camp in Siberia for revolutionary activities. He had several children, including Eva Gordon, who was in a relationship with Kazintcheff, a nihilist involved in a bomb attack, and a son, David Israël, who became president of the Circle of Russian Israelite Workers and was associated with other nihilists.

He married Rachel Palehoye in 1890, and in 1892, the Gordon family—the father, his wife, David, and their nine-year-old son, Alexandre Gordon—moved to Paris. He was the only one who spoke French and was hired as an usher to support the family. They were quickly flagged for participating in anarchist activities in France.

On 1 July 1894, at 4:30 A.M., his home was raided by police who were looking for his son, David. They did not find their target, but surprised Gordon in his underwear and proceeded to raid the house. At his home, the police found a large number of anarchist pamphlets, newspapers, and texts, particularly about Ravachol and the National Assembly bombing, as well as anarchist literature in Russian and Yiddish. They also found the phrase 'Carnot is dead' written down, which the anarchist defended by claiming his young son was the author.

During his interrogation, he claimed to be a pacifist and to subscribe to the vision of Leo Tolstoy. He explained that so many anarchist texts were in his home because he was particularly interested in the social question, and anarchism was one of its expressions. Gordon admitted to speaking several languages, including Russian, French, and Yiddish, but stated that his English was quite poor. Initially prosecuted for criminal association, he was ultimately released.

== Legacy ==
=== Police mugshot ===
His police mugshot is part of the collections of the Metropolitan Museum of Art (MET).

== Bibliography ==
- Petit, Dominique; Dupuy, Rolf (2024), Gordon Max, Paris: Le Maitron
- Dupuy, Rolf (2025), "GORDON, Max", Dictionnaire international des militants anarchistes, Paris
