= Henri Cler =

French anarchist and syndicalist (1862–1910)

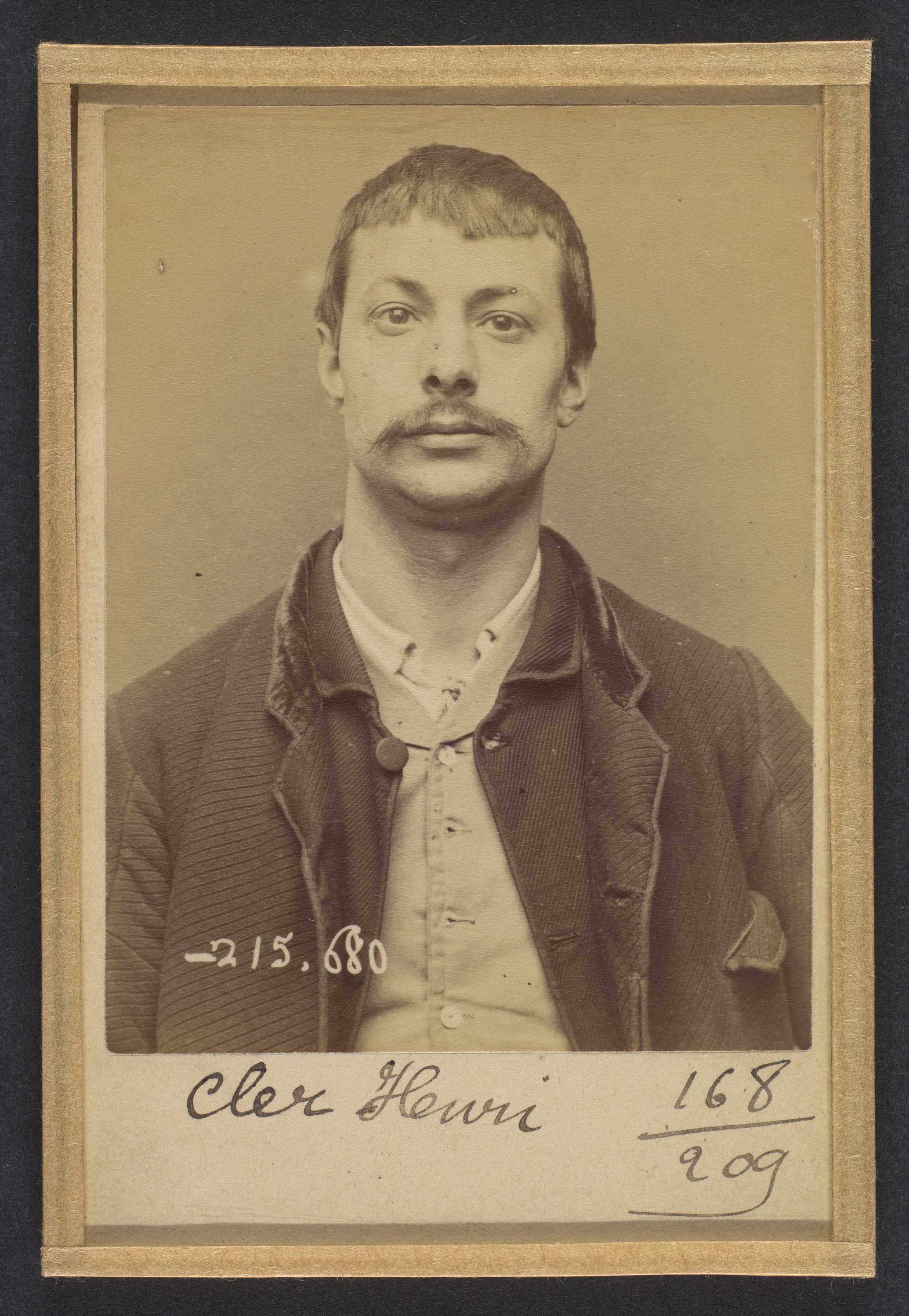
- Henri Cler's mugshot by Alphonse Bertillon (1894)
- Born: 21 September 1862; Paris
- Died: 21 June 1910 (aged 49); Paris
- Cause of death: Police killing
- Occupations: cabinetmaker, anarchist, syndicalist
- Movement: Anarchism

Henri Cler, nicknamed "Biffin", (1862-1910), was a French cabinetmaker, anarchist and syndicalist.

A figure in the anarchist movement in France from the 1890s, he participated in the organization of several anarchist initiatives, for example, hosting Le Père Peinard in premises he rented or sheltering Théodule Meunier at his home during his flight after several bombings. In parallel, Cler was active within the cabinetmaking circles of the capital, and became manager of Le Pot à Colle, the press organ for Parisian cabinetmakers.

In 1910, while assisting a strike, he was severely beaten by a police officer and died a few days later from his injuries. During his funeral, attended by tens of thousands of workers, the crowd clashed very violently with the police, who charged the populace with cavalry and sabres. In total, forty police officers were injured that day—some stabbed—and about a hundred demonstrators were wounded by the sabre charges alone.

== Biography ==
Henri Cler was born on 21 September 1862 in the Faubourg Saint-Antoine into a family of Belgian origin. According to his birth certificate, he was the son of Madeleine Decker, a day laborer, and Michel Cler, a cabinetmaker. Cler also worked as a cabinetmaker in the faubourg and married Rose Françoise Buchfinck, a waistcoat maker, with whom he had two children.

From 1887, he was known as a reader of the anarchist press and participant in anarchist meetings. He was an abstentionist anarchist candidate in the legislative elections of September 1889, and received no votes. In 1891, Cler rented a workshop in his name for anarchist companions to work there communally.

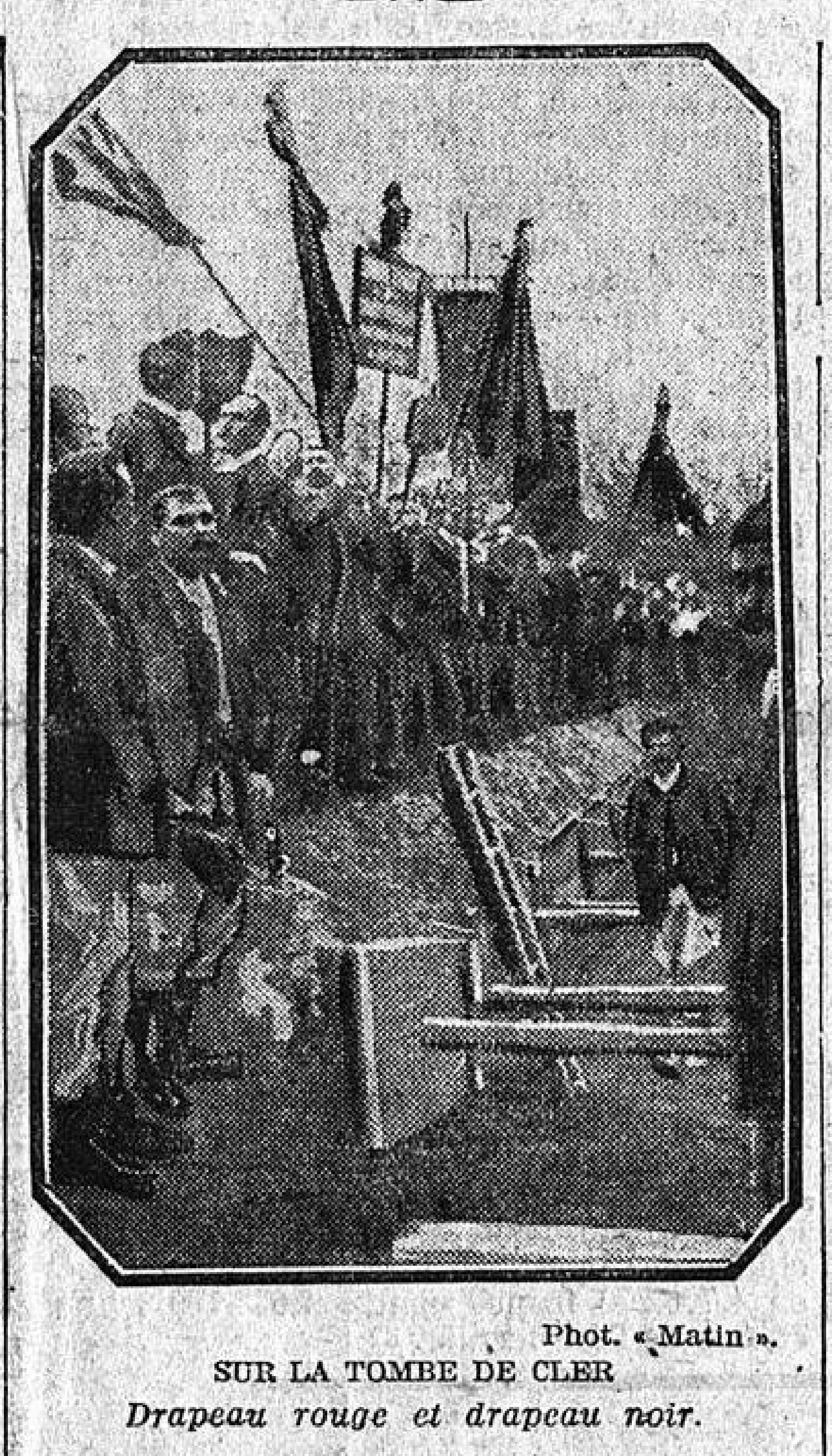
Henri Cler's funerals in Le Matin (27 June 1910) - here with a black and a red flag above his tomb

Le Père Peinard settled for a time in these premises, Rue Triton, but a lack of funding made the project difficult and the group did a "déménagement à la cloche de bois", meaning they left without paying the landlord, a practice Cler engaged in many times in his life. During this move, the concierge was "somewhat mistreated", according to historian Anne Steiner, and she filed a complaint against the anarchist.

In 1893, Cler was noted by the police as participating in numerous meetings and suspected of illegalist activities. Authorities also suspected him of having sheltered Théodule Meunier during his escape, an anarchist from the Pieds plats group, responsible for the Lobau bombing and the Véry bombing.

In April, as part of the 1894 crackdowns affecting the anarchist movement, Cler was arrested by authorities, who relied on the first two lois scélérates ('villainous laws'). He was released a month later, then arrested again in July, and finally obtained a dismissal of charges on 14 June 1895. In 1897, the anarchist was sentenced to two weeks in prison for having "shoved his concierge" during one of his "déménagements à la cloche de bois".

The following year, Cler became manager of Le Pot à Colle, the press organ for furniture workers. In 1899, Cler was sentenced to three months in prison for insults and defamation against his former boss, then again to three months the following year for the same charges, but this time as manager of Le Pot à Colle.

From 1907, he was removed from the list of anarchists to be monitored by the French authorities – but remained active within the workers' movement and among Parisian cabinetmakers, carrying out union propaganda. When a strike broke out among cabinetmaking employers Sanyas and Popot in May 1910 to demand the dismissal of a widely disliked foreman, Cler went daily to support the strikers after his work.

On 13 June 1910, while he was with the strikers, clashes broke out between them and the police. He was fatally struck in the head by very violent blows delivered by a municipal guard with the butt of his revolver. Cler was recovered by his appreciative boss, who took him home for his wife to treat him, without success – the two then sent him to Saint Antoine Hospital. He was bandaged but not treated, and was told to return the next day, which he did. In the following days, his condition only worsened, and, finally hospitalized, he died from his injuries on 21 June 1910.

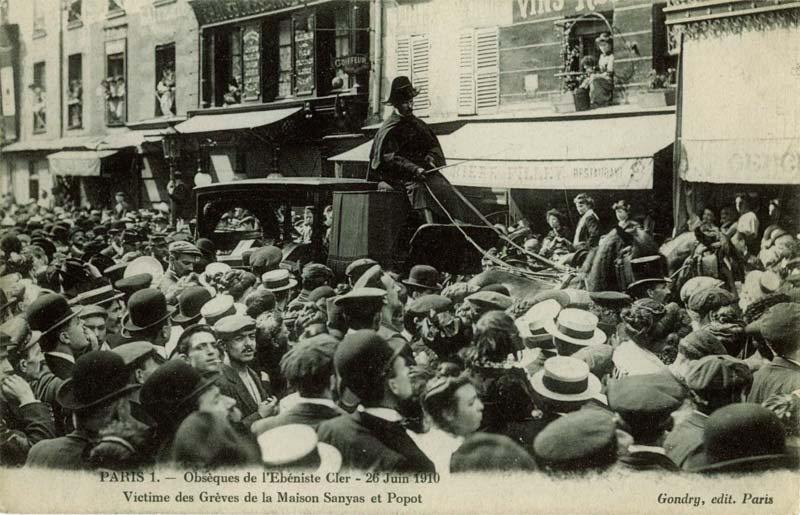
Carriage carrying Henri Cler's body during his funerals (FICEDL collections)

=== Riots of 26 June 1910 ===
Cler's death at the hands of the police caused an immediate shock in the faubourg, whose walls became covered with posters speaking of "employer and police assassination", and all Parisian trade union sections called for participation in his funeral, scheduled for 26 June 1910. The workers' parties were opposed to such participation as they feared "outbreaks", but they were not listened to.

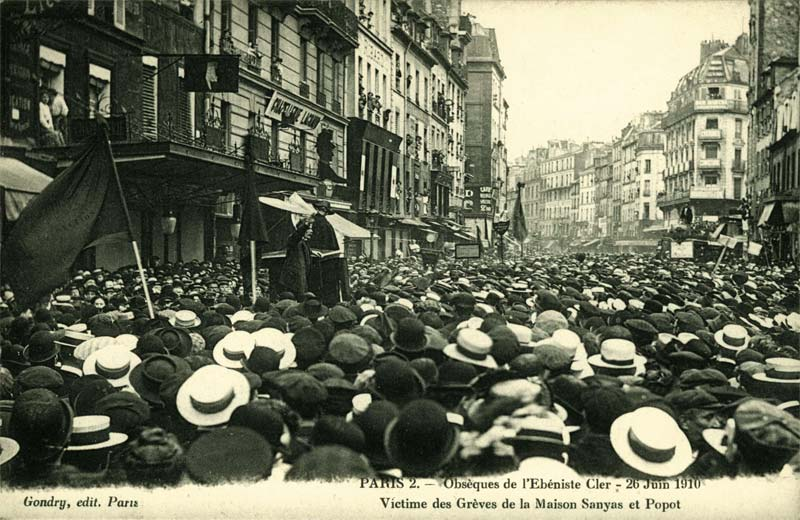
Black and red flags during Cler's funeral (FICEDL collections)

On the day itself, a procession of several tens of thousands of people accompanied his body from his former workplace, at 127 rue du Faubourg Saint-Antoine, to the Pantin cemetery. The gathering quickly became very insurrectionary; the crowd fought with the police, police stations along the route were pelted with stones, and non-strikers and those who refused to uncover their heads before the body were attacked. Several police officers were injured, and one of them was even stabbed. The most violent clashes took place in front of the cemetery, where the police carried out cavalry charges into the crowd with their sabres. In total, over forty police officers were injured, and about a hundred demonstrators received sabre cuts; the pavement was left covered in blood. According to some police witnesses and residents of Pantin, these were the most violent riots in Paris since the Paris Commune, forty years earlier.

== Legacy ==
=== Analysis ===
According to Steiner, who used the riots and his figure as an important point in her monograph dedicated to Parisian riots of this period, it is indicative of the evolution of demonstrations in France, which became less violent throughout the 20th century.

=== Police mugshot ===
His police mugshot is part of the collections of the Metropolitan Museum of Art (MET).

== Bibliography ==
- Steiner, Anne (2024), "CLER Henri, dit BIFFIN", Dictionnaire des anarchistes (Le Maitron), Paris: Le Maitron des anarchistes
