= Lobau bombing =

1892 anarchist bombing in Paris, France

- Part of Ère des attentats
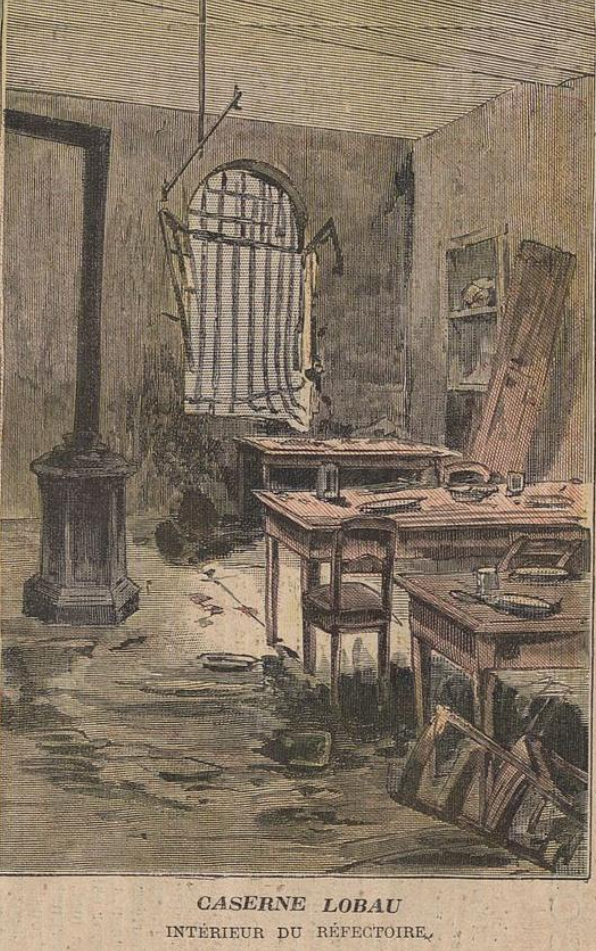
- Representation of the Lobau bombing aftermath (dining room of the barracks) in Le Petit Journal (16 April 1892)
- Location: 48°51′19″N 2°21′13″E; Paris, France
- Date: 15 March 1892
- Attack type: bombing
- Deaths: 0
- Injuries: 0
- Perpetrator: Théodule Meunier
- No. of participants: 1
- Motive: Anarchism
- Verdict: Guilty (life in penal labor)
- Convicted: 1

The Lobau bombing was a bomb attack in Paris, France, carried out on 15 March 1892, by the anarchist militant Théodule Meunier against the Lobau barracks. Organized four days after the Saint-Germain bombing, it was one of the first attacks of the Ère des attentats (1892–1894). The explosion caused material damage in the surrounding area but killed or injured no one.

Meunier managed to carry out the Véry bombing a month later before fleeing to the United Kingdom. He was subsequently extradited to France, sentenced to life imprisonment with hard labor, and deported to the penal colony of Cayenne, where he died.

This bombing, along with other attacks during the Ère des attentats, marked an early shift in terrorist strategy: instead of targeting specific individuals, it focused on symbolic locations—in this case, the Lobau barracks as a stand-in for a precise human target. This shift became a hallmark of modern terrorism but was poorly understood by contemporaries.

== History ==
=== Context ===
In the 19th century, anarchism emerged and took shape in Europe before spreading. Anarchists advocated a struggle against all forms of domination perceived as unjust including economic domination brought forth by capitalism. They were particularly opposed to the State, seen as the organization that legitimized these dominations through its police, army and propaganda.

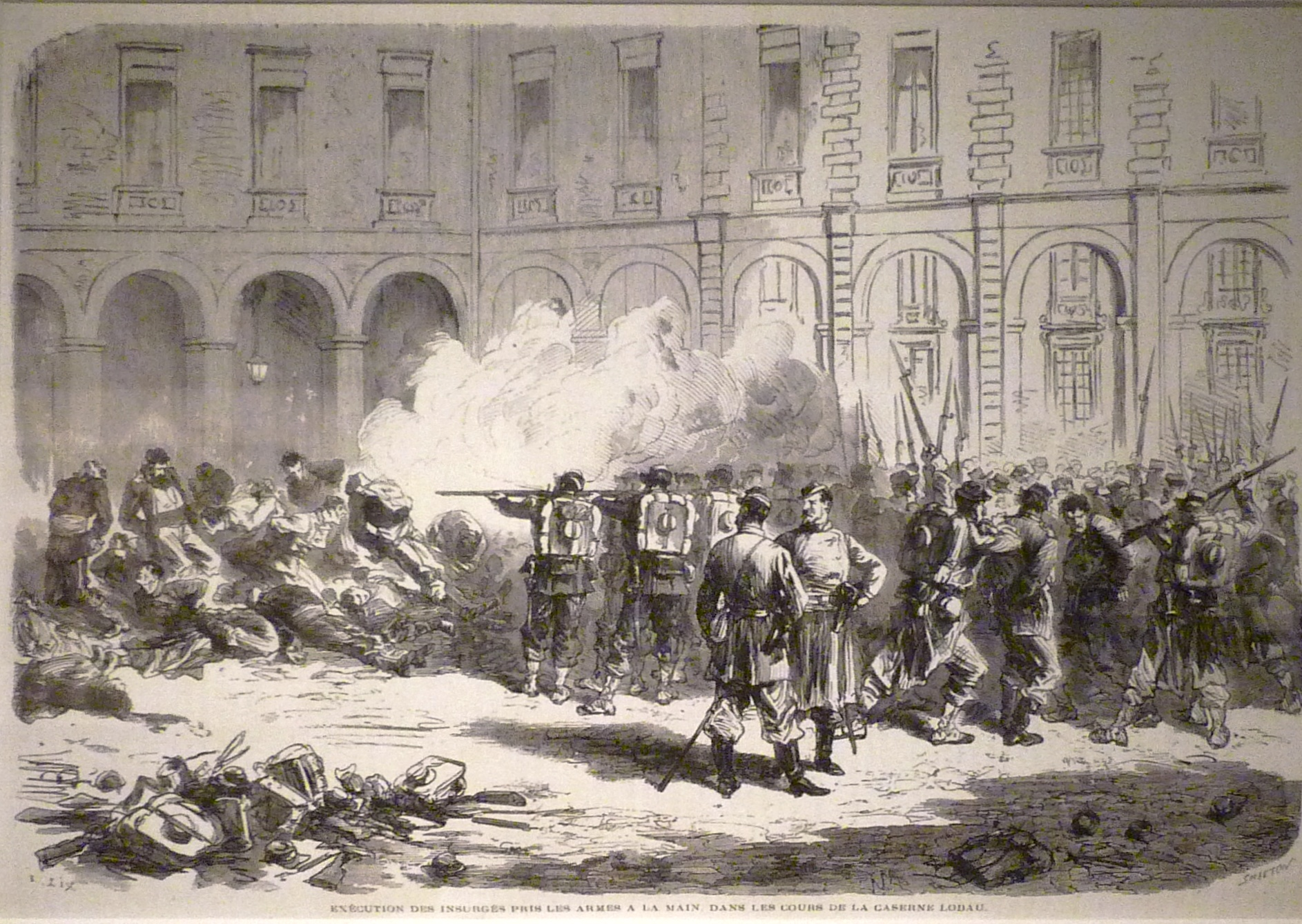
Mass execution of captured Communards in the courtyards of the Lobau barracks - Engraving by Frédéric Lix for L'Illustration on 10 June 1871 - Historical Library of the City of Paris.

In France, the already conflictual relations between anarchists and the French State, embodied by the Third Republic, entered a new period of intense tension: in 1891, the Fourmies shooting, where the army fired on demonstrators demanding an eight‑hour workday, and the Clichy affair, when anarchists were arrested, beaten and mistreated by the police, radicalized a number of anarchists in France. The fact that the anarchists arrested after the Clichy affair were tried with great severity – the prosecutor demanding the death penalty for the three and the judge handing down harsh prison sentences of three and five years – was an important catalyst for the advent of the Ère des attentats.

On 11 March 1892, a group of anarchist militants including Ravachol, Soubère, Jas-Béala, and Charles Simon carried out the Saint-Germain bombing against judge Edmond Benoît, who was presiding over the Clichy affair. It was in this highly tense context that Meunier became active.

The Lobau barracks, where the French Republican Guard was housed, is a site with a striking history. The French state used it during the Semaine sanglante (Bloody Week) (1871) to establish military tribunals targeting the rebels of the Paris Commune. Approximately 2,000 to 3,000 people were summarily executed in the barracks during that week before being buried quickly in the surroundings. This had an impact on anarchists and even unpolitized people, John M. Merriman describing this contextual situation as follows:

From the slaughter of the Communards of Paris during the “Bloody Week” of 21–28 May 1871, to the small massacre at Fourmies in northern France on 1 May 1891, and the mistreatment of three anarchists after the events in Clichy that same year, the violent state response to anarchist violence became entrenched in the collective memory of many ordinary people. Without question, brutal state repression encouraged further attacks in Italy, Spain, and France.

=== Bombing ===
On 15 March 1892, Meunier went to the Lobau barracks on rue de Rivoli. He placed a bomb in front of the building, which housed 800 Republican guards at the time. The bomb exploded, "blowing away" the gate, part of the perimeter wall of the barracks, and shattering the windows of the adjacent Saint-Gervais church. However, it caused no deaths and injured no one. Meunier managed to escape.

=== Aftermath ===
He was not satisfied with the failure of his bombing and expressed his frustration, saying, among other things:

None of those cows/bastards got a scratch!

Some six weeks later, on 25 April 1892, Meunier, along with other members of the anarchist group of the Pieds plats (The Flat Feet), such as Jean-Pierre François, carried out the Véry bombing, targeting the informant who had enabled Ravachol's arrest. He then fled to the United Kingdom and attempted to prevent his extradition to France by arguing that his actions were political in nature, which could have blocked the extradition. However, the British justice system ruled that these would not be political acts, since hostility toward the state was not deemed political. The British police magistrate in charge of his case declared:

I do not seek to establish a rule for determining what might constitute a political offense, but I clearly and emphatically state that hostility toward any government is not a political offense.

Since his attacks were not considered political by the British courts, he was extradited to France, where he was sentenced to life imprisonment with hard labor. He was then sent to the penal colony of Cayenne, where he likely died of malaria in 1907.

The attack is mentioned in a stanza of La Complainte de Ravachol (Ravachol's Lament), which reads:

Original	English Translation
La garde républicaine Habit’ la casern’ Lobau ; Ne voilà-t-il pas qu'un beau Soir l'explosion s'y promène... Mais il n’y eut pas d’bobo : Y a un Dieu pour les cipaux ! [gardes municipaux]	The Republican Guard Lives in the Lobau barracks, Wouldn't you know, one fine Evening, the explosion decided to roam there... But there was no harm done: There's a God for municipal cops!

== Analysis ==
=== Shift in the scope of terrorism ===
The Lobau bombing, like other attacks during the Ère des attentats (1892–1894) marked the emergence of a terrorist symbolism tied to locations rather than individuals. Karine Salomé writes on this subject:

The ambiguity becomes even more pronounced with anarchist attacks, which were no longer exclusively linked to the presence of the head of state. Instead, they began targeting the homes of individuals from diverse backgrounds, such as magistrates Benoît and Bulot during the bombings on Boulevard Saint-Germain and Rue de Clichy in 1892. They also struck symbolic sites, including the Lobau barracks, the Carmaux Mining Company (initially targeted by the bomb that exploded at the Bons Enfants police station), the Madeleine church, the National Assembly, and the Terminus café. From then on, with the exception of Sadi Carnot’s assassination, anarchist attacks signaled a transition from symbolism centered on individuals—specifically the head of state—to symbolism centered on locations, a shift that contemporaries did not always comprehend.

== Bibliography ==
- Accoce, Pierre (1998). "« Ils ont eu Sadi Carnot ! »" [They got Sadi Carnot!]. Ces assassins qui ont voulu changer l'Histoire (in French). Paris: Plon. ISBN 978-2259189873.
- Jourdain, Edouard (2013). L'anarchisme [Anarchism] (in French). Paris: La Découverte. ISBN 978-2-7071-9091-8.
- Merriman, John M. (2016). The dynamite club: how a bombing in fin-de-siècle Paris ignited the age of modern terror. Yale University Press. ISBN 978-0-300-21792-6.
- Piarotas, Mireille (2000). Regards populaires sur la violence [Popular looks at violence] (in French). Saint Etienne (France): Presses Universitaires de Saint-Etienne (PUSE). ISBN 978-2862721804.
- Salomé, Karine (2011), L'Ouragan homicide : L'attentat politique en France au XIXe siècle [The homicidal Hurricane: political assassination in 19th century France] (in French), Paris: Champ Vallon / Epoque, ISBN 978-2-87673-538-5
- Ward, Colin (2004). Anarchism: A Very Short Introduction. Oxford University Press (OUP).
