= Madeleine bombing =

1894 anarchist bombing in Paris, France

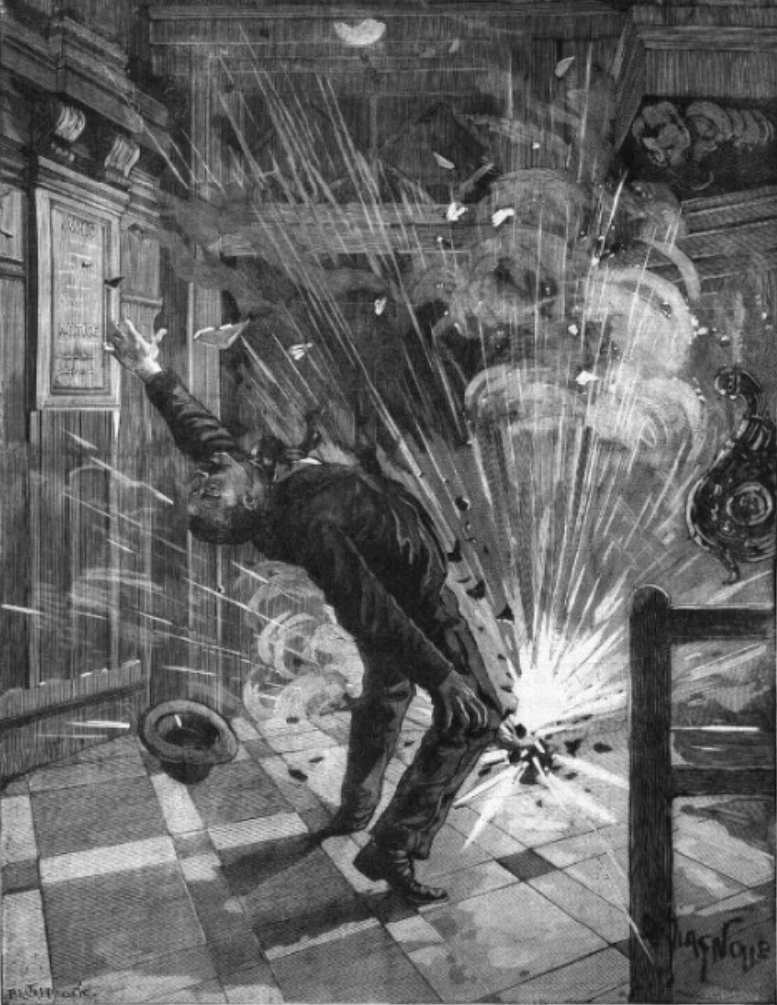
- Depiction of the Madeleine bombing in Le Petit Parisien : supplément illustré (25 March 1894)
- Location: 48°52′11″N 2°19′27″E; Paris
- Date: 15 March 1894
- Attack type: bombing
- Deaths: 1 (the perpetrator)
- Injuries: 0
- Perpetrator: Désiré Pauwels
- Motive: Anarchism; Revenge for Émile Henry being jailed

The Madeleine bombing was a bomb attack carried out on 15 March 1894 by the anarchist militant Désiré Pauwels at the Madeleine church, facing the French National Assembly in Paris. The attack occurred during the latter half of the Era of Attacks (1892–1894) and was intended to portray the church as part of the Parisian bourgeoisie. Pauwels arrived at the church but detonated his bomb prematurely at the entrance before he could position it.

Pauwels died shortly afterward from a gunshot wound to the head, possibly self-inflicted, as he would have attempted suicide to avoid capture by police. No other casualties or injuries were reported, though the church sustained damage and required restoration. This bombing, along with other attacks during the Era of Attacks, marked an early shift in terrorist strategy: instead of targeting specific individuals, it focused on symbolic locations—in this case, the Madeleine church as a stand-in for a precise human target.

The incident also highlighted the growing role of forensic science in criminal investigations. Pauwels' body was so severely disfigured and mutilated by the explosion that it became unrecognizable, necessitating identification by forensic experts—who successfully confirmed his identity.

== History ==
=== Context ===
In the 19th century, anarchism emerged and took shape in Europe before spreading. Anarchists advocated a struggle against all forms of domination perceived as unjust including economic domination brought forth by capitalism. They were particularly opposed to the State, seen as the organization that legitimized these dominations through its police, army and propaganda.

The anarchists became increasingly radicalized in response to various events, particularly the Fourmies massacre, where the army fired on demonstrators, and the Clichy affair, where three anarchists were arrested, beaten with sabres, and deprived of water and medical care for some time before being subjected to a harsh trial. This radicalization led some of them to adopt a confrontational stance with the State through a campaign of terrorist attacks. Following the Saint-Germain bombing and the Clichy bombing (March 1892), their main perpetrator, Ravachol, was executed by the authorities. This situation further radicalized the anarchist militant Émile Henry, who subsequently carried out a series of bombings, including the Carmaux-Bons Enfants bombing (November 1892). After taking refuge in the United Kingdom, Henry returned to Paris at the start of 1894, where he carried out the Café Terminus bombing on 12 February 1894.

Désiré Pauwels was an anarchist militant closely associated with Henry. Already active in anarchist activism since at least 1885, when he founded the group 'Anarchist Youth of Saint-Denis', Pauwels met several other anarchists in the circles he frequented, such as Auguste Vaillant and Sébastien Faure, with whom he later came into conflict. By this time, Pauwels was already making bombs and managed to evade French police surveillance on multiple occasions. After seeking refuge in Luxembourg and subsequently being expelled from the country, he returned to Paris in 1892. By then, Pauwels had gained a reputation for being a violent and 'unbalanced' figure within the anarchist circles he evolved in.

=== Preparations and bombing ===
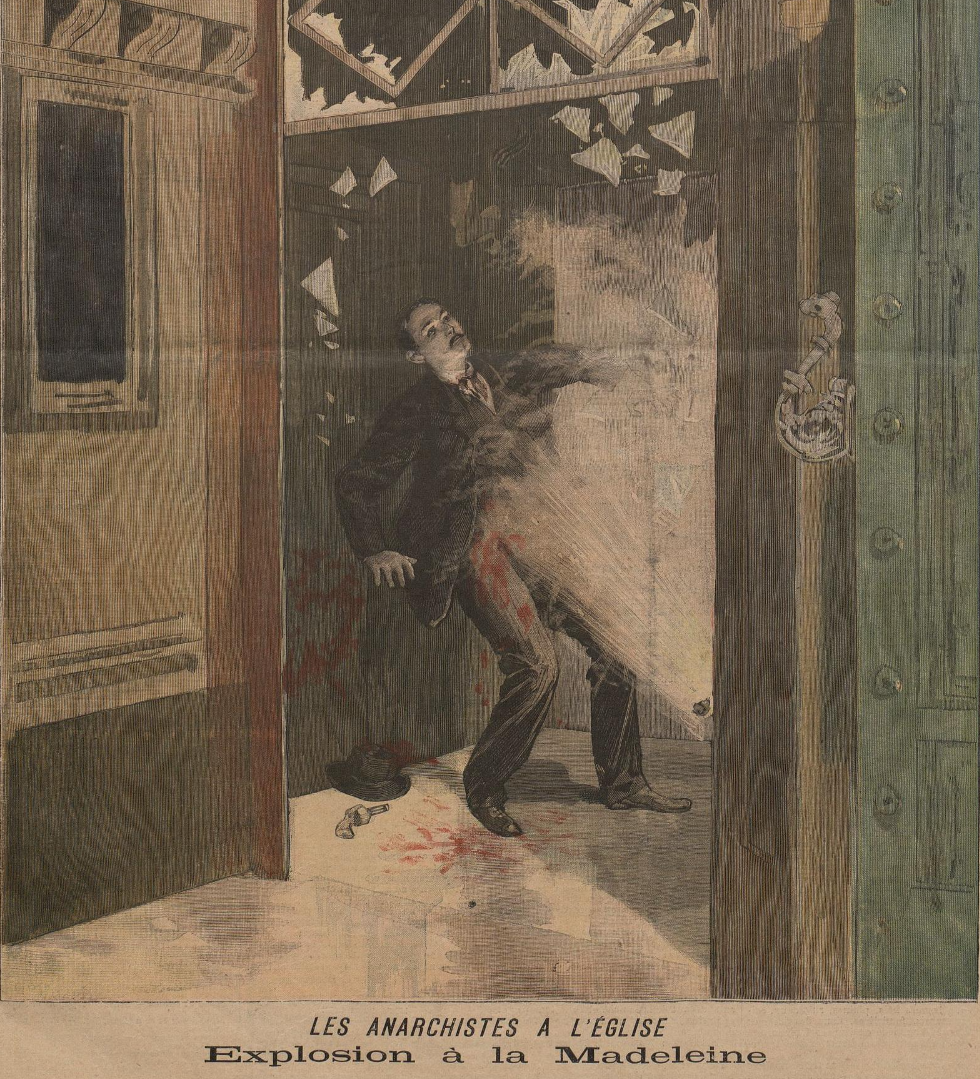
Representation of the Madeleine bombing in Le Petit Journal (26 March 1894)

In early 1894, following the Café Terminus bombing and the arrest of his friend Henry, Pauwels rigged two hotel rooms with explosives and made them detonate as police officers opened the doors. One officer was injured, and the concierge who had opened the door was killed in the blast. These attacks, known as the 20 February bombings, prompted Pauwels to flee and evade police capture.

On Thursday, 15 March 1894, at approximately 2:30 PM, Pauwels arrived at the Madeleine church opposite the French National Assembly. Armed with a loaded pistol, the anarchist carried a bomb that detonated prematurely as he entered the building. The explosion instantly eviscerated him, leaving him disfigured and critically injured. His body was hurled to the ground, with his right hand barely attached to his arm 'by a thread'. He died minutes later from a gunshot wound to the head, possibly self-inflicted to avoid arrest.

=== Aftermath ===
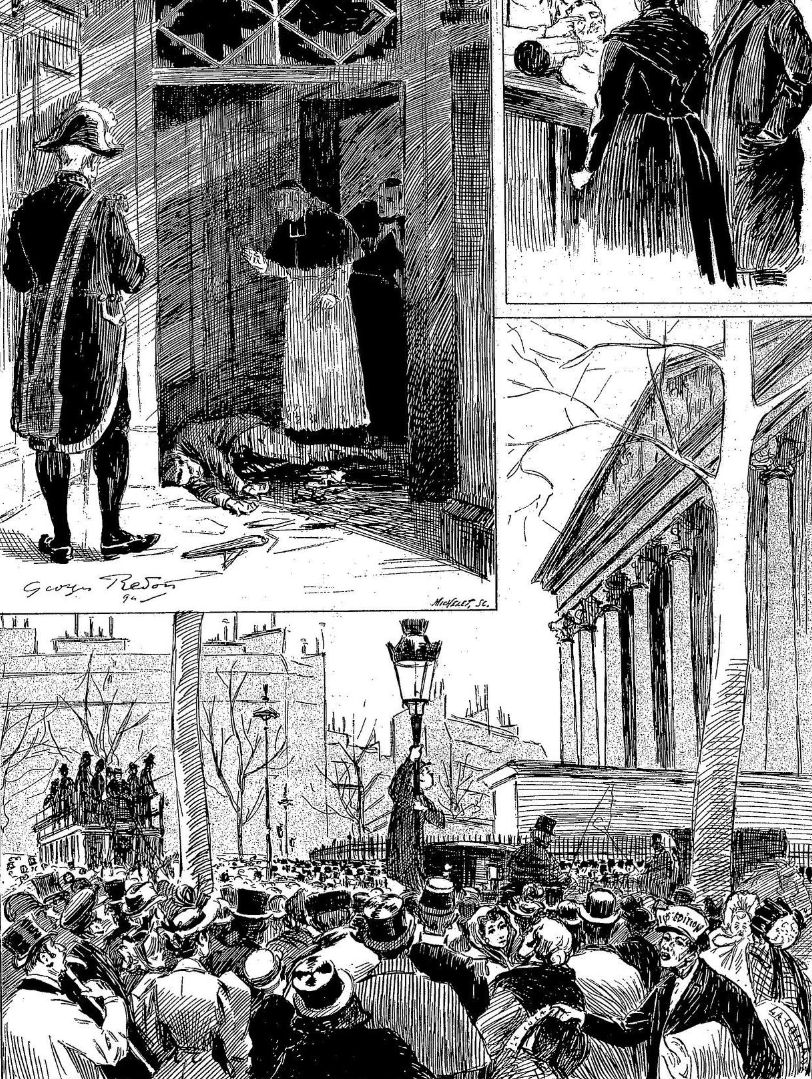
Representation of the Madeleine bombing aftermath in L'Univers illustré (22 March 1894)

Henry, who was imprisoned at the time, initially suspected that Théodule Meunier—still at large after the Véry bombing—was responsible for the attack. He later learned that the victim of the explosion was, in fact, his friend Pauwels. Henry was tried in the weeks following the bombing and sentenced to death.

Since Pauwels’ body was unrecognizable due to the explosion, forensic investigators meticulously examined the scene to identify him. Police combed through the debris, recovered fragments of explosives, and cross-referenced evidence with Bertillon's new photographic criminal identification system. These efforts allowed authorities to confirm the bomber's identity as Pauwels. His stepfather was later summoned to formally identify the body, which he did, but refused to claim it for burial.

Karine Salomé describes the reception of the attack in the French press as follows:

In the case of anarchists, however, contempt and disgust prevailed. When the perpetrator of the Madeleine bombing, Pauwels, died in the explosion of his own bomb in 1894, his act was neither seen as a sign of exceptional determination nor as evidence of any courage. On the contrary, the press mocked the risks taken by those who carried out bombings.

== Bibliography ==
- Jourdain, Edouard (2013). L'anarchisme [Anarchism]. Paris: La Découverte. ISBN 978-2-7071-9091-8.
- Merriman, John M. (2016). The dynamite club: how a bombing in fin-de-siècle Paris ignited the age of modern terror. Yale University Press. ISBN 978-0-300-21792-6.
- Salomé, Karine (2011), L'Ouragan homicide : L'attentat politique en France au XIXe siècle [The homicidal Hurricane: political assassination in 19th century France], Paris: Champ Vallon / Epoque, ISBN 978-2-87673-538-5
- Ward, Colin (2004). Anarchism: A Very Short Introduction. Oxford University Press (OUP).
