= Pieds plats =

Historical anarchist group

- Dates active: 1880s-1890s
- Active regions: France
- Ideology: Anarchism; Individualist anarchism; Illegalism
- Political position: Far-left
- Status: Defunct

The Pieds plats (English: Flat feet) were an individualist and illegalist anarchist group founded in the 1880s in Paris. Bringing together workers from the Île-de-France region in the carpentry trade, some of its members participated in the Ère des attentats (1892–1894), such as Théodule Meunier, Jean-Pierre François, and Fernand Bricout, who carried out the Véry bombing or the Lobau bombing in the first half of 1892. Through their extensive use of propaganda by the deed during this period, they positioned themselves as counter-powers to the authority of prominent anarchist figures like Charles Malato, Errico Malatesta, or Peter Kropotkin, whom the Pieds plats and broader individualist anarchists openly opposed.

The group also gained influence through its combination of direct action, illegalism, and propaganda by the deed. Its members are thus credited with pioneering and theorizing 'déménagements à la cloche de bois' (‘silent move-outs’)—the practice of leaving a residence without notifying the landlord or paying rent. This became one of the ideological foundations for the later practice of squatting.

== History ==
The Pieds plats were founded in the 1880s among carpentry workers in Paris. The group emerged from anarchist circles organized by the anarcho-syndicalist wine merchant Paul Rousseau at his home, located at 131 rue Saint-Martin. Le Maitron lists as members, among others, companions Théodule Meunier, Jean-Pierre François, Fernand Bricout, Bruneau, Sentenac, Cler, and Soulage. Ferter was also linked to the group and participated in fundraising efforts for its activities.

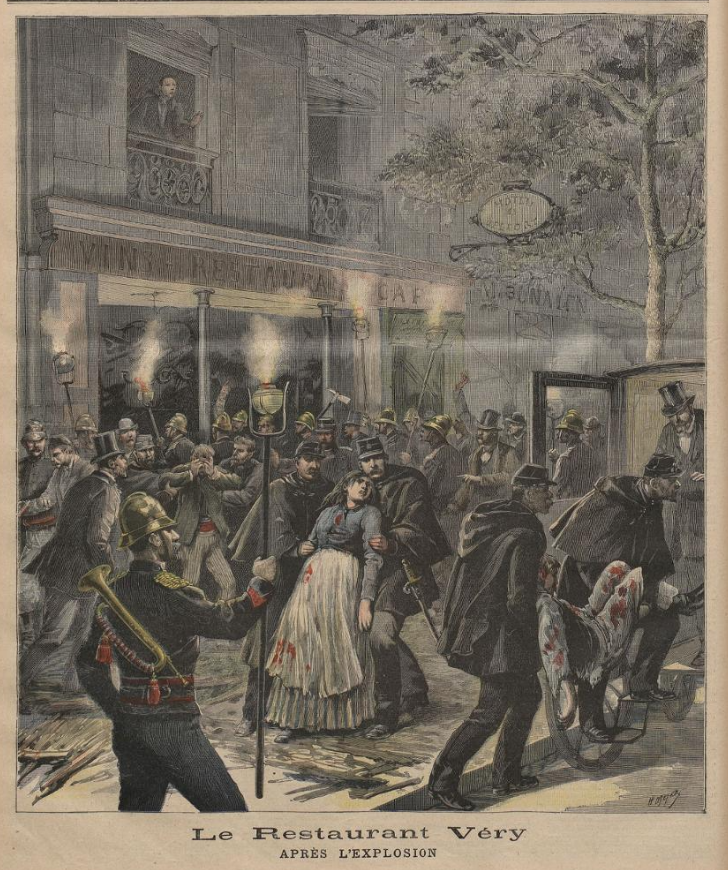
Representation of the Very bombing aftermath in Le Petit Journal

According to their opponent Jean Grave, their name originated from the popular expression ‘Je ne marche pas, j’ai les pieds plats’ (‘I won’t budge/walk; I have flat feet’). Grave described them as primarily engaging in illegalist tactics, such as individual reclamation, notably targeting Parisian wine merchants—either by accumulating debts before disappearing or simply stealing dishes, linens, and drinks from those merchants or restaurant owners. Later, during the Era of Attacks (1892–1894), members like Meunier, François, and Bricout participated in the Véry bombing, one of the first major attacks of the period, which followed the arrest of Ravachol.

Their ideology, blending illegalism, direct action, and propaganda by the deed, played a key role in developing the concept of 'déménagements à la cloche de bois' (‘silent move-outs’)—leaving a residence without notifying the landlord or paying rent. This practice became an early precursor to squatting.

The Pieds plats also engaged in fierce polemics against prominent anarchist figures like Charles Malato, Errico Malatesta, and Peter Kropotkin, whom they derided as ‘[anarchomoralists, cowardly anarchists, personalities, petty popes, doctrinaires, or prelates]’. Conversely, these three anarcho-communist viewed the Pieds plats and individualist anarchists with suspicion, arguing that their circles were infiltrated by police and that their use of violence and propaganda by the deed undermined the broader anarchist cause.

== Bibliography ==
- Bantman, Constance (2007), Anarchismes et anarchistes en France et en Grande-Bretagne, 1880-1914: Échanges, représentations, transferts [Anarchisms and anarchists in France and Great Britain, 1880-1914: Exchanges, representations, transfers], Paris: University Paris XIII (PhD thesis)
- Grave, Jean (1930), Le Mouvement libertaire sous la IIIe République : Souvenirs d'un révolté [The libertarian movement under the Third Republic: Memories of a rebel], Paris: Les œuvres représentatives
- Merriman, John M. (2016). The dynamite club: how a bombing in fin-de-siècle Paris ignited the age of modern terror. Yale University Press. ISBN 978-0-300-21792-6.
- Péchu, Cécile (2010), Les squats [Squats], Contester, Paris: Presses de Sciences Po (PSP), doi:10.3917/scpo.pechu.2010.01, ISBN 978-2-7246-1169-4
