= Jean-Pierre François (anarchist) =

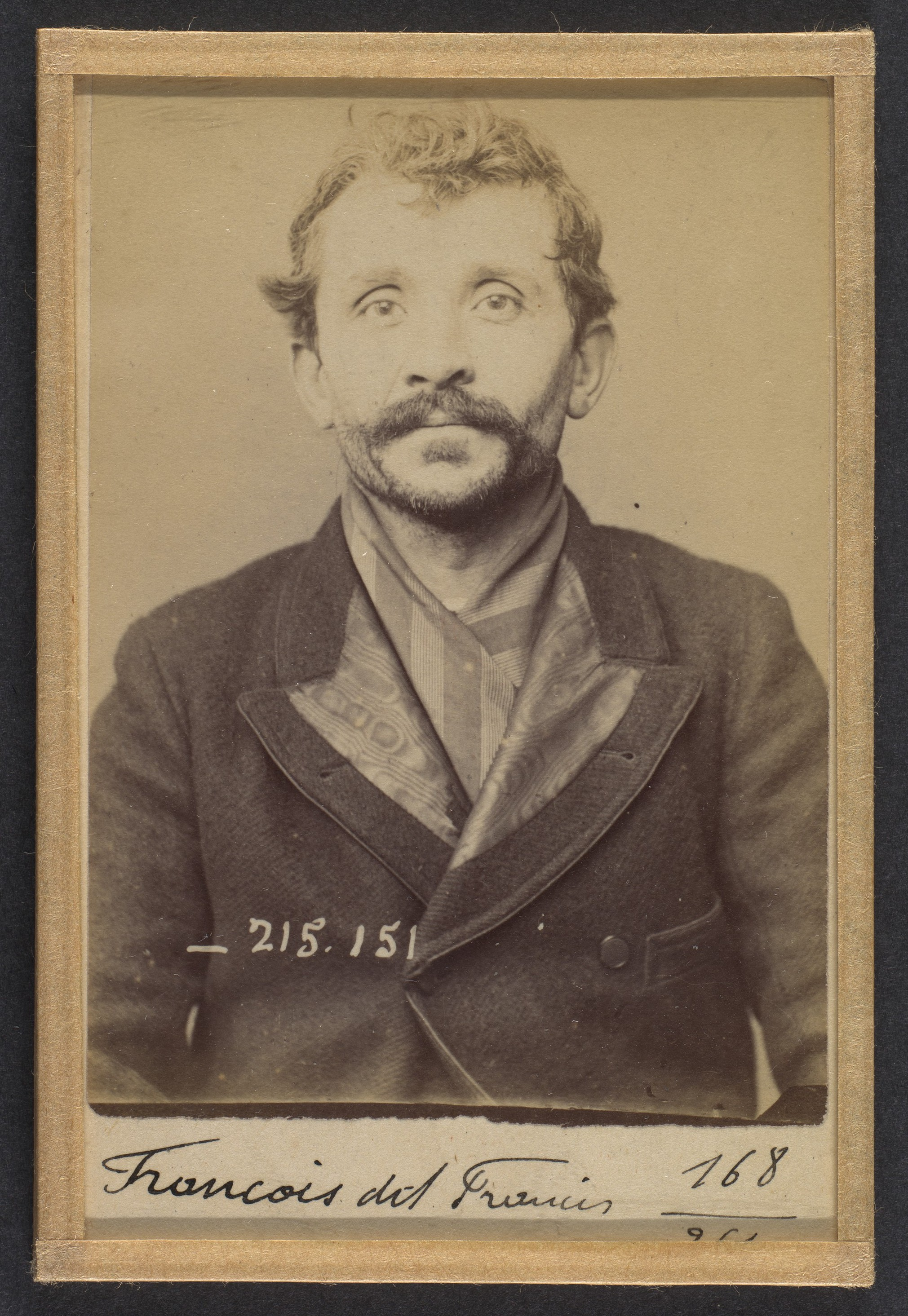
- Police mugshot of Jean-Pierre François by Alphonse Bertillon (1894)
- Born: December 3, 1855; Reims
- Era: Ère des attentats
- Organization: Pieds plats
- Known for: Véry bombing
- Movement: Anarchism

Jean-Pierre François, nicknamed 'Francis', (3 December 1855, in Reims-after 1907) was a carpenter and individualist-illegalist anarchist terrorist. After a youth marked by poverty and repeated criminal convictions, he was sent to a disciplinary battalion in French Algeria, where he was again imprisoned for theft. Upon his return to the métropole, he married the anarchist activist Victorine Delanoy, and together they became involved in Parisian anarchist circles.

Close to figures such as Théodule Meunier and Pierre Martinet—one of the leading theorists of individualist anarchism—François became active in several anarchist movements and groups, including the Pieds plats group. He is best known for his participation during the Ère des attentats (1892–1894). In this context, he took part in the Véry bombing, which targeted its owner, Jean-Marie Véry, an informant for the police and the denouncer of Ravachol. Arrested shortly thereafter, he managed to be freed and fled to London, where he was arrested again. During his detention, Louise Michel or Peter Kropotkin intervened on his behalf for his release. Extradited back to France, he was acquitted in 1893.

After his acquittal, François remained an active participant in the anarchist movement, engaging in actions up until the early twentieth century and being accused of other bombings he may have committed—for instance, a bomb attack against two police officers in 1905. Overall, while he was convicted several times, he systematically escaped any sentence or even conviction in terrorism related cases.

== Biography ==
=== Youth and anarchist trajectory ===
Jean-Pierre François was born on 3 December 1855 in Reims. A carpenter, he left the city in 1872. In the following years, he was frequently convicted for acts of theft or vagrancy. His convictions, in chronological order, include:

- 1 May 1872: 15 days in prison for vagrancy.
- 27 May 1872: 2 months in prison for vagrancy and attempted theft.
- 21 September 1872: 15 months in prison for theft.
- 1 April 1874: 15 months in prison for theft. After appealing, his sentence was increased to two years (24 months).

He was later drafted from prisons to participate in the colonization of Algeria as part of a disciplinary battalion. His stay there was short-lived, as he was sentenced again on 6 April 1878 to five years in prison and military degradation for stealing bread.

After returning to mainland France, he married the anarchist activist Victorine Josephine Delanoy in Pantin in 1886. The couple moved in with Delanoy’s mother and their four children on Rue Beaubourg in 1891. In December of that year, François was fired from his job for anarchist propaganda but soon found employment elsewhere. From 1892 onward, Delanoy and François hosted various anarchists in their home, including Théodule Meunier, the Bricout couple, and Pierre Martinet, a theorist of individualist anarchism. François developed a close friendship with Martinet, who visited him every Sunday with his two dogs, occasionally accompanied by a “young” companion whom François referred to as “Madame Martinet”. Though the Delanoy-François couple attended anarchist meetings during this period, they never spoke publicly.

François, nicknamed “Francis”, was also connected to several anarchist figures in carpentry. Le Maitron lists the following members of his anarchist group, known as Les Pieds Plats (The Flat-Footed): 'Bricou, Meunier, Bruneau, Sentenac, Cler, Soulage'. According to a police report around that time, François spent most of his time drinking and had never killed anyone. Despite him drinking, historian John M. Merriman describes him as a 'powerful' figure within these circles.

On 25 April 1892, the same day as the Véry bombing, the anarchist was described in a police report as follows:

Very closely linked with Martinet [...] [seeks, like him, to] incite young people to commit acts [...] due to his inability to speak in public, he never delivers speeches but instead stirs his comrades in small groups to act individually.

=== The Ère des attentats and the Véry bombing ===
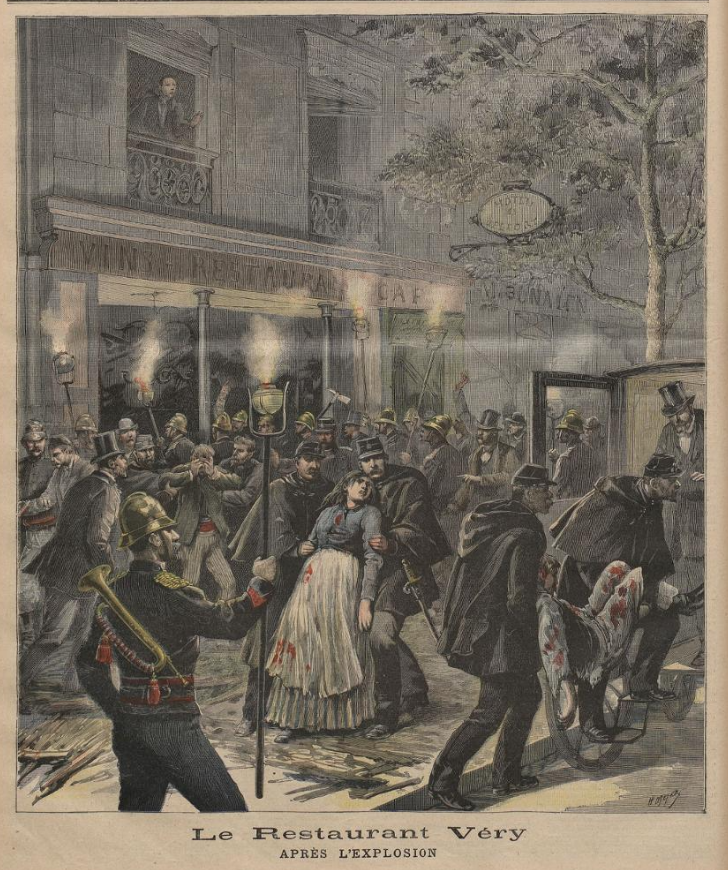
Representation of the Very bombing aftermath in Le Petit Journal

During the Ère des attentats (1892–1894), François was initially investigated by police, who suspected him of involvement in the Lobau bombing. However, no incriminating evidence was found at his home, and he remained free.

On 30 March 1892, Ravachol—a fugitive anarchist hiding at the Véry restaurant on Boulevard Magenta—was recognized by an employee, Jules Lhérot, who alerted the café’s owner, the very Jean Marie Véry. Véry then informed the police, leading to Ravachol’s arrest. Authorities heightened security around the restaurant, fearing retaliation. François openly condemned Lhérot and Véry’s collaboration with the police. At a meeting of the International Anarchist Circle on 10 April 1892, he declared:

Lhérot will not enjoy the money he received [for the betrayal]—I swear it.

He subsequently vanished from his home and relocated. On 25 April 1892, the eve of Ravachol’s trial, François and Théodule Meunier planted a bomb—built by Bricout and Meunier—in a suitcase left at the Véry restaurant. The explosion killed Véry and another person. In response to the attack, the anarchist newspaper Le Père Peinard published an harsh pun targeting the slain owner:

Verification.

=== Legal proceedings and arrest ===
On 27 April 1892, François was arrested at the Africain bar on 6 Boulevard de Sébastopol alongside another militant named Lapeyre. The two spotted the approaching police and attempted to flee but were caught after a struggle, aided by a growing crowd that rallied to their defense. During their transfer to the police station in a carriage, they shouted, 'Long live anarchy!' Both denied involvement in the Véry bombing and refused to answer police questions. François managed to provide an alibi, claiming he was at Lejeune’s residence, supported by a dozen witnesses, and was released on 8 May 1892. However, Bricout later denounced François to the police, accusing him of aiding Meunier in planning the bombing. François defended himself in an article published in L’Éclair, proclaiming his innocence. Unconvinced of receiving fair treatment, he fled to the United Kingdom to evade French authorities.

Delanoy joined him in London on 20 June 1892. The couple adopted the alias 'Johnson' and were sheltered by fellow anarchists, including Fritz Brall, who was later arrested in 1894 by British police for manufacturing explosives. On 13 October 1892, François was apprehended on Pitt Street while carrying Brall’s identity papers and manuals on bomb-making. He defiantly told the arresting officers:

You’re lucky you didn’t find me at home, where I would have sold my life as dearly as possible, down to the last drop of my blood.

When police raided his home, Delanoy—pregnant at the time—attempted to seize a revolver and fire on the officers before being subdued and arrested.

=== Extradition and Louise Michel ===
On 27 November 1892, London-based anarchists gathered at Trafalgar Square to demand François’s release and oppose his extradition to France. The protest was partly organized by Louise Michel, who was arrested by police before she could address the crowd. After her release, Michel actively campaigned to support François, securing him a lawyer and co-founding the 'Committee for the Defense of the Right to Asylum', an organization dedicated to blocking his extradition. The committee, led by president Agnès Henry was also supported by prominent figures like the Rossetti family and major anarchist thinker Peter Kropotkin.

Michel’s decision to support François drew criticism from some revolutionaries. Olive Garnett (a close associate of the Rossetti family) recounts Sergey Stepniak-Kravchinsky, a Russian revolutionary, remarking :

Speaking of Louise Michel, he acknowledged she was a remarkable personality, an idealistic woman—but mad, completely misguided. He recounted noble actions she had undertaken and declared them sad proof of humanity’s tendency to err while striving to do good.

Despite these efforts, François was extradited to France on 1 December 1892. Upon learning of his deportation, Michel was “devastated” and exclaimed:

This can’t be happening! […] There could be more extraditions.

François stood trial at the Cour d’assises de la Seine and was acquitted on 12 April 1893. In contrast, Bricout—who had betrayed him to authorities—was sentenced to 20 years of labor.

=== Resumption of activism ===
Upon his release, the anarchist resumed his militant activities. He actively participated in the 1893 anarchist riots in Paris. In May 1893, François was sentenced to 28 days in prison but arrived at the jail six days late, leading authorities to add five days to his sentence. In July 1893, he became involved again with the International Anarchist Circle, clashing with Georges Brunet—an upcoming defendant in the Trial of the Thirty—whom he accused of being a 'chatterbox and jester'. During this period, he threatened to go to the Labour Exchange and open fire on anyone who tried to stop him from speaking.

In February 1894, Delanoy, François, and their son attended an anarchist meeting at the Temple Hall. According to police, days later, he visited the grave of Auguste Vaillant—executed on 5 February 1894—and made his son swear: ‘Vaillant, you will be avenged!’ over the tomb. After his arrest, he denied these accusations. He was searched again on 26 February 1894, but no incriminating evidence was found.

On 5 March 1894, police arrested François at his home. He refused to open the door, insulted the police commissaire, and declared:

Shit, I’m not a concierge.

Officers were forced to call a locksmith and break down two doors to arrest him. As they seized him, he struggled violently and shouted:

You’re acting like burglars! You’ll only take me away in pieces. I’ve been harassed long enough. Vaillant will be avenged! And so will I, if necessary!

He was sentenced to three months in prison on 24 April 1894 for insulting the police commissaire. During his incarceration, his home was raided again, and Delanoy was evicted. When she visited him in prison, he passed her a letter, sparking a clash with guards.

In July 1896, the couple discreetly relocated and clashed with their building’s concierge, giving him a few ‘shoves’. His wife, however, reported them to the police. François was arrested for attempting to leave his residence without permission—after being beaten by officers—while Delanoy and an anarchist comrade, Lefèvre, were also detained. François received a two-month sentence, and Delanoy eight days.

On 1 February 1905, during a socialist rally against the Tsar, a bomb was thrown at police in the Tivoli-Vauxhall bombing, injuring two Republican Guards. François, seated at a nearby café terrace, was arrested but later cleared of charges.

On 20 January 1907, he was arrested during a protest for weekly rest days after allegedly insulting a corporal at Place de la République. He was acquitted.

== Bibliography ==
- Baylac, Marie-Hélène (2024), Louise Michel, Paris: Perrin, ISBN 978-2262097714
- Merriman, John M. (2016). The dynamite club: how a bombing in fin-de-siècle Paris ignited the age of modern terror. Yale University Press. ISBN 978-0-300-21792-6.
