= Théodule Meunier =

French anarchist (1860–1907)

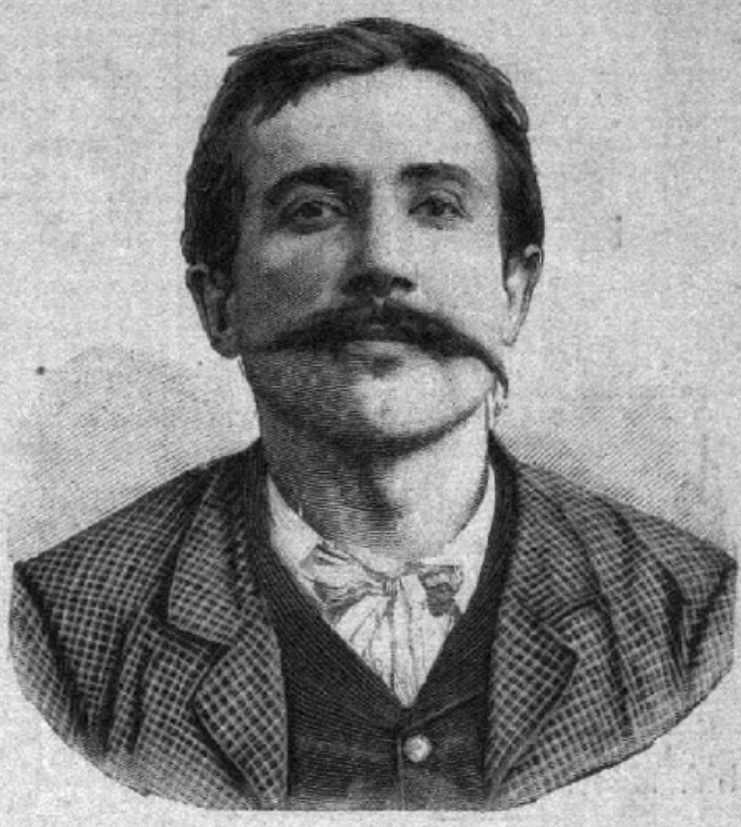
- Depiction of Théodule Meunier in Le Petit Parisien : supplément illustré (10 July 1892)
- Born: August 22, 1860; Bournezeau
- Died: 25 July 1907 (aged 47); Cayenne
- Era: Ère des attentats
- Organization: Pieds plats
- Known for: Lobau bombing Véry bombing
- Movement: Anarchism

Théodule Meunier (August 22, 1860 in Bournezeau, France – July 25, 1907 in Cayenne, French Guiana) was a French anarchist who, along with Emile Henry and Auguste Vaillant, was responsible for a series of bombings in Paris, France during early 1892. The three specifically targeted both civilian and government buildings which included boulevard cafes, the homes of magistrates, police stations and the Chamber of Deputies.

== Biography ==
A cabinet maker by trade, Meunier had joined the French anarchist movement during the early 1890s. According to Charles Malato, it was said of Meunier that he was "...the most remarkable type of revolutionary illuminist, an ascetic and a visionary, as passionate for the search for the ideal society as Saint-Just, and as merciless as seeking his way towards it."

During the trial of the notorious anarchist known as Ravachol, Meunier set off a bomb at the Lobau Barracks, the site of the Communard massacres, on 15 March 1892. On 25 April, the day before Ravachol was to be sentenced, the Cafe Very in which Ravachol was arrested was also bombed, killing the owner and a customer as well as injuring numerous others. Seeking asylum in Great Britain, like other contemporaries such as Jean-Pierre François he lived as a political refugee in London for a time before his eventual arrest by Scotland Yard detective William Melville at London Victoria station on 4 April 1894.

Extradited to France in June, Meunier was tried the following month and sentenced to life imprisonment in a penal colony in Cayenne. He would remain there for 14 years until his death in 1907, following a failed escape attempt. He had been in correspondence with fellow French anarchist Jean Grave the previous year and, in one letter expressed no remorse for his crimes stating "I only did what I had to do. If I could start over again, I would do the same thing."

He was used as the main antagonist of detective Sherlock Holmes in René Réouven's 1985 novel L'Assassin du Boulevard.
