= Ravachol =

French anarchist (1859–1892)

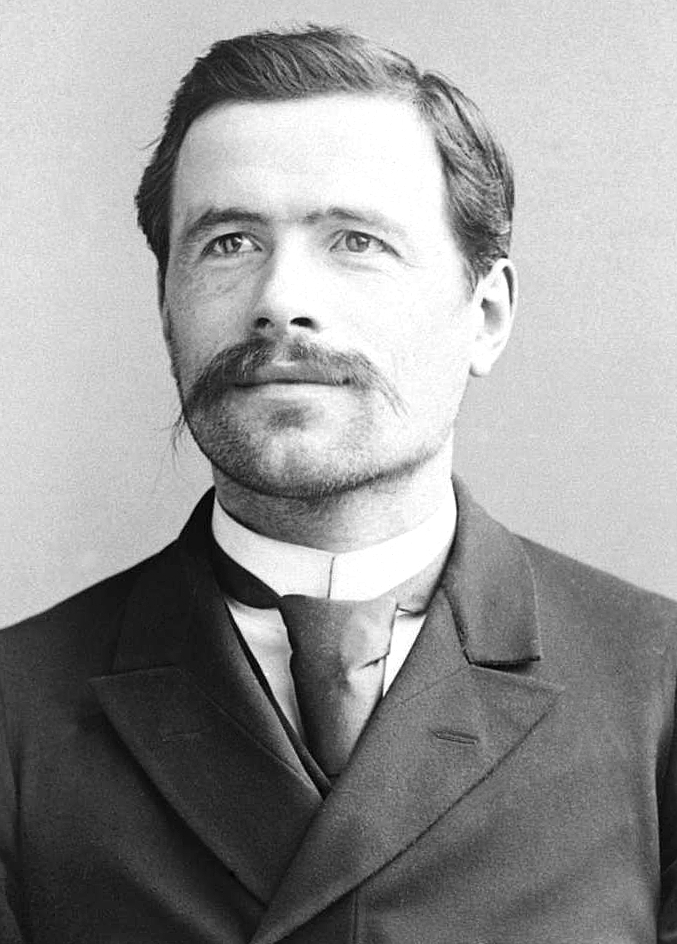
- Ravachol's mugshot taken by Alphonse Bertillon (Anthropometric File of Anarchists - 1892)
- Born: François-Claudius Koenigstein; 14 October 1859; Saint-Chamond, France
- Died: 11 July 1892 (aged 32); Montbrison, France
- Known for: Political bombings
- Movement: Anarchism
- Criminal penalty: Execution

François-Claudius Ravachol (French: [ʁavaʃɔl]; born Koenigstein; (Note: Alternatively spelled Koënigstein or Koeningstein.) 14 October 1859 – 11 July 1892), also known as the Christ of Anarchy, was a French illegalist anarchist mainly known for his terrorist activism, the myths that developed around his figure, and his influence on the anarchist movement, French society and art. He is also credited as being one of the main launchers of the Ère des attentats (1892-1894).

Born in 1859 in Saint-Chamond, in the Saint-Étienne area, Ravachol grew up in poverty and domestic violence. Later, he began a life of crime marked by the murder and robbery of a rich hermit. In this city, Ravachol gradually adopted anarchist ideas and met other activists, such as Rosalie Soubère and Joseph Jas-Béala. He managed to escape from arrest, and with these two accomplices, the militant moved to Paris in 1891. There, joined by the young anarchist militant Charles Simon, Clotilde Mabillon, her husband Chaumartin and maybe Gustave Mathieu, they carried out the Saint-Germain and Clichy bombings, targeting the judge and prosecutor responsible for the judicial persecution of anarchists arrested during the Clichy affair (1891).

Quickly arrested after the second attack, he stood trial, took full responsibility for the bombings in an effort to protect his companions, and was sentenced to life imprisonment with mitigating circumstances granted by the jury. Later, he was tried for the hermit’s murder and condemned to death, ultimately being guillotined on 11 July 1892, at Montbrison.

Although he was swiftly captured, arrested, and executed shortly after his attacks, which caused no fatalities, Ravachol is widely regarded as one of the launchers of the Ère des attentats, a wave of anarchist terrorism from 1892 to 1894. His assumption of full responsibility, efforts to exonerate his companions, and transformation from criminal to "people's avenger" in a sense, made him a martyr for anarchists and a folk hero within the French population. He also became the cultural archetype of the "anarchist terrorist". Ravachol's actions also marked a turning point in the evolution of terrorism; he was one of the first terrorists to move away from a symbolism centered on individuals and toward one centered on locations, targeting a place as much as a person, in his case. This aspect has become important in modern terrorism but was little understood by the contemporary press, which failed to grasp the motivations behind his actions.

Since then, he has become the avatar of numerous cultural adaptations, being variously portrayed in art and media as a vigilante acting to save humanity, a rebel without morals, or in more ironic and satirical takes that use his image to mock the authorities and the wealthy, as seen in traditional Parisian songs.

== Biography ==
=== Birth and youth ===
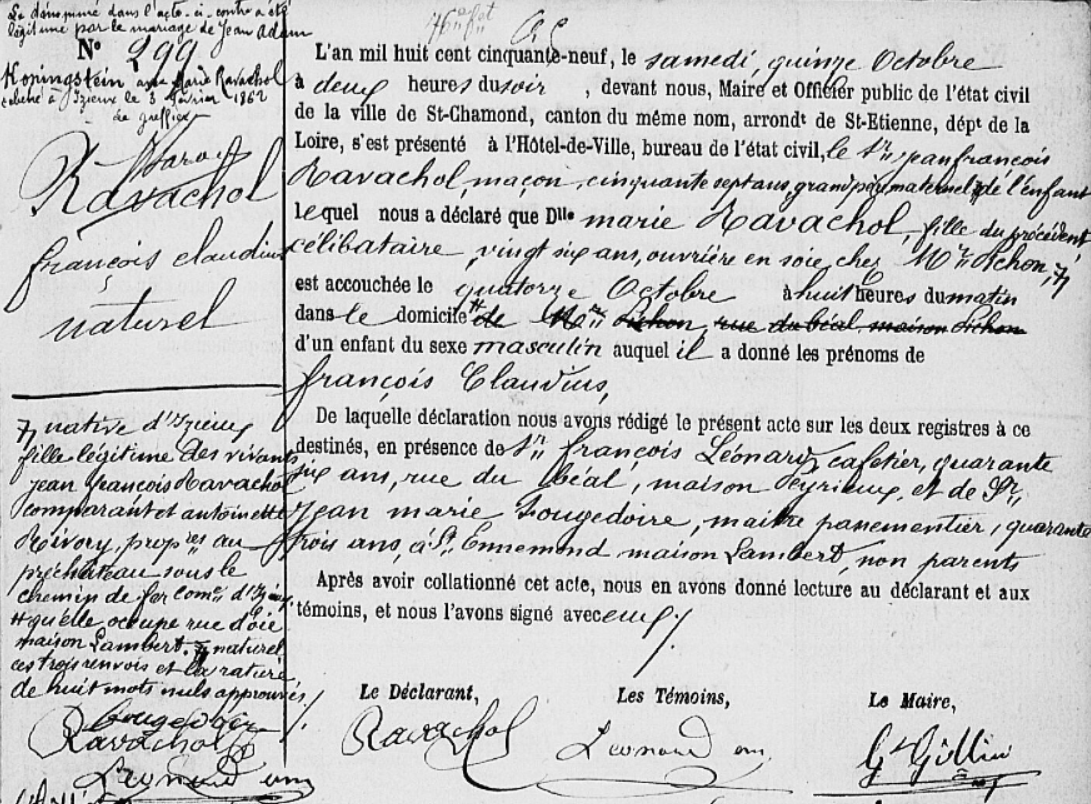
François Ravachol's birth certificate in the Archives départementales de la Loire. 15 October 1859.

François-Claudius Ravachol was born 14 October 1859 in Saint-Chamond, Loire. He was the eldest child of the four children of a Dutch father (Jean Adam Koenigstein) and a French mother (Marie Ravachol). His father beat his mother and eventually abandoned the family, leaving Marie Ravachol and their children alone. For her part, she worked, whenever she had the opportunity, as a laborer in a raw silk industry. His mother frequently sent him to beg for money for the family and he started working at a very young age, even though he was attending school.

He left school at the age of eleven, after being bullied by his classmates because he wore "shabby" clothes. Around this time, he worked as a livestock herder during the winter, doing so without proper shoes, which caused his feet to be constantly frozen. His younger sister died of fever around this period. In the following years, Ravachol worked as a shepherd but also as a miner and in various other industries in the region. He was once fired from a job for arriving five minutes late, despite having worked many unpaid overtime hours. Around the age of 16, he secured a position in Saint-Chamond as an apprentice dyer with Richard and Puteau. However, this apprenticeship ended without the dyers deciding to keep him on or teach him more about their craft in greater detail. For additional income he played accordion at society balls on Sundays at Saint-Étienne for 5 francs per evening.

=== Militantism, crimes, anarchism ===
When he completed his apprenticeship without success, Ravachol left Saint-Chamond and the Saint-Étienne region to go to Lyon in search of work. There, he began attending public readings in study circles that read socialist and anarchist newspapers. At the age of 18, Ravachol read the book The Wandering Jew (1844) by Eugène Sue, which, according to his own testimony, started his distancing from religious ideas. After a lecture given by the communard Paule Minck, in which she discussed the Semaine sanglante (Bloody Week), on 3 December 1881, in Saint-Chamond, he fully completed his break from religion.

After being dismissed from a new job along with his brother, he found himself unemployed and in poverty. Unable to provide for his family, Ravachol began by stealing chickens, while his brother stole coal. At the same time, he gradually became an anarchist and started attempting to make bombs, though without success at first. He was already in possession of dangerous materials, as he was arrested after supplying sulfuric acid to a woman.

Meanwhile, Marie and François Ravachol entered into conflict: the mother reproached her son for being in an intimate relationship with a married woman. As a result of these accusations, he severed all ties with his mother. Then, on the night of 14 to 15 May 1891, in Terrenoire, he dug up the grave of Baroness de la Rochetaillée with the aim of finding and retrieving her jewelry. He found nothing and returned empty-handed. Ravachol also began selling alcohol illegally and got involved in counterfeiting operations.

On 18 June 1891, in Chambles, he murdered and robbed Jacques Brunel, a 93-year-old hermit who had lived off alms and charity. Though seemingly without resources, the elderly man was not poor; he had amassed donations for over fifty years while pretending to be extremely impoverished, which made him a man of relatively considerable wealth. Ravachol was then arrested for this murder but managed to escape. According to the police: as they seized him after observing his residence, he struggled, insulted them, and declared that the anarchists' revenge would fall upon the officers. Then, while he was being transferred, the police encountered an accomplice of Ravachol, carrying a package, who came directly at them to block their path. As the officers began questioning him about why he was there and what he was carrying, he responded by insulting them. Suddenly, Ravachol then shoved two officers near him with a shoulder blow and fled at high speed towards Terrenoire, where the pursuing police lost his trail in the deep night that had fallen. When the police returned to the initial point of the escape to find the alleged accomplice, he had disappeared.

Police informant X2 view on the Ravachol-Saint Denis networks prior to the attacks

He spent some time hiding in the home of two of his companions, Rosalie Soubère and Joseph Jas-Béala. On 30 July, the press reported on two letters he had sent them—each written in different handwriting. In the first, he mocked the police, saying he had been able to walk around publicly the previous Sunday in Terrenoire, a district of Saint-Étienne. He noted that the prefecture had been wrong to search for him near the nearby dam, as he had 'no desire to drown', and that if he had wanted to take a swim, he would rather have gone to Andrézieux. In the second letter, he said he was heading to Vichy and intended to return on 9 August to attend the city’s industrial exhibition. Toward the end of August 1891, a guard found this note signed Ravachol at the foot of a statue there:

I visited the fine arts exhibition. I found it fairly good. However, I reserved the right to critique some of the paintings later.

He also fled to Spain sometime after the murder. This is where he found refuge with Paul Bernard, another exile. It is speculated that during this time in Spain, particularly Barcelona, Ravachol learned how to make bombs. In August, 1891, he traveled to Paris using a fake name and 'met up with other Parisian anarchists'. At this meeting, he met Henri Louis Descamps' wife, Descamps being one of the arrested and judged during the Clichy affair. There, Charles Chaumentin and his wife, both anarchist militants, welcomed and hosted him.

=== Radicalization of 'Ravachol's band' ===
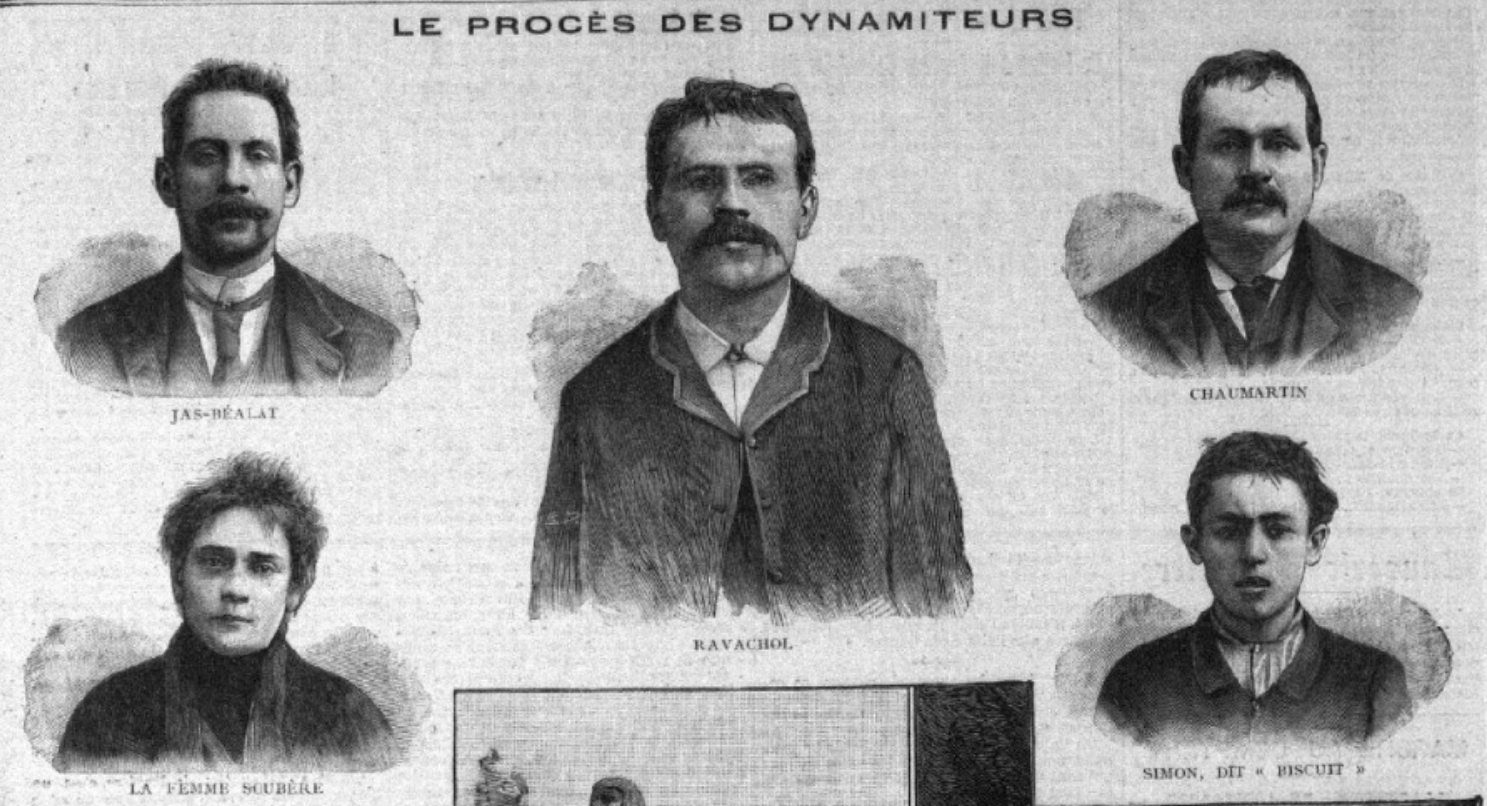
Depiction of Ravachol's band in Le Petit Parisien : supplément illustré (1st May 1892) with the title 'The trial of dynamiters' : Rosalie Soubère, Ravachol, Charles Simon, Joseph Jas-Béala and Charles Chaumartin

Ravachol was joined there by Soubère and Jas-Béala, which is probably an indication that the group was already planning to launch attacks targeting the authorities in Paris. The group also met Charles Simon, a young anarchist militant whom Chaumentin introduced to them by declaring that he 'knew Paris like the back of his hand' and that he was someone capable of helping them with their plans.

Indeed, the situation in France was very tense between the anarchists and the French state, which radicalized Ravachol and his group. They reacted primarily to two major events: in 1891, the Fourmies massacre, where the army fired on demonstrators demanding an eight-hour workday, and the Clichy affair, where anarchists were arrested, struck with sabers, beaten, and deprived of water and care by the police for some time. The fact that the anarchists arrested after the Clichy affair were judged with great severity, with prosecutor Léon Bulot demanding the death penalty for all three and judge Edmond Benoît (1843–1909) sentencing them to harsh prison terms of two and five years, had a significant impact on anarchist circles in France and acted as the catalyst for the attacks carried out by Ravachol. Deeply shocked by these developments, Ravachol decided to take action against the magistrates responsible for the judicial persecution of the Clichy anarchists.

On the night of 14–15 February 1892, the group, managed to seize thirty kilograms of dynamite by stealing it from the Soisy-sur-Seine quarry, giving them the possibility to use this significant arsenal in the preparation of attacks.

=== Bombings ===
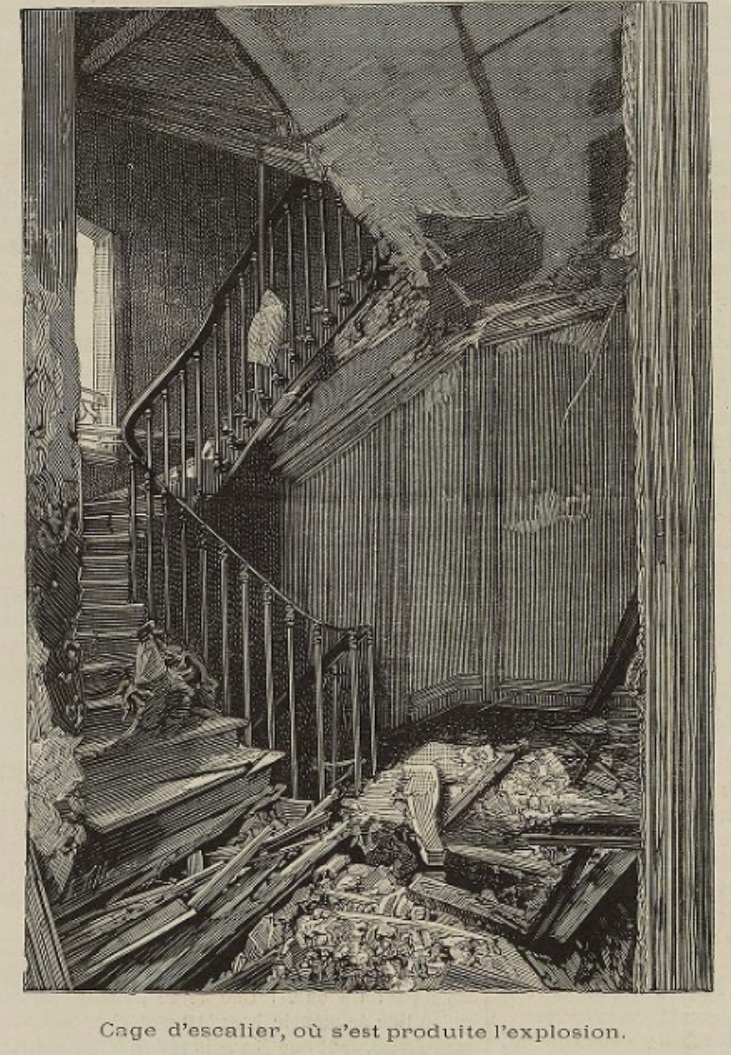
Representation of the aftermath of the Saint-Germain bombing in L'Illustration (19 March 1892)

In the following days, Ravachol and Simon built the bomb, Simon conducted a first reconnaissance of the judge's residence at 136 Boulevard Saint-Germain, and then the group of four took the tramway to carry out the attack on 11 March 1892. Soubère sat between Simon and Béala and carried the bomb, hiding it under her skirts. She then handed it to Ravachol, who, armed with two loaded pistols, entered the building, placed the bomb on the second floor, the center of the building—since he did not know exactly where Benoît lived. He lit the fuse and fled, while Soubère and Béala stood watch outside. The militant remained on-site to observe the aftermath of the explosion as his companions left the area.

The bombing caused no deaths, did not hit judge Benoît, who lived on the fifth floor, and injured one person.

The anarchists involved in the plan were not satisfied with the failure of their operation: they decided to make another attempt soon after, this time targeting the prosecutor in the Clichy affair, Bulot. This preparation was complicated by the arrest of Simon after the betrayal of Charles Chaumentin, turned police informant, who denounced them. According to Jean Maitron and Rolf Dupuy, this denunciation by the traitorous anarchist actually provided little help to the police, as the authorities already knew most of the information he provided. Ravachol subsequently committed the Clichy bombing in the next days, with a similar mode of action, but this time injuring seven people in the process, while still not killing their target, Bulot.

=== Denunciation and arrest ===
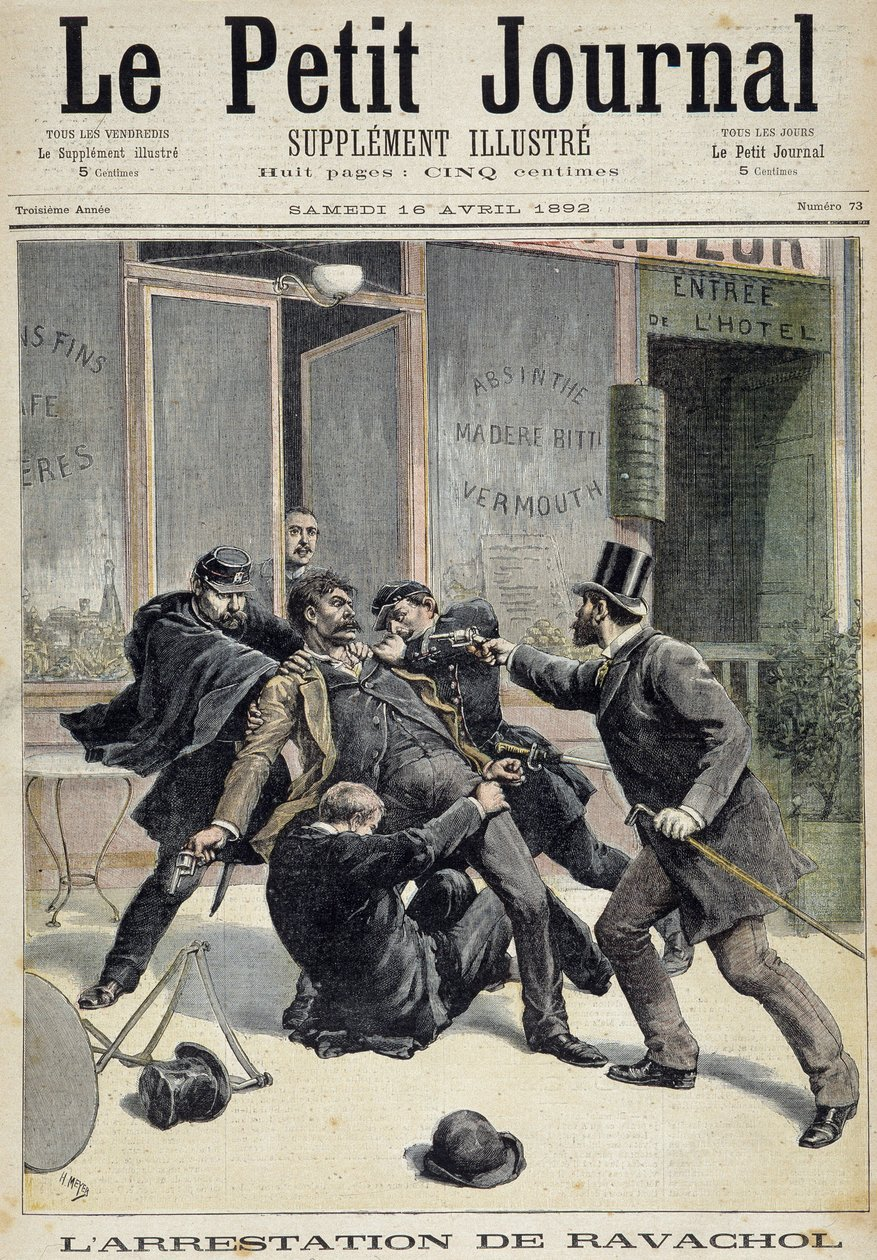
Artist's rendition of the arrest of Ravachol.

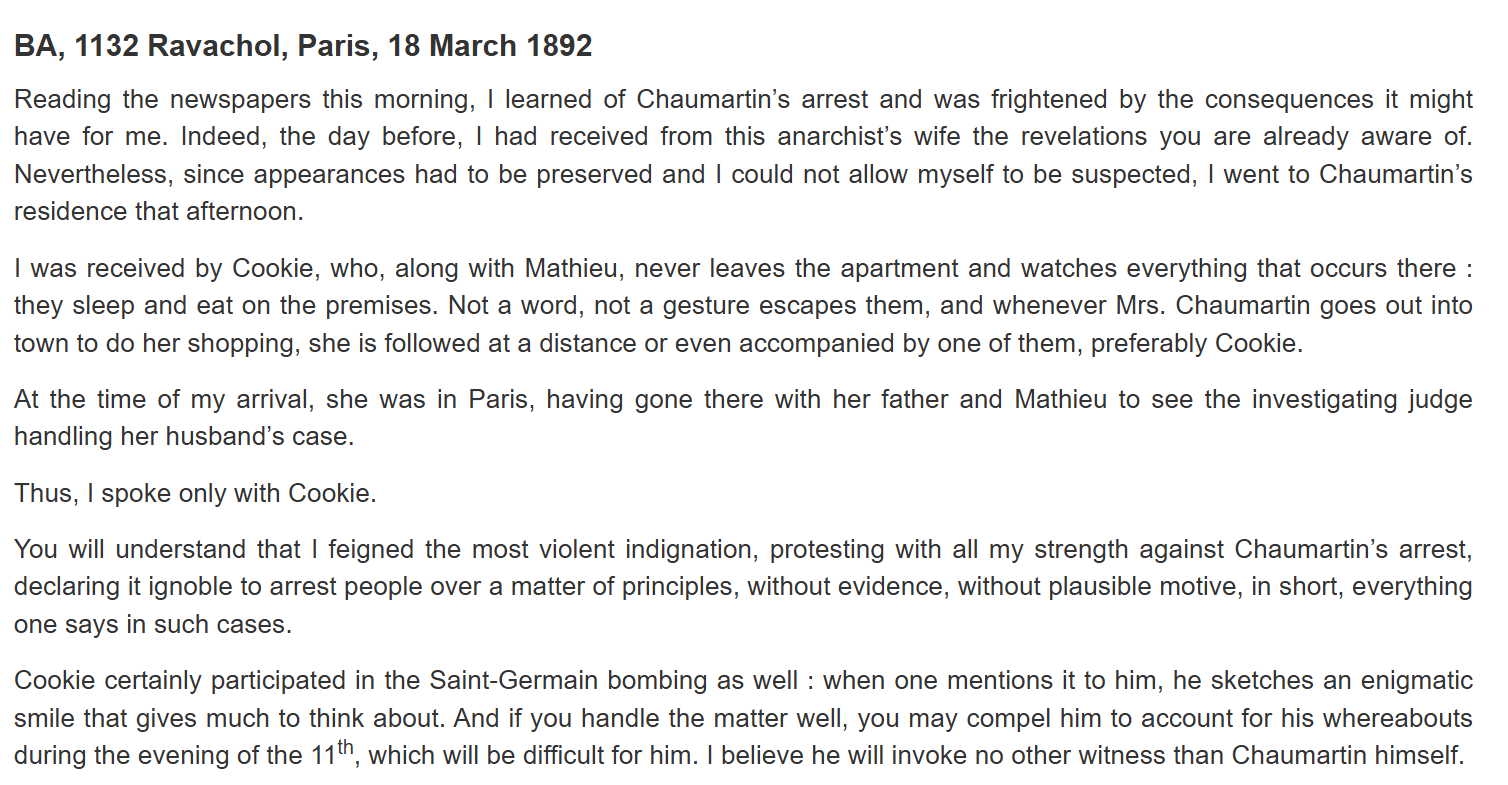
X2 speaking about the state of Ravachol's band after the attack (The Anarchist Library - Anarchiv)

On 30 March 1892, Ravachol, then in hiding and dining at the restaurant Le Véry on 22 Boulevard Magenta, was recognized by an employee, Jules Lhérot, who quickly passed the information on to the restaurant's owner, Jean‑Marie Véry. Véry decided to alert the police and denounced Ravachol to the authorities, leading to his arrest. The police became aware of the dangerous situation of their informants and increased security measures around the restaurant.

This did not prevent the anarchist militants Jean-Pierre François and Théodule Meunier from carrying out the Véry bombing, where they exacted revenge for Véry's collaboration and succeeded in killing him. The trial opened the next day, on 26 April 1892.

=== First part of the trial ===
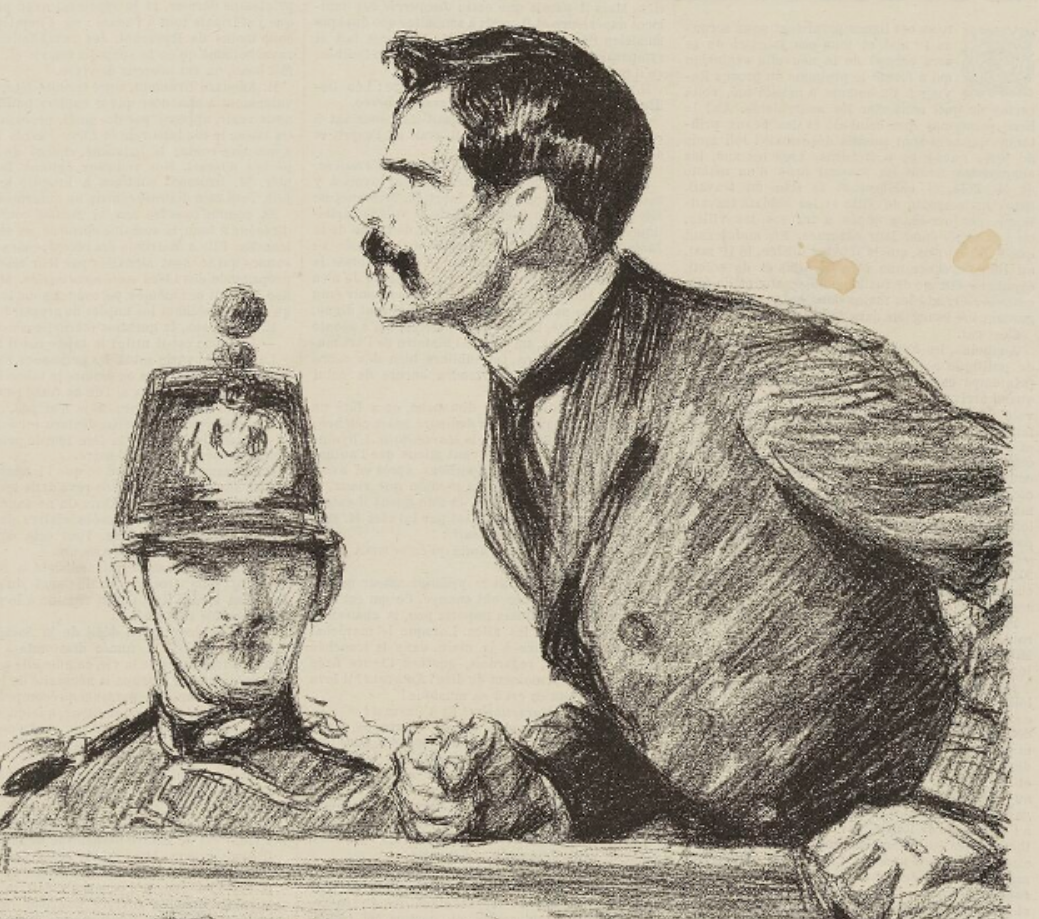
Ravachol defending himself during his trial, L'Illustration (30 April 1892)

The trial of Ravachol and his accomplices opened on 26 April 1892 at the Seine Assizes Court. According to Gilles Ferragu, this was an extraordinary trial for several reasons. First of all, it was divided into two parts: the trial for the Paris bombings was assigned to the Seine Assizes Court, while the trial for the hermit's murder and other crimes that the police accused Ravachol of committing was scheduled for a later date in Montbrison.

It was also the first trial of such magnitude for an anarchist terrorist, and a moment of wavering for the republican order established by the French Third Republic. The authorities were extremely uncomfortable with this trial because they had to balance the appearance of a fair trial—where Ravachol would be able to speak openly and freely to legitimize their judicial system as free—while also preventing the trial from becoming a political platform for the anarchist. The royalist press notably highlighted the paradox of this political trial, which already foreshadowed the Dreyfus affair, mocking the Third Republic by pointing out that the republicans, who had once advocated insurrection and revolution, were now being outflanked on their left.

The authorities then implemented measures aimed at controlling the composition of the jury in their favor and ensuring that the attending public was carefully selected. Later during the Ère des attentats, laws would be passed to restrict press freedom during anarchist trials. As for Ravachol, he was assisted by Parisian anarchist circles: his lawyer, Lagasse, former lawyer of one of the arrested during the Clichy affair, referenced a number of militants who helped gather information about the jurors in an attempt to challenge the inclusion of individuals likely to convict Ravachol.

The defensive strategy of Ravachol and Lagasse was to highlight the political dimension of the trial and to defend the reason behind the attacks.

Ravachol could not read very well, so he began the trial with a written statement on a piece of paper, reading it with difficulty. In it, he declared:

I struck the president Mr. Benoît:
1° Because he showed himself to be too biased during the Decamps trial and because he increased the sentence to the maximum;
2° Because he paid no attention to the violence committed by the police against Decamps and Dardare, who were left for dead.
My vengeance targeted Mr. Bulot because he had demanded the death penalty against an honest father. I wanted to make those responsible for enforcing punishments understand that they should be more lenient.
As for the innocent victims I may have harmed, I sincerely regret it. I regret it all the more because my life has been full of bitterness.
I deeply regret also bringing to these benches people whose only fault was knowing me. Anarchy aims to make society one big family where the weakest will be protected by all, where everyone will have enough to eat.

During the trial, rumors circulated in the press suggesting that Ravachol and Lagasse were attempting to make Pierre Martinet, one of the theorists of individualist anarchism who was imprisoned at the time, speak about anarchism at the court. These events demonstrated that the French state was overwhelmed by the events to the point that, instead of resorting to its usual rhetoric after an attack—where the perpetrator was dehumanized and the restoration of order staged—the press naturally assumed that an anarchist might come to express his opinions during the trial. Anarchism was thus considered legitimate to present as a counterpoint to state ideology within the trial itself by the press, showing the impact of Lagasse's defence.

An 'anonymous' juror who quoted in Le Figaro noted Ravachol's unveiling of the established ritual of the political trial:

It is the trial of a party that he is bringing before us; it is anarchy alone that he asks us to condemn in his defence, and in doing so, he transforms us, without our realizing it, into politicians sitting in a sort of political tribunal.

Ultimately, Ravachol was found guilty by the jury, with Simon, but with mitigating circumstances, which made them avoid the death penalty and instead be sentenced to life in penal labour. Soubère and Béala were acquitted, like Chaumentin.

=== Second part of the trial ===
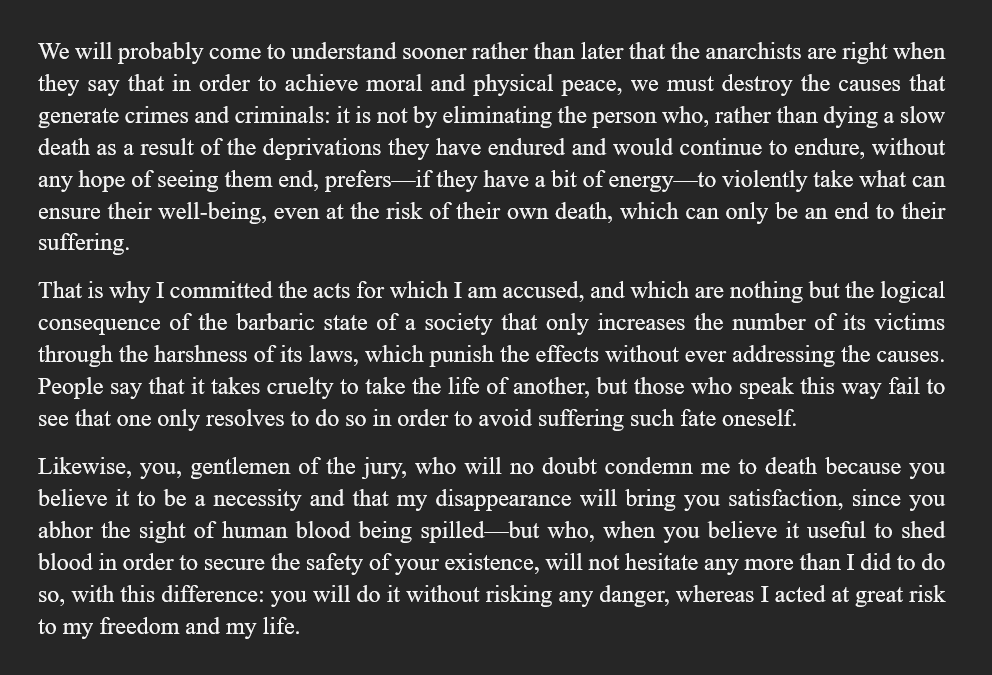
Translation of a portion of Ravachol's statement, which he wasn't allowed to read during his second trial (21 June 1892)

Ravachol's second trial was on 21 June 1892, before the Loire Assize Court in Montbrison, for the crimes that predated the bombings. He admitted to the grave robbing and to murdering the hermit of Chambles, in 1891, something he had never denied but denied the other charges.

His brother and sister supported him by testifying to his role as a father during their childhood. He was ultimately convicted and sentenced to death for this series of crimes and for others that he probably didn't commit. After his condemnation to death, he declared:

May my innocent and involuntary victims understand and forgive me. [...] Long live anarchy!

He was refused the right to read a final statement, which he gave instead to his lawyer. The statement was very probably written by Ravachol with corrections and help from his lawyer and other anarchists. As soon as he was sentenced to death, the authorities sought to carry out his execution as quickly as possible and were pleased that he refused to appeal the sentence.

=== Execution ===
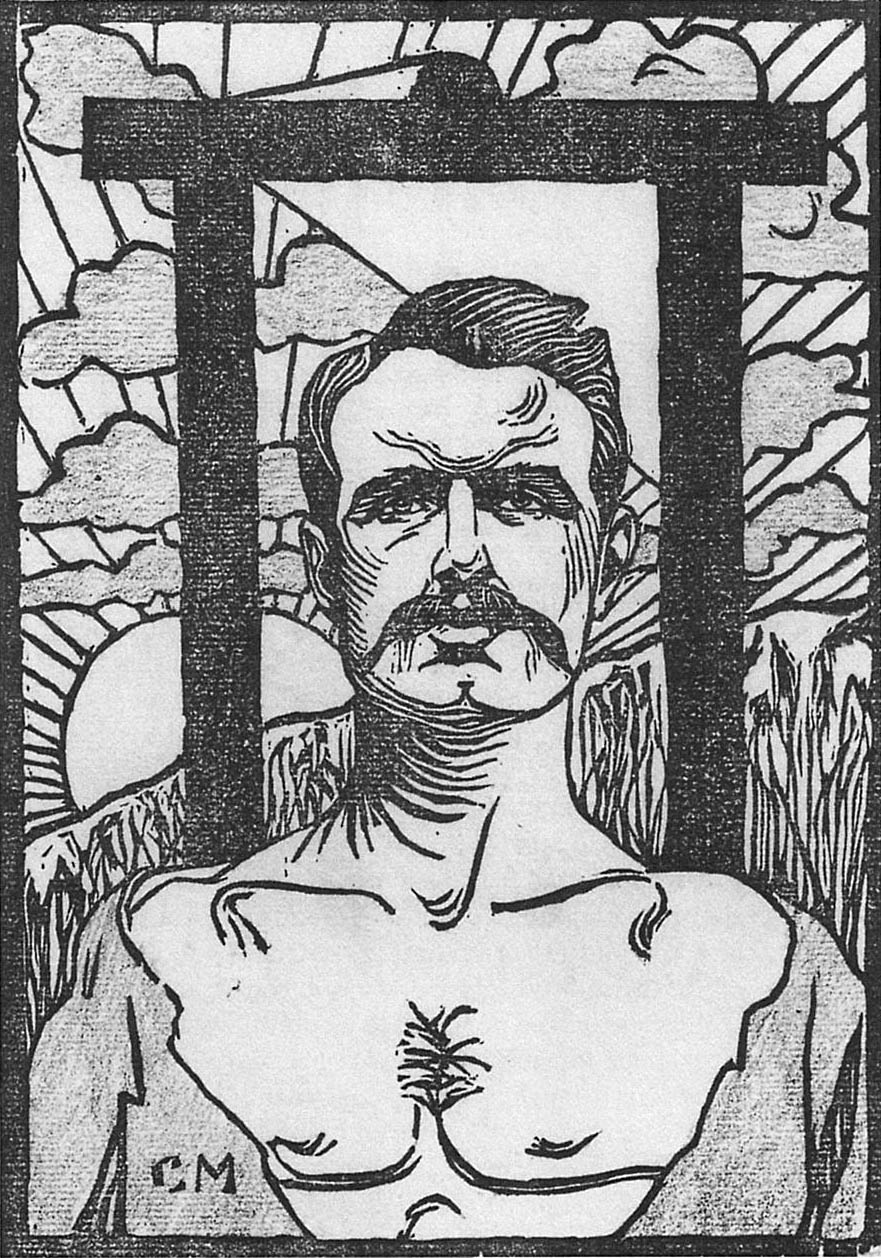
Woodcut depicting Ravachol by Charles Maurin, 1893

Ravachol was executed on 11 July 1892 at Montbrison. He spoke briefly with his jailers before being transferred to the guillotine. During these conversations, he first refused to have a drink but then decided to have a glass of wine mixed with water. He openly refused the chaplain and declared to his jailers:

Courage, it’s easy to say, but you can’t always be sure you’ll have it in moments like this; I’ll have some, if I can.—Look, they’re giving me my finest clothes; I’ll be stylish, it’s like I’m going to a ball.—The chaplain? I don’t want him. Consolations at a time like this are nonsense! Religion, I don’t give a damn about it. It’s only good for idiots, and all people are idiots.

Ravachol was then placed in a van and transferred to the execution location. During the travel, he repeatedly sang the sixth stanza of La Chanson du Père Dûchene. He was positioned right next to the guillotine and stepped toward the gathered crowd to speak a few words but was interrupted by the executioners, who placed him in the guillotine before he could finish. His last words, as his head was about to be severed, were:

Pigs, long live the Republi...!

== Posterity ==
=== Myth(s) of Ravachol ===
==== Anarchist circles, practices and thought ====
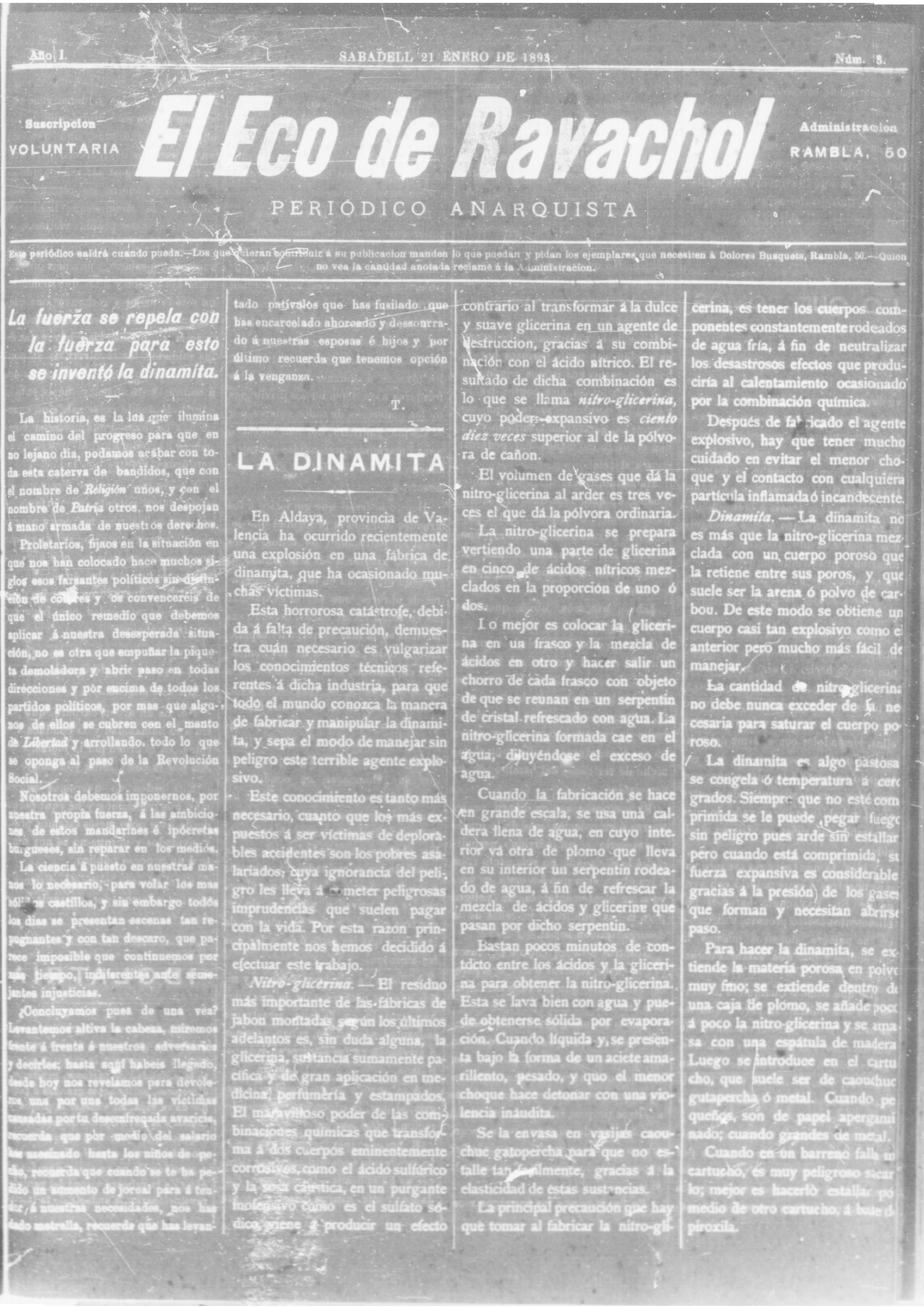
Front page of the third issue of El Eco de Ravachol, a Spanish-speaking Catalan anarchist newspaper (January 1893)

Ravachol was the first anarchist guillotined in France, as noted by Émile Pouget. Within anarchist circles, his figure was initially met with distance and disapproval, as the fact that Ravachol had committed 'vile' crimes—such as desecrating graves or murdering a hermit—before engaging in political attacks was poorly received by many anarchists, who initially distanced themselves from his actions. However, his two 'legitimate' bombings, his decision to take full responsibility for them—protecting his companions—and his execution changed his reception. His image was thus rehabilitated by anarchists, who gradually transformed him into a hero and a martyr. Hélène Millot describes the rapid evolution of his image within anarchist circles in France as follows:

The anarchist press did not immediately rally behind Ravachol, who seemed to many to be disreputable, or even suspicious. [...] Within a few days, Ravachol gained political legitimacy and became the hero of Anarchy—or rather its herald: he had indeed used his trial as a platform for propaganda, turning it into a political forum, a practice that all subsequent anarchists brought to trial would emulate (as a result, authorities soon banned the press from transcribing trial proceedings and pleas). His demeanor compelled the admiration of all the journalists present at the trial. Moreover, he was remarkably defended by his lawyer, Lagasse.

Ravachol became a figure of martyrdom for anarchists, even Christ-like. He was compared to Jesus-Christ in anarchist art; for example, Paul Adam wrote about him:

To have affirmed the right to existence at the risk of being vilified by the herd of civic slaves and of incurring the ignominy of the scaffold, to have conceived as a technique the elimination of the useless in order to support an idea of liberation, to have had the audacity to conceive it and the devotion to carry it out, is this not sufficient to deserve the title of Redeemer?

This Christ-like perspective of Ravachol was based on parallel narratives between the Christian story and that of the anarchist: he sought to convert all the individuals he encountered to anarchism, including his guards; he died at the age of 33; he went to his 'martyrdom' singing—in this case, a deeply anticlerical song, paradoxically—much like in traditional Christian hagiographies. However within anarchist circles, this comparison of Ravachol to Christ was not shared by everyone and was rather primarily defended by intellectuals with relatively loose ties to anarchism with the exception of Louise Michel in Today or Tomorrow.

The arrest, trial, and execution of the anarchist militant greatly inspired other activists of the period, who followed in his footsteps during the Ère des attentats. Thus, in France, Théodule Meunier, Auguste Vaillant, and Émile Henry were deeply influenced by Ravachol and sought to avenge him in their respective attacks. In February 1894, Désiré Pauwels planned traps for the Paris police commissioners responsible for Ravachol's arrest but did not injure his intended targets. A commemorative woodcut of Ravachol by the French artist Charles Maurin in 1893 was used on the cover of a 1900s-era bomb making pamphlet La Salute è in voi!, associated with the Italian American Galleanisti anarchists. The Galleanists were proponents of political violence and "propaganda of the deed."

Ravachol was also celebrated in various anarchist songs composed in his honor, such as La Ravachole, to the tune of La Carmagnole. An anarchist group in Belleville, Paris in the late 1890s named themselves "The Avengers of Ravachol".

==== Popular legend and culture ====
From his second attack, the press, knowing nothing of his identity except that he was an anarchist, began portraying Ravachol as a hero intervening to save the people. Poems and songs were published in his honor, such as La Complainte de Ravachol (Ravachol's Lament), and his figure became synonymous with that of an unknown—then known—hero who would avenge the people. In reality, the anarchist specificity of Ravachol was of little interest to this second form of portrayal, which focused more on his status as an 'outlaw'. Millot says, about this re-use:

[The popular songs and texts] all show an obvious sympathy for Ravachol, a sympathy that is directed less toward the anarchist or the criminal than toward the traditionally popular figure of the outlaw. Singing about Ravachol's exploits allows for mocking judges, police officers, property owners, concierges, and waiters—figures that were prime targets for the ridicule of the Parisian working class.

==== Influence on art and French society ====
He became a character in novels, as his biography lent itself well to such developments. Indeed, the anarchist had an unhappy childhood, a life marked by twists and turns, betrayals, impossible loves, and adventures—all elements that made him a favored figure in fin-de-siècle 19th-century French literature. The police hunt for a glorified unknown figure was followed in the media and foreshadowed artistic productions such as the emergence of the character Fantômas, whom Ravachol partly inspired. In reality, the connection between Ravachol and popular adventure novels was made by Ravachol himself, as he stated to have read The Wandering Jew by Eugène Sue and to have evolved politically through it. He thus established a dialectical relationship with literature, both responding to it and inspiring it.

This romanticized portrayal of Ravachol as a hero of the people has continued within French society to this day. Thus, René Dumas’s 1981 biography of Ravachol explicitly adopted novelistic chapter titles to describe his life: 'How the poor shepherd became a smuggler and counterfeiter', 'The monstrous crimes of Saint-Étienne and Izieux', 'Paris, here I come!', 'A bomb under the skirts: the infernal suitcase', 'The astonishing travels of Mr. Deibler'.

Overall, many French writers and artists were influenced by the Ère des attentats (1892-1894), that he launched. Many writers and artists, such as Jean Ajalbert, Francis Vielé-Griffin, Maurice Beaubourg, Paul Claudel, Bernard Lazare, Camille Mauclair, Stuart Merrill, Lucien Muhlfeld, Adolphe Retté, Saint-Pol-Roux, Octave Mirbeau, and Stéphane Mallarmé, were deeply interested with these events.

==== Later inspirations ====
Strasbourg-based Situationist students active in the May 68 events in France associated their manifesto On the Poverty of Student Life with a "Society for the Rehabilitation for Karl Marx and Ravachol".

Two cities in Disco Elysium, Revachol (the game's setting) and Koenigstein, are named after Ravachol.

== Works ==
=== Books ===
- Memoirs, dictated to his jailors, 30 March 1892 (in French on Wikisource) (compilation of some of the police reports during his stay in prison awaiting for his first trial)

=== Speeches ===
- Ravachol (21–22 June 1892). Forbidden Defence speech - Original version. Paris. (in French on Wikisource) (differs substantially in spelling and content from the later Lagasse's revision) (maybe a forgery)
- Ravachol; Lagasse, Louis (1 July 1892). Forbidden Defence speech. Paris: La Révolte.

=== Correspondance ===
- Martinet, Pierre; Ravachol (21–22 April 1892). Letter to Ravachol and Ravachol's request. Paris: Gil Blas.

== Works about Ravachol ==
=== Police sources ===
Collection from the archive-site Archives Anarchistes published on Commons and including:

- 4 U 299 at the Archives départementales of the Loire (1445 pages concerning his second trial).

=== Articles ===
- The trial of the Ravachol's band in La Gazette des tribunaux (27 April 1892)
- The trial of the dynamiters, by Émile Pouget in Le Père Peinard (24 April 1892), defending him and his co-accused during his first trial
- Ravachol! in l'Endehors (1 May 1892) by major Symbolist poet Octave Mirbeau, discussing Ravachol, anarchism and anticolonialism.

=== Songs ===
- La Ravachole by Sébastien Faure, 1905. (in French on Wikisource) (in English on Marxist.org) (Sung in French by Atelier Anarkonia)

== See also ==
- Propaganda of the deed
- Expropriative anarchism
- Illegalism
- Ravachol (parrot)
