= Véry bombing =

1892 anarchist bombing in Paris, France

- Part of Ère des attentats
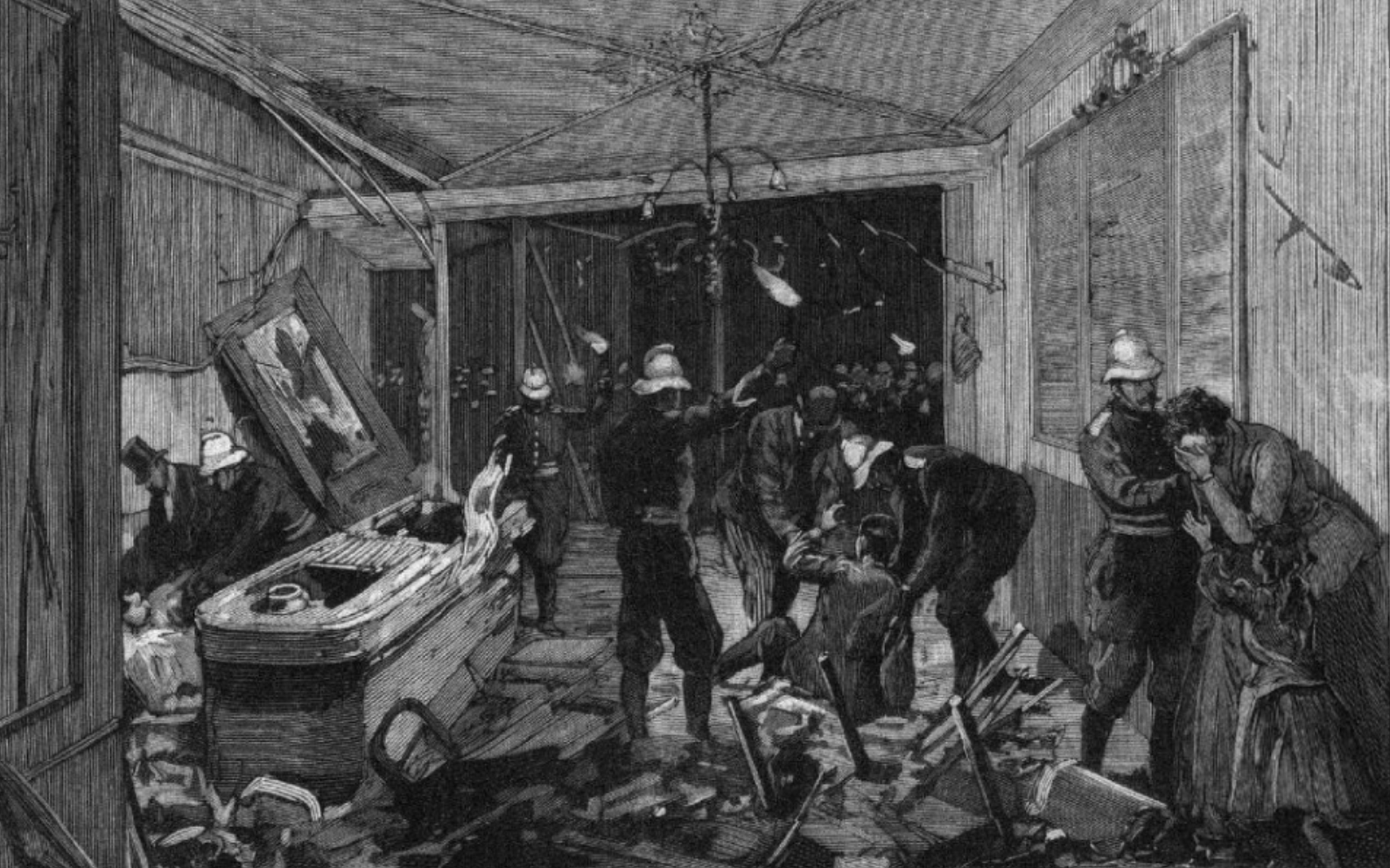
- Depiction of the Véry bombing in Le Petit Parisien : supplément illustré (15 May 1892)
- Location: 48°52′13″N 2°21′42″E; Paris
- Date: 25 April 1892
- Attack type: bombing
- Deaths: 2
- Injuries: At least 1
- Perpetrators: Théodule Meunier; Jean-Pierre François; Fernand Bricout
- No. of participants: 3
- Motive: Anarchism; Revenge for Ravachol being jailed
- Verdict: Guilty (François acquitted)
- Convicted: 2

The Véry bombing was a bomb attack carried out on 25 April 1892 in Paris by the anarchist militants Théodule Meunier, Jean‑Pierre François and Fernand Bricout against the restaurant Le Véry. The three attacked the establishment in response to the arrest of Ravachol, whom the owner of the establishment, Jean‑Marie Véry, had denounced to the police and whose arrest he had enabled. For them, it was a means to target a police informer they considered a legitimate target because of his collaboration with the authorities against the anarchists. The attack pursued the series of acts committed by Ravachol and escalated the tension of the Ère des attentats (1892–1894).

Despite increased security around the establishment, Meunier and François managed to plant a bomb near the counter, killing two people, including their target, Véry. They injured at least one person. The three militants were arrested after the attack; Bricout and his partner Marie Delange decided to cooperate with the police and shifted the blame onto Meunier and François. Meunier was sentenced to life penal labour and deported to the penal colony of Cayenne, where he died in 1907, François was acquitted by the jury that tried him, and Bricout was sentenced to twenty years of hard labor, despite his cooperation with the police.

== Background ==
In the 19th century, anarchism emerged and took shape in Europe before spreading. Anarchists advocated a struggle against all forms of domination perceived as unjust including economic domination brought forth by capitalism. They were particularly opposed to the State, seen as the organization that legitimized these dominations through its police, army and propaganda.

In France, the already conflictual relations between anarchists and the French State, embodied by the Third Republic, entered a new period of intense tension: in 1891, the Fourmies shooting, where the army fired on demonstrators demanding an eight‑hour workday, and the Clichy affair, when anarchists were arrested, beaten and mistreated by the police, radicalized a number of anarchists in France. The fact that the anarchists arrested after the Clichy affair were tried with great severity – the prosecutor demanding the death penalty for the three and the judge handing down harsh prison sentences of three and five years – was an important catalyst for the advent of the Ère des attentats.

== Premises and preparations ==
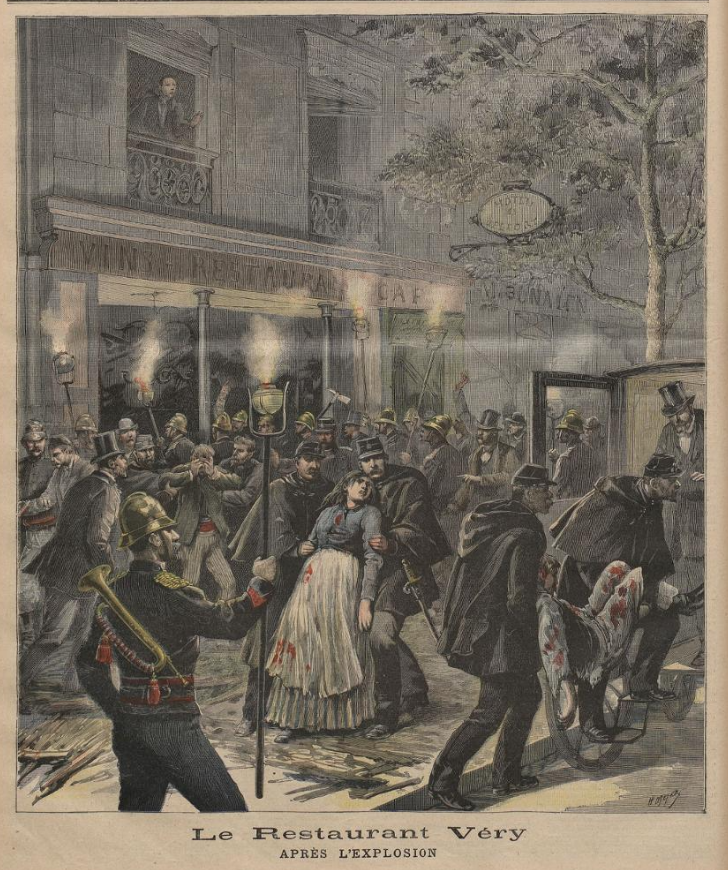
Representation of the Véry bombing aftermath in Le Petit Journal (7 May 1892)

An anarchist, François Koënigstein, known as Ravachol, reacted to this by deciding to assassinate the judge in question in the Saint-Germain bombing and, after his failure, targeted the prosecutor in a new bombing attack. On 30 March 1892, Ravachol, then in hiding and dining at the restaurant Le Véry on 22 Boulevard Magenta, was recognized by an employee, Jules Lhérot, who quickly passed the information on to the restaurant's owner, Jean‑Marie Véry. Véry decided to alert the police and denounced Ravachol to the authorities, leading to his arrest. The police became aware of the dangerous situation of their informants and increased security measures around the restaurant.

Ravachol's arrest propelled French anarchist circles into new perspectives. Various French anarchist militants and circles called for vengeance for his arrest (and later his execution, a few months afterward, for a previous murder and crimes he did not commit).

In this context, three individualist anarchist militants, Théodule Meunier, Jean‑Pierre François, known as 'Francis', and Fernand Bricout, known as 'Bricou', joined forces to target Jean‑Marie Véry and Le Véry. They all belonged to the anarchist group 'Les Pieds‑Plats' ('The Flat Feet'), which mostly brought together militants connected with carpentry. On 10 April 1892, François declared before the International Anarchist Circle:

Lhérot will not benefit from the money he received, I swear it to you.

This perspective was not unique in these circles and was shared by a number of anarchists. One of them, Adolphe Tabarant compared Lhérot to Judas Iscariot, and thus Ravachol to Jesus Christ. He also engaged in texts in defense of Ravachol, shifting the blame onto Lhérot, seen as a traitor to his own. On the same day, 10 April 1892, he wrote in L'En‑dehors:

[His name] is vomited with disgust by all honest and free mouths, a name that will never be flogged enough, worthy of remaining in the dictionary of bourgeois cowardice as a synonym of applauded treason, of snitching made into a duty, of ignominy celebrated, incensed, crowned with flowers, covered in gold, divinized by public baseness.
[...] As long as there are Lhérots, we will excuse the Ravachols.

== Attack ==
Bricout and Meunier built the bomb together while François disappeared and moved out of his home at the beginning of April 1892. On 25 April 1892, the eve of the Ravachol trial was due to start, Meunier and François went to Le Véry. Meunier then placed the briefcase containing the bomb against the counter and the two fled the restaurant. The bomb exploded and killed two people, including Véry. It injured at least one person, a certain Gandon.

== Aftermath ==
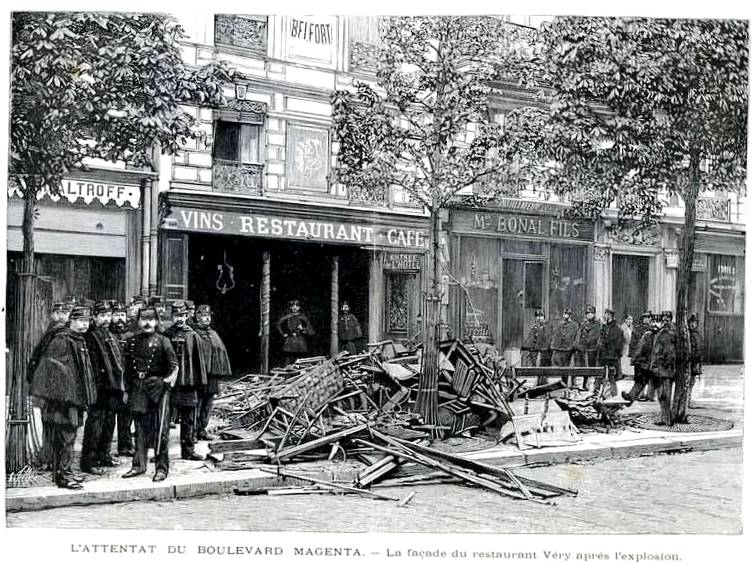
Very restaurant after the bombing.

Immediately after the attack, Le Père Peinard engaged in a 'savage' pun targeting Véry: 'Verification'. The funeral of Véry was organized by the State in the presence of president Émile Loubet. He delivered a speech, in which he declared:

The universal uprising of indignation provoked by the odious crimes recently committed proves to us that this struggle waged against society cannot succeed. Against such wrongdoers, the public authorities will not neglect any of the means provided by the law for the common defense.

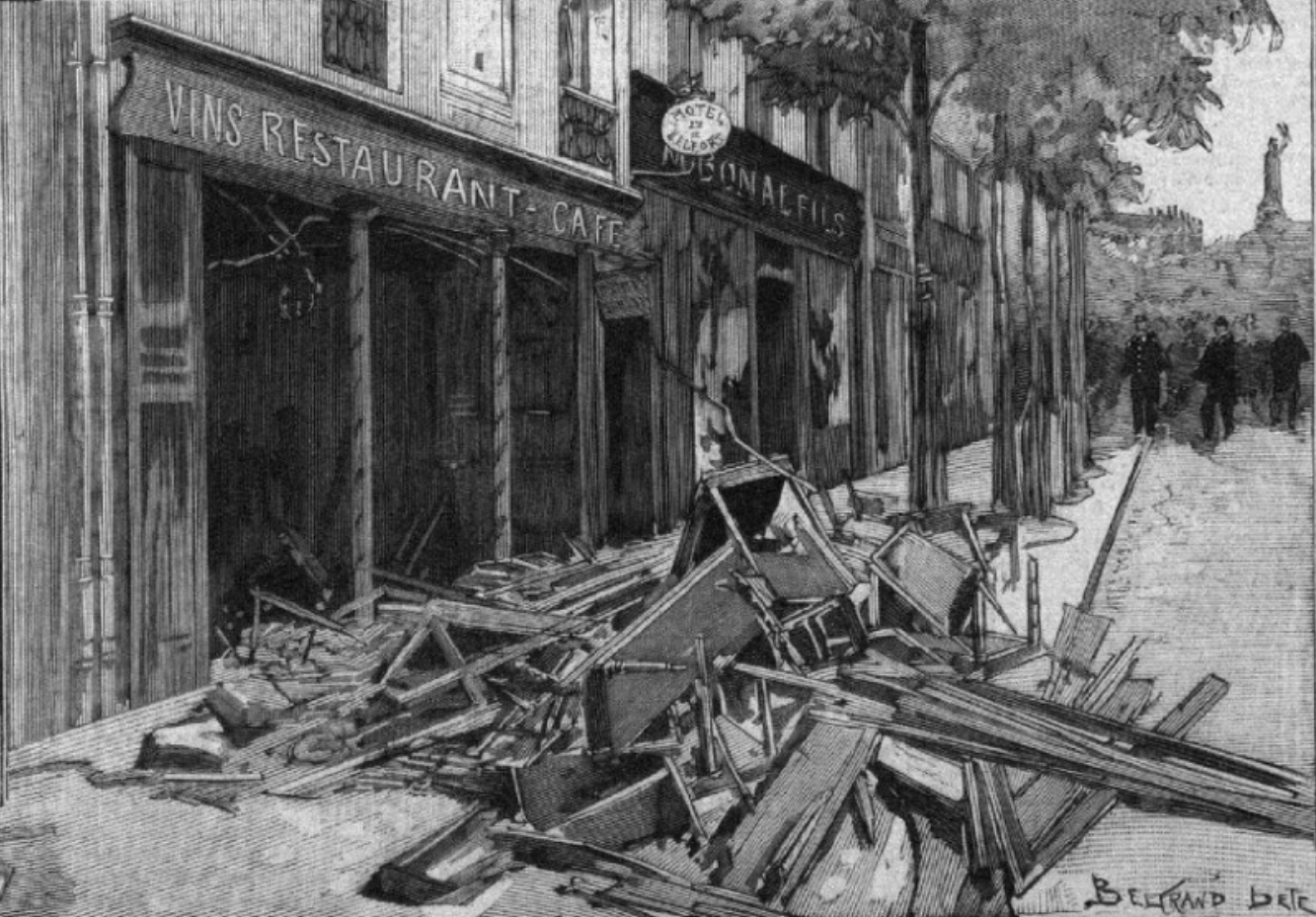
The restaurant after the bombing in Le Petit Parisien : supplément illustré (15 May 1892)

On 27 April 1892, Jean‑Pierre François was arrested by the police and then released after providing an alibi corroborated by about ten witnesses – he was allegedly at Lejeune's. After being denounced to the police by Bricout and his partner Marie Delange, he fled to the United Kingdom and London. France demanded his extradition to bring him to its justice. Despite a struggle against his extradition undertaken by Louise Michel and Peter Kropotkin, among others, the extradition was granted. François and Bricout then faced trial at the Cour d'assises of the Seine. The former was acquitted on 12 April 1893, while Bricout, who had denounced him, was sentenced to 20 years of penal labour.

Meanwhile, Meunier spent the days following the attack in the Santé prison on an unrelated case. This allowed him to avoid the police, which multiplied its efforts to locate him. At the end of his sentence, he managed to reach the United Kingdom where he was arrested in June 1894 before being extradited to France, where he was tried starting on 26 July 1894. The anarchist denied carrying out the attack and was almost acquitted by the jury, but was sentenced by one vote to life penal labour. Sent to the penal colony of Cayenne, he died there in 1907 after two escape attempts, possibly from malaria. He wrote to Jean Grave in 1906:

I regret nothing, I only did what I had to do; if it were to be repeated, I would do the same thing. I do not fear death; if I am condemned, let it come as soon as possible. However, it is regrettable to die in such a way after so many years of suffering spent in penal labor.

Gandon received 2,000 francs in compensation for his injuries in 1895.

== Bibliography ==
- Bouchardon, Pierre (1931). Ravachol et compagnie [Ravachol and company]. Paris: Hachette.
- Jourdain, Edouard (2013). L'anarchisme [Anarchism]. Paris: La Découverte. ISBN 978-2-7071-9091-8.
- Merriman, John M. (2016). The dynamite club: how a bombing in fin-de-siècle Paris ignited the age of modern terror. Yale University Press. ISBN 978-0-300-21792-6.
- Piarotas, Mireille (2000). Regards populaires sur la violence [Popular looks at violence]. Saint Etienne (France): Presses Universitaires de Saint-Etienne (PUSE). ISBN 978-2862721804.
- Ward, Colin (2004). Anarchism: A Very Short Introduction. Oxford University Press (OUP).
