= Decker the Younger =

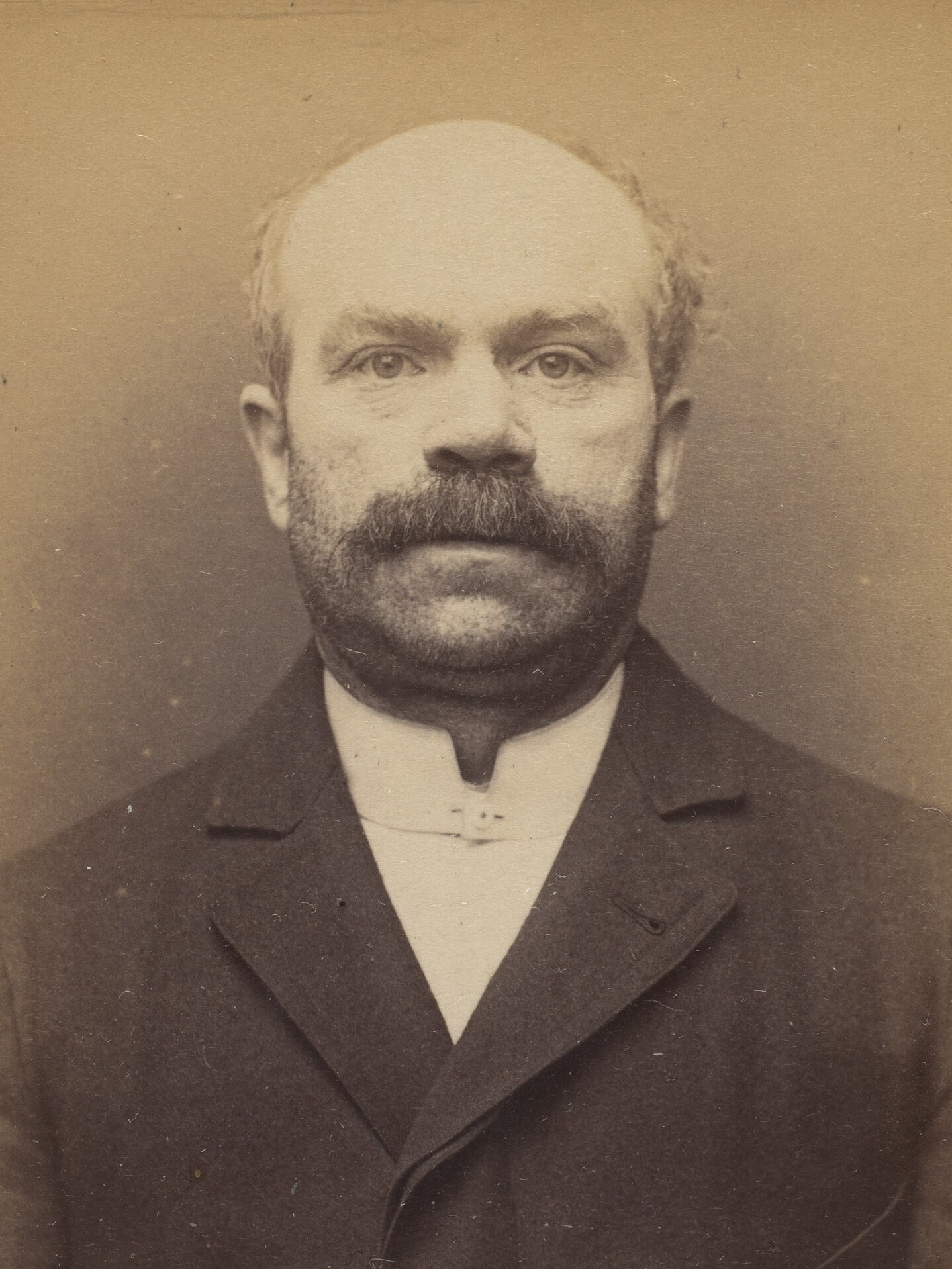
- Joseph Decker's mugshot by Alphonse Bertillon (1894)
- Born: 31 December 1847; Krautergersheim, France
- Died: February 2, 1920 (aged 72); Ivry-sur-Seine, France
- Occupations: tailor, anarchist, syndicalist
- Movement: Anarchism

Signature
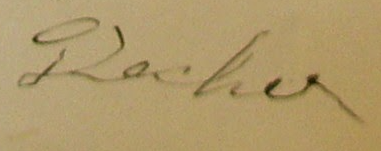

Joseph Decker (31 December 1847 – 2 February 1920), known as Decker the Younger, was a French tailor, anarchist and syndicalist militant.

Born in Bas-Rhin, Decker became a tailor and was convicted of several offenses in his twenties before moving to Paris and joining the anarchist movement in the mid-1880s. He then integrated into numerous anarchist groups, such as The Panther of Batignolles, likely participated in actions supporting Clément Duval, and associated with other French anarchists of that period. Simultaneously, Decker became involved in trade union activities, particularly within the tailoring profession.

He continued his activism at least until the early 20th century.

== Biography ==
Joseph Decker was born in Krautergersheim on 31 December 1847. According to his birth certificate, he was the son of Anne Marie Eber, who was unemployed, and Florent Joseph Decker, a carpenter. He worked as a tailor and faced several convictions starting in his twenties:

- 1 month in prison in Belfort on 27 November 1865 for theft.
- 3 months in Colmar, on 27 June 1867, for fraud.
- 1 month in Schlestadt, on 19 October 1867, for theft.
- 6 months in Paris on 16 January 1869, for theft.

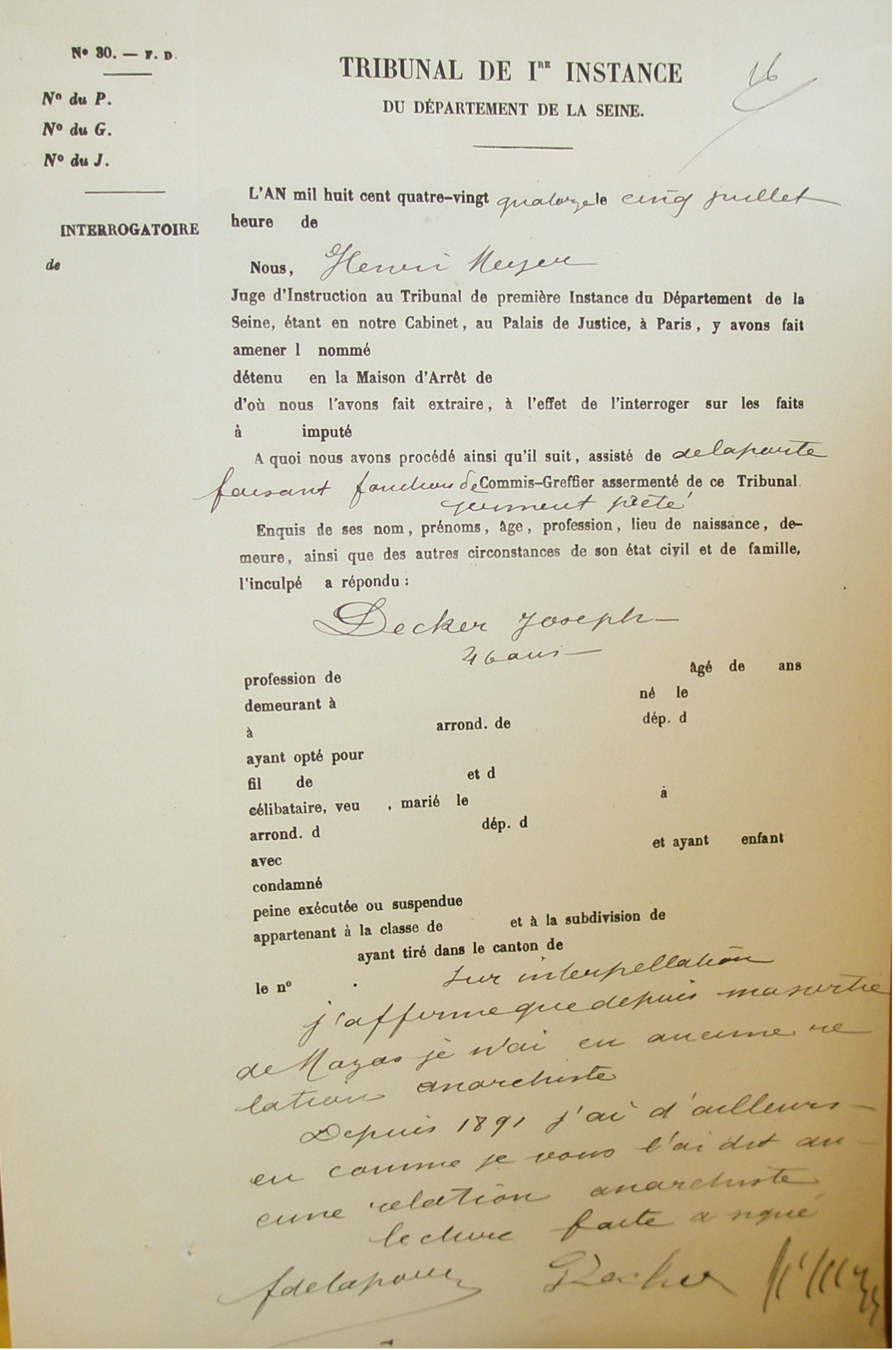
Joseph Decker's declaration to his judge (1894) (courtesy of Archives anarchistes)

During this period, Decker married but was later widowed with no children. In 1872, he chose French nationality over the German one. By 1885, police identified him as an anarchist. He was involved with several anarchist groups, including The Panther of Batignolles, La Sentinelle, Les Deshérités de Clichy, La Ligue antipatriote, and the Chambre syndicale des hommes de peine ('Workers' Trade Union'). Joseph was nicknamed "Decker the Younger" because his older brother, Louis Decker, was also an anarchist.

In 1889, he served as treasurer for the Chambre syndicale des tailleurs ('Tailors' Trade Union'). It's believed that he was the "Decker" responsible for raising funds to help Louise Duval, Clément Duval's partner, join him in the penal colony during his deportation.

On 1 May 1891, police arrested him during International Workers' Day demonstrations. He was carrying an anarchist manifesto and a revolver. He received a 15-day prison sentence, and anarchist companions collected funds to support him during his incarceration. After his release, he frequently attended anarchist gatherings in Montmartre.

In the summer of 1893, the anarchist proposed the creation of anarchist tailor groups in each district.

On 6 March 1894, Decker was arrested during a very violent anarchist raid, when forty French police officers stormed the Duprat cabaret. During the subsequent raid at his home, the police discovered a song, Germinal, records of financial transfers to Jean Grave from when he received his newspaper before 1891, brochures, and an engraving titled The Martyrs de Chicago. Before his judge, he admitted to being an anarchist "if by that, one means someone who wishes to see an era of equality and happiness for everyone" and stated that he did not advocate for propaganda by the deed. The anarchist was provisionally released on 7 May of the same year.

On 1 July, he was arrested and raided again at his partner's home and protested against the arrest. He was released nine days later and, a year later, received a dismissal order from Judge Meyer, who was handling his case.

The police continued to monitor him and note him as an anarchist at least until 1900-1912. He died in Ivry-sur-Seine on 2 February 1920.

== Legacy ==
=== Police mugshot ===
His police photograph is part of the collections of the Metropolitan Museum of Art (MET).

== Bibliography ==
- Dupuy, Rolf (2025), "DECKER, Joseph", Dictionnaire international des militants anarchistes, Paris
- Petit, Dominique (2024), "DECKER Joseph dit DECKER Jeune", Dictionnaire des anarchistes (Le Maitron), Paris: Le Maitron des anarchistes
