= Nicolas Nikitine =

Nikolai Nikitin
- Born: May 3, 1852; Kazan, Russian Empire
- Citizenship: Russia
- Occupations: typographer, anarchist, police informant (?)
- Movement: Anarchism

Nicolas Nikitine or Nikolai Nikitin (in Russian: Николай Никитин), born on 3 May 1852 in Kazan, Russian Empire, and who died on an unknown date, was a Russian typographer and anarchist who operated in France and the United Kingdom in the 1880s and 1890s.

He held a prominent position within the anarchist networks of the period, also being suspected by French police authorities of being the head of a "steering committee" of anarchists composed of Peter Kropotkin, Louise Michel, and Errico Malatesta. He might, in reality, have been a police informant.

== Biography ==
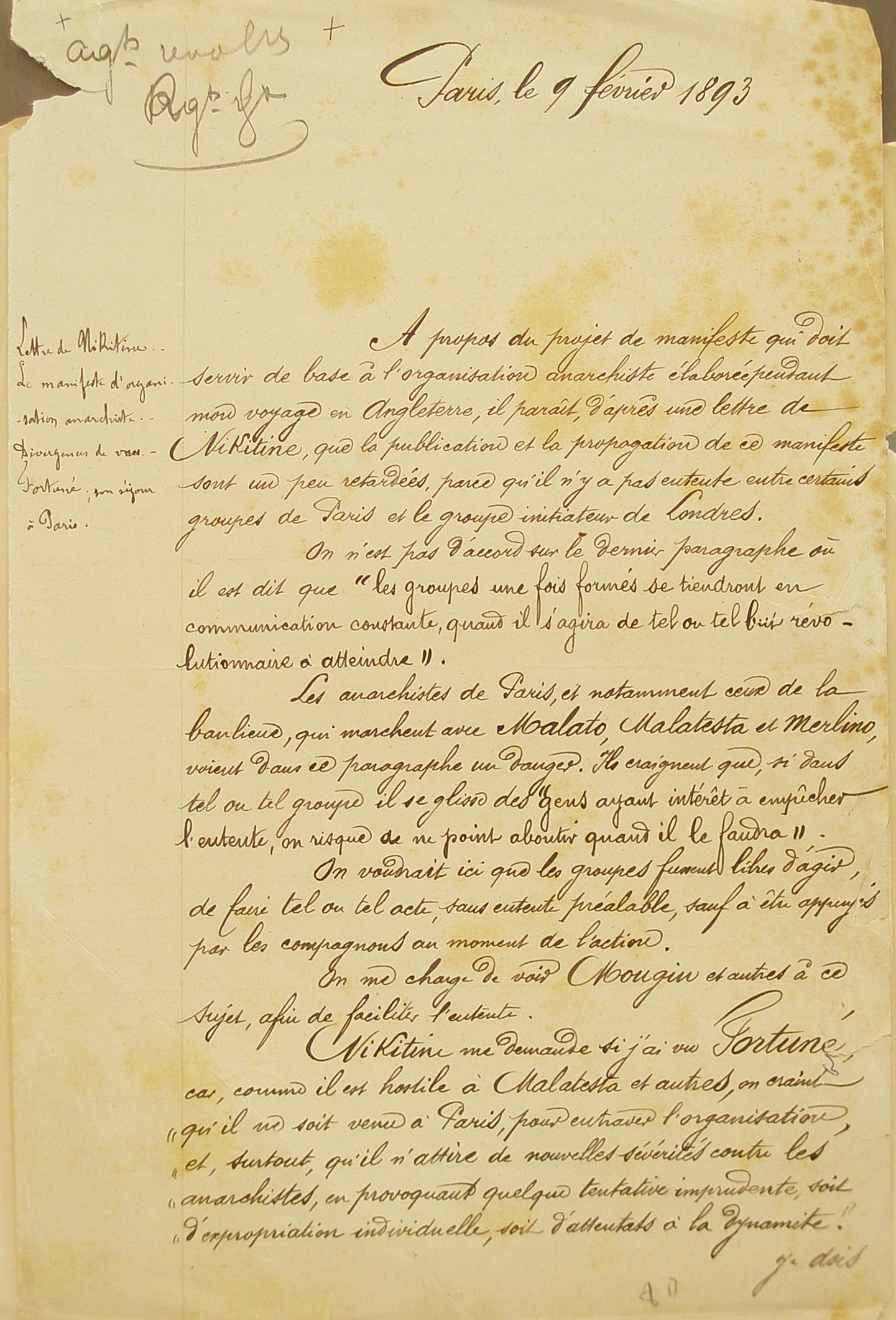
First part of a report providing information on ongoing conflicts within the anarchist movement regarding bombings, with Nikitin and Malatesta fearing a new attack that could intensify repression against anarchists, while Fortuné Henry would support it. (Collection of Archives Anarchistes)

Nikolai Nikitin was born on 3 May 1852 in Kazan, Russian Empire. He was noticed in France from January 1887, where he participated in some meetings of the anarchist group La Panthère des Batignolles and protested there against the death sentence of Clément Duval.

He associated with numerous anarchists of that period in France, for example, Sébastien Faure. Nikitin integrated into the anarchist groups of the northern districts of Paris and Saint-Denis: groups characterised by a young, working-class population and relatively radical, defending ideas such as individual reclamation or propaganda of the deed.

In 1891, he was allegedly one of the anarchist actors in the Clichy affair – a case of anti-anarchist police violence affecting these circles and pushing France into a period that the contemporary press and Jean Maitron called the Ère des attentats (1892–1894).

In April 1892, at the beginning of this period, while he was in London, he was raided several times in France in absence. Implicated in the Trial of the Thirty, he was expelled from the territory in 1893, but the order could not be served on him. Nikitin operated in London during this period and associated there with various anarchists, including Charles Malato, with whom he founded Le Tocsin, an anarcho-communist newspaper.

His movements and activities led French authorities to suspect him of being at the head of a secret anarchist committee that supposedly met in London and sent its instructions worldwide, alongside Errico Malatesta, Louise Michel, and Malato. Peter Kropotkin and Alessandro Marocco were also suspected of being members of an identical or similar committee. These were partly erroneous representations by French informants, who included some of the best-known anarchists in London circles on this list.

In 1898, he was still living in London, and in 1906, the expulsion order against him in France was suspended.

== Legacy ==
=== Nikitin: a police informant? ===
Nikolai Nikitin might have been a French police informant. Indeed, one informant indicated that certain information had been 'transmitted to him by Nikitin'. Marianne Enckell and Rolf Dupuy maintain that it would not be possible to prove this decisively as things stand, although it is particularly suspicious, while the historian Constance Bantman considers Nikitin a good example of an informer fully integrated into anarchist circles—given that he even participated in discussions held on the struggle to be waged against informers within the movement.

== Bibliography ==
- Bantman, Constance (2007), Anarchismes et anarchistes en France et en Grande-Bretagne, 1880-1914 : Échanges, représentations, transferts (PhD thesis), Paris: University Paris XIII
- Bantman, Constance (2013), The French Anarchists in London, 1880–1914 : Exile and Transnationalism in the First Globalisation, Liverpool: Liverpool University Press (LUP), ISBN 978-1-84631-797-2
- Bouhey, Vivien (2008), Les Anarchistes contre la République [The Anarchists against the Republic] (in French), Rennes: Presses universitaires de Rennes (PUR)
- Dupuy, Rolf (2025), NIKITINE Nicolas, Paris: Dictionnaire international des militants anarchistes
- Enckell, Marianne; Dupuy, Rolf (2024), NIKITINE Nicolas, Paris: Le Maitron
- Maitron, Jean (1955), Histoire du mouvement anarchiste en France (1800-1914) (in French), Paris: Histoire du mouvement anarchiste en France, 1880-1914
