= Louise Pioger =

French dressmaker and anarchist songwriter (1848–1920)

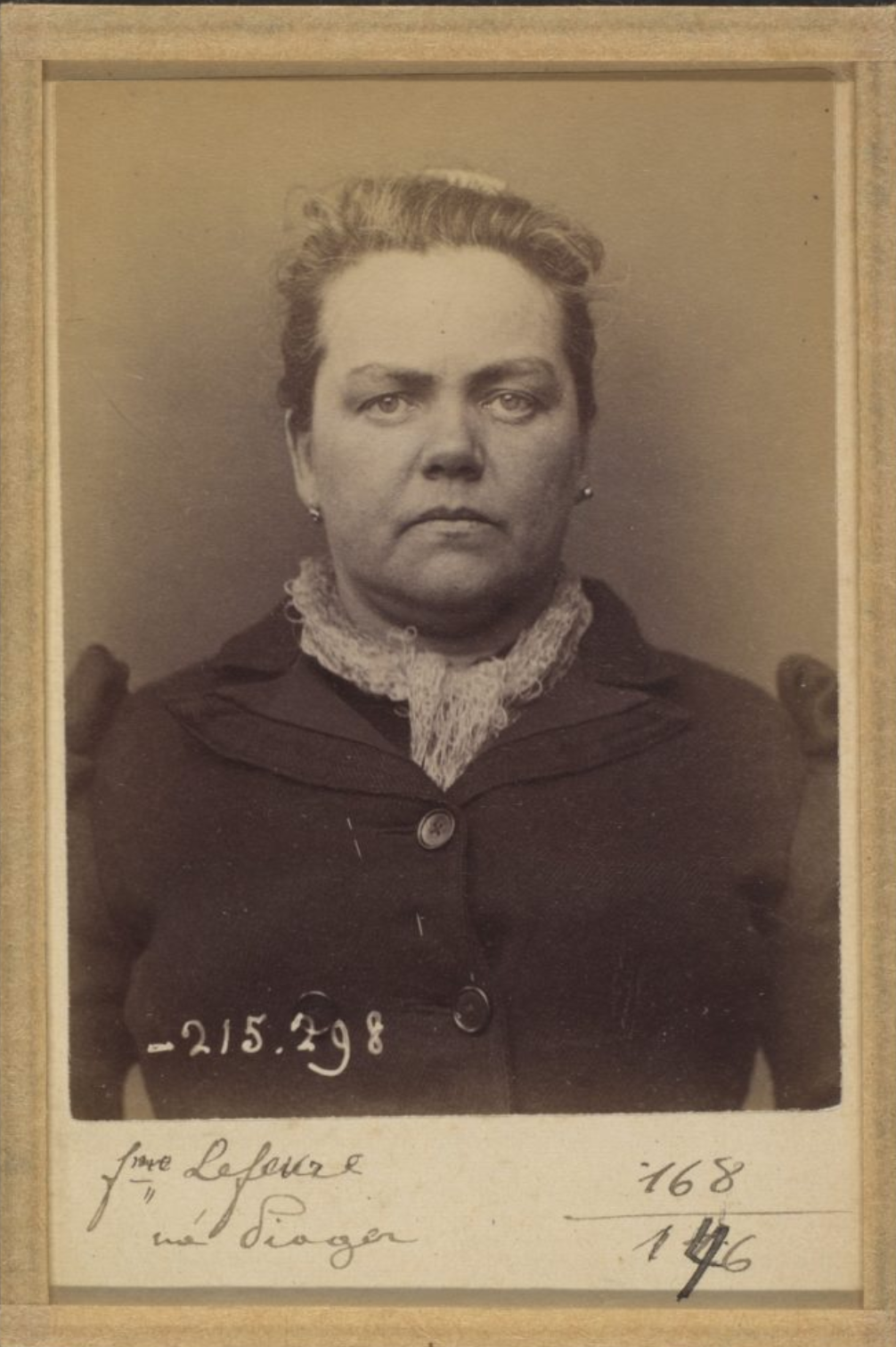
- Pioger's mugshot by Alphonse Bertillon in 1894
- Born: June 19, 1848; Mezières-sous-Ballon, France
- Died: December 9, 1920 (aged 72); Garches
- Other names: Louise Quitrine, Quitrine
- Occupations: Songwriter, seamstress
- Known for: Anarchist activism, Paris Commune
- Partner: Louis Duprat (1890s-?)

Louise Pioger, also known as Louise Quitrime (or Quitrine), was born on June 19, 1848, in Mezières-sous-Ballon, France, and died on December 9, 1920 in Garches. She was a woman laborer in the clothing and textile industry. She made waistcoats and was also an anarchist author and communard active with Women in the Paris Commune. She is known for her nursery rhymes book titled Rondes pour récréations enfantines, which was for a long time wrongly attributed to Louise Michel.

== Biography ==
Pioger was a dressmaker by profession. She made waistcoats. She married Alphonse Pierre Lefèvre, tailor, on January 7, 1868, in Ballon (Sarthe). They had two daughters. Widowed in 1884, Pioger partnered with Louis Duprat, a tailor, and anarchist, who became a wine merchant and barkeeper in Paris on rue Joquelet and then later 11 rue Ramey in the 18th arrondissement in 1893. Pioger became the manager of this cabaret at 11 rue Ramey.

One of her daughters married Benoît Morel, and the other one Jules Lebailleur, both Parisian anarchists. Pioger made no secret of her anarchist beliefs although she believed that they would be created by persuasion rather that militant acts.

The cabaret on rue Ramey was known to be visited by anarchists and was closely monitored by the Paris police. Pioger and Louis Duprat had to go into exile and settled for some time in London, in the Soho district. There again they got close to the anarchist circles of the English capital.

In March 1894, Pioger returned to Paris to take over the management of the cabaret-café, even though the couple had sold the business before leaving for England. As a member of the group Réveil de la femme à Paris, which also included Louise Michel, Pioger was arrested by the police on the evening of March 7 during a raid on the café. Seventeen people and three women were arrested. Pioger was imprisoned in the Saint Lazare prison on the ninth of the same month, before being released on bail on May 2. Imprisoned again for criminal conspiracy, Pioger was finally released on June 25, 1895, by an order of dismissal issued by the investigating judge Meyer.

== Career as an author ==
In 1889, Pioger published a collection of anarchist songs under the pseudonym Louise Quitrime (also spelled Quitrine). She used the tunes sung in schoolyards to convert and seduce the youngest to the anarchist cause. The collection includes a children's carmagnole. One of the songs translates as

Now that we know

That the rich are thieves

We when we grow up

We'll make mincemeat of it.

In addition to this collection of children's songs, Pioger is the author of various plays including Les Communardes, an episode of the Bloody Week.

=== Works ===
- Rondes pour récréations enfantines, Librairie du Père peinard, s.d. [1889], 14 p.
- Les Communardes, épisode de la Semaine sanglante.

== See also ==
- Women in the Paris Commune
- Louise Michel
- Union des femmes pour la défense de Paris et les soins aux blessés
