= The Panther of Batignolles =

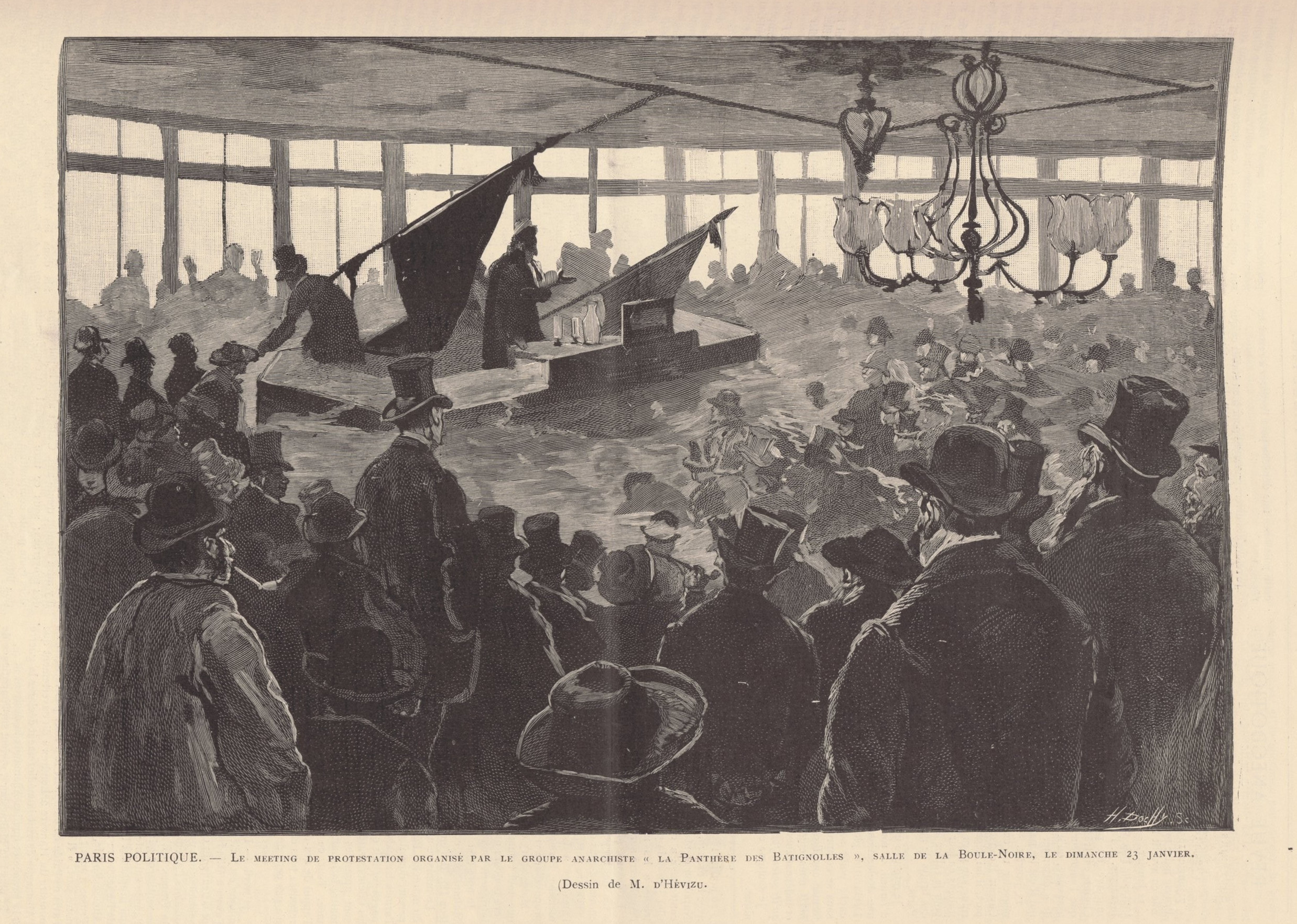
An illustration of The Panther of Batignolles organizing a protest in 1887

The Panther of Batignolles was a group of anarchists in France in the late 19th century. Its members included Clément Duval, Joseph Decker, Nikolai Nikitin or Louis Duprat.

== See also ==
- Anarchism in France
