= Louis Duprat =

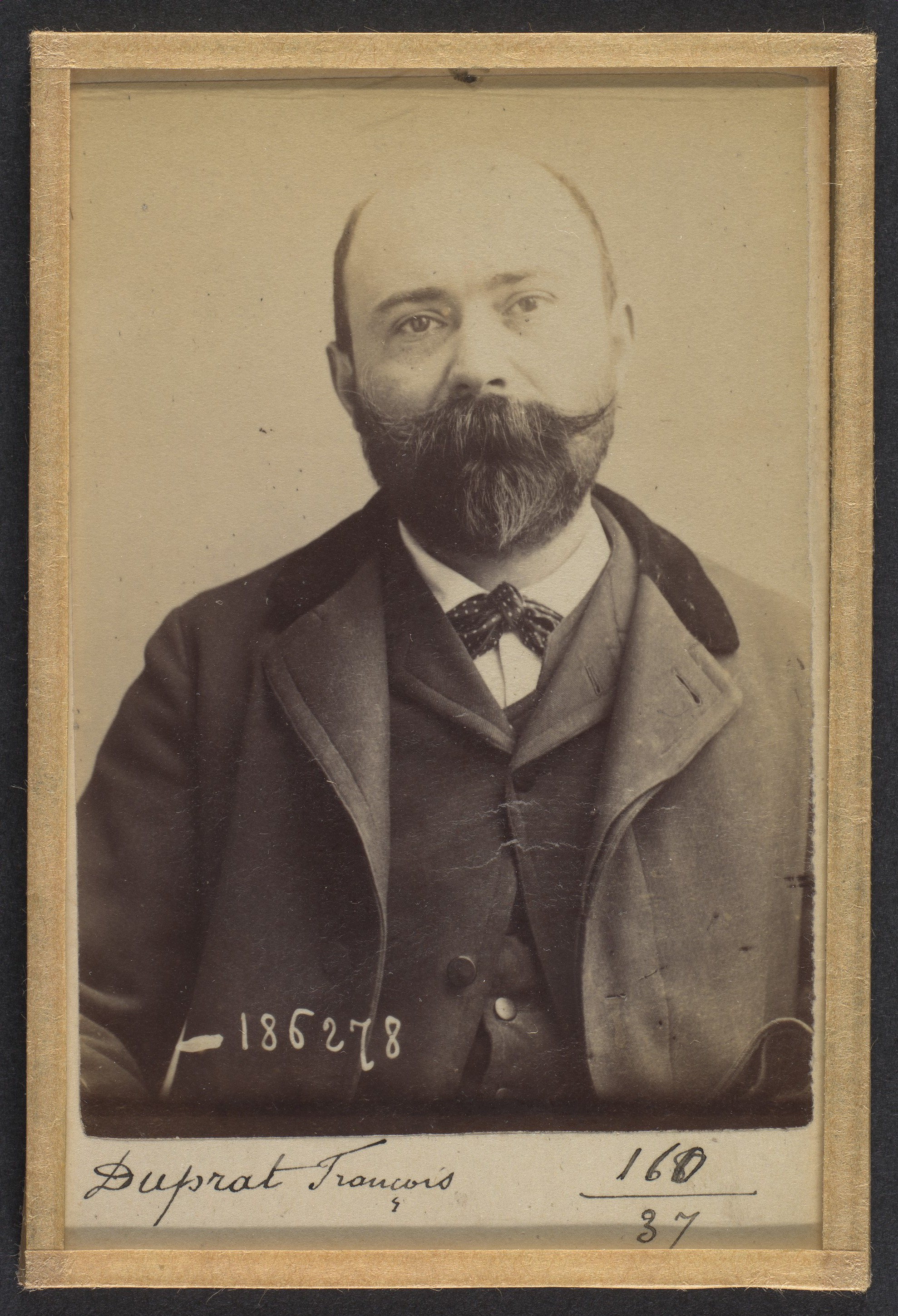
- Louis Duprat's mugshot by Alphonse Bertillon (1894)
- Born: 27 October 1857; Saint-Martin du Gers
- Died: After 1937
- Occupations: tailor, anarchist, syndicalist, wine seller, publicist
- Movement: Anarchism
- Partner: Louise Pioger (1890s-?)

Louis Duprat (1857-after 1937), nicknamed Piloux, was a French tailor, wine merchant, syndicalist and anarchist. Close to Émile Pouget, Louise Michel, and his partner, Louise Pioger, he held a significant position within the Belle Époque anarchist movement, writing for several newspapers, organizing numerous actions, and being targeted in the Trial of the Thirty.

Born in the Gers region, Duprat began working as a tailor and moved to Paris, where he integrated into the anarchist movement and associated with other activists, such as Louise Michel and Émile Pouget. A member of many groups, such as The Panther of Batignolles, Duprat contributed to a number of newspapers, raised funds to launch La Vengeance Anarchiste, and became involved with Louise Duval, Clément Duval's wife, in assisting deportees to the penal colonies, such as Vittorio Pini. He generally defended positions similar to Pouget's within the groups he participated in. From 1890, Duprat purchased a wine shop, which quickly became a gathering place for anarchists in France.

He was targeted by the Trial of the Thirty in 1894, sentenced to twenty years of penal colony deportation in absentia while he was in the United Kingdom with Pioger. He then returned to France a few months later when the repression had lessened. Having appealed his conviction, he was acquitted.

His police photograph is part of the Metropolitan Museum of Art (MET) collections.

== Biography ==
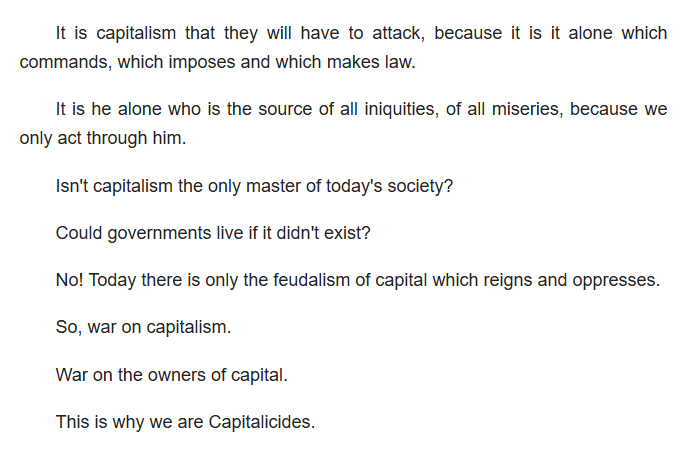
Extract of anonymous 'The Capitalicide' article in La Vengeance Anarchiste - 1883

François Louis Duprat was born in Saint-Martin du Gers on 27 October 1857. According to his birth certificate, he was the son of Julie Marie Salles and Simon Duprat, a ploughman.

He worked as a tailor and joined the anarchist movement in Paris. In June 1882, he founded an anarchist group there called L'Aiguille ('The Needle') with other members of the tailors' union, which was exclusively anarchist at the time. The first secretary of this group was Louise Michel. This group, which also included figures like Émile Pouget, was involved in every possible demonstration and social struggle from its inception.

Duprat joined The Panther of Batignolles and La Sentinelle Révolutionnaire during this period. In 1883, he was appointed treasurer, responsible for receiving donations from companions to establish the newspaper La Vengeance Anarchiste.

In 1884, he helped incite unemployed workers and was one of the main contributors to Terre et Liberté ('Land and Liberty') with Antoine Rieffel. This anarchist-communist publication was quickly prosecuted for "incitement to looting", and Rieffel-Duprat replaced it with L'Audace (Audacity) before Rieffel was sentenced to two years in prison.

The following year, Duprat gained attention for distributing issues of the Brussels newspaper Ni Dieu, ni Maître (Neither God, Nor Master) at meetings. Police suspected him of being one of the authors of L'Action, a brochure he allegedly contributed to, which was a manual for making explosives.

Duprat was among the founders of the Ligue des Antipatriotes. He was involved with both the International Anarchist Circle and the group La Sentinelle (The Sentinel), where he attended with his wife. In 1888, he was accused of failing to send due sums to Clément Duval and Antoine Cyvoct. Within the International Anarchist Circle, he aligned with Pouget's views and supported the actions of anarchists within trade unions.

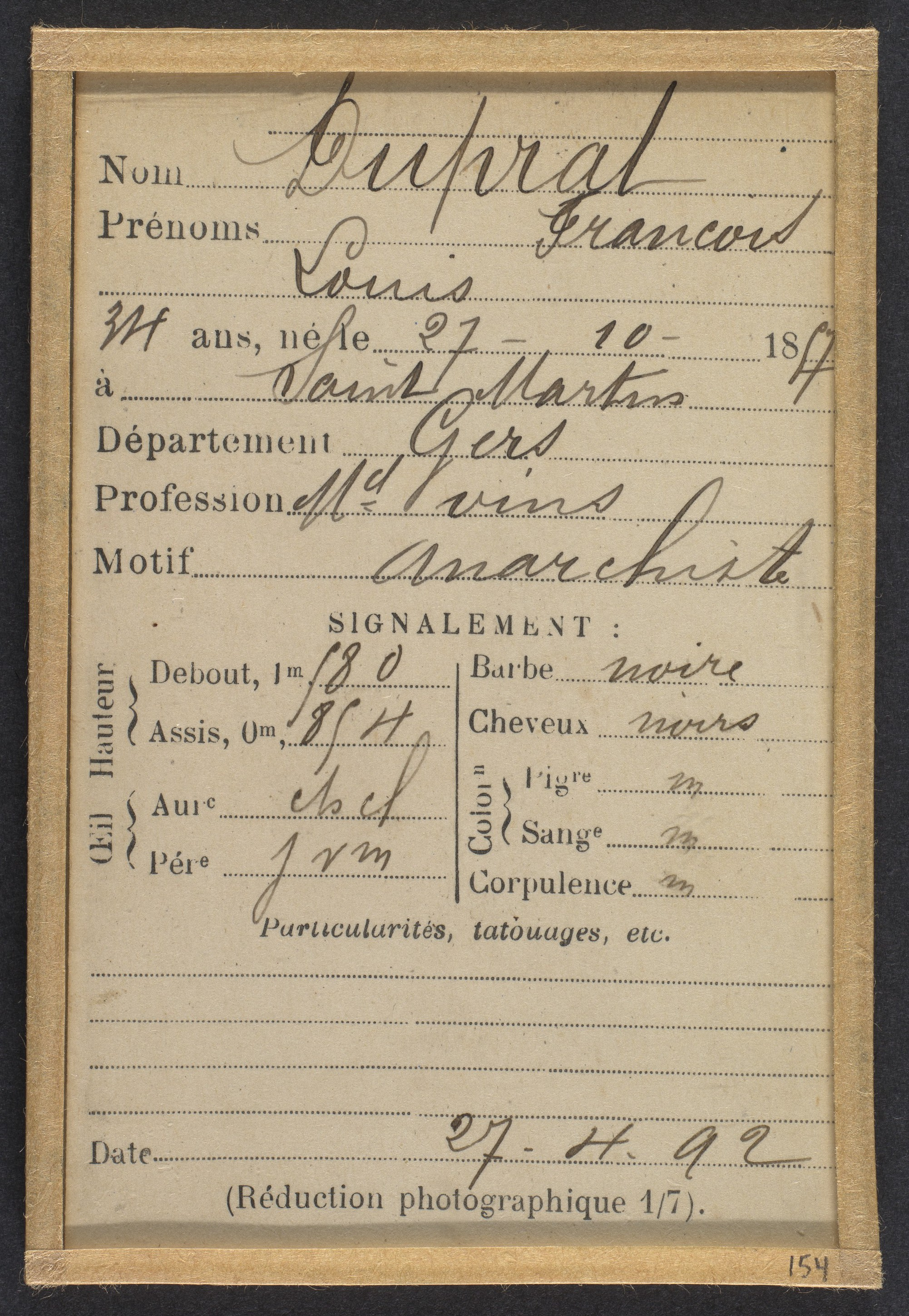
File on Duprat by Alphonse Bertillon (1894)

He re-established La Sentinelle after some time, with anarchist Louise Duval (Clément's wife) being one of its attendees. Their group was renamed Les anarchistes de Montmartre because a Boulangist group had adopted the same name. Among other things, they sought to organize evenings to support anarchists deported to penal colonies, such as Vittorio Pini. He also belonged to the group Les Dynamiteurs ('The Dynamiters') during this period.

From 1890, he set up a wine business at 11 rue Ramey, which became a gathering place for anarchist companions.

He was "preventively" arrested before 1 May 1892, like many other anarchists in France. His home was raided during the repression of January and February 1894, and he decided to go into exile in the United Kingdom with his partner, the anarchist Louise Piogier.

=== Trial of the Thirty ===
While in exile with Pouget, Duprat was brought to trial during the Trial of the Thirty. This political trial targeted thirty prominent anarchist figures in France and was designed to be a condemnation following the assassination of Sadi Carnot by Sante Caserio. Authorities mixed illegalists from the Ortiz gang with well-known anarchists like Duprat. Despite being accused of criminal association with people he had never even met, he was still sentenced in absentia to twenty years of penal colony deportation.

However, the jurors acquitted most of the defendants, and the repressive climate targeting anarchists began to change. As a result, Duprat returned to France the following year, determined to appeal his conviction. He was arrested immediately upon his arrival in Paris while on his way to see Sébastien Faure on 4 March 1895 ; he was subsequently acquitted. Police records continued to list him as an anarchist until at least 1901-1912. He is indicated as alive in the death certificate of his late wife, in 1937.

== Legacy ==
=== Police mugshot ===
His police mugshot is part of the Metropolitan Museum of Art (MET) collections.

== Bibliography ==
- Bach Jensen, Richard (2015). The Battle against Anarchist Terrorism: An International History, 1878–1934. Cambridge: Cambridge University Press (CUP). ISBN 978-1-107-03405-1.
- Dupuy, Rolf; Davranche, Guillaume (2024), DUPRAT Louis [François, Louis], Paris: Le Maitron
- Dupuy, Rolf (2025), "DUPRAT, Louis, François "PAUL" ; "PILOUX"", Dictionnaire international des militants anarchistes, Paris
