= La Vengeance Anarchiste =

French anarchist newspaper (1883)

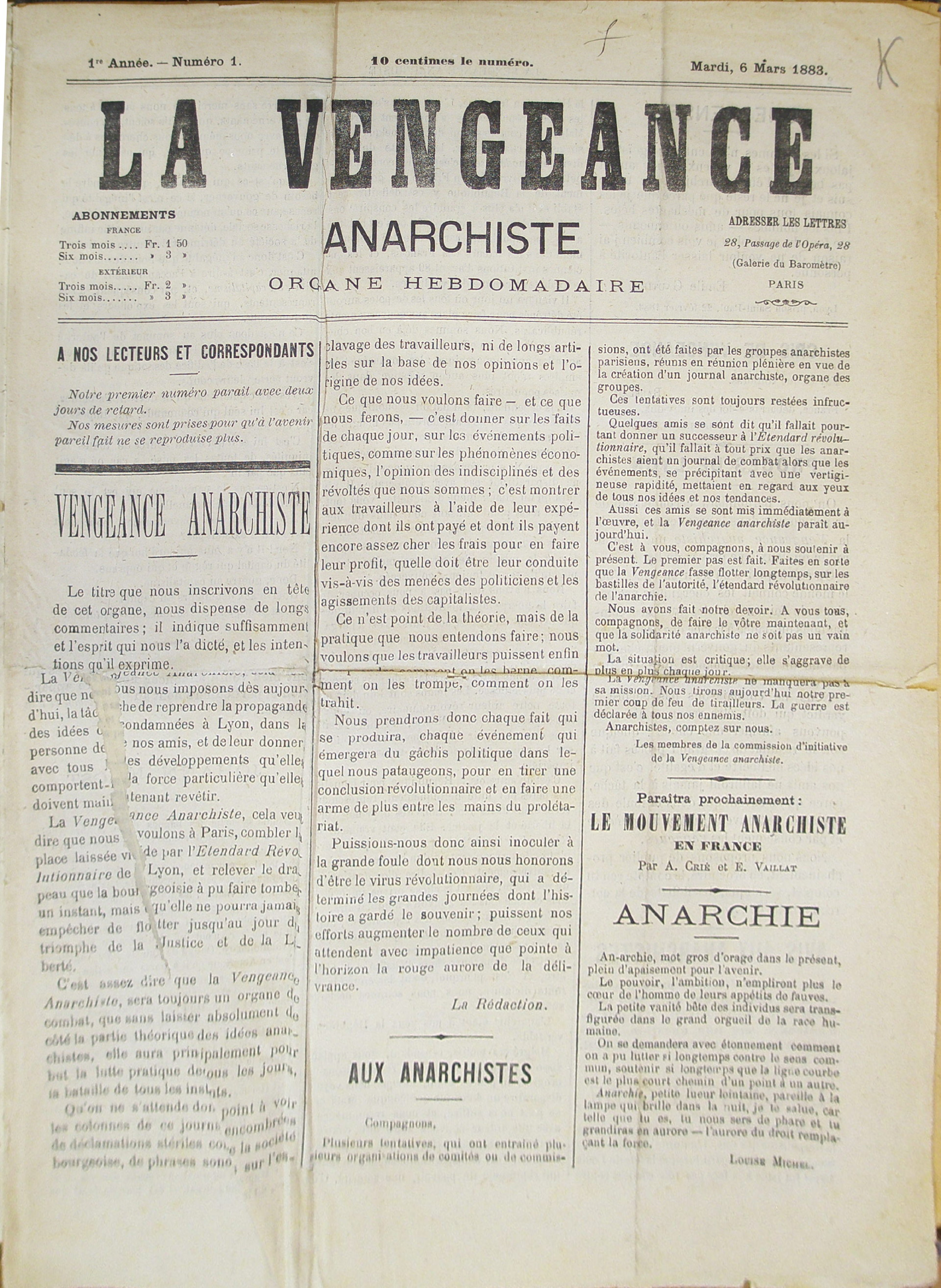
- Front page of the first issue of La Vengeance anarchiste (6 March 1883)
- Founder(s): Louise Michel; Émile Gautier; Marguerite Leloup
- Founded: 1883
- Ceased publication: 1883
- Political alignment: Anarchism
- Language: French
- Headquarters: Paris

La Vengeance Anarchiste ('The Anarchist Vengeance') was an anarchist newspaper published in the early part of 1883 by various anarchists. This paper, presented as the successor to L'Étendard révolutionnaire ('The Revolutionary Standard'), brought together figures such as Louise Michel and Émile Gautier. It ceased publication after its second issue.

In its first issue, Marguerite Leloup published a notable article on women and the anarchist struggle.

== History ==
=== La Vengeance Anarchiste ===
La Vengeance Anarchiste was founded in March 1883 in Paris by a group of anarchists. The newspaper presented itself as the successor to L'Étendard révolutionnaire from Lyon. It was published for only two issues before ceasing publication. The only signed articles in the paper were by Louise Michel, Émile Gautier, and Marguerite Leloup. Louis Duprat was in charge of receiving the funds destined to create the publication.

This publication is notable as one of the rare political publications in history to embrace the term "vengeance" with a positive connotation. René Bianco, a historian of the anarchist press, specifically highlighted the articles on Johann Most and La femme anarchiste ('The anarchist woman') by Marguerite Leloup.

=== La femme anarchiste ===
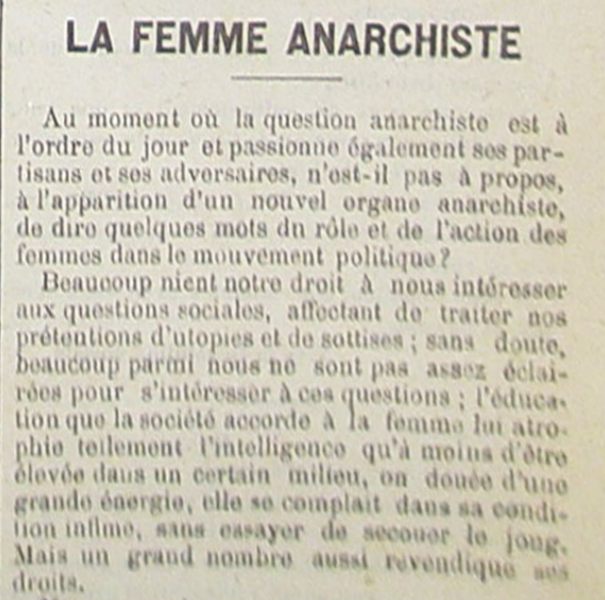
Beginning of 'The anarchist woman' article by Marguerite Leloup in La Vengeance anarchiste (6 March 1883)

In her thesis on women anarchists from this period, historian Marie-Pierre Tardif notes that Leloup's text is one of the first anarchist texts written by a woman anarchist who was not Louise Michel. Furthermore, in this article, Leloup highlighted several elements that Tardif points out, such as her mention of the differentiated place of women within anarchist circles of the period.

Tardif observes that Leloup highlights how "the role of women remains limited due to gender prejudices that exclude them from politics", and also that women are less educated than men, which places them in a situation of intellectual inferiority. However, Leloup doesn't resign herself to this situation and argues that several anarchists are demanding their rights and a place within the movement. From the author's perspective, the "anarchist woman" is presented as "an activist who engages alongside men in the revolutionary struggle while seeking to improve her own social situation".

== Works ==
- Collections from the archive site Archives Anarchistes that they shared to Commons, covering the first and only issue. Transliteration of all newspaper articles available on Wikisource (French original).

== Bibliography ==
- Bourdin, Jean-Claude (2010). Faire justice soi-même : Études sur la vengeance [To take justice into one's own hands: Studies on vengeance] (PDF) (in French). Rennes: Presses Universitaires de Rennes (PUR).
- Tardif, Marie-Pier (2021), Ni ménagères, ni courtisanes. Les femmes de lettres dans la presse anarchiste française (1885-1905) (PhD thesis) [Neither housewives nor courtesans. Women writers in the French anarchist press (1885-1905)] (PDF)
