= Cérans-Foulletourte =

French village

- Commune
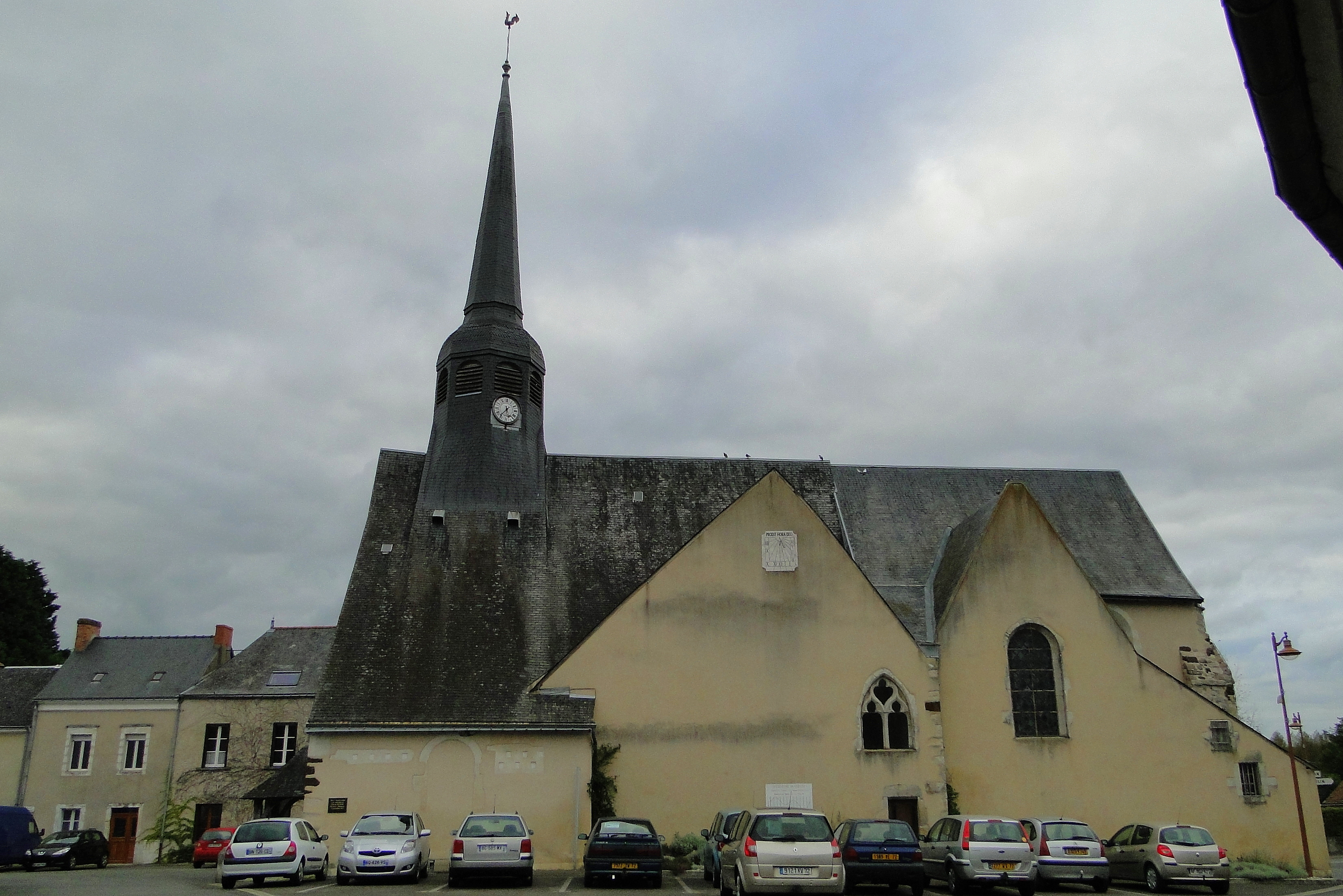
- The church of Notre-Dame de Cérans

- Coat of arms
- Location of Cérans-Foulletourte
- Location within France Location within Pays de la Loire
- Coordinates: 47°49′38″N 0°04′30″E
- Country: France
- Region: Pays de la Loire
- Department: Sarthe
- Arrondissement: La Flèche
- Canton: Le Lude
- Intercommunality: Val de Sarthe

Government
  - Mayor (2020–2026): Elisabeth Moussay
- Area^{1}: 32.52 km^{2} (12.56 sq mi)
- Population (2023): 3,341
  - Density: 102.7/km^{2} (266.1/sq mi)
- Demonym(s): Céranais-Foulletourtois, Céranaises-Foulletourtoise
- Time zone: UTC+01:00 (CET)
  - Summer (DST): UTC+02:00 (CEST)
- INSEE/Postal code: 72051 /72330
- ^{1} French Land Register data, which excludes lakes, ponds, glaciers > 1 km^{2} (0.386 sq mi or 247 acres) and river estuaries.

Cérans-Foulletourte is a commune in the Sarthe department in the region of Pays de la Loire in north-western France.

The township has been twinned with Chapel St Leonards in Lincolnshire, England since 1998.

== Population ==
Historical population
Year	Pop.	±% p.a.
1968	1,738	—
1975	2,014	+2.13%
1982	2,226	+1.44%
1990	2,296	+0.39%
1999	2,445	+0.70%
2007	3,077	+2.92%
2012	3,280	+1.29%
2017	3,375	+0.57%
2023	3,341	−0.17%
Source: INSEE

== See also ==
- Communes of the Sarthe department
