= Mézières-sur-Ponthouin =

- Commune
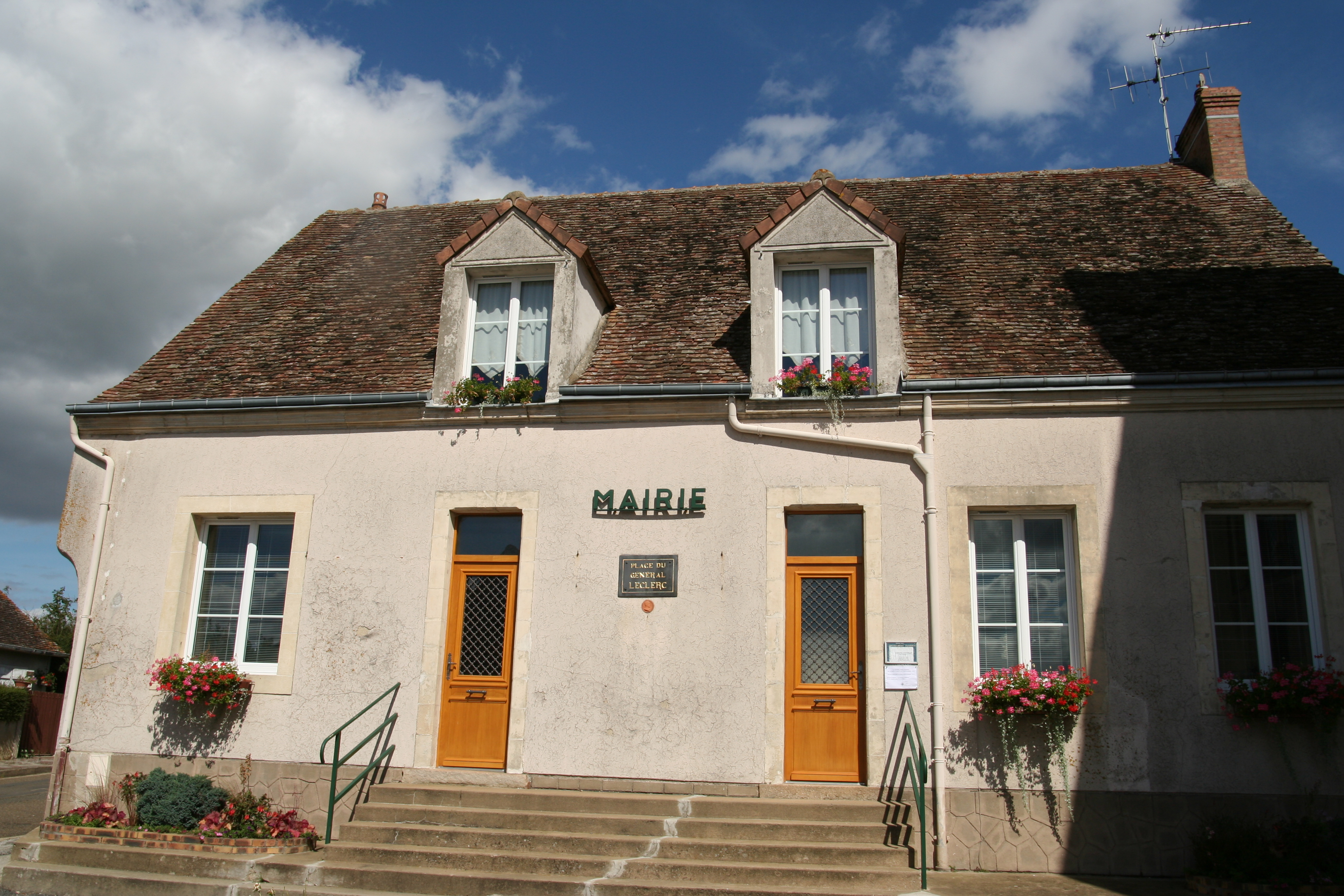
- The town hall of Mézières-sur-Ponthouin
- Location of Mézières-sur-Ponthouin
- Location within France Location within Pays de la Loire
- Coordinates: 48°11′37″N 0°18′02″E
- Country: France
- Region: Pays de la Loire
- Department: Sarthe
- Arrondissement: Mamers
- Canton: Mamers
- Intercommunality: Maine Saosnois

Government
  - Mayor (2020–2026): Guy Cosme
- Area^{1}: 17.88 km^{2} (6.90 sq mi)
- Highest elevation: 131 m (430 ft)
- Lowest elevation: 55 m (180 ft)
- Population (2023): 725
  - Density: 40.5/km^{2} (105/sq mi)
- Time zone: UTC+01:00 (CET)
  - Summer (DST): UTC+02:00 (CEST)
- INSEE/Postal code: 72196 /72290
- ^{1} French Land Register data, which excludes lakes, ponds, glaciers > 1 km^{2} (0.386 sq mi or 247 acres) and river estuaries.

Mézières-sur-Ponthouin (French pronunciation: [mezjɛʁ syʁ pɔ̃twɛ̃]) is a commune in the Sarthe department in the region of Pays de la Loire in north-western France.

== See also ==
- Communes of the Sarthe department
