= Clément Duval =

French anarchist (1850–1935), founder of illegalism

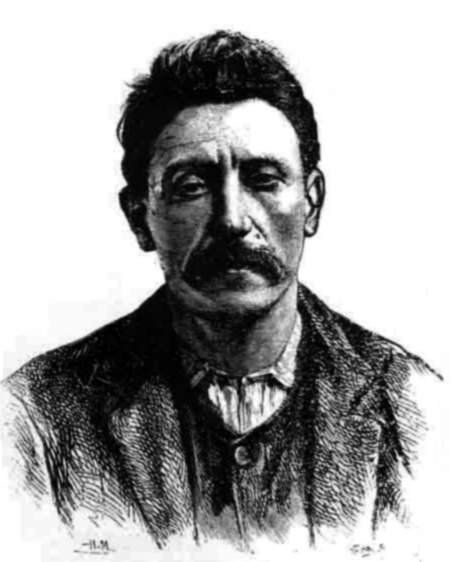
- Born: 11 March 1850; Cérans-Foulletourte, France
- Died: 29 March 1935 (aged 85); New York City, U.S.
- Movement: Anarchism; Illegalism
- Criminal charges: Theft, arson, robberies, assault
- Criminal penalty: Sentenced to death, commuted to life in penal labour

Clément Duval (French: [klemɑ̃ dyval]; 1850–1935) was a French anarchist. He is best known as a proponent of propaganda of the deed and the principal founder of illegalism, an anarchist tendency that he extensively inspired, practiced, and theorized.

Born into a modest socialist family, he fought in the Franco-Prussian War and was severely wounded; after years of bedridden suffering, he was left impoverished and unfit for work. He began stealing to support his family. Duval was arrested and imprisoned for a year, during which time he became an anarchist and was politicized. Upon his release, he became actively involved in anarchist militancy and was imprisoned again, this time for a few weeks. After his release, the anarchist joined The Panther of Batignolles and began a series of arson attacks targeting the properties of business owners. He also prepared explosives to launch a series of bombings in the capital but was arrested after burglarizing and setting fire to the home of Madeleine Lemaire.

During his trial, which influenced many contemporary or later anarchists such as Louise Michel, Vittorio Pini or the Bonnot Gang, Duval notably theorized the idea of individual reclamation—stealing from bourgeois targets to redistribute wealth. His positions and defenses have led many to consider him the father of illegalism, a particularly significant tendency of anarchism in Western Europe.

Sentenced to death, his punishment was commuted to life at hard labor, and he was deported to the penal colony of the Salvation Islands, where he remained for 13 years until he managed to escape—on his eighteenth attempt. Duval then fled to the United States, where he died in 1935. His life and legend inspired cultural works, such as Papillon by Henri Charrière, a depoliticized version of his life in the penal colony.

== Biography ==
=== Youth and war injuries ===
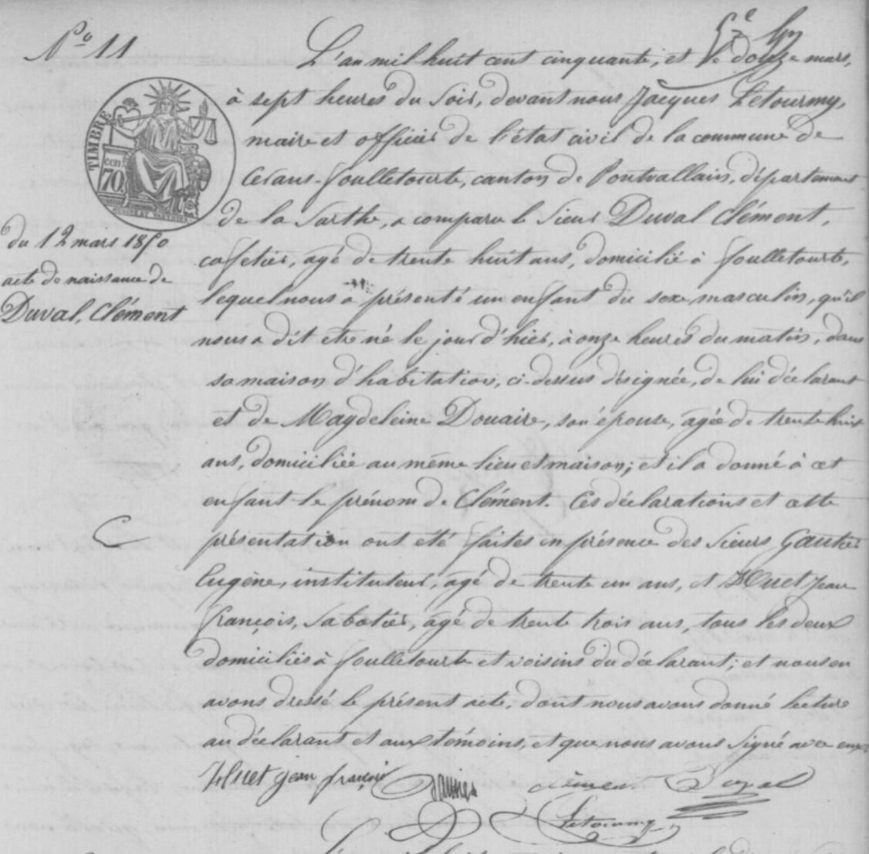
Clément Duval's birth certificate in the Archives départementales de la Sarthe. 11 March 1850.

Clément Louis Duval was born on 11 March 1850 in Cérans-Foulletourte. According to his birth certificate, he was the son of Clément Duval Senior, a café owner, and Madeleine Douaire, who was unemployed. His father was a staunch Blanquist and a fervent republican during the Second Empire. He provided his son with a socialist education, having him read texts by Blanqui, for example.

During his late adolescence, he fell in love with a comrade from a Bonapartist family and started a household with her. However, the Franco-Prussian War broke out, and he was conscripted. Influenced by his socialist upbringing and antimilitarism, he was reluctant to fight and considered deserting. His father and his partner had to convince him, with difficulty, to report to Rennes to join the 5th battalion of chasseurs on foot (bataillon de chasseurs à pied).

After joining the battalion, he contracted smallpox during the epidemic that ravaged the French troops and was sent to the hospital to recover. Once he had recovered, he was transferred to the 11th of chasseurs on foot and joined the front lines.

He fought bravely during the skirmishes around Villorceau in early December 1870. On 11 December 1870, he was struck by a bullet, and later the same day, an exploding shell severely wounded him. Duval was evacuated by an ambulance and sent to Nantes. He managed to survive and heal from his injuries, but from that war onward, he suffered from severe rheumatism and arthritis.

Reintegrated, he was stationed with his regiment in Sathonay-Camp until 1873. When he returned to Paris, after the siege of the city and the Paris Commune, his father had died, and his former partner, whom he still loved, was in a relationship with someone else, with whom she had a child—who was stillborn. Duval understood her decision, especially since she had to survive the siege and the Commune without him, and he did not blame her; however, he felt ashamed of his own situation and refused to speak to her. Fourteen months later, he finally decided to see her again, and the two reconciled.

Clément and his partner were then in love and enjoyed happier days following their reunion. In 1876, however, a severe episode of rheumatism struck the young man, requiring six months of hospital treatment and another month bedridden at home. This prolonged unemployment weighed heavily on the family's already meager finances, especially as he returned to the hospital for arthritis treatment and she had to be hospitalized during a difficult pregnancy.

After recovering from his convalescence, he was dismissed from his job as a metalworker and had to look for new work.

=== First thefts and imprisonment ===
At the end of September 1878, while searching for a job, he went to the metalworking workshops of Maison Fleury, but was turned away. He then decided to take the train to Rue de Vaugirard and visit Maison Moisant, as he had been told they were hiring. Duval needed to be in Vaugirard before 1 P.M., but when he entered the station at 11. A.M., the train he needed had already left. He decided to take the next train anyway, just in case. As he approached the ticket counter to purchase a new ticket, he noticed the counter was unattended, and the day's earnings were left out in plain view. After hesitating, Duval grabbed the money he saw in two bowls and stuffed it into his pockets before returning home. He stole a total of 82 francs. Upon returning to his family, he claimed that an old friend, moved by their dire situation, had given them the money.

He continued searching for work, taking odd jobs here and there, but was rarely hired due to his weakened physical state—his work certificates held little sway with employers. Some time later, Duval decided to repeat the same theft, but in a more organized manner; he brought a bag to carry off as much money as possible and returned at a time when the ticket counter was unattended. He took all the money he could find and fled. A man saw him, raised the alarm, and began chasing him—soon, a crowd of around fifty people joined the pursuit as Duval ran across the tracks. He climbed over a wall, but on the other side, he was immediately apprehended by the gendarmes.

Before the court, he claimed that he had only wanted to feed his family. He was sentenced to one year in prison and incarcerated in Mazas. Since he was unmarried, his partner could not visit him, and instead, he received visits from his mother, who scolded him for ending up in prison and had never really shown him much affection. Duval sought early release for good behavior and eagerly awaited his release date, as his mother had promised a family gathering to celebrate his freedom. Released on 29 July 1879, Duval rushed home, expecting to be 'surprised' by the celebration—only to find the place empty.

His partner had left with their child four days earlier, as he learned from the concierge—she had resolved to leave him out of shame for his criminal record and had returned to her family. Duval returned to his bed and reportedly broke down in tears.

=== Political awakening and anarchism ===
In parallel, Clément Duval read extensively from Enlightenment philosophers during his incarceration, spending a significant portion of his prison time studying these texts and educating himself. Upon his release, he began associating with workers’ groups, then reading anarchist newspapers. Eventually, he decided to attend meetings of anarchist groups in the capital, where he never spoke and only observed the debates.

Duval was struck by the contrast between the words of the anarchists he listened to—who often echoed Proudhon's phrase 'Property is theft!'—and their actions. None of these meetings seemed to challenge the bourgeois order; they were merely empty words for him. One day, Duval intervened during a meeting and delivered his first speech, in which he declared, among other things:

Let us procure the means to nourish and spread this revolt. These means, after careful consideration, can only be provided by the coffers of the bourgeoisie, whose weekly obituaries you regularly draft—without ever disturbing their digestion. [...] Theft cannot be the ultimate goal of our complex action, nor a doctrine, nor a principle. I know that if Rothschild's property were to become mine tomorrow, no revolution would have been achieved: property would not have been outraged or diminished, only transferred—which is of little significance. [... W]e cannot think of expropriating others to enjoy for ourselves, of taking the means by which we are exploited only to become exploiters in turn. But if, in these partial expropriations, we find the means to support the revolutionary action that condemns and seeks to abolish all forms of exploitation, I believe even the most scrupulous conscience can be at peace.

His speech was met with general indifference. Afterward, Duval refrained from speaking out, not wanting to be seen as a police informant by appearing too extreme, and to avoid facing such a cold reception again—he was deeply disappointed by what he saw among his anarchists companions. He never spoke of his conviction at the time, fearing exclusion from the groups he associated with.

=== 1880–1883 ===
Clément Duval managed to find work again as a metalworker, this time at the Tchouberski workshops, where he manufactured stoves. He became friends with several colleagues and often visited the family of his forge companion, Boucart. At Boucart's home, he delivered passionate speeches and was well-regarded by his friends. Despite having promised himself never to engage with a woman again, he entered a new relationship in 1880 with a partner ten years his junior. The couple attended anarchist meetings together, lived in a free union, and were both active in the movement.

In September 1881, however, she returned to her family as she did every summer to help with the grape harvest. Meanwhile, Duval fell seriously ill once more. He went to Beaujon Hospital but was only kept for a day without receiving treatment. He then tried Lariboisière Hospital, where he was redirected to Hôtel-Dieu, and once again sent back to Beaujon. There, a compassionate on-call doctor arranged a bed for him in a hallway.

The next day, the attending physician was displeased that a patient had been admitted without his approval and scolded Duval. He remained bedridden for two months and needed crutches afterward, but he continued spreading anarchist newspapers within the hospital, thanks to his partner who managed to pass them to him through the night nurse. As soon as he was able to leave, he made clear his disdain for such hospitals and departed.

After speaking at a meeting to support a fellow companion calling for action, Duval was suspected of being a police informant. However, a few companions approached him at the end of the meeting and suggested he join the 'Panther of Batignolles', a more radical group inclined toward direct action.

Clément Duval and his new partner were married in a civil ceremony, but their relationship grew increasingly strained. As he became more deeply involved in anarchist activism, she urged him to be careful and focus instead on providing for the family. When Louise Michel and Émile Pouget organized a popular uprising in Paris, advocating for 'expropriation' from Parisian bakers in protest of bread prices, Duval received an urgent telegram from his brother-in-law, summoning him immediately. When he arrived, he realized it was a ruse. Returning to Paris, he arrived too late to participate in the events. During this period, Duval and his wife argued fiercely, and he even went so far as to beat her on multiple occasions.

=== 'Property arsons' ===
The anarchist clandestinely printed posters and pasted them on the walls of Parisian industries. The posters were highly radical, with messages such as:

Fire to the despicable exploiters! Fire to the priests of order! The same fire will engulf them, the same sky will cover them.

Duval then embarked on an extensive arson campaign, targeting any factory or industry whose owner he deemed deserving of ruin. A few days later, he set fire to a piano company. He continued relentlessly, next targeting the depots of the Bastille-Saint-Ouen Omnibus Company, where firefighters struggled for twelve hours before extinguishing the blaze. He then set fire to a carpentry workshop owned by the Rothschild family—flames spread so rapidly that the premises of an adjacent carpet business were also destroyed. Though he had previously spared the forage stores of the Omnibus Company, he returned one night and burned down all the warehouses.

A few days later, Duval set fire to the Tchouberski factory, then the Belvallette Frères carriage factory in Passy—two businesses where he had worked. In the latter case, he intended to kill the owner and foremen, who lived on-site, but was prevented from accessing the varnish storage area where he had planned to start the blaze. Forced to ignite the fire elsewhere, the targets managed to escape the burning building and survive.

His final target in this series was the Bazar de l'Hôtel de Ville (BHV), whose owner, Ruel, was reputed to be a harsh and greedy man. The anarchist placed an incendiary device after the store's closing, but the fire failed to ignite. Strangely, neither the press nor the police mentioned the incident.

=== Conflict with the Mathérion, arrest ===
Duval paused his arson campaign to engage in more 'traditional' anarchist propaganda. Living at 168 Rue Ordener, he began to stir unrest among the workers at the Mathérion family's factory across from his home—a business known for prohibiting unionized labor. This led to a cat-and-mouse game between the factory foremen and Duval, who often met the workers at the local bar, encouraging them to disobey orders.

One evening, after the factory owners called the police to force the workers back to their posts, Duval confronted the officers, declaring their orders illegitimate and telling them to 'go fuck' themselves. He was arrested for contempt, and during a search of his room, police discovered banned anarchist newspapers. However, the assistant of Tchouberski, who held Duval in high regard, interceded on his behalf. As a result, Duval was sentenced to just forty-eight hours in prison and a five-franc fine, in addition to the two weeks he had already spent in pre-trial detention.

Upon returning home, he told his partner that he regretted bringing her only suffering, anxiety, and pain. Acknowledging their mutual unhappiness, they decided to separate.

During his time in prison, Duval realized the police had been called by the Mathérion family, and he resolved to take revenge. This decision may have contributed to his separation, as he preferred to act alone without worrying about his partner's safety. Immediately after his release, he visited a fellow anarchist to acquire dynamite cartridges. Unfortunately for his plans, lacking the skills to handle explosives, the bomb he planted behind the Mathérion factory fizzled out without exploding—much to his frustration.

=== Terrorism, theft, arrest ===
He decided to find someone who could help him make explosives and received support from anarchist Émile Digeon, a former republican who had participated in the 1848 Revolution and the Narbonne Commune. Digeon, more willing to assist than the anarchist companions of Duval's generation, offered his help while advising him to remain as discreet as possible and gather significant funds to finance his terrorist activities, ensuring preparedness for any eventuality.

Gradually, Duval and a few members of the Panther of Batignolles group created dozens of bombs, intending to place them in strategic locations to target either factory owners or the police. This was in response to police préfet Ernest Taylor's decision to ban red flags in the capital during the commemoration of the Semaine sanglante ('Bloody Week').

When the bombs were ready, Duval and a few comrades burglarized the home of Madeleine Lemaire, who was away on holiday at Château de Lunéville. They stole tens of thousands of francs, including jewelry, silverware, and valuable objects. The group also slashed paintings with knives before setting fire to the apartment and fleeing the scene.

Duval was quickly found by the police after investigators traced one of the stolen jewels. Brigadier Gustave-Amand Rossignol was assigned to arrest him and tried to seize him. Duval then stabbed Rossignol eight times in the ensuing struggle and, failing to kill him, attempted to gouge out his eye with his thumb while holding his head. The policeman was gravely wounded, and Duval was subdued by twenty other officers who rushed to the scene.

=== Trial and founding act of illegalism ===
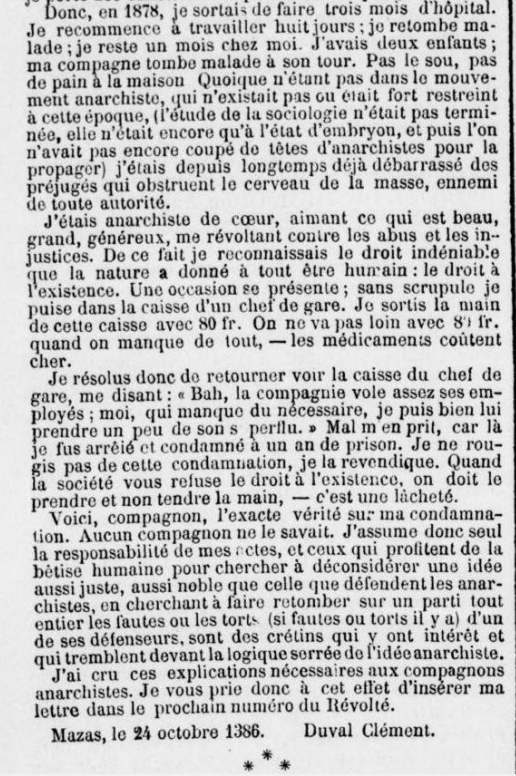
Clement Duval's letter to Le Révolté, where he explains his first conviction for theft to his fellow anarchist companions, Le Révolté (12 November 1886) (in English on Wikisource)

Duval's arrest brought great fame to Lemaire, who received more visitors at her home and became a 'sensation' in the bourgeois circles of the capital. While imprisoned, he wrote to Le Révolté to publicly disclose his prior conviction to anarchists and explain what drove him to theft on such an occasion.

According to the Chief of Sûreté at the time, Marie-François Goron, he met him and during their discussions, Duval stared at him, refusing to lower his eyes, saying that 'an anarchist does not lower his eyes before a commissaire', and then expounded illegalist theories to him. Thus, he reportedly declared to Goron:

I am not a thief — the thieves are the rich. Nature, in creating man, gives him the right to existence. If, therefore, society does not provide him with the means to subsist, the human being can legitimately take what he needs where there is superfluous. That is what I did. When I appear before the jurors, they will quickly realize that they have before them not a wrongdoer, but a convinced anarchist who committed the alleged crimes he is accused of out of principle.

He appeared on 11 January 1887 before the Seine Assize Court and was defended by Fernand Labori, the future lawyer of Vittorio Pini, Auguste Vaillant, and Émile Zola. From the opening of his trial, his first statement reflected the illegalist ideology he championed—the idea that revolutionary banditry was a legitimate means to wage anarchist struggle.

Duval theorised the practice of individual reclamation—the theft from bourgeois targets to redistribute wealth—for four main reasons: it would directly address economic inequality through force, terrorise the bourgeoisie, pedagogically spread anarchist ideas on property, and prepare and incite the population to rise up for revolution.

During his trial, Gaston Laurent-Atthalin, a judge whom Ravachol would later appreciate during his own trial, arranged a confrontation between Rossignol, the wounded policeman, and Duval. The officer held no grudge for Duval's actions and understood that he had acted to preserve his freedom. The two shook hands at the end of their meeting.

Duval used his trial as a platform for his ideas; he engaged in near-feminist rhetoric, declaring, for example, that 'the exploitation of man by man is nothing compared to that of woman'. He framed theft within the broader class struggle and justified it by the natural right to existence—he had needed to steal to eat, and that was why he began stealing—as part of his defence.

His trial, along with Pini's two years later, launched the practice of outlaw justice, and from these cases, the trend continued in French anarchist circles up to the Bonnot Gang. Jean-Marc Delpech noted that during his trial, Duval fully owned his actions, like other anarchist figures of the time, particularly Vittorio Pini or Émile Henry. For all these reasons, it can be considered the founding act of illegalism.

His trial marked a rift among French anarchists; older figures in the movement, such as Jean Grave, editor-in-chief of Le Révolté, categorically rejected illegalism as legitimate. However, Grave made an exception for Duval, the first in the line of anarchist thieves, because of his extreme poverty—he was far harsher toward later illegalists. He also spread false rumours against political opponents like Albert Libertad, suggesting he was a police informant. Thus, the illegalism Duval founded at this moment was far from unanimous among anarchists, though a significant number supported the ideology.

Duval was sentenced to death. He bore no ill will toward his lawyer, whom he believed had done good work despite not being an anarchist. He also held no resentment toward the prosecutor, stating that he had merely acted in accordance with his role.

=== Bagne ===
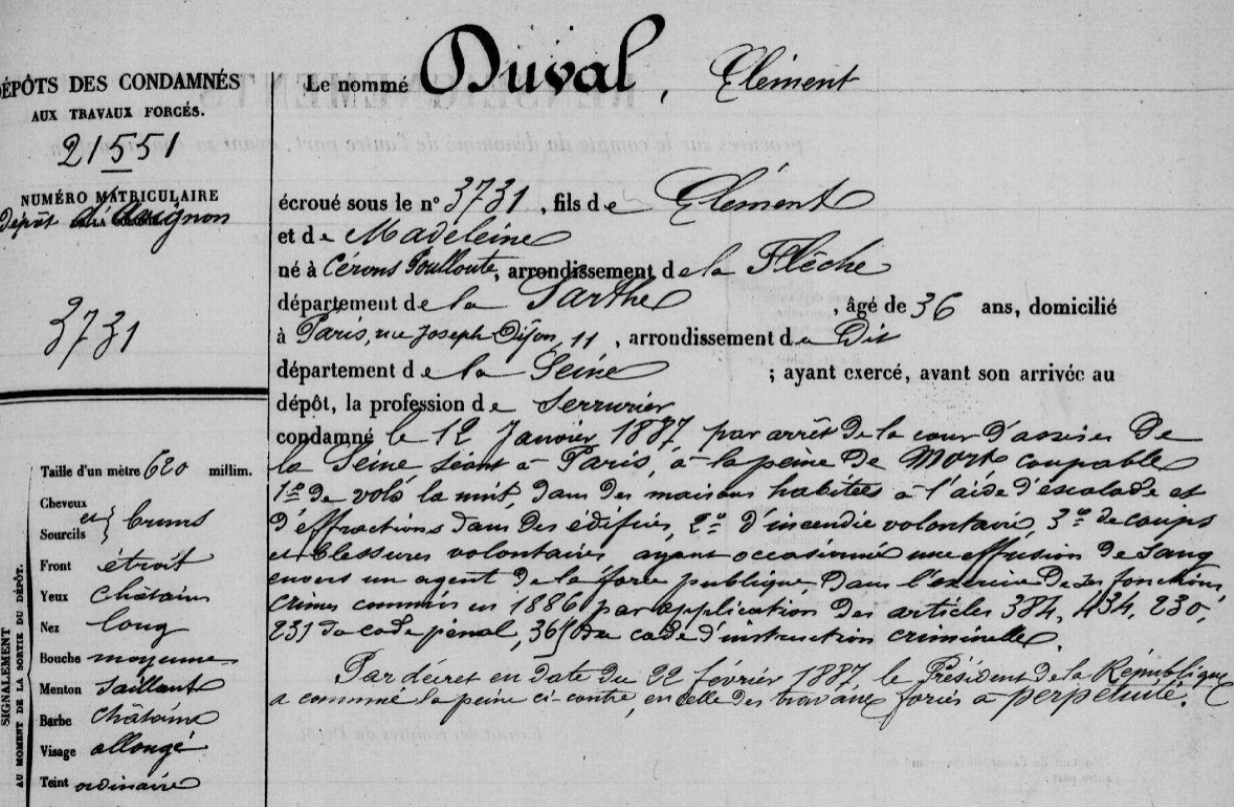
Convict record of Clément Duval, sentenced to deportation to the bagne (penal colony) before escaping in 1901

His death sentence was commuted to hard labour for life, and he was deported to the penal colony ('bagne') of the Salvation Islands. In the penal colony, he organized a gang of illegalist anarchists—with his group, he frequently fought with the prison guards and their convict auxiliaries. The anarchist observed the colonial system at work within the penal colony and developed a negative view of Arabs, who were often used by the colonial administration to support their own forces. This negative perception, shaped by his experience of deportation, was largely due to the colonial system in place in the penal colony.

He attempted to escape eighteen times and finally succeeded in April 1901.

=== Last years and death ===
Duval then spent two years in British Guiana before gathering enough money to travel to the United States, where he was welcomed by Italian and French comrades. There, he published his Memoirs, which were translated into Italian by Luigi Galleani—whom he had met and who deeply admired him for his courage and defiance of authority. Galleani translated the memoirs piece by piece and, as a mark of respect, later compiled them into a book spanning over a thousand pages. The first edition was edited by the anarchist militant Andrea Salsedo. In his Memoirs, Duval extensively recounted his life in the penal colony and his escape. He concluded the work with an anti-prison declaration, writing:

Comrades,
I have given you an exact account of a life lived in that hell, the penal colony. [...] Comrades, if you must act, let yourself be killed on the spot, beheaded—but never go to the penal colony.

In the final months of his life, Duval—now an elderly man severely afflicted by arthritis—was taken in by Raffaele and Fiorina Schiavina. They affectionately called him 'Nonno' (grandfather), leading neighbors to believe he was Raffaele's father. Not wanting to burden the family or Raffaele, who was living underground in the United States, the anarchist left their home two days before his death to stay with a fellow militant, Olivieri, who faced no risk of deportation. He died there on 29 March 1935 in Brooklyn, New York.

== Legacy ==
=== Influence on anarchism ===
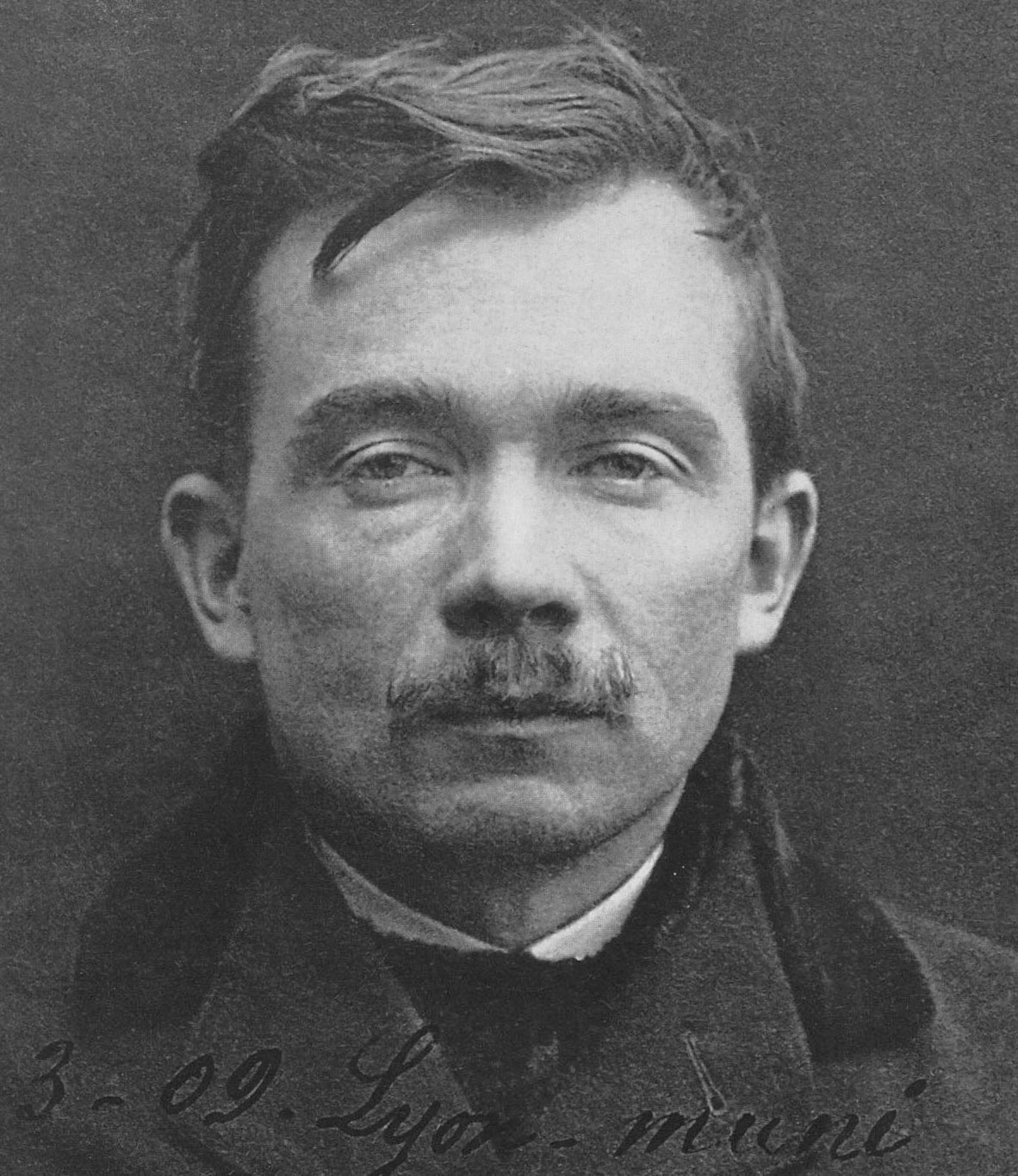
Jules Bonnot, who gave his name to the Bonnot Gang

Regarding the fact that police officers initially questioned the anarchist nature of illegalism, classifying Duval as a "common criminal," Goron declared:

Anarchy was not yet a major concern at the police headquarters; it was largely disbelieved, especially knowing the equivocal role of certain so-called revolutionaries, like those, for example, who had tried to blow up the statue of Mr. Thiers in Saint-Germain.

— Anarchy is a new pose among bandits, I heard people say around me; this Duval is a common thief and a common assassin.

However, I did not judge things quite the same way [...] I was struck to find in this letter written in Mazas, by a burglar, a vague echo of the crazy theories I had heard formulated by madmen, no doubt, but madmen of unquestionable loyalty and honesty.

According to Goron, Duval was one of the first anarchists—and in any case one of the first in France—to apply propaganda by the deed beyond theoretical declarations. For the police officer, Duval was the main inspirer of the Ère des attentats (1892–1894) and the Duval affair was the moment when anarchism in France evolved from an unimportant and unthreatening ideology for the authorities to one of the main opposition forces in France from the 1890s onwards.

Louise Michel followed the case closely. It divided socialists like Jules Guesde and anarchists alike. While Guesde published writings criticising Duval and his methods, Michel instead defended him—a stance that marked her clear commitment to anarchism, which she embraced even more clearly from that moment onward. She wrote that this was a declaration of war, that all anarchists must unite to prevent his execution, and that even if she were to be shot, it would not matter. Séverine adopted a hesitant stance toward Duval; while she regarded him with sympathy, she remained more distant than Michel.

His influence on illegalism and the anarchist movement in France endured at least until the time of the Bonnot Gang. That gang, who embraced illegalism, used it to pioneer modern banditry, carrying out the first motorized robberies and employing repeating rifles. In a correspondence between Grave and Duval, Grave blamed Duval for founding illegalism, pointing to the Bonnot Gang as its consequence.

=== Influence on art ===
Duval also left his mark on literature. Henri Charrière's Papillon presents a depoliticized version of his life story. Despite Grave's opposition to illegalism and his ambiguous relationship with Duval, he wrote an unperformed play titled Responsibilities!, largely based on the Duval affair.

== Works ==
=== Correspondence ===
Letters to the anarchist newspaper Le Révolté :

- "First letter to Le Révolté", Le Révolté, Paris, 6 November 1886
- "Second letter to Le Révolté", Le Révolté, Paris, 18 November 1886
- "Third letter to Le Révolté", Le Révolté, Paris, 17 March 1887

Other letters :

- "Letter to his judge", Le Petit Moniteur universel, Paris, 13 January 1887

=== Memoir ===
In 1929, Duval's memoir, Memorie Autobiografiche, was translated by Luigi Galleani and published in Italian. In 1980, Marianne Enckell, at C.I.R.A. in Lausanne, recovered part of Duval's original manuscript, and had it published as Outrage: An Anarchist Memoir of the Penal Colony.

== See also ==
- René Belbenoît
- Bonnot gang
- Expropriative anarchism
- The Panther of Batignolles
- Vittorio Pini

== Bibliography ==
- Avrich, Paul (2020). Sacco and Vanzetti : The Anarchist Background (3rd ed.). Princeton: Princeton University Press. ISBN 978-0-691-02604-6.
- Baylac, Marie-Hélène (2024), Louise Michel, Paris: Perrin, ISBN 978-2262097714
- Bonanno, Alfredo M. (2013), "Le problème du vol : Clément Duval" [The problem of theft: Clément Duval] (PDF), Salto, subversion & anarchie (in French), vol. 3
- Bouhey, Vivien (2009), Les Anarchistes contre la République [The Anarchists against the Republic] (in French), Rennes: Presses universitaires de Rennes (PUR)
- Delpech, Jean-Marc (2006), Parcours et réseaux d'un anarchiste : Alexandre Marius Jacob : 1879-1954 (PhD thesis) [The life and networks of an anarchist: Alexandre Marius Jacob: 1879-1954] (PDF) (in French), Nancy: Université de Nancy 2
- Galleani, Luigi, ed. (1929), "Clemente Duval (Cenno biografico)", Memorie autobiografiche (in Italian), Newark: Biblioteca de L'Adunata dei refrattari, pp. 15–69, OCLC 2314088
- Frayne, Carl Tobias (2021), Individualist Anarchism in France and Its Legacy (PhD thesis), Cambridge: University of Cambridge, doi:10.17863/CAM.80240
- Houte, Arnaud-Dominique (2021). Propriété défendue : La société française à l'épreuve du vol (XIXe - XXe siècles) [Property defended: French society and the challenge of theft (19th–20th centuries)] (in French). Gallimard. ISBN 9782072880667.
- Lévy, Thierry (2009), Plutôt la mort que l'injustice : Au temps des procès anarchistes [Rather death than injustice: In the days of the anarchist trials] (in French), Odile Jacob, ISBN 9782738118318
- Maitron, Jean; Enckell, Marianne (2022). "DUVAL Clément, Louis". Dictionnaire des anarchistes (in French). Paris: Maitron/Editions de l'Atelier.
- McLamb, Thomas (2022). Cybernetics And The Penal Colony: A History Of Capital, Machinery, And French Colonial Imprisonment (MA). Boone: Appalachian State University.
- Parry, Richard (1987), The Bonnot gang, Rebel Press, ISBN 978-0-946061-04-4
- Verhaeghe, Sidonie (2019), "Une pensée politique de la Commune : Louise Michel à travers ses Conférences" [A political thought of the Commune : Louise Michel through her Conferences], Actuel Marx (in French), 66 (2): 81–98, doi:10.3917/amx.066.0081
