= Faure =

Faure (pronounced [ˈfawɾe]) is an Occitan family name meaning blacksmith, from Latin faber. It is pronounced [fɔʁ] in French (unlike Fauré which is pronounced [foʁe]).

Notable people with the name include:

- Abraham Faure (1795–1875), Cape Colony clergyman and author
- Alfred Faure (cyclist) (1883–1935), French cyclist
- Amédée Faure (1801–1878), French painter
- Barry Faure (born 1964), Seychellois diplomat and politician
- Benoît Faure (1899–1980), French cyclist
- Bernard Faure (born 1948), Asian religion scholar
- Berthe Faure (1842–1920), Félix Faure's spouse
- Camille Alphonse Faure (1840–1898), French chemist
- Christian Faure (director) (born 1954), French screenwriter and film director
- Danny Faure (born 1962), President of Seychelles
- David Faure (1842–1916), South African Protestant minister
- David Faure (historian) (born 1947), Hong Kong historical anthropologist
- Dominique Faure (born 1959), French politician
- Douglas Faure, South African naval officer
- Duncan Faure (born 1956), South African singer
- Edgar Faure (1908–1988), 69th Prime Minister of France
- Edmond Faure (1927–2008), French wrestler
- Élie Faure (1873–1937), French art historian and essayist
- Etienne Faure (born 1969), French film director
- Eugène Faure (1822–1878), French painter
- Félix Faure (1841–1899), President of France from 1895 to 1899
- Fernand Faure (1853–1929), French economist and politician
- Fleur Faure (born 1993), French cyclist
- Florian Faure (born 1983), French rugby union player
- Francine Faure (1914–1979), Second wife of Albert Camus
- Francis Faure (1910–1953), French cyclist
- Gabriel Faure (writer) (1877–1962), French poet, novelist and essayist
- Gaël Faure (born 1987), French singer-songwriter
- Georges Le Faure (1856–1953), French writer
- Gilbert Faure (born 1943), French cross-country skier
- Gilbert-Amable Faure (1755–1819), French Navy officer and politician
- Guilhem Faure, Computational biologist
- Gunter Faure (1934–2025), Canadian-American geochemist
- Guy Olivier Faure (born 1943), French professor and researcher
- Hubert Faure (1914–2021), French military personnel
- Jacques Faure (French Army officer) (1904–1988), French Army general and skier
- Jacques-Paul Faure (1869–1924), French army officer
- Jean Faure (1937–2022), French politician
- Jean-Baptiste Faure (1830–1914), French opera singer
- Jean-Louis Faure (sculptor) (1931–2022), French sculptor
- Jean-Louis Faure (surgeon) (1863–1944), French surgeon
- Jean-Philippe Faure (born 1966), French footballer
- Julia Faure (born 1977), French actress
- Karyn Faure (born 1969), French swimmer
- Keith Faure (born 1951), Australian career criminal
- Lionel Faure (born 1977), French rugby union player
- Louis-Joseph Faure (1760–1837), French judge
- Lucie Faure (1908–1977), French writer and novelist
- Luigi Faure (1898–1946), Italian cross-country skier, Nordic combined skier and ski jumper
- Magdeleine Boucherit Le Faure (1879–1960), French pianist and composer
- Marcel Faure (1905–1984), French fencer
- Martine Faure (born 1948), French politician
- Maurice Faure (1922–2014), French politician
- Maurice Faure (sport shooter) (1859–1945), French sports shooter
- Maurice Faure (wrestler) (1927–2013), French wrestler
- Nick Faure (born 1944), English racing driver
- Olivier Faure (born 1968), French politician
- Patrice Faure (born 1967), French civil servant
- Patricia Faure (1928–2008), American art dealer, photographer, and gallery owner
- Patrick Faure (born 1946), French businessman
- Paul Faure (archaeologist) (1916–2007), French archaeologist
- Paul Faure (politician) (1878–1960), French socialist politician
- Pierre Faure (1777–1855), French geographer
- René Faure (1928–2005), French cyclist
- Renée Faure (1918–2005), French actress
- Roland Faure (1926–2023), French journalist
- Sébastien Faure (1858–1942), French anarchist
- Sébastien Faure (footballer) (born 1991), French footballer
- Théo Faure (born 1999), French volleyball player
- William C. Faure (1949–1994), South African film director
