= Faure (disambiguation) =

Faure is an Occitan surname.

Faure can also refer to:

- Fauré (surname), Occitan surname, variant of "Faure"
- Faure Chomón (1929–2019), Cuban historian and politician
- Faure Gnassingbé (born 1966), President of Togo
- Faure Island, an island in Shark Bay, Western Australia, Australia
- Faure Islands, island chain in Antarctica

- Faure Passage, marine passage near the Faure Islands

- Fauré Inlet, inlet in Antarctica
- Faure, South Africa, hamlet in the City of Cape Town, South Africa
