= Boucherit =

Disambiguation

Boucherit is a surname. Notable people with the surname include:

- Antar Boucherit (born 1983), Algerian football player
- Denise Soriano-Boucherit (1916–2006), French violinist
- Jules Boucherit (1877–1962), French violinist
- Magdeleine Boucherit (1879–1960), French pianist
- Pascal Boucherit (born 1959), French canoe sprinter
