= Fuller Rock =

Rock awash

- Location within Antarctica

Geography
- Location: Antarctica
- Coordinates: 68°10′S 68°54′W

Administration
- Administered under the Antarctic Treaty System

Demographics
- Population: Uninhabited

Fuller Rock is a rock awash, one of the principal dangers to ships on the north side of Faure Passage, Marguerite Bay, Antarctica, about 7.8 kilometres (4.2 nmi) south-southwest of Dismal Island. It was charted by a Royal Navy Hydrographic Survey Unit from RRS John Biscoe in January 1973 and named after Lieutenant Andrew C. Fuller, Royal Navy, who directed the survey.
