= Guilhem Faure =

Computational biologist

- Known for: Discovery of TIGR-Tas RNA-guided systems, Fanzor protein research
- Scientific career
- Fields: Computational Biology, Genomics
- Workplaces: Broad Institute; National Institutes of Health
- Academic advisors: Feng Zhang, Eugene Koonin

Guilhem Faure is a computational biologist best known for leading the discovery of Tandem Interspaced Guide RNA (TIGR-Tas) systems, a novel class of RNA-guided DNA-targeting proteins found in prokaryotes and their viruses. He is also recognized for his work on Fanzor proteins, the first programmable RNA-guided endonuclease found in eukaryotes.

== Education ==
Ph.D. Computational Biology (2011), Pierre and Marie Curie University, Paris, France

== Research career ==
Faure is currently a Senior Group Lead at the Broad Institute of MIT and Harvard, working in the laboratory of Feng Zhang. He also holds a Staff Affiliate position at the McGovern Institute for Brain Research at MIT. According to his Google Scholar profile, Faure has an h-index of 30, demonstrating significant research impact in his field.

Prior to his current position, Faure completed postdoctoral research at the National Center for Biotechnology Information (NCBI), National Library of Medicine, National Institutes of Health in Bethesda, Maryland, working in Eugene Koonin's lab.

== Scientific contributions ==
=== TIGR-Tas Systems ===
Faure led the discovery of TIGR-Tas systems, revealing a novel class of RNA-guided DNA-targeting proteins with significant implications for understanding molecular mechanisms in prokaryotes and their viruses. These systems are notably compact—averaging a quarter of the size of Cas9—and do not require PAM sequences for targeting, theoretically allowing any site in the genome to be targetable.

The discovery process involved using artificial intelligence to analyze vast amounts of protein data. His team used protein large language models to cluster related proteins and identify the TIGR-Tas family. Faure has also contributed to research on other RNA-guided systems, including Fanzor proteins, the first programmable RNA-guided endonuclease found in eukaryotes.

=== SARS-CoV-2 contributions ===
During the COVID-19 pandemic, Faure contributed to several studies on SARS-CoV-2. He was part of the team that developed the highly-cited SHERLOCK one-pot testing method for SARS-CoV-2 detection, published in The New England Journal of Medicine, which provided a rapid diagnostic tool. His work also included research on the genomic determinants of pathogenicity in SARS-CoV-2 and other human coronaviruses, published in PNAS. Furthermore, he co-authored a study in mBio investigating epistasis at the SARS-CoV-2 receptor-binding domain interface and its implications for vaccine escape.

=== CRISPR-Cas Systems and Mobile Genetic Elements ===
Faure has made significant contributions to the understanding of CRISPR-Cas systems and their association with mobile genetic elements (MGEs). His review in Nature Reviews Microbiology provided a comprehensive overview of CRISPR-Cas in MGEs, discussing their roles in counter-defense and beyond.

=== mRNA and Protein Structure ===
His foundational work includes studies on the interplay between mRNA structure and protein folding. A key publication in Nucleic Acids Research explored the role of mRNA structure in controlling protein folding, suggesting that stable mRNA secondary structures can act as modulators of co-translational folding. Further contributing to the understanding of protein interactions, he co-developed InterEvScore, a scoring function for protein complex interfaces that incorporates evolutionary information, published in the journal Bioinformatics.

== Affiliations ==
- Broad Institute of MIT and Harvard (Senior Computational Scientist)
- National Institutes of Health (Former Postdoctoral Researcher)

== Selected publications ==
- Faure, G., et al. (2025). "TIGR-Tas: A family of modular RNA-guided DNA-targeting systems in prokaryotes and their viruses." Science. 10.1126/science.adv9789
- Faure, G., Shmakov, S.A., Yan, W.X. et al. (2019). "CRISPR–Cas in mobile genetic elements: counter-defence and beyond." Nat Rev Microbiol 17, 513–525. 10.1038/s41579-019-0204-7
