= Fauré (surname) =

Fauré (French: [foʁe]) is an Occitan family name, a variant of Faure, although the latter is pronounced [fɔʁ].

Notable people with the surname include:

- Alain Fauré (1962–2018), French politician
- Andrée Fauré (1904–1985), French ceramist and designer
- Antoine Fauré (1883–1954), French cyclist
- Camille Fauré (1874–1956), French ceramicist
- Cédric Fauré (born 1979), French footballer
- Christian Fauré (cyclist) (born 1951), French cyclist
- Emmanuel Fauré-Fremiet (1883–1971), French biologist, son of Gabriel
- Gabriel Fauré (1845–1924), French composer
- Gérard Fauré (born 1946), French essayist
- Maurice Fauré (1859–1945), French sports shooter
- Nicolas Fauré (born 1984), French rugby league player (b.1984)
- Sylvain Fauré (born 1978), Monegasque swimmer

== See also ==
- Foray (surname)
