= OMEGA endonuclease =

Class of RNA-guided gene editing systems

OMEGA (obligate mobile element guided activity) systems are a class of RNA-guided DNA targeting systems encoded by transposable elements. They include an OMEGA endonuclease (TnpB, IscB or IsrB) which cleaves DNA, and a non-coding guide RNA, called ωRNA, which guides the enzyme to a target sequence. Like Cas enzymes, to cleave DNA, OMEGA endonucleases must first recognize a specific DNA sequence, called a transposon-adjacent motif (TAM, akin to a protospacer-adjacent motif). OMEGA systems occur in both prokaryotes and eukaryotes.

== History ==
Originally reported and named in 2021 by a team centered around the labs of Feng Zhang and Eugene Koonin, OMEGA systems were identified as likely evolutionary precursors to the CRISPS-Cas systems, namely the endonucleases Cas9 and Cas12. The original paper, published in Science, reported on both the IscB and TnpB endonucleases, and a subsequent 2021 paper (from the lab of Virginijus Šikšnys, published in Nature) reported on the TnpB endonuclease.

In 2023, the Fanzor endonuclease was discovered in eukaryotic cells, and is generally considered an OMEGA endonuclease.

The primary significance of the discovery of each of these systems is considered to be their potential for use in gene editing.

== Application in gene editing ==
Much of the application to date using OMEGA systems has been early and comparative. For example, early work showed that the indel patterns of these systems closely mimic that of Cas12a. To date, no OMEGA system has been applied in human disease.

OMEGA systems are compact in size in comparison to most CRISPR-Cas systems (excluding Cas12). Thus, unlike Cas9 systems, they are able to be packaged in an adeno-associated virus (AAV) vector, allowing delivery into living human tissues for therapeutic purposes. Sickle cell disease is considered to be a good candidate for applications of OMEGA systems, including Fanzor.
