= Jean-Louis Faure =

Jean-Louis Faure may refer to:

- Jean-Louis Faure (surgeon) (1863–1944), French surgeon
- Jean-Louis Faure (sculptor) (1931–2022), French sculptor and writer
- Jean-Louis Faure (actor) (1953–2022), French actor and director
