= Jacques Dejean =

French classical violinist

Jacques Dejean (13 December 1919, in Bordeaux – 7 July 2013, in Sainte-Foy-la-Grande) was a French classical violinist.

== Biography ==
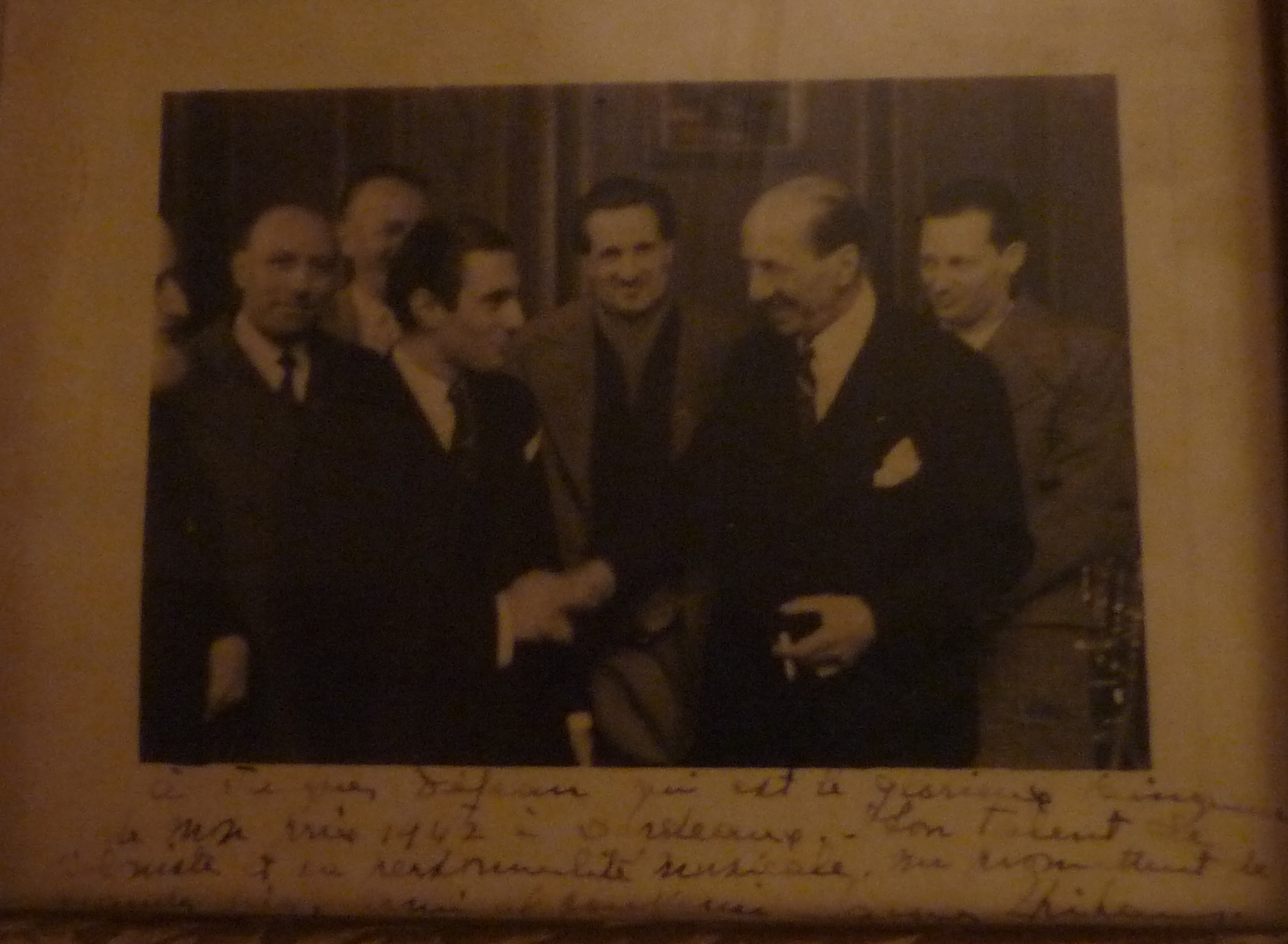
Presentation of the 1st Jacques Thibaud Prize in 1942, from left to right: Firmin Touche, Gaston Poulet, André Asselin, Jacques Dejean (laureate), Jules Boucherit, Jacques Thibaud, Jean Fournier

His father, Louis Dejean, was a violin teacher and a violinist at the Grand Théâtre de Bordeaux; his mother, Rose Fino, of Basque origin, was a renowned piano teacher. After a first prize in violin and a first prize in viola at the Conservatoire de Bordeaux in 1936, Dejean entered Jules Boucherit's class at the Conservatoire de Paris, where he obtained the first prize in violin, unanimously "first named". In 1942 he won first prize in the Jacques Thibaud Competition (jury composed of Jacques Thibaud, Jules Boucherit, Gaston Poulet, Jean Fournier, André Asselin and Firmin Touche) the year it was founded in Bordeaux.

Concertmaster of many orchestras (Grand Théâtre de Bordeaux, Concerts Colonne, Orchestre Lamoureux, Pasdeloup Orchestra, Orquesta Sinfónica del Estado de México), he was also a member of several French string quartets (Tessier Quartet, Lespine Quartet, ORTF Quartet,) with which he recorded and toured the world.

His professional activity was enlivened by exceptional encounters. As a soloist, he collaborated and recorded with renowned artists such as Paul Paray, Jacques Février, Henryk Szeryng, Lily Laskine, Édith Piaf, Milva, Luciano Berio, Marius Constant, Pierre Boulez, Peter Brook and Jérôme Deschamps.

Very young, he was a professor at the conservatories of Bordeaux and Nantes. His sight-reading classes at the Conservatoire de Paris were attended by a whole generation of violinists and violists. Conservatoire teachers noted that due to his kind approach to teaching musical theory was able to bring many of his students to their highest level.

His twin brother, Pierre Dejean, was a percussionist and timpanist at the French Radio from 1943 to 1974 before devoting himself entirely to a career as a painter.

Dejean is buried at the Cimetière de La Chartreuse in Bordeaux alongside his uncle André Fino, a talented pianist, composer and artist who died prematurely during the First World War.
