= Pipkin (disambiguation) =

A pipkin is an earthenware cooking pot.

Pipkin may also refer to:

== People ==
- Antonio Pipkin (born 1995), Canadian football player
- E. J. Pipkin (born 1956), American politician
- John Pipkin (born 1967), American author
- Joyce Pipkin (1924–2017), American football player
- Everest Pipkin, American artist
- Marvin Pipkin (1889–1977), American chemist
- Sarah Bedichek Pipkin (1913–1977), American geneticist
- Trea Pipkin (born 1980/1981), American jurist
- Turk Pipkin (born 1952), American actor

== Fictional characters ==
- Pipkin (Watership Down), from the 1972 novel by Richard Adams
- Andy Pipkin, in the BBC show Little Britain
- Pipkin, in Ray Bradbury's novel The Halloween Tree

== Other uses ==
- Pipkin (volcano), a volcano in California
- Pipkin Rock, an island in Antarctica
- Pipkin classification, system of categorizing femoral head hip fractures

== See also ==
- Pipkins (disambiguation)
- Pip (nickname)
