= Pipkin Rock =

- Location within Antarctica

Geography
- Location: Antarctica
- Coordinates: 68°5′S 68°50′W

Administration
- Administered under the Antarctic Treaty System

Demographics
- Population: Uninhabited

Pipkin Rock is a small ice-free island, lying northeast of Dismal Island in the Faure Islands, Marguerite Bay. The Faure Islands were discovered and first charted in 1909 by the French Antarctic Expedition under Charcot. The group was surveyed in 1949 by Falkland Islands Dependencies Survey (FIDS) and so named from the insignificant size of the feature.
