= Hotel du Cantal =

Painting by Jean Dubuffet

- Artist: Jean Dubuffet
- Year: 1961
- Medium: oil on canvas
- Dimensions: 89 cm × 116 cm (35 in × 46 in)
- Location: Musée des Arts Décoratifs, Paris

Hotel du Cantal is an oil on canvas painting by the French painter Jean Dubuffet, created in 1961. The work, part of a major donation made by the artist in 1967, is held at the Musée des Arts Décoratifs, in Paris.

== Description ==
The canvas depicts a cityscape which represents automobile traffic in a shopping street where are particularly noticeable the signs of a store, an adjoining hotel and a pharmacy. The style of the painting is deliberately primitive, even childlike. The street cars are presented in a very elementar style, similarly to their drivers. The cars have only two wheels, with a visible window, and appear like seen from above. Four cars are parked at the sidewalk, where a single man is seen apparently walking. A person is seen waving from the upper window of the hotel.
