= Camille Fauré =

French artist

Camille Raymond Fauré
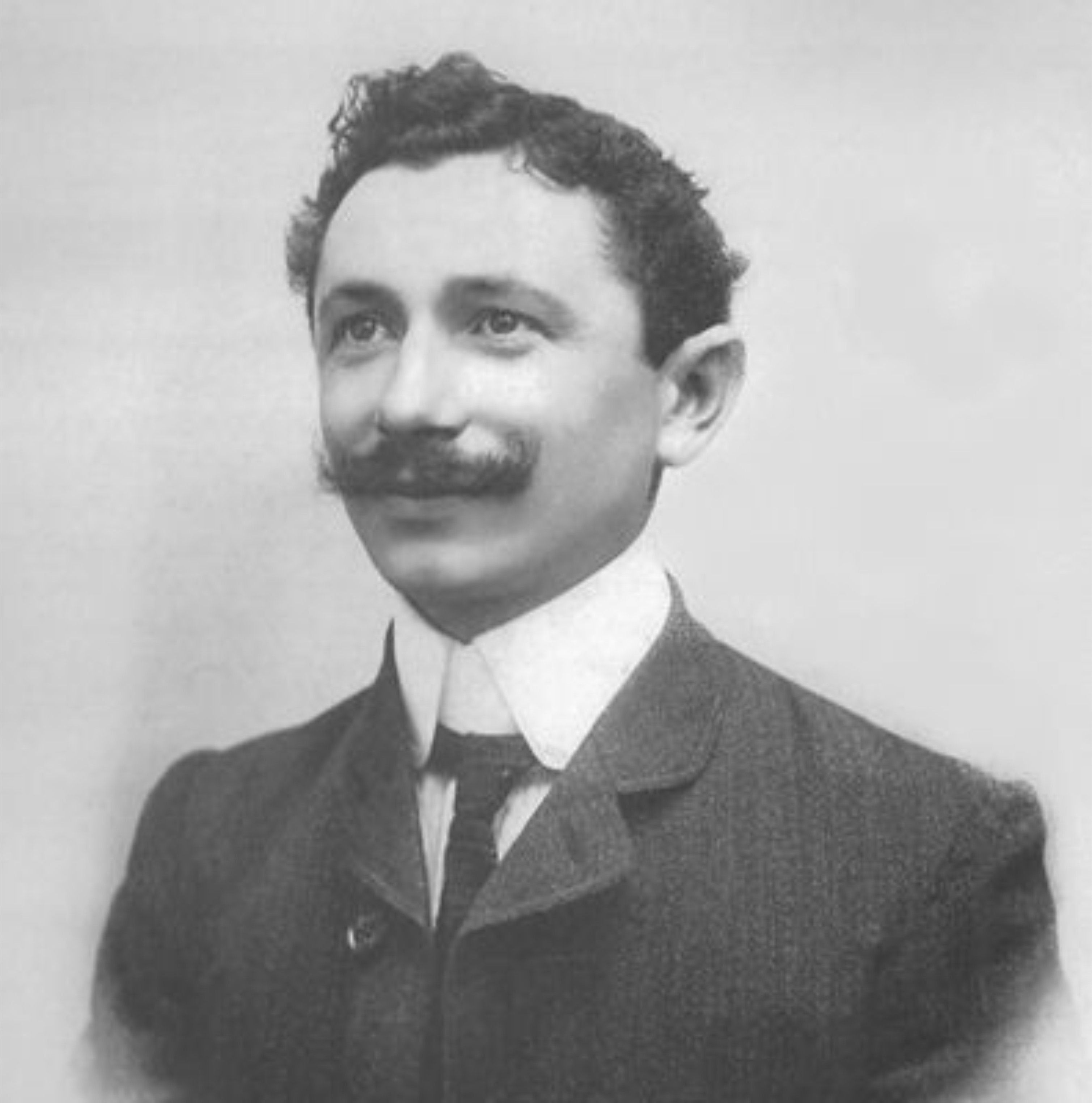
- Born: November 16, 1874; Perigueux
- Died: October 7, 1956 (aged 81); Paris
- Known for: Enamels

Camille Fauré (1874–1956) was a French enamel artist best known for his design work for the Limoges porcelain company in Limoges. Floral and figurative patterns in richly glazed colours were his signature.

== Early life and training ==
His parents were the painter Jean Marie Bertrand Fauré (1840 - 1895) and Marie Pinsan (1845 - 1924). He was born in Périgueux where he started as an apprentice.

In 1900, he married Marie Madeleine Barbaud (1883 - 1950) in Limoges. The couple had two daughters, Gabrielle Réjane (1902 - 1968) and Andrée Fauré (1904 - 1985). (Note: Gabrielle became a gifted pianist and Andrée an artisan at Camille's atélier. (Shayo, p 12))

At the turn of the century, he was selling his creations in Paris at the Au Vase Etrusque shop. (Note: Established in 1887 by Louis Damon (1860 – 1947), it was located at 20 du Boulevard Malasherbes) In Au Vase Etrusque, he produced and displayed vases, bowls, ashtrays, boxes and other items.

In 1919 he began to exhibit at the Foire de Lyon. Later on, he would also attend the Foire de Paris. The two events gave his 20 employees enough work for the entire year.

== Success ==
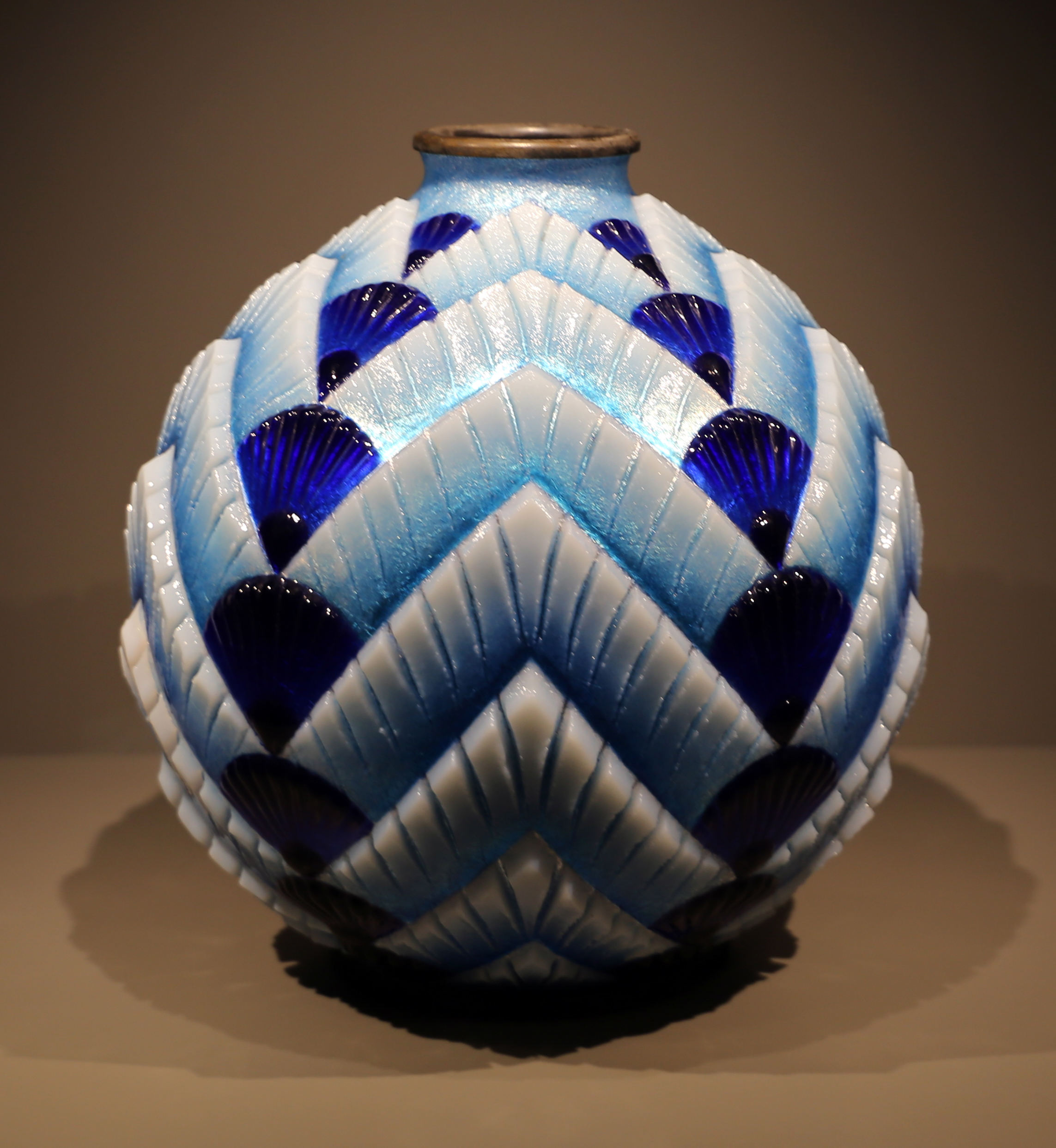
A vase by Fauré, Kunstgewerbemuseum Berlin

In 1919, he joined Alexandre Marty (1876 - 1943) in creating new enamel production methods involving flamed / frosted enamels. Together they designed and exhibited pieces under the brand "Fauré et Marty", including a small number of pendants in enameled gold, silver and copper. In early 1925, the two parted.

The International Exhibition of Modern Decorative and Industrial Arts of 1925 (Note: This exhibition famously gave rise to the term Art Deco) was Fauré's breakthrough. He became Limoges's most famous enamel artist. Among other active enamellers of Limoges during the 1920s were Paul Bonnaud (1873-1953), Jules Sarlandie (1874–1936), and Henriette Marty (1902–1995). (Note: The daughter of Alexandre Marty.)

In 1925, Fauré opened his own business in Limoges where he hired five enamellists to whom he gave freedom of creation: Lucie Dadat, Pierre Bardy, Louis Valade, Marcelle Decouty-Védrenne and Jeanne Soubourou. They signed their pieces with the brand “C. Fauré Limoges”. The workshop specialized in two areas: advertising signs and plaques for shops (at a time when department stores were booming) as well as house painting and decoration.

When he died in 1956, his daughter Andrée Faure took over the business, C. Fauré Limoges. It closed its doors in 1985.

== Legacy ==
His early and post World War II pieces involved large floral patterns, often in rich colors keeping in line with the Art Nouveau style.

His creativity and boldness manifests in the 1920s, when he started using large vessels, vases, bowls or open-mouthed jardinières, multiple layers of polychrome enamels in hard, vitreous, three-dimensional geometric designs of subtle complexity and color combinations.

His designs set him apart as one of the most highly regarded enamellers of the Art Deco style. His chevrons, lozenges, diagonal and stripe patterns and floral motifs set him apart from his contemporaries, ranging from naturalistic to stylized patterns of leaves to vibrant flowers. The geometric patterns featured strong hues of blue, red, orange and yellow accented with blacks. Some of the floral patterns had more delicate hues such as turquoise, light blue, pink, lavender and white. Some vases had panels and borders of floral motifs combined with geometric steps and cubist motifs.

His works can be found in private collections and also at the Musée des Beaux-Arts de Limoges, at the Musée des Arts Décoratifs, Paris, the Louvre; at the Museum für Angewandte Kunst (Cologne); at the Musée de l'Horlogerie et de l'Emaillerie in Geneva, Switzerland; at the Vittoriale degli Italiani in Brescia, Lombardy; and in the United States: at the Kirkland Museum of Fine & Decorative Art in Denver, the Corning Museum of Glass and the Cooper Hewitt, Smithsonian Design Museum in New York, the Virginia Museum of Fine Arts, the Walters Art Museum in Baltimore, and the Smart Museum of Art in Chicago, among others.

== Sources ==
- Michel Kiener: "Camille Fauré et les siens : Du bâtiment aux émaux Art Déco", Limoges, Éditions Mon Limousin, 2021, 144 p. view online
- Michel C. Kiener: "Les emaux art deco de l'atélier Fauré", Editions Culture et Patrimoine en Limousin, 2016.
- Michel C. Kiener: "Limoges en Art déco, Les vases de cuivre émaillé de l’atelier Fauré".
- Alberto Shayo: "Camille Fauré: Limoges Art Deco Enamels: the Geometry of Joy", Antique Collectors' Club, 2007.
- Erika Speel: "Dictionary of Enamelling: History and Techniques", Routledge, 2018.
