= Kirkwood Islands =

- Location within Antarctica

Geography
- Location: Antarctica
- Coordinates: 68°22′S 69°0′W

Administration
- Administered under the Antarctic Treaty System

Demographics
- Population: Uninhabited

The Kirkwood Islands are a scattered group of reefs and rocks, with one larger island, lying in the central part of Marguerite Bay, 28 kilometres (15 nmi) south-southwest of the Faure Islands, Antarctica. The islands were sighted in 1949 from the Falkland Islands Dependencies Survey vessel John Biscoe, and a running survey was made from the ship in 1950. They are named for Commander Henry Kirkwood, Royal Navy, in command of the John Biscoe at that time.

== See also ==
- List of Antarctic and sub-Antarctic islands
