= Jean-Louis Faure (sculptor) =

French sculptor (1931–2022)

Jean-Louis Faure (1931 - 22 February 2022) was a French sculptor, painter and writer. He is best known for his work as a sculptor, which began in 1979, and consists of 112 sculptures, which Faure himself referred to as "narrative carpentry handiwork".

== Early life and education ==
Jean-Louis Faure was born in Paris in 1931. He received his elementary and secondary education at the Saint-Seurin-de-Prats school and in several Parisian Lycées, as well as at the College of Guienne.

On 15 May 1942, his father François Faure, who was active in the French Resistance, was arrested by the Nazis and sent first to Struthof and then to Dachau concentration camp. He returned in 1945 and was awarded the Order of Liberation.

In 1950 Jean-Louis Faure was admitted to the Beaux-Arts de Paris, during which time he learned etching.

He carried out his military service in Algeria from 1952-1954. As a spahi he was assigned to the Governor's Horse Guard, where his artistic talents were noticed, and he became the official painter to the cavalry. He was discharged in May 1954, shortly before the beginning of the Algerian War. He went into self-imposed exile in Bolivia from 1955-1956, on the Isla del Sol in the middle of Lake Titicaca. The first exhibition of this paintings was in La Paz. Faure lived in Argentina until 1959. He was arrested and tried on his return to France, but was acquitted by justice de classe.

== Artistic career ==
Faure supported the Manifesto of the 121, in support of the right to insubordination. He became art director for various French magazines and major publishers, and contributed to the creation of the pocket-book collection 10/18. In 1966 he produced issues of the magazine Le Crapouillot, devoted to the Funeral Parlour business, LSD and the Swedes. In 1969 he was hired by the Éditions Rencontre. There he worked, uncredited, on the making of Max Ophuls' and André Harris's Le Chagrin et La Pitié (The Sorrow and the Pity).

In 1973 Faure took up painting again, producing the Capitonnages (Upholsteries) series.

In 1979 he began working with sculpture. The first exhibition of his sculptures took place in rue Berryer in 1983, in the same room where President Paul Doumer had been assassinated in 1932, before being embalmed by Élie Faure, grandfather of Jean-Louis Faure.

In 1987, he appeared in a documentary about contemporary sculpture by the German director Heinz-Peter Schwerfel. Michel Nuridsany, art critic for Le Figaro, wrote of the documentary: "Best ignore the presence of Frenchman Jean-Louis Faure, who was probably chosen to compound the notion, very prevalent in Germany, that French Art ceased to exist twenty years ago."

The sculpture Bêtise de l'Intelligence (1994) in the artist's studio. It shows Jean-Paul Sartre and Simone de Beauvoir refusing to shake Arthur Koestler's hand. Staline is the true subject of the piece, part of the Régis Debray collection.

Beginning in 1979, Jean-Louis Faure made 112 sculptures, which he referred to as "works of narrative carpentry", as well as designing the Académie des Sciences sword for Professor Alain-Jacques Valleron.

Faure died on 22 February 2022 from COVID-19.

== Works ==
From the beginning in 1979, Faure often incorporated manufactured objects in his pieces, such as taps, car-mats, plates or cutlery. Later these incorporations would come to include personal belongings (decorations, photographs, and weapons) as well as artworks, some inherited from his grandfather Elie Faure.

Faure used consecutive numbering for his sculptures, each of which are accompanied by detailed texts published online, which are an integral part of the artwork. These texts reflect on historical figures and real events by way of freely interpreted anecdotes, articulating an idiosyncratic view of history.

According to Bertrand Raison, "In order to approach Jean-Louis Faure's univers sculpté (you must) read the titles of his works, but furthermore (...) closely parse the small notes he painstakingly composes for each piece. The sculpture and its caption go hand in hand". Patrick Marnham wrote that "[M]uch of Faure's work grows out of his fascination with the darker sides of French history and the farcical undercurrents of power. The titles give the flavour of his preoccupations."

In 2004 Régis Debray, a collector of Faure's work, planned to build a wooden structure on his property to exhibit his collection, though the project did not come to fruition.

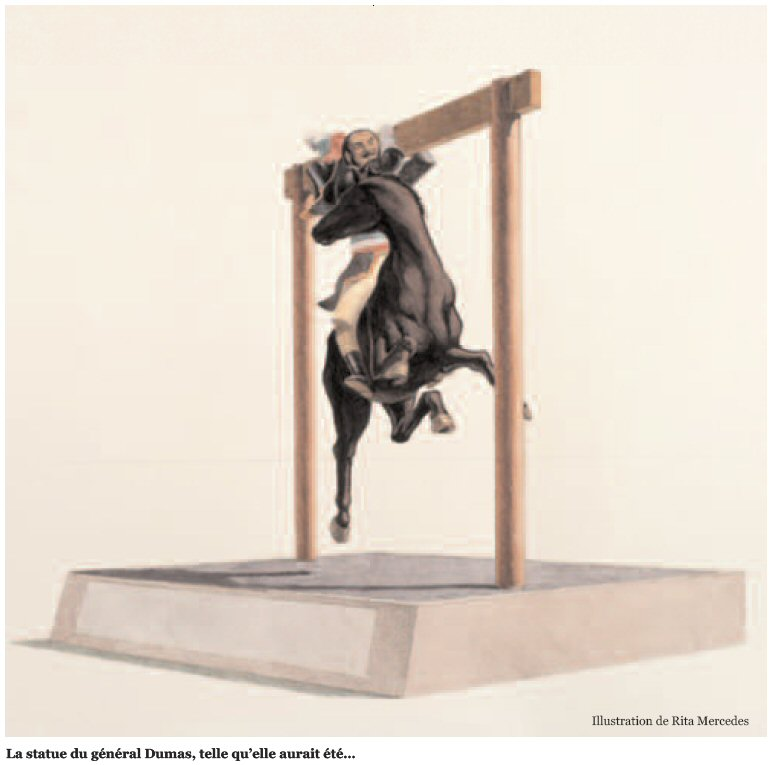
Illustration (by Rita Mercedes) of the proposed "Project for a Monument for the Ville de Paris commemorating General Dumas"

In 2006, for a commission by the City of Paris, Faure submitted a project for a sculpture in honour of General Thomas-Alexandre Dumas which would have been erected in Place du Général Catroux, on a grassy embankment bordered by Avenue de Villiers, 50 metres from Gustave Doré's tribute to Alexandre Dumas, the general's son. The Direction des Affaires Culturelles de la Ville de Paris did not follow up on this proposition.

In 2009, there was an exhibitions and (temporary) consignment of almost all the sculptures in the Dominique Vivant Denon and Nicéphore Niépce Museums in Chalon-sur-Saône.

== Exhibitions ==
Personal shows (a selection)

- Jean-Louis Faure - Sculptures, Galerie Alain Blondel, Paris, from 16/10/1984 to 05/01/1985.
- Jean-Louis Faure/ Gérard Gasiorowski. La Guerre, Gallery Arlogos (in collaboration with Gallery Adrien Maeght, Paris) 1989.
- Jean-Louis Faure sculptures Musée de l'Elysée, Lausanne, from 21/01 to 28/03, 1993
- Jean-Louis Faure, Sculpteur d'Histoire(s), une retrospective, [Sculptor of History(Stories)], Musée Vivant Denon and Musée Nicèphore-Niepce, Châlon-sur-Saône, from June 20 to September 28, 2009
- Jean-Louis Faure: Histoire(s) (History/Stories) Bibliothèque Alexis de Tocqueville in association with the Memorial pour la Paix, Caen. From March 16 to April 22, 2018.

Group shows (a selection)

- Rendez-vous des Artistes : Christian Corre/Jean-Louis Faure/ Jean-Pierre Le Boul'ch/ Alain Tirouflet, Fondation Nationale des Arts Graphiques et Plastiques, Paris (chosen by Michel Troche) January 18 to February 14, 1983.
- Fusionen : Faure, Fleischer, Lavier, Rousse, Bayer Kultur Forum Leverkusen.
- Jean-Louis Faure, Richard Baquié, Fabrice Hibert, Galerie Arlogos, Nantes.
- Un autre Monde/// Dans Notre Monde. Evocation contemporaine du réalisme fantastique, [Another World/// within our World. Fantastic realism, a contemporary testimonial.] (...) F.R.A.C. Provence-Alpes-Côte d'Azur. Marseille, from March 23 to June 27, 2019.
- Emmanuel Guibert en bonne compagnie, Musée d'Angoulême, from May 19 to June 27, 2021.

== Writings ==
- La plus puissante des impuissances [The most powerful impotence], in Revue d'Esthétique 33, 1998.
- J'ai vu les mêmes abrutis dénoncer les Juifs, puis tondre les femmes. [I have seen the same morons inform on Jews and later shave off women's hair]. Foreword by Régis Debray; avant-propos by Charles-Henri Favrod, Gollion, (Switzerland) Infolio editions, 2012. ISBN 9782884748131

== Filmography ==
- La Troisième Dimension Réalisateur : Heinz-Peter Schwerfel (1ère partie : Franck Dorneiff, Markus Lüpertz, Markus Raetz, Jean-Louis Faure, Richard Deacon - 2ème partie : Gloria Friedman, Tony Cragg, Michelangelo Pistoletto, Anne et Patrick Poirier). Coproduction la SEPT, Arion, HPS films, WDR, ORD, ENAP. 1987.
- Vies: Alain Cavalier Avec Jean-Louis Faure, Michel Labelle, Alain Pouliquen, Françoise Widhoff. 87 minutes, 2000.
- Être vivant et le savoir : Alain Cavalier, 80 minutes, 2019. (features the sculpture La Jeune Morte).
