= Marc Soriano =

French philosopher

Marc Soriano (7 July 1918 in Cairo – 18 December 1994) was a 20th-century French philosopher.

After the death of his father, his family went to Italy. He stayed in Pisa between 1921 and 1927, then went to live in Paris. A pupil at Lycée Condorcet in Paris, he was the only khâgneux received at the École Normale Supérieure in 1939, but his name is not on the directories. Mobilized in 1939, wounded in April 1940, he joined the Résistance in 1942. He was received in the first place at the December special session of the Aggregation of Philosophy Competition of 1945. For some time he followed the seminars of Pierre-Maxime Schuhl at the Sorbonne, and then worked in Geneva with Jean Piaget. He specialized in tales, especially those of Charles Perrault. Suffering from myasthenia gravis since 1978, which had caused him to lose the use of speech, he died on 18 December 1994.

A laureate of the Prix Sainte-Beuve in 1968 for his study les Contes de Perrault, culture savante et tradition populaire, the Académie française also bestowed him its Prix d'Académie in 1991 for all his work.

He was violinist Denise Soriano-Boucherit's brother.

== Works ==
- 1968: Les Contes de Perrault, culture savante et traditions populaires, Gallimard, series "La Bibliothèque des idées"
- 1978: Portrait de l'artiste jeune, suivi des quatre premiers textes publiés de Jules Verne. Postface by Ray Bradbury. Gallimard
- 1981: La Semaine de la comète. Rapport secret sur l'enfance et la jeunesse au XIXe, Stock
- 1975: Guide de la littérature pour la jeunesse, Flammarion
- 1993: Les Secrets du violon. Souvenirs de Jules Boucherit (1877–1962), Paris, Editions des Cendres
