= Pierre Larthomas =

Pierre Henri Larthomas (4 June 1915 in Sainte-Foy-la-Grande – 8 July 2000) was a French theatre theorist. Larthomas entered the French Army in 1930 as a cadet officer and in the spring of 1940 was awarded the Croix de Guerre. Shortly thereafter he was taken prisoner and spent the next five years in German administered POW camps. It was during that period that he began to write. After WWII he was a schoolmaster at Lycees in Bordeaux and Paris.

== Works ==
- 1948: Rencontre: roman , Paris, Rene Julliard, 1948
- 1951: Solitaire, Boston, Houghton Mifflin.
- 1965: Le Supplément du Dictionnaire critique de Féraud, Le Français Moderne, 33: 241-55
- Le Langage dramatique, Paris, Presses Universitaires de France, 1972, 1997 et 2012, ISBN 978-2-13-060647-5
- 1966: Eugénie, collection Espace théâtre, Espaces 34, ISBN 978-2907293341
- 1997: La Technique du théâtre, Que sais-je ?, Presses universitaires de France, ISBN 978-2130441731
- 1998: Notions de stylistique générale, Linguistique nouvelle, Presses universitaires de France, ISBN 978-2130496113
- 1999: Le Mariage de Figaro, Folio, European Schoolbooks, ISBN 978-2070410866
