= Faure Passage =

Marine channel in Marguerite Bay

Faure Passage (68°14′S 68°33′W) is a marine channel or passage between the Faure Islands and Kirkwood Islands in Marguerite Bay. The name "Pasaje Faure" was applied by Argentine workers in the area in association with the Faure Islands.
