= Eugene Koonin =

American biologist

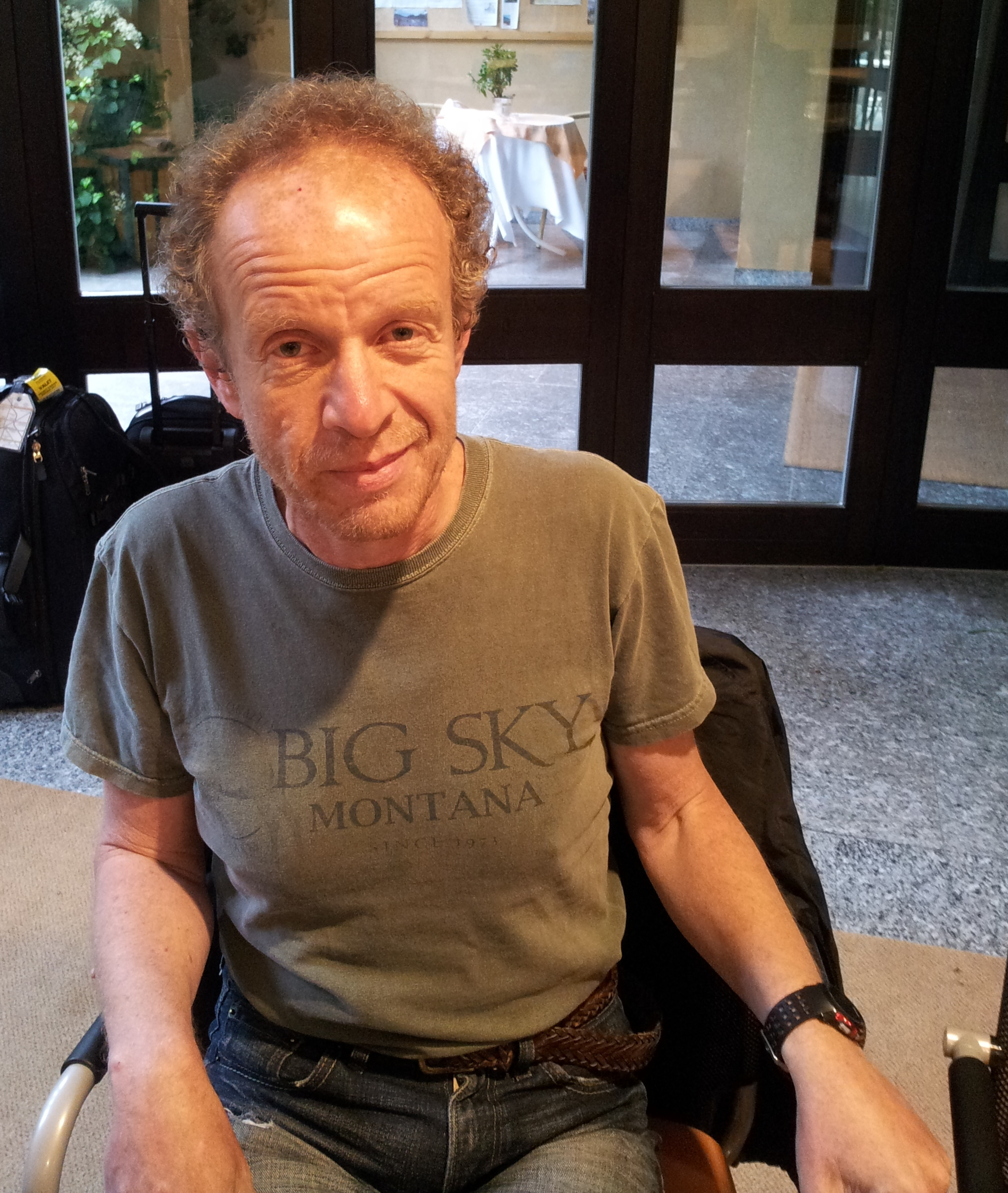
- Born: Eugene V. Koonin; Moscow
- Citizenship: United States
- Education: Moscow State University (1978)
- Scientific career
- Fields: Computational biology
- Workplaces: National Center for Biotechnology Information
- Thesis: Multienzyme organization of encephalomyocarditis virus replication complexes (1983)
- Doctoral advisor: Vadim I. Agol
- Website: www.ncbi.nlm.nih.gov/CBBresearch/Koonin/

Eugene Viktorovich Koonin (Russian: Евге́ний Ви́кторович Ку́нин) is a Russian-American biologist and Senior Investigator at the National Center for Biotechnology Information (NCBI). He is a recognised expert in the field of evolutionary and computational biology.

== Education ==
Koonin gained a Master of Science in 1978 and a PhD in 1983 in molecular biology, both from the Department of Biology at Moscow State University. His PhD thesis, titled "Multienzyme organization of encephalomyocarditis virus replication complexes", was supervised by Vadim I. Agol.

== Research ==
From 1985 to 1991, Koonin worked as a research scientist in computational biology in the Institutes of Poliomyelitis and Microbiology at the USSR Academy of Medical Sciences, studying virus biochemistry and bacterial genetics. In 1991, Koonin moved to the NCBI, where he has held a Senior Investigator position since 1996.

Koonin's principal research goals include the comparative analysis of sequenced genomes and automatic methods for genome-scale annotation of gene functions. He also researches in the application of comparative genomics for phylogenetic analysis, reconstruction of ancestral life forms and building large-scale evolutionary scenarios, as well as mathematical modeling of genome evolution. Koonin's research also investigates computational study of the major transitions in the evolution of life, such as the origin of eukaryotes, the evolution of eukaryotic signaling, the virus world hypothesis, and developmental pathways from the comparative-genomic perspective.

Koonin is an advocate of the extended evolutionary synthesis. In 2011 he outlined his views on evolution in the book "The Logic of Chance: The Nature and Origin of Biological Evolution". In 2025, he contributed to the discovery of TIGR-Tas, a family of ancient RNA-guided DNA-targeting systems.

== Career ==
Koonin has worked as adjunct professor at the Georgia Institute of Technology, Boston University and the University of Haifa. From 2014, he served on the advisory editorial board of Trends in Genetics, and is co-Editor-in-Chief of the open access journal Biology Direct. He served on the editorial board of Bioinformatics from 1999 until 2001. Koonin is also an advisory board member in bioinformatics at Faculty of 1000. In 2016 he was elected to the National Academy of Sciences. In 2016, Semantic Scholar AI program included Koonin on its list of top ten most influential biomedical researchers.

== Political positions ==
In February 2022, he signed an open letter by Russian scientists condemning the 2022 Russian invasion of Ukraine, and renounced his membership in the Russian Academy of Sciences out of protest.

== Selected bibliography ==
- Dolja, Valerian V.; Krupovic, Mart; Koonin, Eugene V. (2020-08-25). "Deep Roots and Splendid Boughs of the Global Plant Virome" (PDF). Annual Review of Phytopathology. 58 (1). Annual Reviews: 23–53. Bibcode:2020AnRvP..58...23D. doi:10.1146/annurev-phyto-030320-041346. ISSN 0066-4286. PMID 32459570. S2CID 218974980. HAL Id: 02861246.
- Dolja, Valerian V.; Karasev, Alexander V.; Koonin, Eugene V. (1994). "Molecular Biology and Evolution of Closteroviruses: Sophisticated Build-up of Large RNA Genomes". Annual Review of Phytopathology. 32 (1). Annual Reviews: 261–285. Bibcode:1994AnRvP..32..261D. doi:10.1146/annurev.py.32.090194.001401. ISSN 0066-4286.
- Makarova, Kira S.; Wolf, Yuri I.; Alkhnbashi, Omer S.; Costa, Fabrizio; Shah, Shiraz A.; Saunders, Sita J.; Barrangou, Rodolphe; Brouns, Stan J. J.; Charpentier, Emmanuelle; Haft, Daniel H.; Horvath, Philippe; Moineau, Sylvain; Mojica, Francisco J. M.; Terns, Rebecca M.; Terns, Michael P.; White, Malcolm F.; Yakunin, Alexander F.; Garrett, Roger A.; van der Oost, John; Backofen, Rolf; Koonin, Eugene V. (2015-09-28). "An updated evolutionary classification of CRISPR–Cas systems". Nature Reviews Microbiology. 13 (11). Nature Portfolio: 722–736. doi:10.1038/nrmicro3569. ISSN 1740-1526. PMC 5426118. PMID 26411297.
- Gabaldón, Toni; Koonin, Eugene V. (2013-04-04). "Functional and evolutionary implications of gene orthology". Nature Reviews Genetics. 14 (5). Nature Portfolio: 360–366. doi:10.1038/nrg3456. ISSN 1471-0056. PMC 5877793. PMID 23552219.
