= Pipkins (disambiguation) =

Pipkins is a British children's television programme

Pipkins may also refer to:

== People ==
- Lenzy Pipkins (born 1993), American football player
- Ondre Pipkins (born 1994), American football player
- Trey Pipkins (born 1996), American football player

== Other ==
- The Pipkins, British musical duo

== See also ==
- Pipkin (disambiguation)
