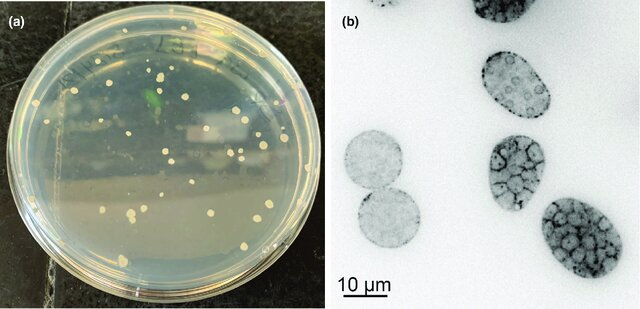
- Spizellomyces punctatus

Scientific classification
- Kingdom: Fungi
- Division: Chytridiomycota
- Class: Chytridiomycetes
- Order: Spizellomycetales
- Family: Spizellomycetaceae
- Genus: Spizellomyces
- Species: S. punctatus

Binomial name
- Spizellomyces punctatus (W.J. Koch) D.J.S. Barr

= Spizellomyces punctatus =

Chytrid fungal species

Spizellomyces punctatus is a chytrid fungus living in soil. It is a saprotrophic fungus that colonizes decaying plant material. Being an early diverging fungus, S. punctatus retains ancestral cellular features that are also found in animals and amoebae. Its pathogenic relatives, Batrachochytrium dendrobatidis and B. salamandrivorans, infect amphibians and cause global biodiversity loss. The pure culture of S. punctatus was first obtained by William J. Koch (named Phlyctochytrium punctatum).

== Genome ==
The genome of S. punctatus strain DAOM BR117 was sequenced under the Origins of Multicellularity project. Its genome size is about 24.13 Mb with a GC content of 47.6%. The genome has 9,424 predicted transcripts and 8,952 predicted protein-coding genes. The DDBJ/EMBL/GenBank accession number is ACOE00000000.

== Genetic transformation ==
=== Agrobacterium-Mediated Transformation ===
Genetic transformation of S. punctatus zoospores by plant pathogen Agrobacterium tumefaciens EHA105 strain is successfully established. Several selection markers have been tested. The growth of S. punctatus is not inhibited by Geneticin (G418), Puromycin, and Phleomycin D10 (Zeocin) up to 800 mg/L. 200 mg/L Hygromycin and 800 mg/L Nourseothricin (CloNAT) completely inhibit S. punctatus growth. The scientists who develop this protocol use Hygromycin as the selection marker. S. punctatus HSP70 and H2B promoters drive sufficient gene expression for Hygromycin resistance and GFP expression tested in yeast. Controlled by stronger H2B promoter, however, GFP may not be successfully folded in S. punctatus. Other fluorescent proteins, including tdTomato, mClover3, mCitrine, and mCerulean3, are functional in S. punctatus.

=== Electroporation ===
A high-efficiency electroporation protocol for S.punctatus and two related chytrids species B. dendrobatidis and B. salamandrivorans has also been established. The optimal voltage for S. punctatus is 1000 V. The efficiency is about 95% using synchronized zoospores. Electroporation using unsynchronized zoospores can also reach more than 80% efficiency.

== Life cycle ==
S.punctatus globular zoospores (3–5 mm) lacks a cell wall. The zoospores can swim with a motile cilium (20–24 mm) or crawl on surfaces by actin-filled pseudopods.

During encystment, the cilium is disassembled first via axoneme internalization. The initiation of this process is actin-dependent. The axoneme remains intact during internalization and the axonemal tubulin is degraded at least in part by the proteasome. The cell wall is formed after axoneme internalization. Five modes of axoneme internalization occur in S. punctatus: severing, reeling in retraction, lash-around retraction, ciliary compartment loss retraction, and vesicular retraction. First, severing is referred to as cilium detachment. Second, reeling in retraction is concurrent with or without cortical rotation and termed body-twist retraction and straight-in retraction, respectively. Third, during lash-around retraction, the cilium wraps around outside the zoospore with merging of ciliary membrane and plasma membrane. On 120 kPa fibronectin-coated hydrogels, this lash-around retraction occurs within a second. Fourth, for ciliary compartment loss retraction, ciliary membrane expansion is followed by merging of the ciliary compartment with the plasma membrane. Fifth, vesicular retraction is the creation of an axoneme loop bulge within the ciliary membrane before internalization.

After the cilium is retracted, the cyst germinates and generates a germ tube. The germ tube is then extended to form the rhizoidal system. Finally, the cyst develops into a sporangium, a reproductive structure, and mitosis begins. After five to eight times of synchronous mitosis, 32 – 256 zoospores form in the sporangium. Ciliogenesis probably occurs before cellularization. After cellularization, the zoospores escapes from the sporangium under suitable environmental condition.

The timing of the cell cycle has been quantified using the S.punctatus expressing H2B-TdTomato controlled by H2B promoter under microscopy. The retraction of the cilium and the start of encysting happen within one hour. The germ tube appears in one to three hours. The first mitosis happens in eight to twelve hours. It finishes five to eight times of synchronous mitosis in thirty hours. The average cell cycle takes about 150 minutes. Each nuclear division is completed in 1 minute.

== Mitochondrial 5' tRNA editing ==
This species is notable for having mitochondrial 5′ tRNA editing, a rare modification that is only known to also exist in the Amoebozoa species Acanthamoeba castellanii and Chytridiomycota species Harpochytrium94, Harpochytrium105, Monoblepharella15, and Hyaloraphidium curvatum. S. punctatus mitochondrial genome encodes eight tRNAs that recognize lysine, aspartic acid, tryptophan, methionine, tyrosine, glutamine, proline, and leucine codons. tRNA^{Leu} recognizes the UAG codon as leucine instead of the stop codon.

tRNAs form secondary structures that are composed of helical stems. Predicted from mtDNA, mismatches are found in the first three nucleotides of the eight tRNA acceptor stems. Sequencing of the mature mitochondrial tRNAs showed the replacement of pyrimidines or purines by purines (A to G, U to G, U to A, and C to A) that restore the base pairing. The editing sites are always restricted to the first three positions.

The mitochondrial 5' tRNA editing of S.punctatus has been confirmed in vitro. Using mitochondrial extract, the 5' mismatches of synthetic tRNA transcripts are removed and nucleotides are incorporated in a 3' to 5' direction by using the 3' tRNA sequence as templates. The patterns of mitochondrial 5' tRNA editing are similar to those found in A. castellanii.

== Phytohormone receptor homologs ==
Ethylene and cytokinin receptors in plants are histidine kinases. Histidine kinases in fungi are hybrid histidine kinases due to the fusion of histidine kinase/histidine kinase-like ATPase catalytic domains (HK/HATPase domains) to the receiver domain. Ethylene and cytokinin receptor homologs are also found in several flagellated and unflagellated fungal genera, including Spizellomyces. In general, these two phytohormones are signaling molecules in plant biotic interactions. Ethylene and cytokinin receptors in early diversifying fungus may play important roles in colonizing land.

== Opsins ==
Two opsin types exist: Type 1 opsins are used by prokaryotes and by some algae (as a component of channelrhodopsins) and fungi, whereas animals use type 2 opsins. Type 2 opsins belong to Class A family of G-protein coupled receptors. Both types are seven-transmembrane receptors and bind covalently retinal as chromophore, which turns them into photoreceptors sensing light. However, both types are not related on the sequence level.

In other fungi such as Blastocladiella emersonii, a flagellated early-diverging fungus, type 1 opsins are used for phototaxis. However, in S. punctatus type 1 opsins do not exist, but a putative type 2 opsin. It shares with other G-protein-coupled receptors a number of conserved motifs and amino acids including the lysine corresponding to residue 296 in cattle rhodopsin, which is important for retinal binding and light sensing. It is as suggested by template-based structure modelling also structurally similar to animal type 2 opsins. At least computationally, it can bind retinal as chromophore. However, it prefers binding 9-cis-retinal, unlike most classical animal type 2 opsins, such as cattle rhodopsin, which binds 11-cis-retinal in the dark state. However, the biological function of the S. punctatus opsin is unknown. Whether it is indeed a type 2 opsin is also unclear, since it is absent from a comprehensive opsin pyhlogeny that covers as many opsins as possible. In principle, if it is a photoreceptor, it could have evolved light sensitivity, independently.

== Fanzor endonuclease ==
Fanzor is a protein encoded by eukaryotic transposons and is thought to have originated from TnpB, an effector of the prokaryotic RNA-guided system known as OMEGA. TnpB is also considered the putative ancestor of Cas12, an RNA-guided endonuclease utilized in the CRISPR-Cas system. This suggests a connection between Fz, TnpB, and Cas12, despite their different roles and context in prokaryotic and eukaryotic cells. Spizellomyces punctatus was used extensively to study the structure of Fanzor.
