= Biology Direct =

- Discipline: Biology
- Language: English
- Edited by: Eugene Koonin, Laura Landweber, David J. Lipman

Publication details
- Publisher: BioMed Central
- Impact factor: 4.04 (2013)

Standard abbreviations
- ISO 4: Biol. Direct

Indexing
- ISSN: 1745-6150

Links
- Journal homepage

Biology Direct is an online open access scientific journal that publishes original, peer-reviewed research papers, reviews, hypotheses, comments and discovery notes in biology. The journal is published by BioMed Central.

The journal follows a peer review system which is different from the traditional peer review system, which aims to give more responsibility to authors, and reduce sources of bias. Published articles include signed reviewer reports, and responses to the reports from the authors, to provide readers with an additional guide to the article.

== Purpose ==
Based on the information presented on their website: "Biology Direct's key aim is to provide authors and readers with an alternative to the traditional model of peer review. This includes making the author responsible for selecting potentially suitable reviewers for their manuscript, from the journal's Editorial Board; making the peer review process open rather than anonymous; and making the reviewers' reports public, thus increasing the responsibility of the referees and eliminating sources of abuse in the refereeing process."
