= Élie Faure =

French art historian and essayist

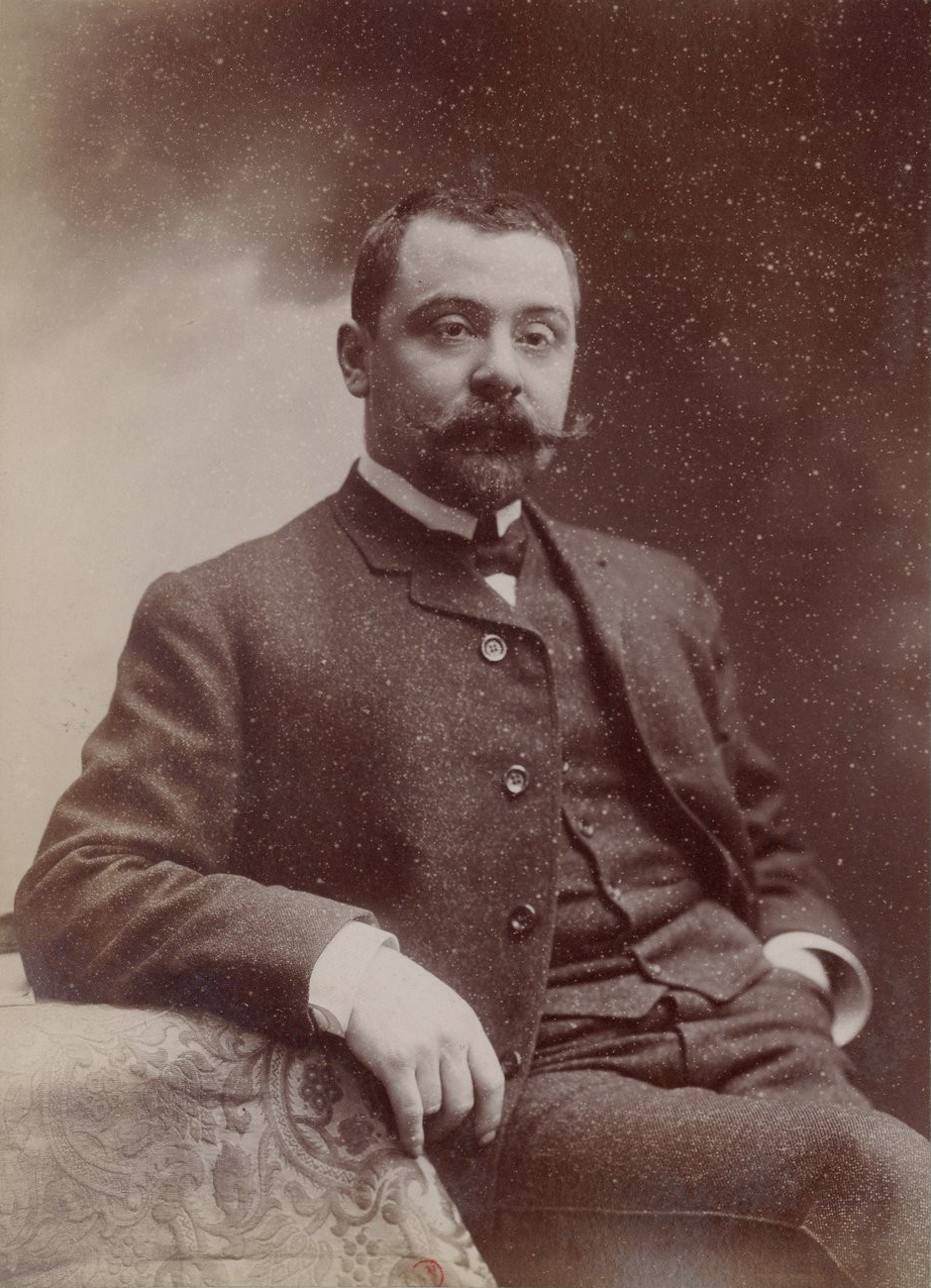
Élie Faure in 1900

Jacques Élie Faure (French pronunciation: [ʒak eli fɔʁ]; 4 April 1873 in Sainte-Foy-la-Grande, France – 29 October 1937 in Paris) was a French medical doctor, art historian and essayist.

He was called "the greatest art critic of the 1920s and 30s". He is the author of the History of Art, considered a historiographical pillar in the discipline.

== Biography ==
=== Youth and Training ===
Élie Faure was the son of Pierre Faure, a merchant, and Zéline Reclus. He was close to two of his uncles, namely the geographer and anarchist activist Élisée Reclus and the ethnologist Élie Reclus. In 1888, he joined his brothers Léonce and Jean-Louis in Paris and enrolled at the Lycée Henri-IV, where he had as classmates in philosophy class Léon Blum, R. Berthelot, Gustave Hervé, and Louis Laloy.

Passionate about painting, he often visited the Louvre and immersed himself in the works of his philosophy teacher, Henri Bergson.

With his baccalaureate in hand, he enrolled in the faculty of medicine and began practicing in working-class neighborhoods in Paris. He worked as an anesthesiologist and specialized in embalming with his brother Jean-Louis, a surgeon and gynecologist. Nevertheless, he continued to attend exhibitions and regularly visited workshops of painters and sculptors.

On 7 April 1896, he married Suzanne Gilard, daughter of the pastor of Eynesse. They had a daughter, Elisabeth, whom his friend, the painter Eugène Carrière, sketched in 1902. On 3 May 1899, Élie Faure presented his doctoral thesis in medicine, which dealt with an innovative treatment for lupus.

He also engaged in political battles of the time, siding with Dreyfus and participating in socialist movements.

=== Art historian ===
In 1902, Élie Faure began to publish articles in L'Aurore, a Parisian literary and socialist newspaper. He mainly wrote about his experiences of the then famous Salons (Société des Artistes Français, Société nationale des Beaux-Arts, Salon des Indépendants). During these times he met with Gustave Geffroy, Frantz and Francis Jourdain, Eugène Carrière, Antoine Bourdelle and Auguste Rodin.

He was passionate about Paul Cézanne and Diego Vélasquez, to whom he devoted his first book. Between 1905 and 1909, he delivered a series of lectures on the history of art at La Fraternelle university in the 3rd arrondissement of Paris. He drew from the lectures the content of his main work, History of Art, first published in 1909. This monumental work, which he reworked several times, held a lyrical style and retraced the evolution of architecture, sculpture, painting and domestic arts from prehistory to the beginning of the 20th century. However, it obscured the academic art of the second half of the 19th century.

In 1904, he entered the honorary committee of the Salon d'Automne and organized several exhibitions for them.

In Les Constructeurs (1914), he examined the role of artists in society and the influence of thinkers like Michelet and Nietzsche.

=== Participation in the First World War ===
He was drafted as a military doctor at the front line during the First World War. He was quickly traumatized by the fighting and moved to the rear of the battlefield; he was diagnosed with neurasthenia. He was back at the front for the Battle of the Somme as a doctor. In La Sainte Face (The Holy Face), published in 1917, he described the "ideas war aroused in him". The first part of the book, "Near the fire", retraces his time as a frontline doctor from August 1914 to August 1915. The second part, "Far from the fire", describes his convalescence in Paris and Côte d'Azur, with a visit to Paul Cézanne. The third part, "Under fire", was written in the Somme between August and December 1916.

=== The Interwar period ===
Once demobilized, he resumed writing and travelling. He also took interest in cinema, philosophy and history as with his writing a biography on Napoleon, published in 1921. In 1931, he traveled the world, during which he met the painter Diego Rivera in Mexico, discovered the United States, Japan, China, India and Egypt.

Élie Faure, worried about the rise of fascism during the 1930s, joined the committee of anti-fascist intellectuals after the anti-parliamentarist street protests in Paris organized by far-right leagues on the 6 February 1934 crisis. He supported the Republicans against Franco during the Spanish Civil War and visited combatants in Barcelona and Madrid. In 1936, he became co-chairman of the Committee for Aid to the Spanish People. At the beginning of 1937, he launched an appeal to Léon Blum in favor of Spain. He also signed a petition in favor of Spain in the newspaper l'Humanité in October 1937. His testimonies on the war in Spain were published after his death in Meditations catastrophiques.

He died of a heart attack in Paris on 29 October 1937. He was buried in his family cemetery in the village of Laurents in Saint-Antoine-de-Breuilh.

=== Friendship ===
Élie Faure "shared a brief and almost romantically intense friendship" with the painter Chaïm Soutine, whom he considered a genius. From 1927 onwards, he took the artist on trips with him, settled several of his debts, and bought a few of his works. He also devoted a monograph to him in 1929.

This close friendship was, however, cut short. Soutine fell in love with Faure's daughter Marie-Line, known as Zizou, and in 1930 Soutine and Faure fell out. Nevertheless, Faure wrote to him: "You were, you still are, apart from my two sons, the only man I love."

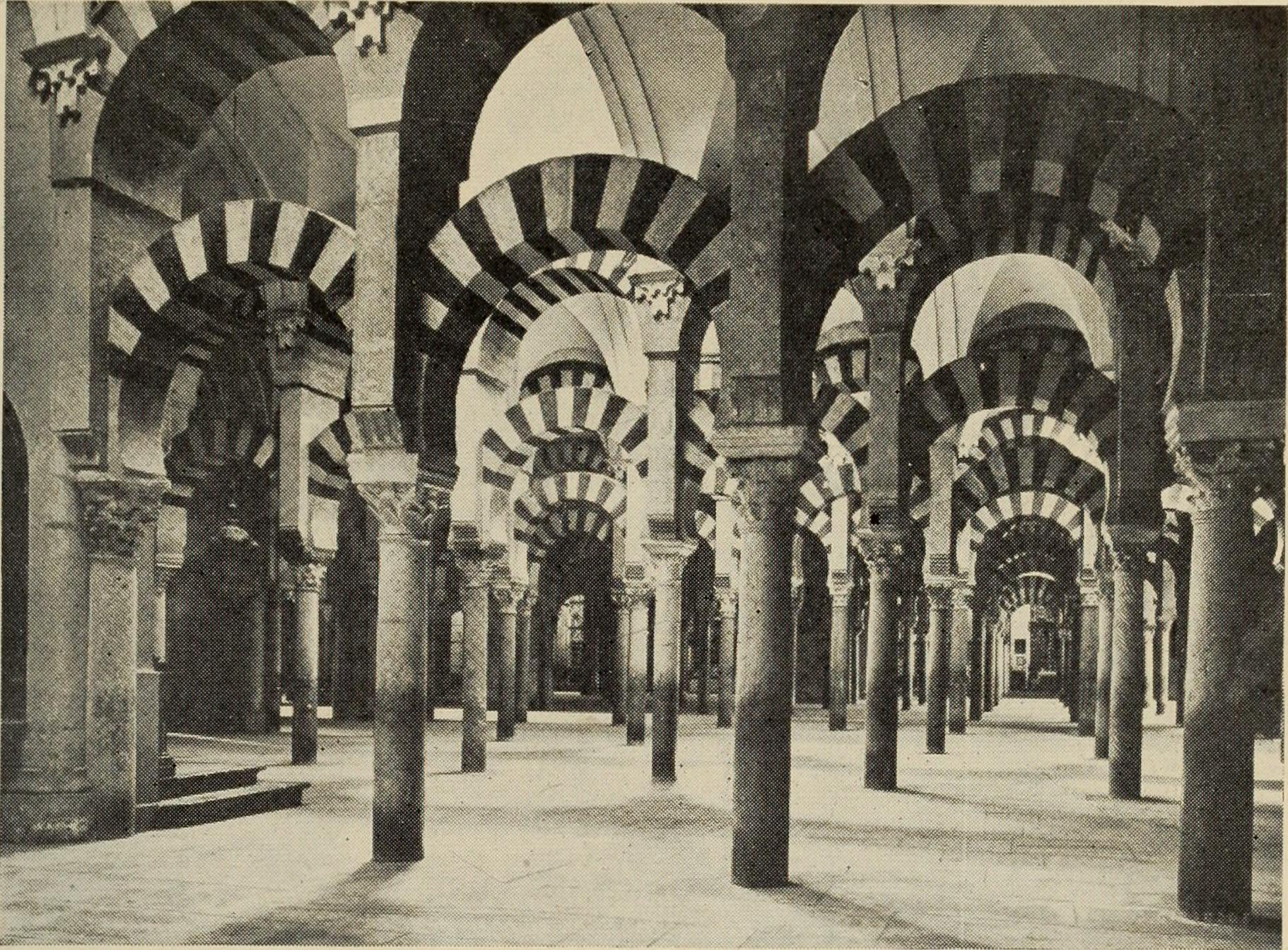
One illustration from Élie Faure's History of art (1921): Cordova (8th Century); interior of the great mosque

== Works ==
- Vélasquez (1903).
- Formes et Forces (1907).
- Eugène Carrière (1908).
- Les Constructeurs (1914).
- La Conquête (1917).
- La Sainte Face (1917).
- La Roue (1919).
- La Danse sur le Feu et l'Eau (1920).
- Napoléon (1921).
- Histoire de l'Art (1919–1921).
- L'Arbre d'Éden (1922).
- Cervantes (1926).
- L'Esprit des Formes (1927).
- Découverte de l'Archipel (1932).
- D'Autres Terres en Vue (1932).
- Mon Périple Suivi de Reflets dans le Sillage (1931). Critical edition by Juliette Hoffenberg, Seghers 1987, 10:18 1994.
- Équivalences (1951).
- Fonction du Cinéma: De la Cinéplastique à son Destin Social, 1921–1937 (1953, with a preface by Charles Chaplin).
- Méditations Catastrophiques (2006).

Translated into English

- Cézanne (1913, translated by Walter Pach).
- History of Art (1921–1930, translated by Walter Pach).
- The Art of Cineplastics (1923, translated by Walter Pach).
- Napoleon (1924, translated by Jeffery Eardley Marston).
- The Dance Over Fire and Water (1926, translated by John Gould Fletcher).
- The Italian Renaissance (1929).

Selected articles

- "Reflections on the Greek Genius," The Dial, Vol. LXXIII (1922).

== Miscellany ==
- In the opening scene of Jean-Luc Godard's film Pierrot le Fou (1965), Jean-Paul Belmondo's character sits in a bathtub reading Elie Faure's Histoire de l'art to his daughter.
- In Henry Miller's novels Tropic of Capricorn (novel), Plexus The Books in My Life and Nexus Miller speaks of Faure's works.
- Will Durant included Faure's 4-volume History of Art on his list of 100 Best Books for an Education.
