= Jean-Louis Faure (surgeon) =

French surgeon

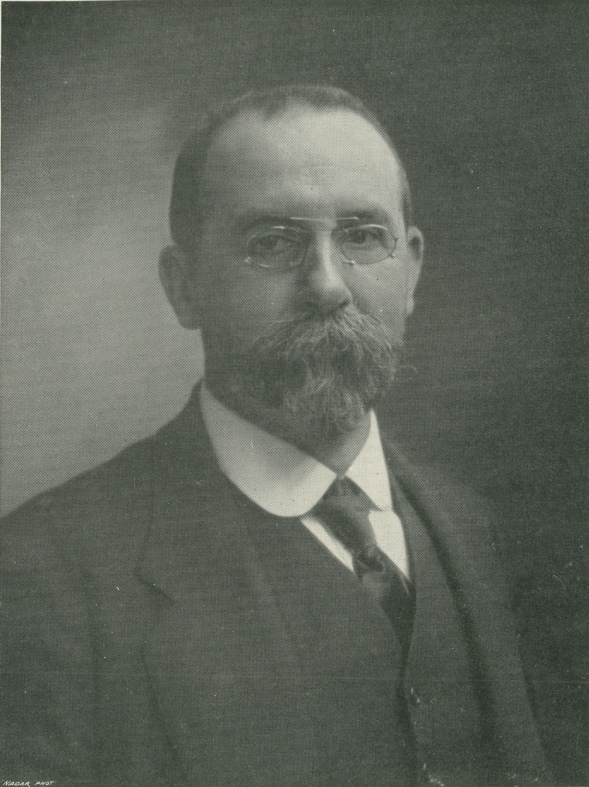
- Born: October 27, 1863; Sainte-Foy-la-Grande, Gironde, France
- Died: October 26, 1944 (aged 80); Saint-Laurent-des-Combes, Gironde, France
- Occupation: Surgeon

Jean-Louis Faure (French: [ʒɑ̃ lwi fɔʁ]; 27 October 1863 – 26 October 1944) was a French surgeon famous for improving methods and approaches in gynecological surgery. He was the elder brother of Élie Faure.

In October 1870, Jean-Louis Faure was enrolled in the local Protestant institution called Le collège protestant de Sainte–Foy–la–Grande, that his uncles, Élie Reclus and Paul Reclus (of the Reclus family), attended several decades earlier. In 1879, he entered the Lycée Louis-le-Grand in Paris in which his uncle, Élie Reclus, acted as a host for his boarding. In 1884, he enrolled in the Faculty of Medicine of Paris where he shifted his field of interest to surgery. He was accepted into the Hôpitaux de Paris as an intern in 1887 and he became the assistant of Paul Reclus at the Hôpital de la Pitié.

Faure published authoritative works on gynecological surgery for over thirty years. In 1918, he replaced Samuel Jean Pozzi as the chair of the gynecological clinic at the Faculty of Medicine of Paris. He was elected member of the Académie Nationale de Médecine in 1924 and the president of the Académie nationale de chirurgie in 1925.

He was a member of the committee of sponsors for Redressement Français in 1927 and also a member of the board of directors pertaining to funding for the National Republican Propaganda Center.

Faure also presided over the Civic League, which was active between 1934 and 1935, which is a part of a net work of association for national unity under Marie-Jean-Lucien Lacaze.

In 1932, he participated in the polar expedition to Greenland decided in 1930 in Stockholm by the general assembly of the International Geodesic and Geophysical Union.

== Bibliography ==
- En marge de la chirurgie, 1927
- Au Groenland avec Charcot, 1933.
