= Eugène Faure =

French painter

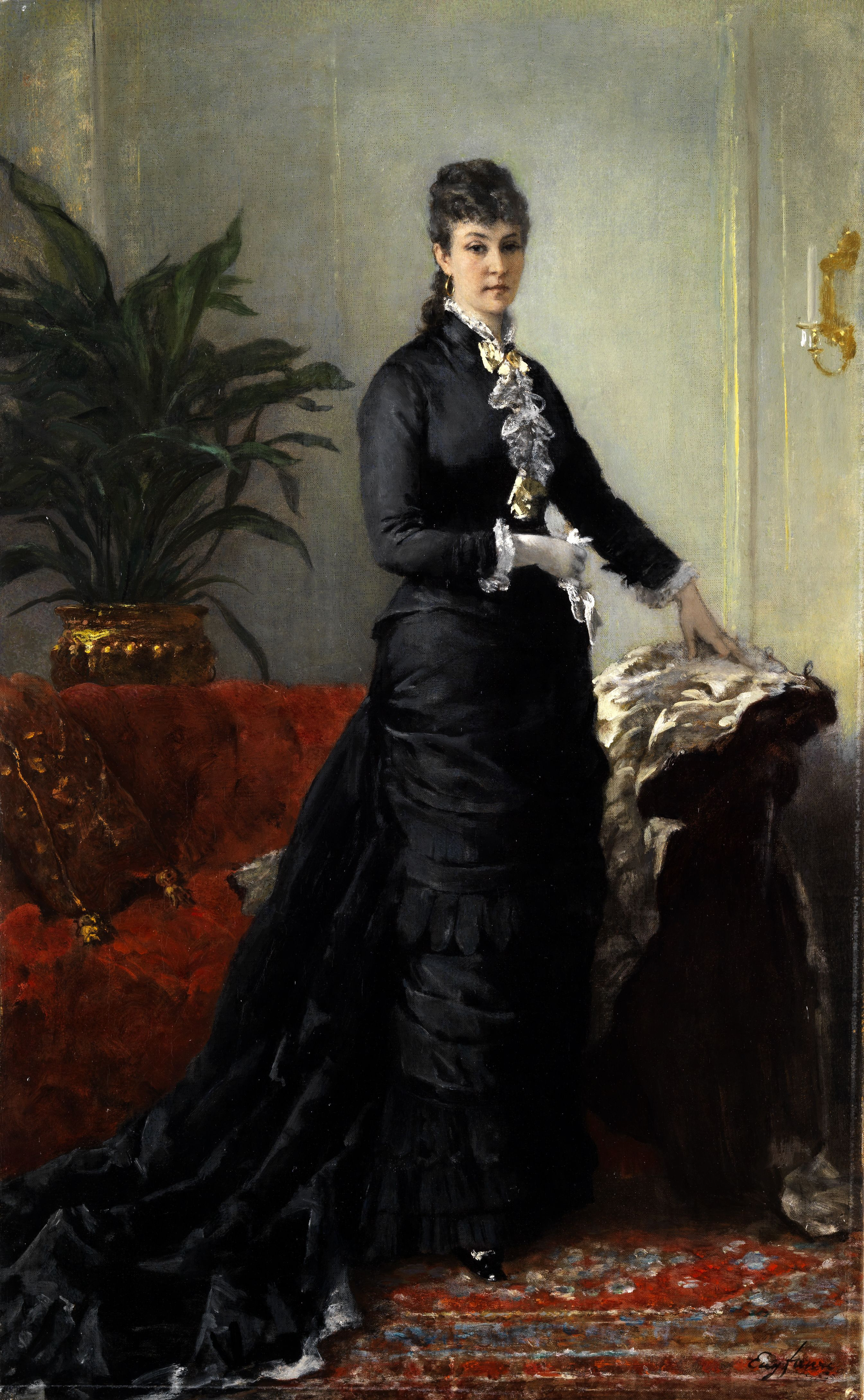
A young woman in a long black dress, ca. 1878

Eugène Faure(1822-1879) was a French painter of allegories, mythological subjects, and portraits.

He was born at Seyssinet, near Grenoble, in 1822. He studied under David d'Angers and Rude, and his first work, a landscape, now in the Grenoble Museum, appeared at the Salon of 1847. He died in Paris in 1879. The following are his chief works:

- Dreams of Youth. 1857.
- First Steps in Love. 1861.
- Confidence. 1863.
- Eve. 1864.
- La Source. 1878.
