= Eynesse =

- Commune
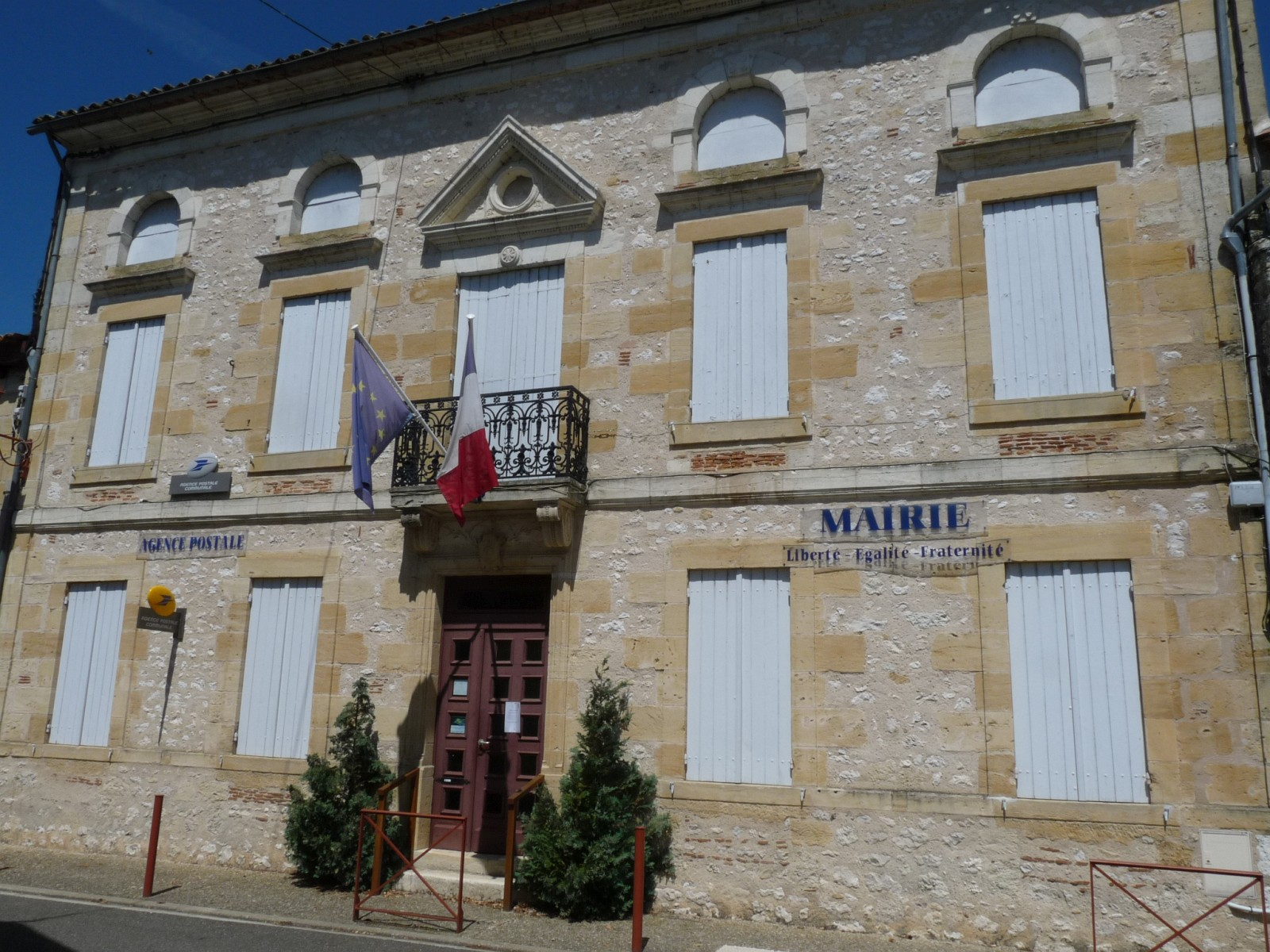
- The town hall in Eynesse
- Location of Eynesse
- Location within France Location within Nouvelle-Aquitaine
- Coordinates: 44°49′34″N 0°09′19″E
- Country: France
- Region: Nouvelle-Aquitaine
- Department: Gironde
- Arrondissement: Libourne
- Canton: Le Réolais et Les Bastides
- Intercommunality: Pays Foyen

Government
  - Mayor (2020–2026): Gérard Dufour
- Area^{1}: 7.59 km^{2} (2.93 sq mi)
- Elevation: 10 m (33 ft)
- Highest elevation: 111 m (364 ft)
- Lowest elevation: 8 m (26 ft)
- Population (2023): 581
  - Density: 76.5/km^{2} (198/sq mi)
- Time zone: UTC+01:00 (CET)
  - Summer (DST): UTC+02:00 (CEST)
- INSEE/Postal code: 33160 /33220
- ^{1} French Land Register data, which excludes lakes, ponds, glaciers > 1 km^{2} (0.386 sq mi or 247 acres) and river estuaries.

Eynesse (French pronunciation: [ɛnɛs]; Occitan: Aineça) is a commune in the Gironde department in southwestern France.

== Population ==
Historical population
| Year | Pop. | ±% p.a. |
|---|---|---|
| 1968 | 577 | — |
| 1975 | 542 | −0.89% |
| 1982 | 512 | −0.81% |
| 1990 | 526 | +0.34% |
| 1999 | 477 | −1.08% |
| 2007 | 559 | +2.00% |
| 2012 | 581 | +0.78% |
| 2017 | 587 | +0.21% |
| 2023 | 581 | −0.17% |
Source: INSEE

== See also ==
- Communes of the Gironde department
