= Vadim I. Agol =

Russian virologist and geneticist

Vadim Izrailevich Agol (Russian: Вадим Израилевич Агол; b. March 12, 1929 in Moscow) is a Soviet Russian virologist and geneticist. He was given the distinction of Honored Scientist of the Russian Federation in 1999.

== Career ==
Agol was the son of the geneticist Izrail Agol who was executed during Stalin's regime. Vadim graduated from the First Moscow State Medical University in 1951. From 1956 he worked at the Chumakov Institute of Poliomyelitis and Viral Encephalitides, and from 1970 he was a professor at the Department of Virology, Lomonosov Moscow State University.

== Distinctions ==
Agol was elected a Corresponding Member of the USSR Academy of Medical Sciences in 1986. From 1994 to 1999, he was a Soros Professor.

He was elected a Corresponding Member of the Russian Academy of Sciences in 1997, and a Foreign Member of the Bulgarian Academy of Sciences in 2008.

He is a recipient of the 2013 Institute of Human Virology Lifetime Achievement Award for Scientific Contributions.
