= Denise Soriano-Boucherit =

French woman cellist

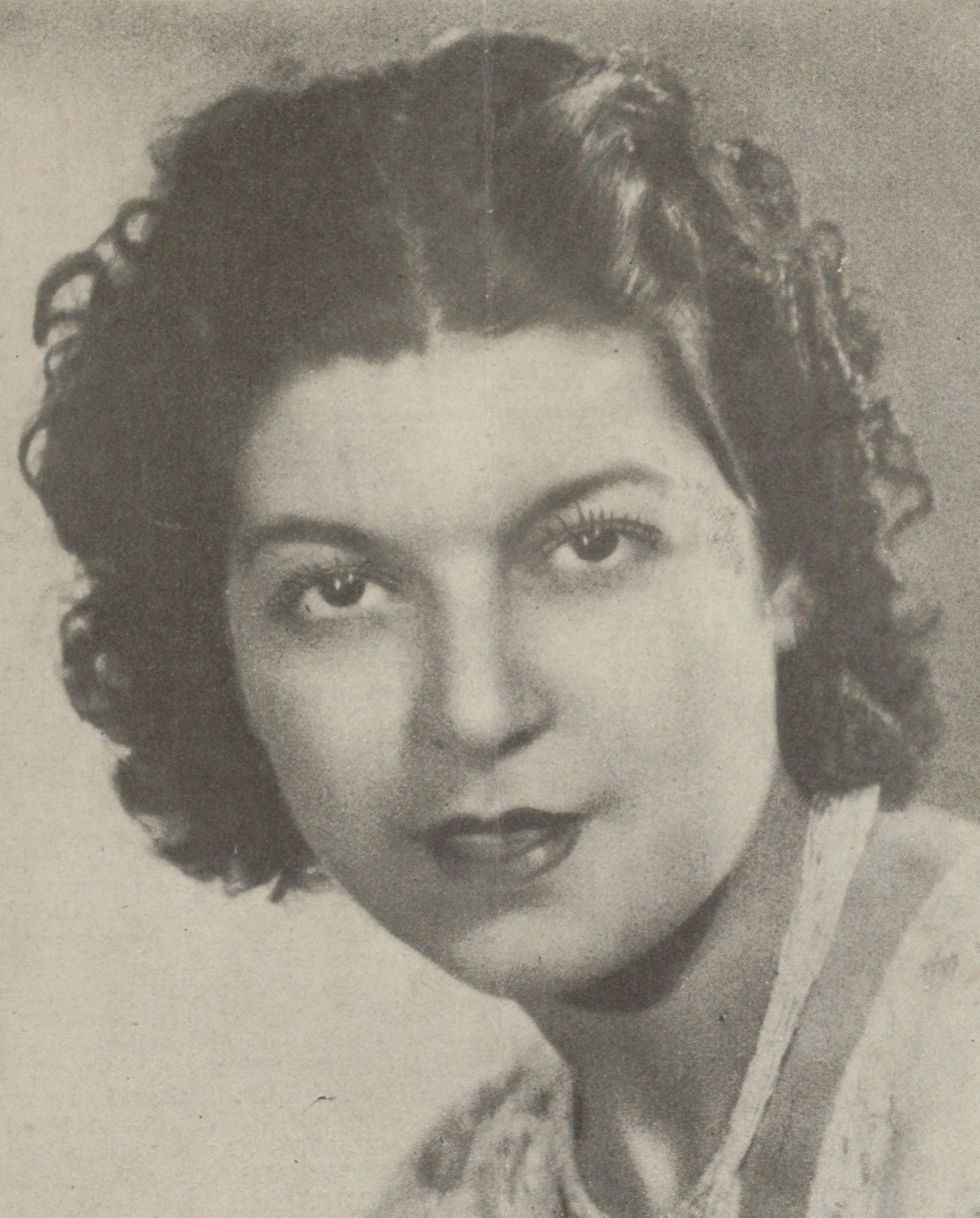
Denise Soriano-Boucherit

Denise Soriano-Boucherit (15 January 1916 – 5 March 2006) was a French violinist.

== Life ==
Born in Cairo, after the death of her father, who died when she was five years old, Soriano moved with her mother and siblings to her grandfather in Tuscany and from the age of six had violin lessons with Ugo Bianchi at the Pisa Conservatory. In 1928, the family moved to Paris, where Soriano first attended the École Normale de Musique. She then studied at the Conservatoire de Paris with Jules Boucherit until 1934. At the age of 16, she was awarded the first prize in violin at the Paris Conservatoire and the Prix Candide two years later, but she was denounced as Jewish in 1942, forcing her to go into hiding and interrupt her career at the age of 18 during the Occupation.

Jules Boucherit, her professor at the Conservatoire, hid and protected her, along with other young Jewish musicians. She married him in 1956, several years after the end of the war. In December 1994, she received, in the name of her husband who died in 1962, the Righteous Among the Nations Medal that the State of Israel Yad Vashem (Committee of Jerusalem) awarded him posthumously.

She played and recorded with many virtuosos, including Alfred Cortot, and Jacques Thibaud, who saw in her "the only magnificent violinist who can claim the succession of the late Ginette Neveu". She also devoted many years (1962–1985) to teaching in various schools.

She made her last public appearance in 2004, with the Soriano Quartet, which has performed every year since the 1990s, during the month of May, in the Marie-Antoinette Hall of the Saint-James & Albany Hotel on Rue de Rivoli in Paris.

Soriano-Boucherit died in Paris at the age of 90.

She was philosopher Marc Soriano's sister.
