= Alain-Jacques Valleron =

French scientist and professor

- Born: August 24, 1943 (age 82)
- Occupation: Professor

Alain-Jacques Valleron (born 24 August 1943 in Neuilly-sur-Seine (Hauts-de-Seine) is professor emeritus at the Pierre-et-Marie-Curie University and a member of the French Academy of sciences, of which he was Delegate for Scientific Information and Communication. He is the founder of the "Sentinel Network".

He is a graduate of the École polytechnique (1963) and holds a PhD in Science.

He was a researcher at Inserm from 1966 to 1981. Professor of Biomathematics at the University of Paris 7 from 1981 to 1991, Professor of Biostatistics / Medical Informatics at the Pierre et marie Curie Faculty of Medicine from 1991 to 2013 and hospital practitioner at Saint-Antoine Hospital (Paris).

He was Director of the Biostatistics Laboratory at the University of Paris 7 (1974–1981), the Inserm Research Unit 263 "Biomathematics and Biostatistics" (1981–1995), the Cooperative Data Centre on the Epidemiology of Human Immunodeficiency (1988–1991), the Inserm Research Unit 444 "Epidemiology and Information Sciences" from 1995 to 2004. He was also in charge of the Public Health Unit at Saint Antoine Hospital in Paris from 1991 to 2000.

In 1974, he created the DEA (master 2) in Biomathematics, which was the first postgraduate scientific training preparing for research in all information sciences applied to biomedicine (biostatistics, modelling, medical informatics, bioinformatics, biomedical image analysis). From 1998 to 2010 he directed the Doctoral School of Public Health of the Universities Pierre and Marie Curie and Denis Diderot (ED 393)

== Scientific works ==
Throughout his scientific career, Alain-Jacques Valleron has worked at the interface between information sciences and biomedicine. His first work will lead him to the creation of a platform for simulating the cell cycle and kinetics in the context of cancer. This allows him to map the variability in the duration of cell cycle phases and to model their consequences on the development of chemotherapy or radiotherapy treatments. Since the 1980s, he has been developing information systems and statistical or computer models to describe, model, detect in real time and predict the dynamics of epidemics, particularly emerging diseases. The diseases concerned are in particular influenza (monitored, as well as other health indicators, by the Sentinel network he created in 1984) and frequent communicable diseases in children, AIDS and viral hepatitis, Creutzfeldt-Jakob disease, SARS (Severe Acute Respiratory Syndrome)... Alain-Jacques Valleron has always placed his research at the intersection of life sciences, particularly epidemiology, and information sciences.

He is the author of numerous scientific articles and biostatistics books for medical students.

== Awards and honours ==
- Claude Bernard Grand Prize for Medical Research of the City of Paris (1995)
- Institute of Health Sciences Public Health Award (2003)
- Grand Prize of the Foundation for Medical Research (2005)
- Officier of the Légion d'Honneur
- Commandeur in the Ordre des Palmes Académiques
