= Foray (surname) =

Foray is a surname. Notable people with the surname include:

- Cyril Foray (1934–2003), Sierra Leonean educator, politician, diplomat and historian
- Dominique Foray (21st century), French economist
- June Foray (1917–2017), American voice actress
- Kenny Foray (born 1984), French motorcycle racer

== See also ==
- Foray, a traditional method of law enforcement in Poland
