= Guy Olivier Faure =

French professor and researcher

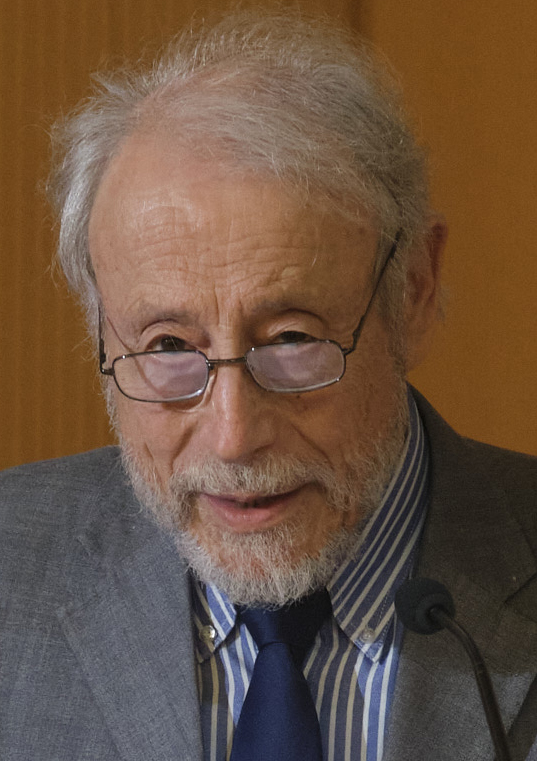
- Born: 1943 (age 82–83); France
- Education: Sorbonne University
- Employer(s): CERIS-ULB, The Diplomatic School, Brussels
- Organization(s): CERIS-ULB, The Diplomatic School, Brussels

Guy Olivier Faure (born in 1943 in France) is a professor of International Negotiation. He is currently president of the Brussels Diplomatic School (ULB/CERIS).

== Academic and field work ==
Faure is a professor and researcher on “International Negotiation”, “Conflict Resolution”, and “Strategic Thinking and Action”, which are subjects he has introduced and taught at the Sorbonne University, Paris. He is a member of the editorial board of the three major international journals dealing with negotiation theory and practice: Group Decision and Negotiation (New York),Group Decision and Negotiation, International Negotiation (Washington) and Negotiation Journal (Harvard). He is a member of the editorial boards of two major scientific book series: International Negotiation (Brill Academic Publisher); Advances in Group Decision and Negotiation (Springer).

He is a member of the steering committee of PIN/GIGA, Hamburg, a program on international negotiation processes that links together 3000 people involved in the domain. He has worked on peace issues, especially in French-German cooperation programs within the framework of the international treaty of friendship and cooperation signed in 1963 between these two countries. He has also contributed to field actions on peace making and reconciliation with NGOs in the Middle East.

His major research interests are in diplomatic negotiations, focusing on strategies and intercultural issues. For over 20 years, he has been involved with Chinese business issues at the CEIBS (China- Europe International Business School, Shanghai). He has published research on multilateral negotiations, problem resolution and problem transformation. He is also concerned with developing interdisciplinary approaches in such domains as terrorism, and engages in consulting and training activities with governments and international organizations. Among them: The United Nations; UNESCO; the European Union; the World Trade Organization (WTO).

He is referenced in the Diplomat's Dictionary published by the National Defense University Press, Washington, 1994. He has authored, co-authored and edited 19 books and over 120 articles. His works have been published in twelve different languages.

He was quoted among the "2000 Outstanding Scholars of the 21st Century" by the International Biographical Centre of Cambridge (United-Kingdom).

Faure has conducted negotiation training and consulting projects for major Western and Chinese companies such as Générale des Eaux, Framatome, Thomson-CSF, Spotimage, Alcatel, Dassault, Lafarge, GEC-Alsthom, SNECMA, Air Liquide, Cegelec, Carrefour, Chargeurs, Camaïeu, L’Oreal, Chanel, Schlumberger, Schneider Electric, Thalès, Bongrain, Auchan, Nestlé, ICI, General Electric, Bayer, Philips, AT&T, Siemens, Henkel, General Motors, Lucent Technologies, Gillette, TCL, CNOOC-Shell, CITIC, China Telecom and XENIRO.

== Published books and articles ==
- Culture and Negotiation, (with J.Z. Rubin) Newbury Park, Calif., Sage, 1993. Translated into Chinese as Wen Hua Yu Tan Pan (Culture and Negotiation), China Social Science Documentation Publishing House, Chinese Academy of Social Sciences, Beijing, 2001.
- Négociation internationale et pratique des affaires en Chine (avec Philippe Béraud et Jean-Louis Perrault). Paris, Maisonneuve et Larose, 2007.
- La négociation: situations et problématiques (with Mermet L., Touzard H., Dupont C.). Paris, Editions Dunod, 2000.
- How People Negotiate: The Resolution of Conflicts in Different Cultures. Dordrechts, The Netherlands, Kluwer Academic Publishers, 2003.
- Escalation and Negotiation in International Conflicts (with I.W. Zartman) (Cambridge University Press, 2005)
- La négociation : regards sur sa diversité. Paris, Publibook, 2005.
- Negotiating with Terrorists: Strategy, Tactics and Politics. (with I.W. Zartman). New York, Routledge, 2010.
- Engaging Extremists: States and Terrorists Negotiating Ends and Means (with I.W. Zartman). Washington, United States Institute of Peace, 2010.
- Unfinished Business: Preventing International Negotiations from Failure (with F. Cede). Georgia University Press, 2011
- Talking to terrorists. Washington, United States Institute of Peace, 2011. (with Byman, Perry, Zartman)
- Terrorism: Negotiating at the Edge of the Abyss in P.T. Coleman, M. Deutsch, E.C. Marcus, The handbook of Conflict Resolution: Theory and Practice. San Francisco, Jossey-Bass, 2014
- Negotiating Hostages with Terrorists: Paradoxes and Dilemmas. International Negotiation, 2015.
- The November Paris attack: an assessment. PINPoints, N° 42, 2016.
- Modernization with Chinese Characteristics: Sinicizing an Alien Model (with R. Cremer) Quarterly Journal of Chinese Studies. Vol. 5, 2017.
- China in Central Asia: Negotiating Cooperation for Mutual Benefits. (with F. Hampson and M. Troitskiy: Tug of War: negotiating security in Eurasia) (CIGI/McGill University Press, 2017)
- Negotiation and Violent Extremism: Why Engage and Why Not?. (with I. W. Zartman). The Ecology of Violent Extremism, 2018.
- Penser la guerre: La guerre asymétrique, le cas Daech. Réforme. Paris, N° 3764, 2018.
- The North Korean- US Summit: a great deception game but a first step. PINPoints, N° 46, 2019.
- Chinese Business Negotiations: closing the deal. (with I. W. Zartman: How Negotiations End) (Cambridge University Press, 2019)
- Negotiating information under conditions of high asymmetry: An exploration in the domain of interrogation. International Negotiation. Vol., 2022, 1-25.
- China's Negotiating Mindset and Strategies: Historical and Cultural Foundations. (with I. W. Zartman (eds)). Routledge, 2025
