= Georges Le Faure =

French writer (1856–1953)

- Born: 12 June 1856; Paris, France
- Died: 25 May 1953 (aged 96); Paris, France
- Occupation: Writer
- Spouse: Magdeleine Boucherit (m. 1906)

Georges Le Faure (French pronunciation: [ʒɔʁʒ lə fɔʁ]; 12 June 1856 – 25 May 1953) was a French writer who authored many popular novels, including early examples of science fiction. Born into poverty, he had a long writing career in many genres, including cinema. Among his best-known works is Les Aventures extraordinaires d'un savant russe, written with Henry de Graffigny. This multi-volume work follows a group of French and Russian astronauts as they explore the moon, Venus, Mars, and Jupiter. With its space travel and popularisation of science, it shows the influence of Jules Verne and anticipates Hard science fiction.

On 2 January 1906, le Faure married pianist and composer Magdeleine Boucherit.

== Bibliography ==
- 1901 : Nicolas Pepoff - 2 volumes - Bibliothèque des grandes aventures -Tallandier
- 1926 : Les Voleurs d'or, 1899, Livre national-Aventures et Voyages # 106
- 1902 - 1904 : Le Chevalier de Latude
- 1910 : Kadidjar la rouge, Les Beaux Romans Illustration de Gaston de Fonseca
- 1925 : La Course au milliard
- Un descendant de Robinson, Livre national-Aventures et Voyages # 24
- 1926 : Le Carré diabolique, Livre national-Aventures et Voyages # 86
- 1936 : La Brigande
- 1937 : La voix d'en face - Collection La Belle aventure # 7
- s. d. Madame Tambour , édition Emile Gaillard, 319.p, 100 illustrations by Georges Tiret-Bognet
