= Musée des Arts Décoratifs, Paris =

Museum within the Louvre, France

Musée des Arts Décoratifs

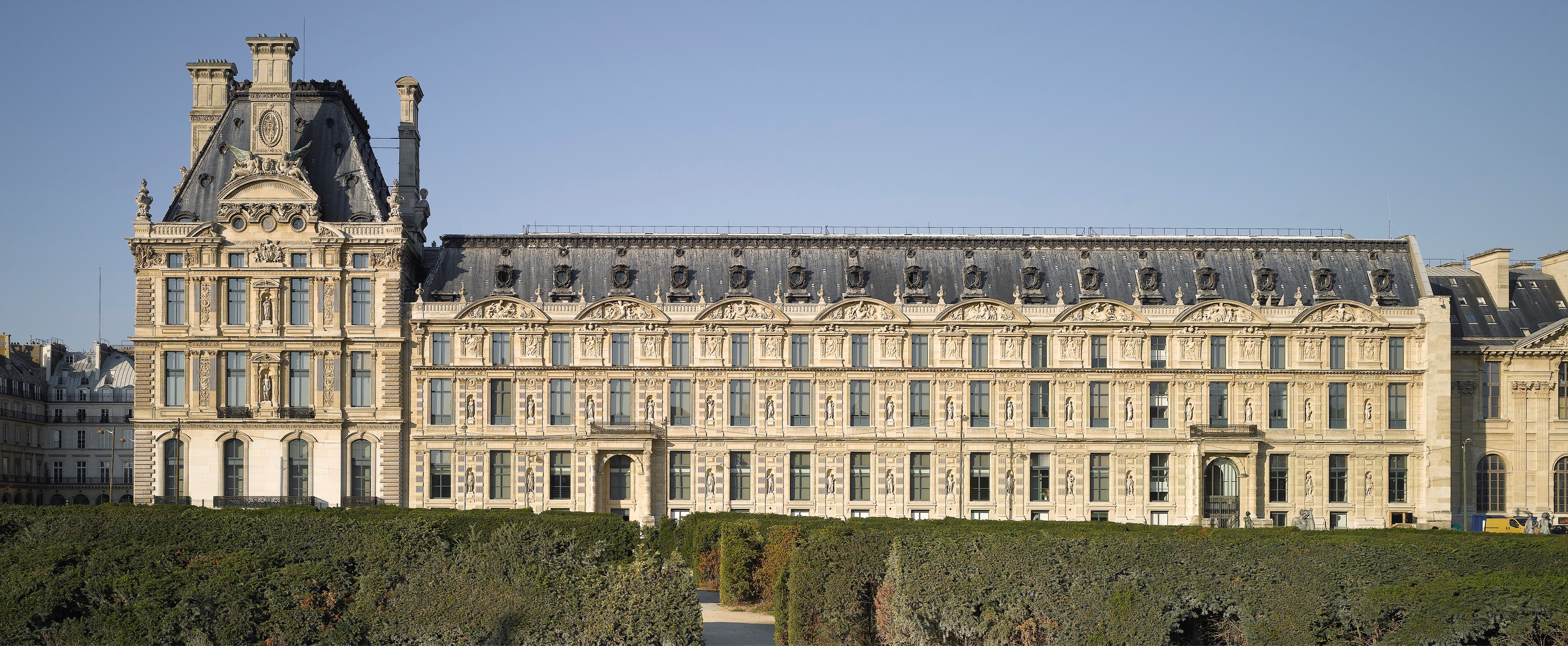
- Location in the Pavillon de Marsan, part of the Palais du Louvre
- Established: 1905
- Location: 107 Rue de Rivoli, Paris, France
- Coordinates: 48°51′46.02″N 2°20′2.79″E
- Type: Art museum
- Collections: furniture, tableware, graphic art, glass, ceramics, wallpaper, painting, sculpture
- Visitors: 901,593 (2022)
- Executive director: Christine Macel
- Architects: Louis Le Vau (1666), Hector Lequel (1870's), Gaston Redon (1890's)
- Website: madparis.fr

The Musée des Arts Décoratifs (French pronunciation: [myze dez‿aʁ dekɔʁatif], English: Museum of Decorative Arts) is a museum in Paris, France, dedicated to the exhibition and preservation of the decorative arts. Located in the city’s 1st arrondissement, the museum occupies the Pavillon de Marsan and the adjacent part of the north-western wing of the Palais du Louvre, along the Rue de Rivoli. With approximately one million objects in its collection, the Musée des Arts Décoratifs is the largest museum of decorative arts in continental Europe. It is one of three museums operated by the non-profit arts association MAD, founded in 1882.

== Displays ==
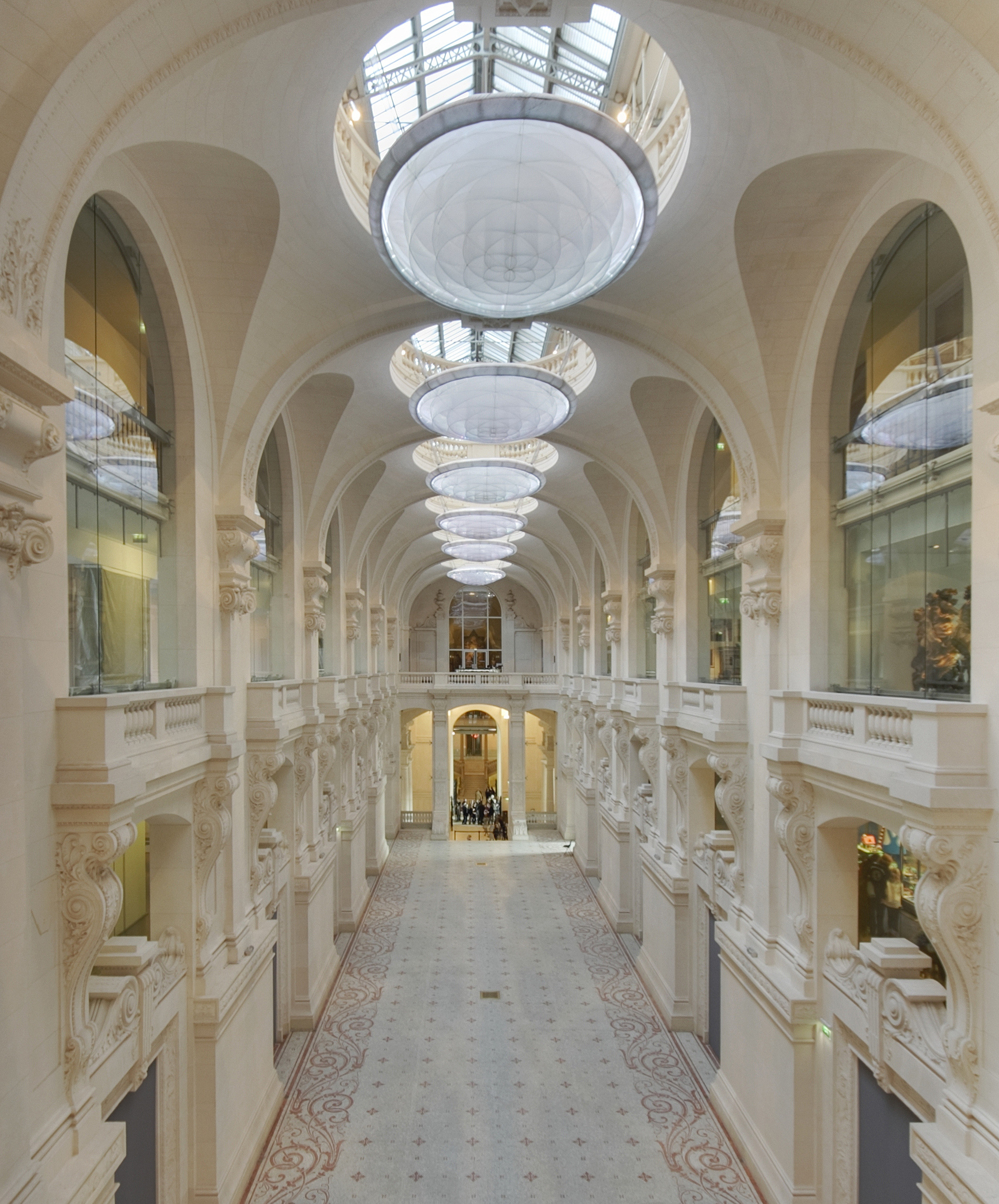
The museum's main gallery

The museum collection was founded in 1905 by members of the Union des Arts décoratifs ("Union of Decorative Arts"). The architect was Gaston Redon. It houses and displays furniture, interior design, altarpieces, religious paintings, objets d'arts, tapestries, wallpaper, ceramics and glassware, plus toys from the Middle Ages to the present day.

The museum's holdings range back to 13th-century Europe. Today's collection is primarily composed of French furniture, tableware, carpets such as those from Aubusson, porcelain such as that by the Manufacture nationale de Sèvres, and many glass pieces by René Lalique, Émile Gallé and many others. It includes numerous works in the Art Nouveau and Art Déco styles and modern examples by designers like Eileen Gray and Charlotte Perriand. Pieces by Camille Fauré can also be found in the permanent collection.

The period rooms are of interest to the public, with examples including part of Jeanne Lanvin's house (decorated by Albert-Armand Rateau [1884–1938] in the early 1920s) at 16 rue Barbet-de-Jouy in Paris. Others are graphic artist Eugène Grasset's dining room of 1880, and the 1752 Gold Cabinet of Avignon. There is also the 1875 bedroom of courtesan Lucie Émilie Delabigne, purportedly the inspiration for the main character in Émile Zola's novel Nana (1880).

There is a distinctive ceiling there, once owned by Jeanne Baptiste d'Albert de Luynes, mistress of the then duke of Savoy.

== Exhibitions ==
Some of the museum's vast number of exhibitions have been influential. Yvonne Brunhammer, a curator and then director of the museum for over four decades from the early 1950s, and the person who rediscovered Eileen Gray, organized the 1966 exhibition, "Les Années '25': Art Déco/Bauhaus/Stijl Esprit Nouveau". The exhibition served to coin "Art Déco", the term that came to describe design between the World Wars, particularly French modern design.

The museum is somewhat on a par with similar and venerable decorative-arts and design-focused institutions such as the more international Victoria and Albert Museum in London. It was also the inspiration for the Hewitt sisters' collection in the Cooper Union in New York City. However, due to many fine-art, publicity, fashion and design exhibitions mounted at the Paris museum, its focus has been diluted and caused its name, Musée des "Arts décoratifs", to become a misnomer. Thus, its name for popular use became MAD ("mode, arts, design" or, in English, "fashion, arts, design") in January 2016, even though the acronym is the same as MAD (Museum of Arts and Design) in New York City.

In 2021, the museum partnered with the Loewe Foundation and exhibited the finalists in the Loewe Craft Prize, which was won by Fanglu Lin that year.

== Renovation ==
The Musée des Arts décoratifs was closed from 1996 to 2006 due to a renovation of the building and of about 6,000 works from the collection; the renovation cost €35 million (about $45 million in 2006). The museum reopened on 15 September 2006. Béatrice Salmon, the current director and overseer of the restoration, has called the collection "the history of French taste and of the decorative arts and design in France" and has suggested: "People [in France] understand how to relate to paintings and sculpture in a museum, but they don't know how to interpret objects".

Pierre-Alexis Dumas, a principal of Hermès International and the president of the Fondation Hermès, was elected president in 2015. He succeeded Bruno Roger.

== See also ==
- List of museums in Paris
