= Andrée Fauré =

French ceramist and designer

Andrée Fauré (1904–1985) was a French ceramist and designer.

Fauré was part of the family business Atelier Fauré that produced ceramic works, located in Limoges, France. Her father Camille Fauré was a noted ceramist.

Her work is included in the collections of the Museum of Fine Arts Houston, Minneapolis Institute of Arts, Museum für Angewandte Kunst, Leipzig, and the Kirkland Museum of Fine & Decorative Art.
