= Sainte-Foy-la-Grande =

- Commune
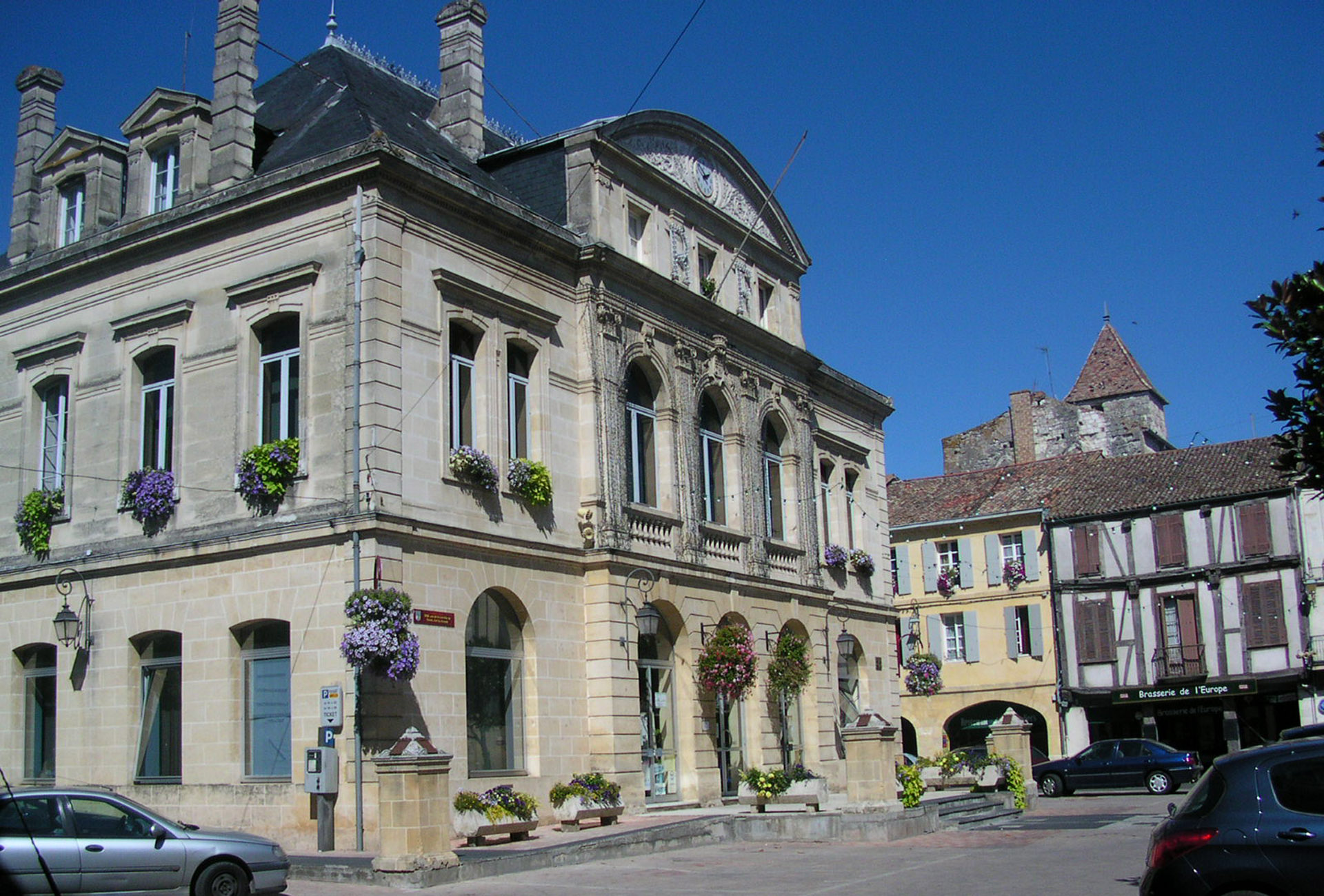
- The town hall in Sainte-Foy-la-Grande

- Coat of arms
- Location of Sainte-Foy-la-Grande
- Location within France Location within Nouvelle-Aquitaine
- Coordinates: 44°50′N 0°13′E
- Country: France
- Region: Nouvelle-Aquitaine
- Department: Gironde
- Arrondissement: Libourne
- Canton: Le Réolais et Les Bastides
- Intercommunality: Pays Foyen

Government
  - Mayor (2020–2026): Christelle Guionie
- Area^{1}: 0.51 km^{2} (0.20 sq mi)
- Highest elevation: 20 m (66 ft)
- Lowest elevation: 7 m (23 ft)
- Population (2023): 2,507
  - Density: 4,900/km^{2} (13,000/sq mi)
- Time zone: UTC+01:00 (CET)
  - Summer (DST): UTC+02:00 (CEST)
- INSEE/Postal code: 33402 /33220
- ^{1} French Land Register data, which excludes lakes, ponds, glaciers > 1 km^{2} (0.386 sq mi or 247 acres) and river estuaries.

Sainte-Foy-la-Grande (French pronunciation: [sɛ̃t fwa la ɡʁɑ̃d]; Occitan: Senta Fe la Granda) is a commune in the Gironde department in Nouvelle-Aquitaine in southwestern France. It is on the south bank of the Dordogne.

== History ==
The town was founded in 1076, near a priory where Sainte Foy was venerated. The town grew rapidly, and it was renamed to Sainte-Foy-la-Grande in 1363 to distinguish it from towns with similar names in the region. A lot of the town is made from medieval buildings which date back to the 15th century. The town was known for its wine trade and port, where ships left and carried caskets of wine to the United Kingdom and the Netherlands.

During the French reformation in the 16th century, Sainte-Foy became a centre of Calvinism, known as "Little Geneva"; held by the Huguenots during the French Wars of Religion, the town was fought over by both sides. Even after Protestant worship was banned by the 1685 Edict of Fontainebleau, the faith continued to be practised in secret, and in 1828, it became the location of one of the first Protestant schools established in France since 1685.

== Population ==
Historical population
Year	Pop.	±% p.a.
1968	3,186	—
1975	3,345	+0.70%
1982	2,967	−1.70%
1990	2,745	−0.97%
1999	2,788	+0.17%
2007	2,560	−1.06%
2012	2,327	−1.89%
2017	2,554	+1.88%
2023	2,507	−0.31%
Source: INSEE

== Notable natives and residents ==
- Gaston Aumoitte, croquet-player and olympic gold-medal winner, died here in 1957.
- Paul Broca, surgeon and anthropologist.
- Jacques Dejean, classical violinist, died here in 2013.
- Élie Faure, physician, art critic, writer, essayist, was born here in 1873.
- Louis Pierre Gratiolet, anatomist and zoologist, was born here in 1815.
- Rémi Lamerat, rugby union player, was born here in 1990.
- Pierre Larthomas (1915-2000), theatre theorist.
- Élie Reclus, ethnographer and anarchist, was born here.
- Élisée Reclus, geographer and anarchist, was born here.
- Onésime Reclus, his older brother and also a notable geographer, lived here for many years.

== See also ==
- Communes of the Gironde department
