= TIGR-Tas =

Gene editing system

TIGR-associated protein
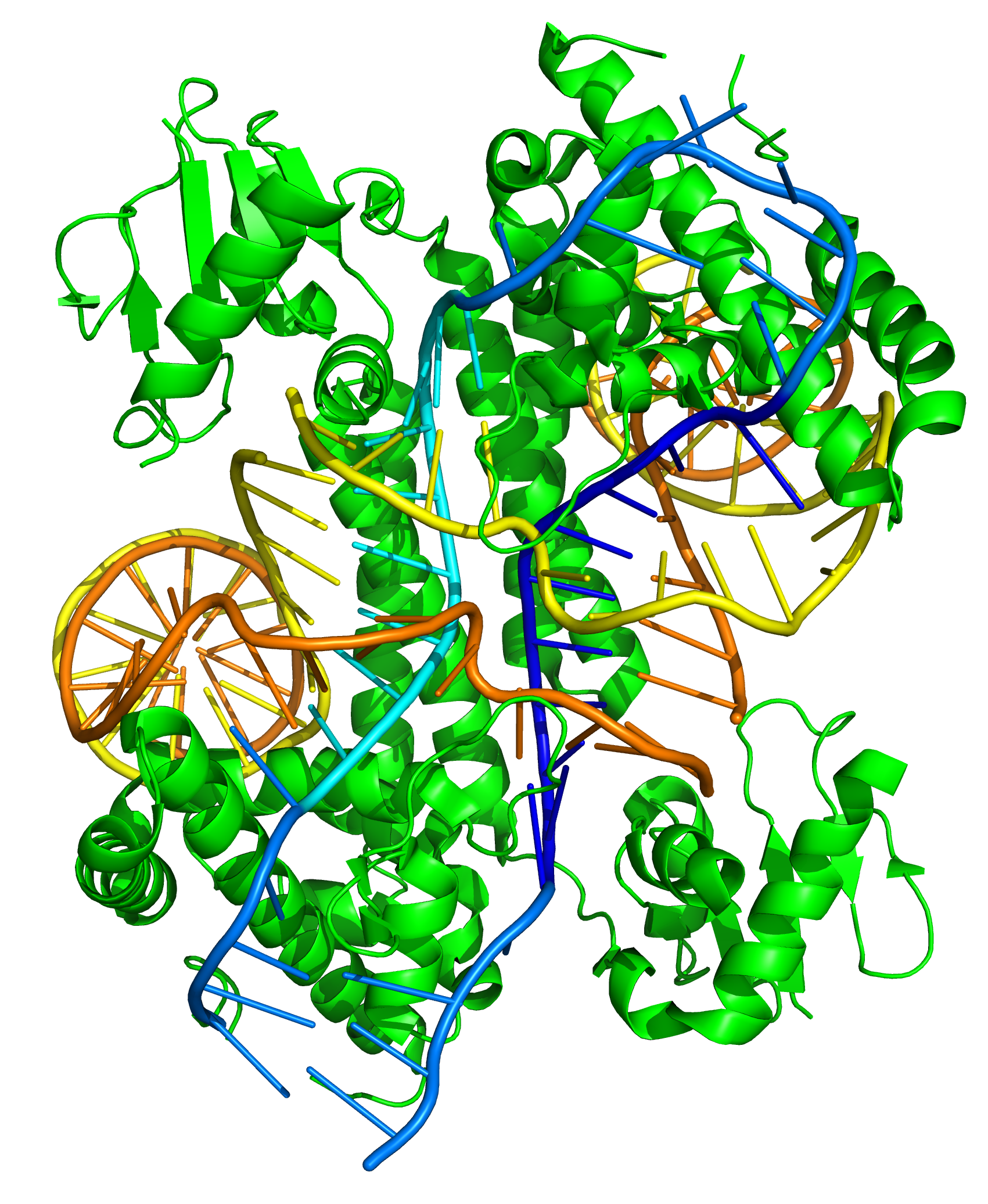
- TasR protein in complex with tigRNA and DNA.

Identifiers
- Symbol: .
- InterPro: .
Available protein structures:
- PDB: .
- AlphaFold: .

TIGR-Tas (Tandem Interspaced Guide RNA-associated proteins) is a family of RNA-guided DNA-targeting systems discovered in prokaryotes and their viruses. They were discovered by MIT and Harvard researchers and reported in the journal Science in February 2025. The discovery involved structural mining for domains similar to the RNA binding domain of Cas9, which identified new RNA-guided DNA-targeting systems in certain bacteriophages, archaeal viruses and parasitic bacteria of the phylum Patescibacteriota. The biological function of the system is not yet clear but could include defence against viruses and mobile genetic elements.

== Application for gene editing ==
Like CRISPR-Cas, the TIGR-Tas system can be used for gene editing by providing a synthetic guide RNAs to target a specific nucleic acid sequence. TasR or TasH proteins (functionally similar to Cas9) are guided to a specific DNA sequence by the tigRNA, where they cleave the DNA with their nuclease domains. In contrast to CRISPR-Cas gene editing in which the guide RNA only interacts with one of the two strands of DNA, the tigRNA interacts with both strands (dual-spacer instead of single-spacer). Additionally, the TIGR-Tas system is not dependent on a PAM sequence (a 2-6 base pair DNA motif following the DNA sequence targeted by Cas) for efficient DNA cleavage. The differences between TIGR-Tas and CRISPR-Cas provide potential benefits for gene editing. The lack of PAM motif requirements allows for more flexibility in targeting, the modularity of the effector proteins could allow easier modifications and the reduced size could make it easier to deliver into cells. However, certain variants of Cas9 already have PAM motifs that are so permissive that they barely limit the range of potential target sequences. As of June 2026 no other paper has been published that used the TIGR-Tas system for gene editing.

== See also ==
- Genome editing
- CRISPR gene editing
- Cas9
- Cas12
- Fanzor
