= Gunter Faure =

Canadian-American geochemist (1934–2025)

- Born: 1934
- Died: July 12, 2025 (aged 90–91); Dublin, Ohio (USA)
- Education: Massachusetts Institute of Technology
- Scientific career
- Workplaces: Ohio State University
- Thesis: (1961)

Gunter Faure was an American geochemist of Estonian origin. He was a scientist and teacher at the Ohio State University in the school of earth science. He obtained his PhD from the Massachusetts Institute of Technology in 1961. He died in Dublin, Ohio, on 12 July 2025.

== Books ==
- Introduction to Planetary Science: The Geological Perspective, Gunter Faure and Teresa M. Mensing, Springer, 2007, 526 pp. ISBN 978-1402052330
- Isotopes: Principles and Applications, Gunter Faure and Teresa M. Mensing, Wiley; 3rd edition, 2005.
- Origin of Igneous Rocks: The Isotopic Evidence, Gunter Faure, Springer, 2000, 496 pp. ISBN 978-3540677727 (2010 reprint ISBN 978-3642087288)
- Principles and Applications of Geochemistry, Gunter Faure, Prentice Hall, 1998, 2nd Ed., 625 pp. ISBN 978-0023364501
- Principles and Applications of Inorganic Geochemistry, Gunter Faure, Macmillan, 1991, 500pp. ISBN 978-0023364419
- The Transantarctic Mountains: Rocks, Ice, Meteorites and Water, Gunter Faure and Teresa M. Mensing, Springer, 2010, 804 pp. ISBN 978-1402084065
