= Lucie Dadat =

French artist

Lucie Dadat (1908–1991) was a French enamellist active in Limoges.

Dadat studied at the École Nationale des Arts Décoratifs de Limoges, now the École nationale supérieure d'art de Limoges. She joined the workshop of ceramicist Camille Fauré (1874–1956) in 1928 when the boutique was at 31, rue des Tanneries in Limoges. (Note: In 1920 Fauré and Alexandre Marty invented the flamed - frosted relief enamel technique in their atélier. They took part in the International Exhibition of Modern Decorative and Industrial Arts in 1925 in Paris. The two parted around that time and Fauré hired five enamellists in 1925 who were given freedom of creation under the brand "C. Fauré Limoges". Amongst the enamellists was Pierre Bardy who became Dadat's husband. Others were Louis Valade, Marcelle Decouty-Védrenne and Jeanne Soubourou (1879-1968).)

== Sources ==
- Michel C. Kiener: "Les emaux art deco de l'atélier Fauré", Editions Culture et Patrimoine en Limousin, 2016.
- Michel C. Kiener: "Limoges en Art déco, Les vases de cuivre émaillé de l’atelier Fauré", pp. 146 - 155.
- Alberto Shayo: "Camille Fauré: Limoges Art Deco Enamels: the Geometry of Joy", Antique Collectors' Club, 2007, pp. 28 & 29.
