= Magdeleine Boucherit Le Faure =

French pianist and composer (1879–1960)

Madeleine Boucherit Le Faure
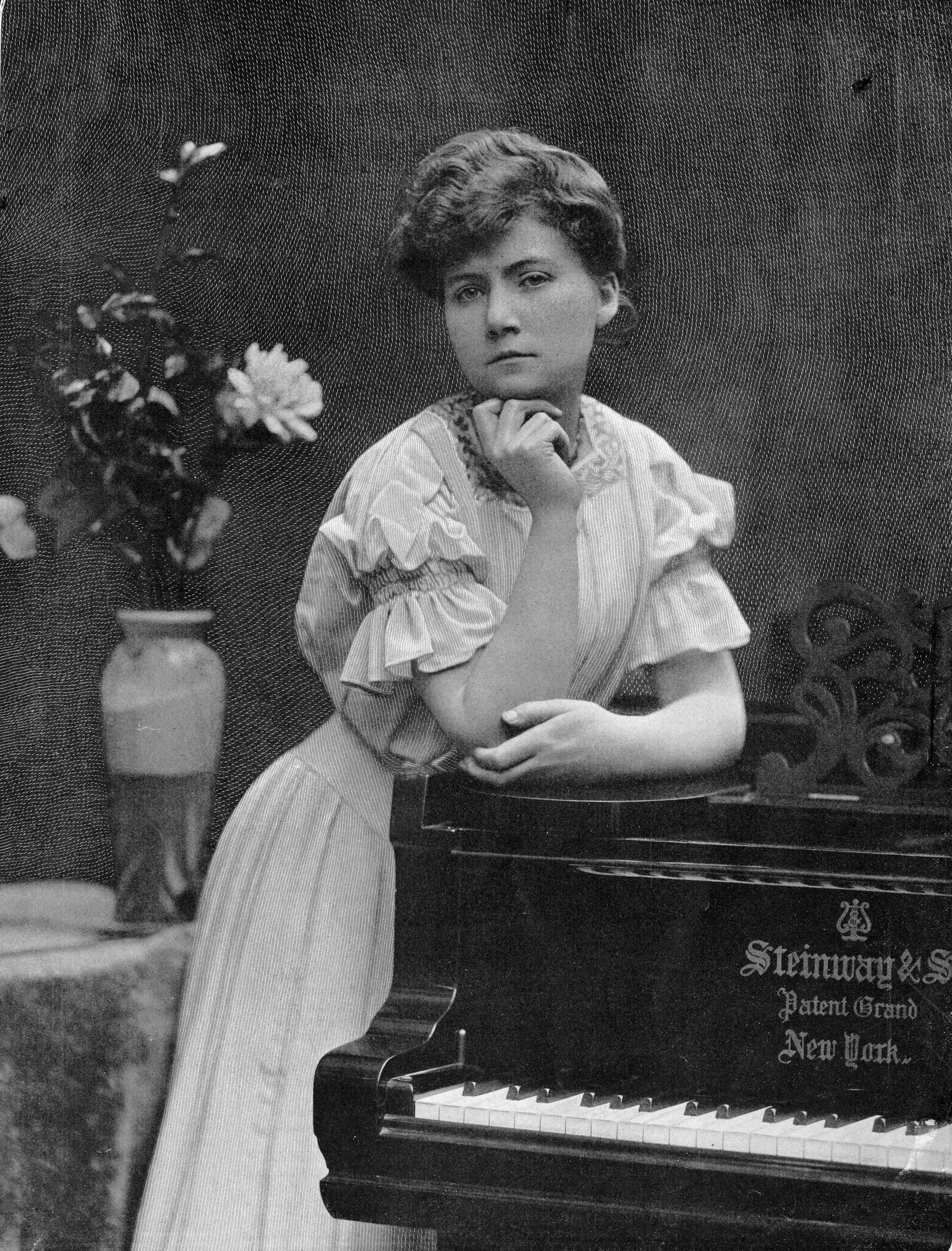
- Born: Madeleine Thérèse Marie Boucherit; 13 May 1879; Morlaix, France
- Died: 14 October 1960 (aged 81); Clichy-la-Garenne, France
- Occupations: Composer of classical music, pianist
- Spouse: Georges Le Faure (m. 1906; died 1953)
- Relatives: Jules Boucherit (brother)

Madeleine Thérèse Marie Boucherit Le Faure (née Boucherit; 13 May 1879 – 14 October 1960) was a French pianist and composer. A teacher at the Conservatoire de Paris, she authored several pieces for piano, specifically for children, gave conducting lessons to young students, and directed the chamber orchestra the petits concerts Mozart that she established.

Her brother, violinist Jules Boucherit, was two years younger than Madeleine and they often concertized together.

== Biography ==
Madeleine Boucherit was born in Morlaix.

She married writer Georges Le Faure on 2 January 1906.

== Works ==
- Legende for Violin and Viola, copyright 1933
- Impressions. Suite for Violin, Viola and Cello. Paris: Éditions Salabert, 1933.
- La journée de Suzy, Histoire d’une poupée, ten easy pieces for piano, specially written for children by Magdeleine Boucherit Le Faure, illustrated by R. de la Nézière. Text by G. Le Faure.
- Les Enfants. Divertissement chorégraphique tiré des Caractères. Text by G. Le Faure. Illustrations by Ch. Gir. Score sheet for piano, 1932.
- La journée de Goudou "L'ours" for violin & piano, Paris : J. Tallandier, 1954
