= Dismal Island =

Island in Graham Land, Antarctica

- Location within Antarctica

Geography
- Location: Antarctica
- Coordinates: 68°6′S 68°50′W
- Highest elevation: 60 m (200 ft)

Administration
- Administered under the Antarctic Treaty System

Demographics
- Population: Uninhabited

Dismal Island is an island, 1.9 kilometres (1 nmi) long and 60 metres (200 ft) high, which is mainly ice covered and is the largest of the Faure Islands, lying in Marguerite Bay off the west coast of Graham Land. The Faure Islands were discovered and first charted in 1909 by the French Antarctic Expedition under Jean-Baptiste Charcot. The group was visited and surveyed in 1949 by the Falkland Islands Dependencies Survey, who so named this island for its appearance of extreme desolation and lifelessness.

== See also ==
- List of Antarctic and sub-Antarctic islands
