= Jules Boucherit =

French violinist and violin pedagogue

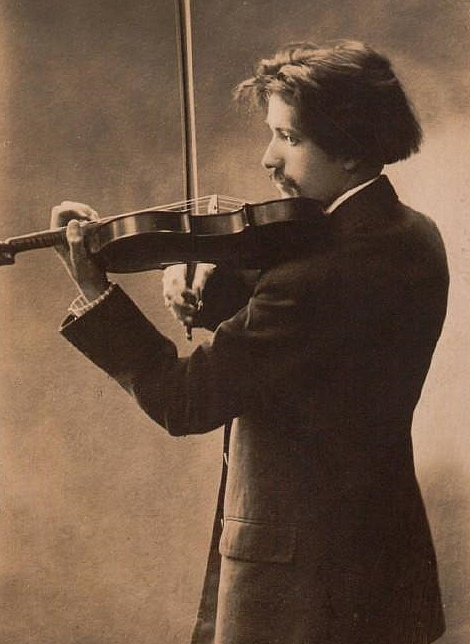
Jules Boucherit

Jules Boucherit (29 March 1877 – 1 April 1962) was a French violinist and renowned violin pedagogue.

Jules Boucherit was born in Morlaix. He attended the Conservatoire de Paris, studying under Jules Garcin. Later he taught at the same conservatoire; notable students include Serge Blanc, Janine Andrade, Ginette Neveu, Manuel Rosenthal, Henri Temianka, Manuel Quiroga, Ivry Gitlis, Michel Schwalbé, Devy Erlih, Michèle Auclair and Marcel Chailley, who became Boucherit's assistant.

He played with pianist Louis Diémer, with his sister, pianist and composer Magdeleine Boucherit Le Faure, and later with Magda Tagliaferro between 1910 and 1922. He made several 78 rpm recordings.

During the war, Jules Boucherit, professor at the Conservatoire, hid and protected Denise Soriano (later to become his wife), Serge Blanc and Devy Erlih, along with other young Jewish musicians. He was awarded the Righteous Among the Nations Medal posthumously (1993).

J. Boucherit died in 1962 in Paris.

- Les Secrets du Violon: Souvenirs de Jules Boucherit (1877–1962) by Jules Boucherit ISBN 2-86742-045-8 / 9782867420450 Publisher Editions des Cendres
