= Fanzor =

Type of DNA cutting enzyme that uses RNA to target genes of interest

The Fanzor (Fz) protein is a eukaryotic, RNA-guided DNA endonuclease, which means it is a type of DNA cutting enzyme that uses RNA to target genes of interest. In bacteria, RNA-guided DNA endonuclease systems, such as the CRISPR/Cas system, serve as an immune system to prevent infection by cutting viral genetic material. Currently, CRISPR/Cas9-mediated's DNA cleavage has extensive application in biological research, and wide-reaching medical potential in human gene editing.

Fanzor belongs to the OMEGA system. Evolutionarily, it shares a common ancestor, OMEGA TnpB, with the CRISPR/Cas12 system. Due to the shared ancestry between the OMEGA system and the CRISPR system, the protein structure and DNA cleavage function of Fanzor and Cas12 remain largely conserved. Combined with the widespread presence of Fanzor across the diverse genomes of different eukaryotic species, this raises the possibility of OMEGA Fanzor being an alternative to CRISPR/Cas system with better efficiency and compatibility in other complex eukaryotic organisms, such as mammals.

== Fanzor as a potential human genome editor ==
Due to its eukaryotic origin, the OMEGA Fanzor system may have some advantages over the better studied CRISPR/Cas gene editor in terms of human genome editing applications. In a CRISPR/Cas9 system, Cas9 proteins are guided by the guide RNA (gRNA) and protospacer adjacent motif (PAM) for DNA cleavage. Interestingly, Fanzor genes in the soil fungus S. punctatus also contain non-coding sequences called ωRNA. Similar to CRISPR/Cas9, Fanzor protein is shown to cleave DNA in test tubes under the guidance of ωRNA and target-adjacent motif (TAM).

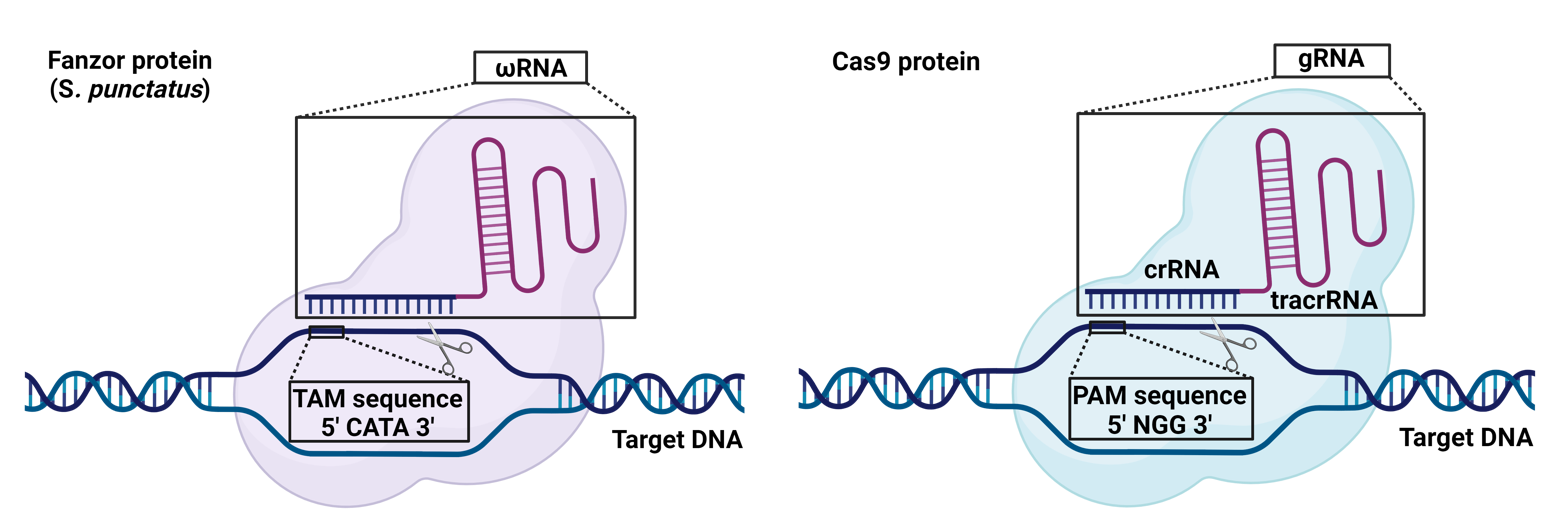
As shown in the schematic, Cas9 DNA cleavage is instructed by the gRNA and the PAM sequence "NGG" on the target DNA, where N can be any of the four DNA components (A, G, C or T). Similarly, Fanzor DNA cleavage is instructed by the ωRNA and the TAM sequence "CATA" on the target DNA1. Not an accurate representation of size and structure of the RNAs and proteins.

In human cells, the Fanzor protein of Spizellomyces punctatus was successfully tested and shown to cleave DNA effectively. However, its efficiency is lower compared to the closely related CRISPR/Cas12a system. By modifying and tweaking the ωRNA and the amino acid sequence, a second version of the S. punctatus Fanzor protein with improved cleavage efficiency - comparable to that of the CRISPR/Cas12a system - was engineered. This shows that, with better modifications and more research, OMEGA Fanzor has the potential to match the CRISPR system in human genome editing in the future.

== Clinical and biotechnological significance ==
Studies conclude that Fanzor has great potential for efficient human genome editing with a higher chance of not getting attacked by the immune system. For example, Fanzor could be used in personalized cancer treatments where the patient's own T-cells - important cells of the immune system that recognize and fight foreign pathogens - are edited in order to recognize and destroy cancer cells. In the field of regenerative medicine, it offers hope for an application in stem cell therapy to treat many disease of genetic origin like type 1 diabetes or neurodegenerative diseases.

Furthermore, Fanzor could potentially be used for genome editing in eggs and sperm for disease prevention and infertility treatment. However, the intervention in such cells' DNA comes with risks and requires strict ethical guidelines.

One major advantage of Fanzor in comparison to the CRISPR/Cas9 system is its small size. Therefore, it can be delivered with viral vectors, which are modified dead bodies of viruses engineered to safely deliver genetic material, such as adenoviruses. Adenoviruses are commonly used in medical applications like gene deliveries or vaccines that do not elicit immune responses within the human body.

However, researchers caution that further research is necessary to improve the editing efficiency and precision.

Next to the application in human cells, Fanzor is a prospective tool for specific genome editing in plants, because of the aforementioned advantages of the protein being a small size. Thereby, the nutrient content, the resistance to diseases and the affordability of crops could be improved. Moreover, in regard to the current and arising challenges caused by climate change, crops could be adjusted to better endure stress factors such as drought, salinity and increasing temperatures.
