= Faure Islands =

Island group in Palmer Land, Antarctica

Coordinates: 68°6′S 68°52′W

Location of the Faure Islands

The Faure Islands (68° 06' S, 68° 52' W) are an archipelago west of Palmer Land in Antarctica.

== See also ==
- Dismal Island, the largest of the group.
