= Diolkos =

Paved trackway near Corinth in Ancient Greece

Coordinates: 37°56′59.95″N 22°57′40.61″E

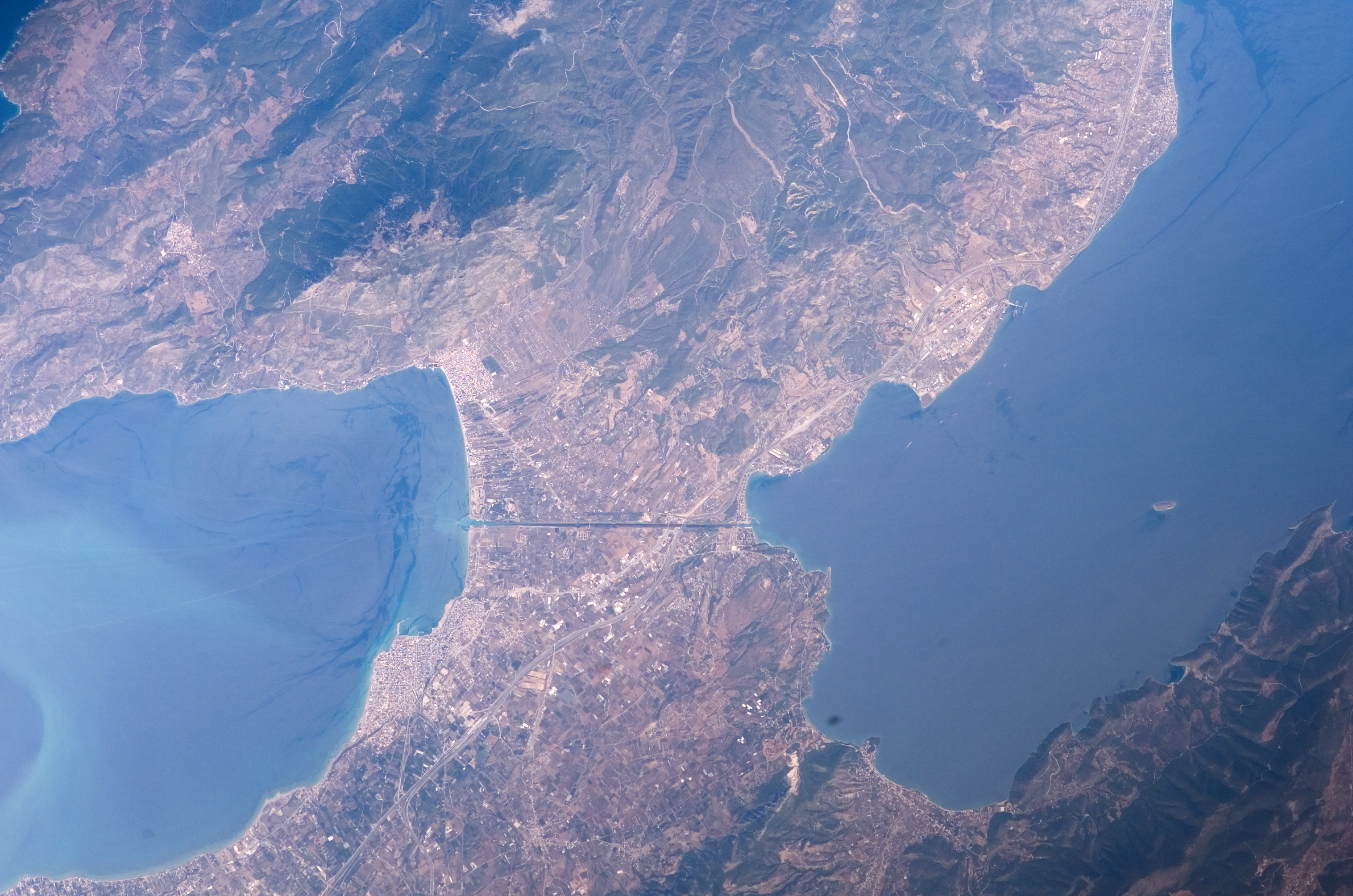
The Isthmus with the Canal of Corinth close to where the diolkos ran.

Strategic position of the Isthmus of Corinth between two seas.

The Diolkos (Δίολκος, from the Greek dia διά, "across", and holkos ὁλκός, "portage machine") was a paved trackway near Corinth in Ancient Greece which enabled boats to be moved overland across the Isthmus of Corinth. The shortcut allowed ancient vessels to avoid the long and dangerous circumnavigation of the Peloponnese peninsula. The phrase "as fast as a Corinthian", penned by the comic playwright Aristophanes, indicates that the trackway was common knowledge and had acquired a reputation for swiftness.

The main function of the Diolkos was the transfer of goods, although in times of war it also became a preferred means of speeding up naval campaigns. The 6-to-8.5-kilometre-long (3 3/4 to 5 1/4 mi) roadway was a rudimentary form of railway, and operated from c. 600 BC until the middle of the first century AD. The Diolkos combined the two principles of the railway and the overland transport of ships, on a scale that remained unique in antiquity.

== Function ==
The Diolkos saved ships sailing from the Ionian Sea to the Aegean Sea, a dangerous sea journey round the Peloponnese, whose three headlands had a reputation for gales, especially Cape Matapan and Cape Malea. By contrast, both the Gulf of Corinth and the Saronic Gulf were relatively sheltered waters. In addition, the overland passage of the Isthmus, a neck of land 6.4 km (4.0 mi) wide at its narrowest, offered a much shorter route to Athens for ships sailing to and from the Ionian coast of Greece.

The Diolkos also had a commercial function in transporting goods. Little is known of its success in increasing trade, but, because of the length of time it was maintained, it is presumed that it had some positive impact. In addition to trade, during wartime the Diolkos may have been used to transport lighter ships across land.

== History ==
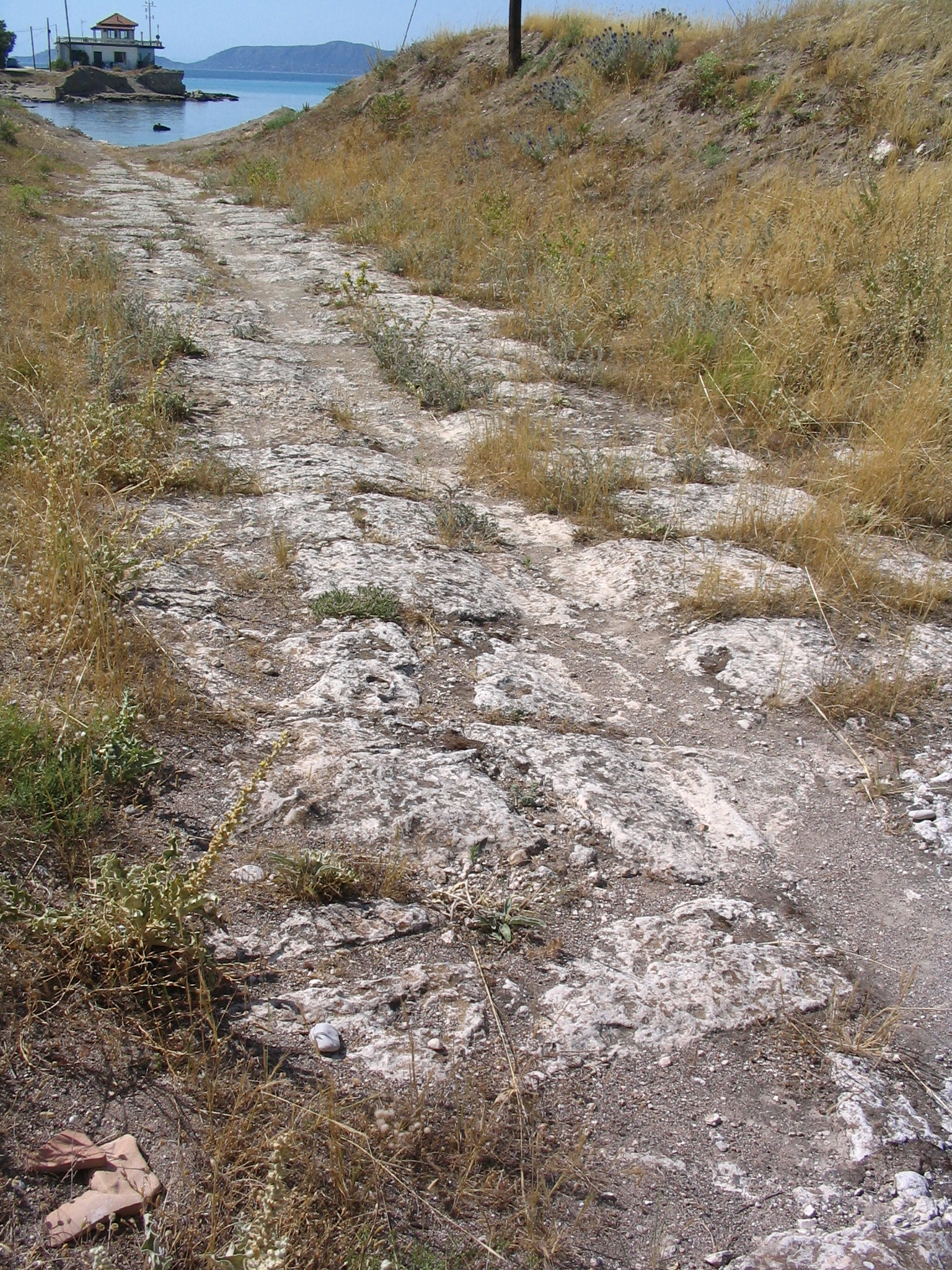
Excavated western end close to the Gulf of Corinth

Ancient literature is silent on the date of the construction of the Diolkos. For Thucydides (460–395 BC) the Diolkos already seemed to be something ancient. Excavated letters and associated pottery found at the site indicate a construction date at the end of the 7th or beginning of the 6th century BC, that is around the time when Periander was tyrant of Corinth.

The Diolkos remained reportedly in regular service until at least the middle of the 1st century AD, after which no more written references appear. Possibly the trackway was put out of use by Nero's abortive canal works in 67 AD. Much later transports of warships across the Isthmus in the late 9th century, and around 1150, are assumed to have used a route other than the Diolkos, due to the extensive time lag.

=== Role in warfare ===
The Diolkos played an important role in Ancient Greek naval warfare. Greek historians note several occasions from the 5th to the 1st century BC when warships were hauled and pulled across the Isthmus in order to speed up naval campaigning. In 428 BC, the Spartans planned to transport their warships over the Diolkos to the Saronic Gulf to threaten Athens, while later in the Peloponnesian War, in 411 BC, they carted over a squadron heading quickly for operations at Chios. In 220 BC, Demetrius of Pharos had a fleet of about fifty vessels dragged across the Isthmus to the Bay of Corinth by his men.

Three years later, a Macedonian fleet of 38 vessels was sent across by Philip V, while the larger warships sailed around Cape Malea. After his victory at Actium in 31 BC, Octavian advanced as fast as possible against Marc Antony by ordering part of his 260 Liburnians to be carried over the Isthmus. In 868 AD, the Byzantine admiral Niketas Oryphas had his whole fleet of one hundred dromons dragged across the Isthmus in a quickly executed operation, but this took place most likely on a different route.

=== Role in commerce ===
Despite the frequent mentioning of the Diolkos in connection with military operations, modern scholarship assumes that the prime purpose of the trackway must have been the transport of cargo, considering that warships would not have needed transporting in this manner very often, and ancient historians were always more interested in war than commerce. Comments by Pliny the Elder and Strabo, which described the Diolkos as being in regular service during times of peace, also imply a commercial use of the trackway. Coinciding with the rise of monumental architecture in Greece, the construction of the Diolkos may have initially served particularly for transporting heavy goods like marble, monoliths and timber to points west and east. It is not known what tolls Corinth extracted from the Diolkos on its territory, but the fact that the trackway was used and maintained long after its construction indicates that it remained for merchant ships an attractive alternative to the trip around Cape Malea for much of antiquity.

== Structure ==
=== Course ===
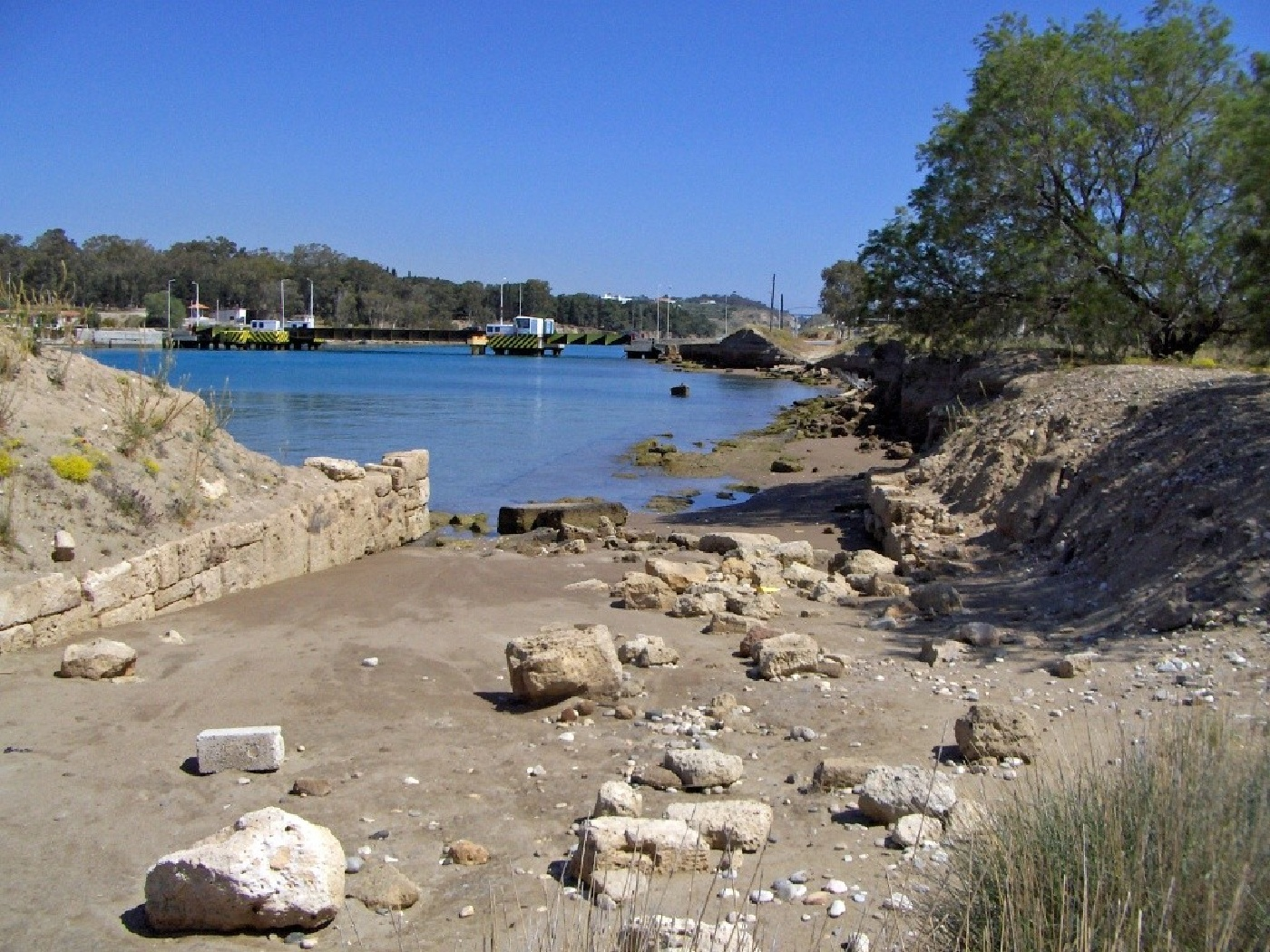
Mooring place

The Diolkos ran across the narrowest part of the Isthmus, where the trackway followed the local topography in a curved course, avoiding steeper gradients. The roadway passed the Isthmus ridge at c. 79 m (259 ft) height with an average gradient of 1:70 (a 1.43% grade), while the steepest sections rose at a gradient of 1:16.5 (a 6% grade). Its total length is estimated at 6–7 km (3.7–4.3 mi), 8 km (5 mi) or 8.5 km (5.3 mi) depending on the number of supposed bends taken into account. A total of 1,100 m (3,609 ft) has been archaeologically traced, mainly at its western end close to the Bay of Corinth. There the known trackway began at a mooring place south of the modern Corinth Canal and ran parallel to its course for a few hundred meters, after which it switched to the north side, running in a slight bend a similar distance along the canal. From there on, the Diolkos either followed in a straight line the course of the modern canal, or swung south in a wide arc. The roadway ended at the Saronic Gulf at the village Schoinos, modern-day Kalamaki, described by Strabo as the trackway's eastern terminal. Sections of the Diolkos were destroyed by the 19th-century Corinth Canal and other modern construction.

=== Track and transport ===
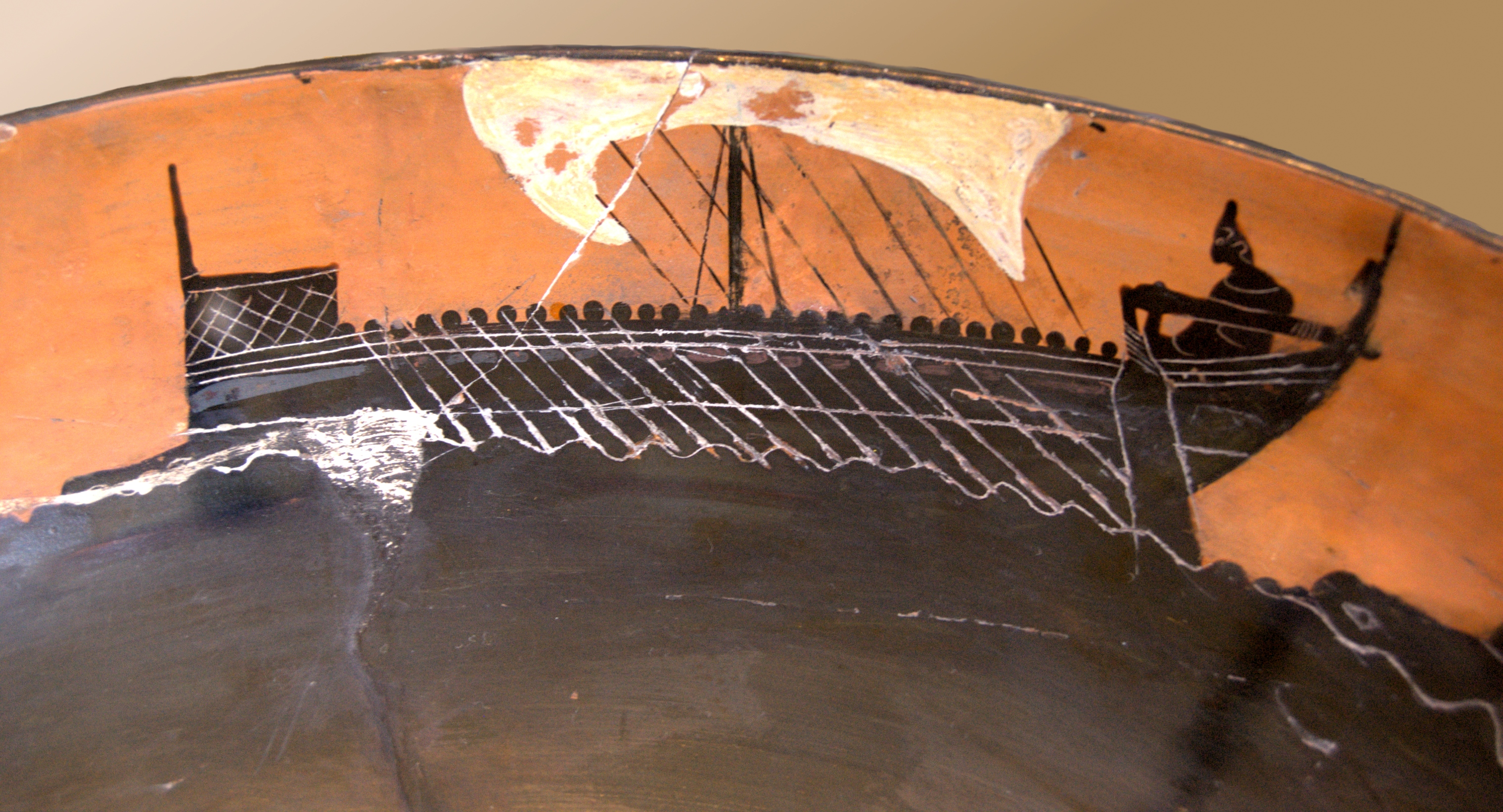
Image of a ship on Attic black-figure pottery (c. 520 BC). This is the sort of boat that the Diolkos may have transported in Periander's time.

The Diolkos was a trackway paved with hard limestone with parallel grooves running about 1.60 metres (63 in) apart. The roadway was 3.4 to 6 metres (11 to 20 ft) wide. Since ancient sources tell little about how the ships were hauled across, the mode of ship transport has largely to be reconstructed from the archaeological evidence. The tracks indicate that transport on the Diolkos was done with some sort of wheeled vehicle. Either vessel and cargo were hauled across on separate vehicles, or only the cargo was taken across and reloaded on a different ship at the other side of the Isthmus.

Although a technical analysis has shown that the transport of triremes (25 t, 35 metres (115 ft) long, 5 metres (16 ft) beam), albeit difficult, was technically feasible, it is assumed that the vessels were usually smaller boats rather than ships. To avoid damaging the keel during transport, hypozomata, thick ropes running from bow to stern, to reduce sagging and hogging of the hull, must have been used. Ship and cargo were presumably pulled by men and animals with ropes, tackles and possibly also capstans.

The scientist Tolley aimed to establish the manpower needed to haul the vessels over the isthmus ridge. Assuming that a trireme soaked with water weighed 38 tons including its trolley, and that a man can exert a force of 300 N over an extended period of time, the pulling teams—depending on the slope and the surface of the cart track—must have numbered between 112 and 142 people, with a combined exertion of force of 33 to 42 kN, or around 3.8 tons weight. Bringing the trolley up to speed may have required as many as 180 men. Assuming a speed of 2 km per hour over an estimated length of 6 kilometres, the transfer from sea to sea would have taken three hours to complete.

Assuming less load and rolling friction, Raepsaet, in contrast, calculates a maximum pulling force of 27 kN, which would have needed a slightly smaller towing crew. Under these circumstances, the use of harnessed oxen—which has been refuted by Tolley on the basis of their relatively diminished pulling capabilities—would have become feasible. However, the necessary expenditure of energy at the Diolkos must be regarded in both scenarios as considerable.

=== Ancient railway ===
According to the British historian of science M. J. T. Lewis, the Diolkos represented a railway, in the basic sense of a prepared track which so guides the vehicles running on it that they cannot leave the track. Measuring between 6 and 8.5 km (3.7 and 5.3 mi), and being open to all on payment, it constituted even a public railway, a concept which according to Lewis did not reoccur until c. 1800. Also, its average gauge of around 160 cm (5 ft 3 in) is similar to modern standards.

However, a close examination of the excavated tracks may give a different picture. While there is agreement that the grooves in the eastern part were cut deliberately into the stone slabs to guide cart wheels, those in the western section are interpreted by some authors as a result of wear or do not appear at all. On the other hand, the marked cambers of this road section may point at deliberate tracks as well. Generally, varying forms of the grooves can also be explained by the long period of operation of the Diolkos, during which modifications and repairs must have significantly changed the appearance of the trackway.

=== Modern exploration ===
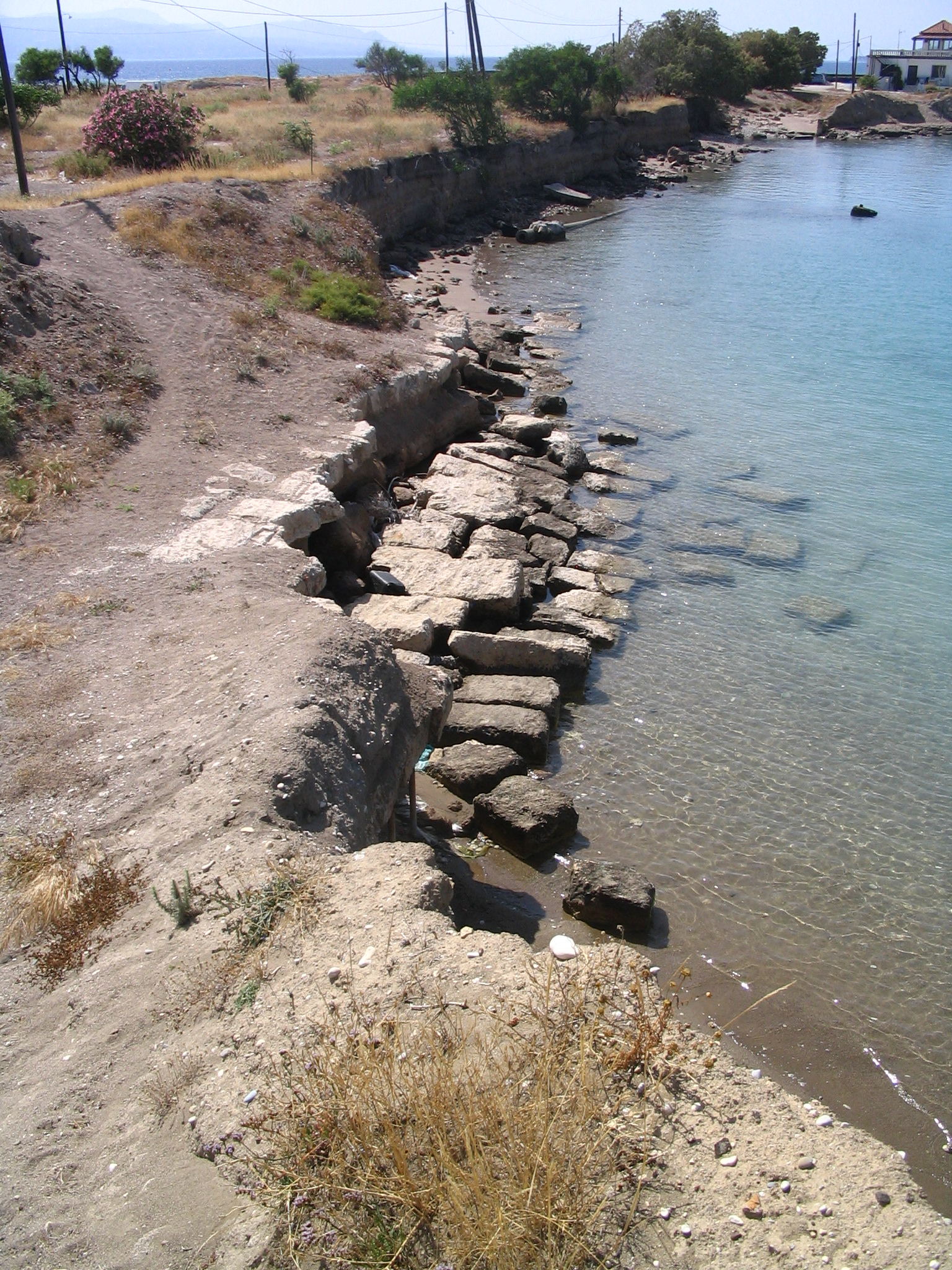
Bank erosion at the western end, before restoration

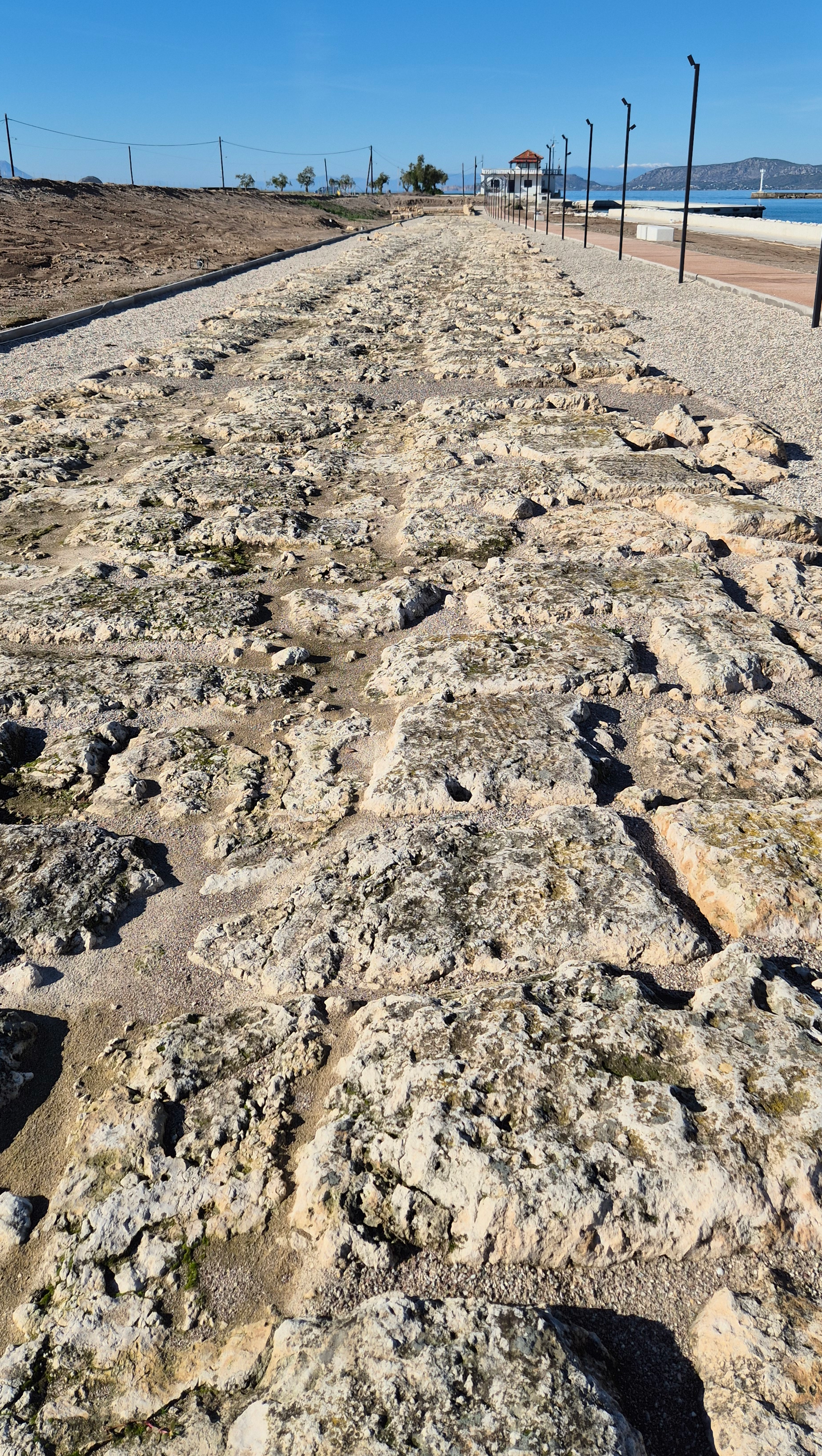
restored part of the Diolkos (December 2025)

The chief engineer of the Corinth Canal, Béla Gerster, conducted extensive research on the topography of the Isthmus, but did not discover the Diolkos. Remains of the ship trackway were probably first identified by the German archaeologist Habbo Gerhard Lolling in the 1883 Baedeker edition. In 1913, James George Frazer reported in his commentary on Pausanias on traces of an ancient trackway across the Isthmus, while parts of the western quay were discovered by Harold North Fowler in 1932.

Systematic excavations were finally undertaken by the Greek archaeologist Nikolaos Verdelis between 1956 and 1962, and these uncovered a nearly continuous stretch of 800 m (2,600 ft) and traced about 1,100 m (3,600 ft) in all. Even though Verdelis' excavation reports continue to provide the basis for modern interpretations, his premature death prevented full publication, leaving many open questions concerning the exact nature of the structure. Additional investigations in situ, meant to complement Verdelis’ work, were later published by Georges Raepsaet and Walter Werner.

Today, erosion caused by ship movements on the nearby Canal has left considerable portions of the Diolkos in a poor state, particularly at its excavated western end. Critics who blame the Greek Ministry of Culture for continued inactivity have launched a petition to save and restore the registered archaeological site. Restoration work was performed in October 2024 to shore up the canal bank where the edge of the Diolkos was eroding into the canal. The Diolkos itself was then surrounded by earth and stone edging, sidewalks with gravel edging to discourage walking directly on the Diolkos (apparently) and streetlights. This surround and walkway is on both sides of the road at the western end of the canal, east of the lowering-bridge. The nearby road and curb are built up to prevent vehicle traffic on the surface.

== Ancient sources ==
The following ancient writers mention the transfer of ships across the Isthmus (in chronological order):

- Thucydides 3.15.1, 8.7, 8.8.3–4
- Aristophanes, Thesmophoriazusae 647–648
- Polybius 4.19.7–9 [318], 5.101.4 [484], frag. 162 (ed. M. Buettner-Wolst)
- Livy 42.16.6
- Strabo 8.2.1 [C.335], 8.6.22 [C.380], 8.6.4 [C.369]
- Pliny the Elder, Natural History, 4.9–11, 18.18
- Cassius Dio 51.5
- Hesychius (ed. Schmidt, I, p. 516.80)
- Suidas 2.92
- George Sphrantzes 1.33
- al-Idrisi (Joubert, P. A.: Géographie d'Édrisi 2, Paris 1840, p. 123)

== Other ship trackways ==
Apart from the Diolkos at Corinth, there is scant literary evidence for two more ship trackways by that name in antiquity, both in Roman Egypt: The physician Oribasius (c. 320–400 AD) records two passages from his 1st century AD colleague Xenocrates, in which the latter casually refers to a diolkos close to the harbor of Alexandria which may have been located at the southern tip of the island of Pharos. Another diolkos is mentioned by Ptolemy (90–168 AD) in his book on geography (IV, 5, 10) as connecting a false mouth of a partly silted up Nile branch with the Mediterranean Sea. Neither Xenocrates nor Ptolemy offers any details on his trackway.

== See also ==
- Ancient Greek technology
- Architecture of ancient Greece
- Corinth Canal
- History of rail transport
- Timeline of railway history
- Towpath
