= István Türr =

Freedom fighter, engineer

István Türr Türr Istvan, Stefano Türr, Étienne Türr
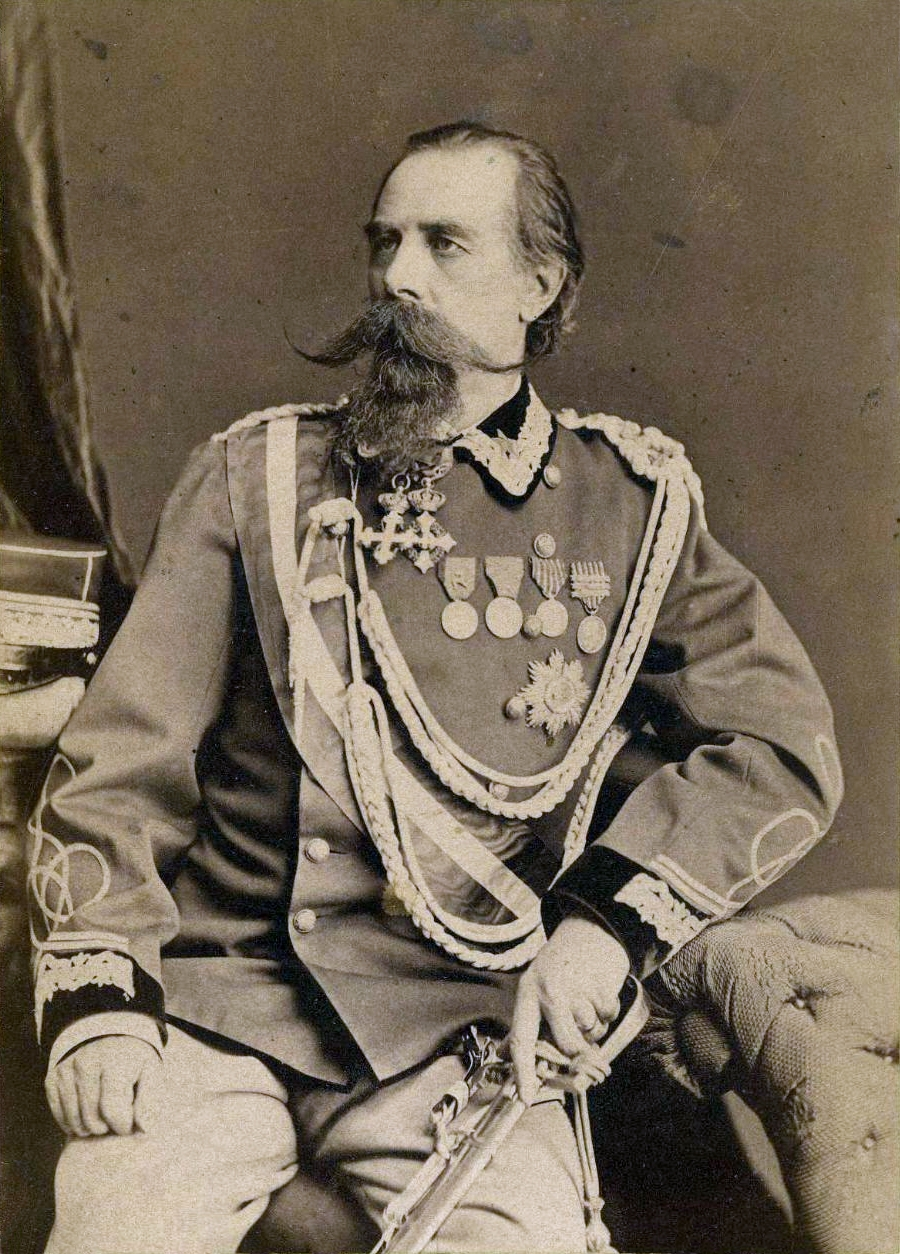
- Portrait by József Borsos, 1870s
- Born: 10 August 1825; Baja, Hungary
- Died: 3 May 1908 (aged 82); Budapest
- Military career
- Allegiance: Austrian Empire (deserted) Hungarian Revolutionary Army 1849 Hungarian Legion (Kingdom of Piedmont-Sardinia); 1849 Baden Revolutionary Army; British Army (Crimean War); Expedition of the Thousand (Garibaldi) Royal Italian Army
- Rank: Lieutenant in the Hungarian Revolutionary Army, Colonel in the 1849 Baden Revolutionary Army, General in the Royal Italian Army
- Other work: Canal architect Engineer; Peace Activist

István Türr (Italian: Stefano Türr, French: Étienne Türr; 10 August 1825 – 3 May 1908) was a Hungarian soldier, revolutionary, canal architect and engineer, remembered in Italy for his role in that country's unification and his association with Garibaldi. In the later years of his life became known as a peace activist.

== Young age and Enlistment ==
Türr was born in the city of Baja, Hungary, the fifth child of an ironmonger. His mother was Terézia Udvary, whose father was a medical doctor. When young he was not a diligent pupil and left school early. As a teenager he tried his father's profession as well as working in a mill and as an unskilled mason, but did not show great aptitude for any of these three jobs.

The first time he tried to enlist in the Austrian Army he was rejected, but on his re-application in 1842 he was accepted at the age of 17. Moreover, officers found in him a hitherto unnoticed promise and encouraged him to improve himself and undergo officer's training at Pécs. By 1848 he was already a military engineer at the rank of lieutenant in a Hungarian grenadier regiment.

== Deserting the Austrian Army, fighting for the 1848 Revolution in Italy ==
At the time when the Hungarian Revolution of 1848 engulfed his homeland, Türr was stationed in Lombardy, Italy. He was involved in early fighting against Piedmont and witnessed the cruel reprisals inflicted on rebellious Italians at Monza, where he was stationed, which caused him to change his loyalties.

On 19 January 1849 Türr crossed the bridge over the Ticino and went over to the Piedmont side. He was immediately placed in command of the newly formed "Hungarian Legion", comprising numerous deserters of the Austrian Imperial Army. Its ranks were swelled by the increasing desertion of Hungarian soldiers and officers, crossing the Ticino in small boats every night until the Austrian command moved them away.

In a parallel development, another Hungarian Legion, headed by Lajos Winkler (1810–1861) who would later become Türr's close associate, was formed at Venice and fought in defence of the revolutionary Repubblica di San Marco headed by Daniele Manin.

Thus, Türr became involved in the First Italian War of Independence, under the leadership of King Carlo Alberto of Piedmont. The final Austrian victory at Novara dashed the Italian hopes. Carlo Alberto had to abdicate and go into exile, and Piedmont could no longer carry on the struggle.

== From Italy to Baden ==
Under the terms of the ceasefire imposed on Piedmont, the Hungarian Legion (and a similar Polish Legion, also composed of deserters from the Austrian Army) were to be disbanded. Privates and NCO's up to the rank of sergeant-major were offered a pardon and a return home. This did not include the officers, but the Austrians did not object to their accepting commissions in the Piedmontese Army.

However, when Türr put it to his men, they voted by acclamation to reject the Austrian pardon, stay together and leave Piedmont in search of a place whose revolution was still holding out. At first they set out for the Roman Republic, but were blocked by the French forces besieging the city (thus, Türr's meeting with Garibaldi, at this time directing Rome's defence, was delayed for ten years).

Next, the Hungarians entered France itself via Nice, where they had to give up their arms and the authorities regarded them with considerable suspicion. The Hungarians, kept for a considerable time in Toulon, conceived the idea of going to the Ottoman Empire, where some Hungarians already got refuge (and many more would follow in the coming years). However, the French disliked this idea, attempting to send them instead to Algiers, where, Türr feared, the Hungarian Legion would "melt down". He then decided to try heading to Britain in the hope that from there it would be easier to get to Turkey.

Hearing of the revolutionary ferment at Baden, Germany, where "the army had joined with the people to overthrow the monarchial government", Türr decided to set out in that direction, also in the hope of eventually returning to a liberated Hungary via Germany. Two contingents of the Hungarian Legion did manage to cross into Germany and reach Baden; a third was stopped by the French and diverted to Folkestone, where the British put them on a ship headed to Turkey.

Bringing sorely needed reinforcements, Türr was warmly welcomed in Baden, made immediately upon arrival a colonel in its revolutionary army, and got three battalions of German troops under his command in addition to the Hungarians who came with him. He did not hold this position long, however, as the Baden revolution soon succumbed to an overwhelming Prussian attack. Together with the overthrown Baden Government, he and his troops had to seek refuge in Switzerland. The victors, in control of occupied Baden, were summarily executing the officers of the revolutionary army who fell into their hands.

In Bern, Türr got the bitter news of the revolution being crushed in his own homeland, too, after prolonged fighting throughout Hungary. He was faced with the prospect of an exile life of indefinite duration, with his life forfeit if he ever tried to go home.

== Sending exiles to America ==
In the wake of the Hungarian Army's surrender at Világos (now Şiria, Romania) on 13 August 1849, the Austrians in the following month, September, renewed the offer of a free pardon to the men of the Hungarian Legion. This time, a considerable part of them accepted the offer, "tired of incessant fatigues and disappointments, and having lost all hope of ever being able to fight for their country's cause", and went back to defeated Hungary.

The sympathetic Government of Switzerland, described by Türr as "always humane and noble minded", financed and facilitated the sending the rest of the Hungarian soldiers to America. (This Federal Swiss government was newly installed, composed of the Radicals, who won the Swiss civil war two years earlier, one of the few regimes established by the Revolutions of 1848 that remained in power, inclined to help the less fortunate revolutionary refugees.)

Türr himself, dejected and in bad health, remained in Europe, alternating between Switzerland and Piedmont, and living on a pension that the Piedmont-Sardinian Government granted to him.

In October 1850, the above-mentioned Captain Lajos Winkler, who had fought at Venice, came over from Lombardy, in command of a party of about a hundred Hungarian privates that he had kept together under discipline. Türr's 1856 brochure, mentioning this and other events of the 1850s, does not relate where Winkler and his men had been and what they had been doing during the year since the fall of Venice; evidently, they had gotten the help of sympathetic Italians.

With the Hungarian fortunes at their nadir, Türr and Winkler devised a plan of sailing with this troop to Montevideo, to join the Liberal forces fighting against Juan Manuel de Rosas in the Uruguayan Civil War. Since the 1830s, the prolonged struggle, especially the perilous Siege of Montevideo, gained the considerable support and sympathy of progressive Europeans, and it was there that Garibaldi first gained his reputation as a freedom fighter. With the European revolutions crushed, the war in Uruguay seemed to offer Türr the only place where he could still "contribute to the protection of freedom against oppression and tyranny".

Had Türr carried out this plan, his subsequent career might have been considerably different. However, at Genoa, they were faced with a firm Austrian demand for the extradition of the Hungarian deserters. To save them, Türr falsely declared that they had all belonged to the former Piedmontese-Hungarian Legion that he had commanded and thus covered by the amnesty offered to these.

Türr gained the Piedmontese Government's permission to take the Hungarian troops to Switzerland, whose friendly Federal Council in turn obtained French permission for them to go to America. As the Austrians had not completely given up their demands, Türr personally conducted the exiled troops as they made their way on foot to Le Havre and saw them safely embarked to their destination.

From the Austrian point of view, the demand for the Hungarian troops' extradition turned out to be a serious blunder. Instead of letting Türr neatly get rid of himself and devote his energies to Latin American struggles, the Austrians themselves ensured that he would stay on in Europe and become an increasingly disturbing thorn in the Habsburg Empire's side.

Many of the Hungarian "Forty-Eighters" who arrived in the US at this time are known to have later fought on the Union side in the American Civil War. The ones sent off by Türr might have been among them.

== Mazzinian conspiracies and the Crimean War ==
Between 1850 and 1853 the exile Türr, facing execution as a deserter should he return to Hungary, moved between Switzerland, France, England and Piedmont.

In the early 1850s he became closely involved with fellow exile in Mazzinian conspiracies, such as the failed Milan uprising of 6 February 1853.

Following the outbreak of the Crimean War Türr was also involved in the plan of György Klapka, former War Minister of the 1848 revolutionary Hungarian government, to raise a force of Hungarian exiles to fight against Russia, whose intervention in 1848–49 had tipped the scales against the Hungarian rebels.

Even before the Crimean War, a considerable number of exiled Hungarians had already taken service with the Ottomans, some reaching high positions without having to convert to Islam (see Islam in Hungary). During the Siege of Kars in eastern Anatolia, Hungarian exiles took an active part in defending this border city against the invading Russians.

As Türr would later disclose to Italian friends, supporting the Ottoman Empire against the Russian Empire was far less satisfactory to him than taking part in the Italian struggle for liberation. It was more in the nature of "serving one barbarism, out of the hatred of another barbarism".

== Arrest by the Austrians, court martial, release ==
During the Crimean War, in 1855 Türr was required to procure supplies for the British forces in the Danubian Principalities, at the time occupied by Austria though not annexed to the Habsburg Empire. He trusted to the protection of the British and to promises of safe-conduct by locally stationed Austrian officers, which were apparently overruled by Vienna.

In Bucharest Türr was arrested and sent on to Kronstadt (the present Brașov), where he was interrogated and court-martialed. He was sentenced to death for desertion and treason ("seeking to detach Italy and Hungary from Austrian rule"). However, the Emperor commuted his punishment to perpetual banishment, due to the strong British protests, apparently involving Queen Victoria personally.

At the time, the whole affair got considerable press attention all over Europe, and on his release Türr published a long and detailed account of it.

== Disputed British naturalization ==
It was in 1856, after this intervention to save him that Turr asked for British citizenship. This was granted, but his naturalization was thereafter strongly contested, as can be seen from a then-classified British document stating tersely:

Naturalization by certificate of secretary of state: Naturalization Act 1844: Certificate obtained by fraud: Colonel Etienne Turr. False statements as to residence and intention to reside. Law officers advised that certificate could not be revoked by secretary of state.

The document was declassified only thirty years later and not given particular prominence even then. It does not seem to have influenced Turr's reputation.

== 1859 fighting, wounded at Brescia ==
With the outbreak of the Second Italian War of Independence in 1859 Türr returned to that country and joined Garibaldi's volunteer unit Cacciatori delle Alpi ("Hunters of the Alps"). Garibaldi held Türr in great esteem and in one speech dubbed him "The Fearless Hungarian".

On the circumstances of Turr's wounding on 15 June 1859, an eye-witness report is provided in a letter by Frank Leward, an English volunteer fighting with Garibaldi:

Col Türr, an' Hungarian who hates the Austrians like sin, had been sent with a lot more of our men to Rezzato a few miles from Brescia on the road to Preschiera and a battalion of Austrians came at them but Türr sent them off and was so excited he followed them up too far and fell into a sort of ambuscade they had waiting for him and he got awfully cut up. However he managed to keep the enemy at bay for some time. Castenodolo the place was called I think [where] Türr lost a heap of men(...).

The General [Garibaldi] was in an awful stew, [he] made me go with him to Castenodolo. On the way we met Türr badly wounded in an ambulance he was very bad but tried to sit up and sang out viva Italia then we met a lot more wounded being carried off.

== Expedition of the Thousand, promotion to general ==
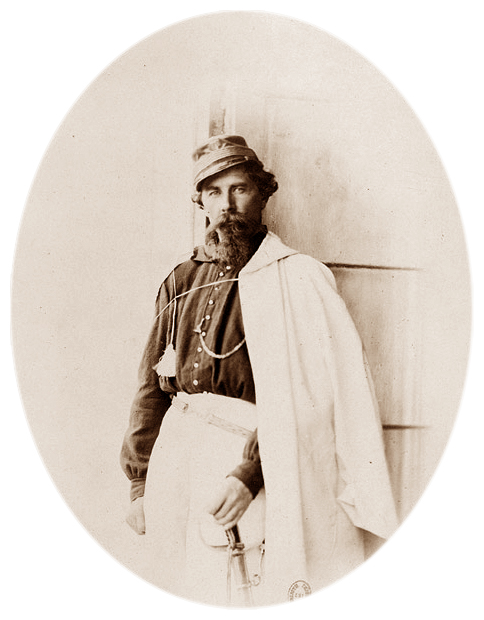
General István Türr in Palermo, during the 1860 Expedition of the Thousand (photo by Gustave Le Gray).

Türr had completely recovered from his wounds by the next year (1860), when he again followed Garibaldi and took a major part in the Expedition of the Thousand.

The 500 Hungarians led by Türr, helped by fellow exiles Adolf Mogyórody, Nándor Éber and Gusztáv Frigyesy, were the largest contingent of foreign volunteers fighting with Garibaldi, alongside French, Poles, Swiss, German and other nationalities. Like the Hungarians, most of the other internationals were fighting with a view to follow up the liberation of Italy with that of their own countries from foreign or domestic tyranny (see International Legion).

In later parts of the campaign, as Garibaldi's campaign gathered momentum and many local recruits in Sicily and South Italy, Türr was in command also of an increasing number of Italian troops.

In Talamone, en route to Sicily, Garibaldi promoted Türr to General and included him in the General Staff formed for the expedition. After the Siege of Palermo, Türr led the force that went through the rugged Sicilian interior towards Messina, while Garibaldi himself went on along the island's north shore. After crossing to the mainland, Türr led a force of 1,500 men towards Salerno.

Franco Catalano, analysing the Battle of Volturnus (1860), accuses Turr of "reckleness" that contributed to the initial Garibaldian defeats at Caiazzo and Castel Morrone, but the overall battle ended with Garibaldi's decisive victory, and at the time there were no recriminations.

In the aftermath of the fighting Türr was appointed by Garibaldi as Governor of Naples. In this role he conducted the plebiscite of 21 October 1860, in which the city's population voted overwhelmingly in favour of incorporation in the new Kingdom of Italy.

During the famous meeting of Garibaldi with King Victor Emmanuel II at Teano, the king refused Garibaldi's request that the soldiers and officers who took part in the Expedition of the Thousand be taken into the Italian Army, and most of them were in fact dismissed. Garibaldi afterwards went back to his home in Caprera, and his later relations with the King and the royal government were often tense. However, Victor Emmanuel not only confirmed Türr's rank as a general but also made him a royal aide-de-camp, and subsequently entrusted to Türr the handling of some sensitive diplomatic matters. Despite this divergence of political courses, Türr remained on highly cordial and friendly relations with Garibaldi until the latter's death in 1882.

Meanwhile, back in Austrian-ruled Hungary, the city of Debrecen on 6 February 1861, declared Türr and as Kossuth, Klapka and other exiled nationalists, to be its honorary citizen. This was an act of defiance, as at the time Türr stood to be executed out of hand had he attempted to arrive at the city whose honorary citizen he became,

== Wedding and Napoleonic connection ==
On 10 September 1861, in Mantua, Türr married Adelina Bonaparte Wyse (1838–1899). Her mother was Princess Maria Letizia Bonaparte, daughter of Lucien Bonaparte, a brother of the Emperor Napoleon; thus Adelina was also a first cousin once removed of the reigning French Emperor Napoleon III. Although Adelina's legal father was Sir Thomas Wyse, British Minister to Athens, in reality Princess Letizia had separated from her husband. Adelina's biological father was her mother's long-time lover British Army officer Captain Studholme John Hodgson. In the same year as Adelina's wedding to Türr, Adelina's elder sister Marie Bonaparte-Wyse (1831–1902) married the Piedmontese statesman Urbano Rattazzi, who was the Italian Prime Minister several times during the 1860s. Adelina also had a younger brother Lucien (1845–1909), who would in the 1870s become a prominent business partner of Türr.

Türr is mentioned as having, with the help of his wife, carried out extensive diplomatic activity. Among other things, both of them are known to have conducted extensive correspondence with Prince Napoleon, the Emperor's cousin and advisor, a proponent of the anti-Clerical forces in the French imperial court and opponent of the policy of letting French troops preserve the Pope's temporal power over Rome

István Türr and his wife had one son, Raoul Türr (1865–1906).

== Pallanza Dignitary ==
In October 1862, Türr acquired from the Milanese Carlo Lattuada a villa in Pallanza, described as "an elegant dwelling with a garden facing the lake" (i.e. Lake Maggiore).

The Türrs immediately became prominent figures in the town's social life, as seen in repeated reports in the local paper, the "Il Lago Maggiore". The return after a visit to France of "The Valorous Hungarian General and his Most Beautiful and Amiable Consort, Princess Bonaparte" was a major local news item. The couple were hosted and feted by the town's dignitaries (sub-prefect, municipal councillors and the commander of the local National Guard) with a civic band playing various pieces, prominently ones associated with Garibaldi.

The Türrs also took considerable interest in the lower classes. Türr became the Honorary President of the local Labourers' Society (Società Operaia di Pallanza) and gave donations to be distributed among the needy. On 4 November 1862 the paper noted with regret that:

Now that the summer is over, the Türr Family has left and are not expected back until next spring. They carry with them the esteem and affection of the townspeople, who have come to appreciate their rare qualities. Before her departure, Mrs. Adelina Türr insisted upon visiting the orphanages, where the children greeted her with a most abundant dose of confetti. It was wonderful to see this scion of one of the greatest and most powerful families of Europe caress and kiss the sons of our labourers, and make the effort of conversing with them in their Pallanzese dialect.

In 1876, the Pallanza villa was sold to Cesar Bozzotti, apparently because Türr was able to return to Hungary after 1867 (see below) and, therefore, spent less time in Italy.

== Romanian Negotiations ==
In 1863, Türr returned to the Romanian Principalities, now under the government of Alexandru Ioan Cuza, who had shown some sympathy to the Hungarian exiles. Following upon an earlier (1861) delegation headed by Klapka, Türr sought an agreement on establishing Hungarian weapons and supplies depots on Moldavian soil, with a view to a new uprising against Habsburg rule.

In case of their independence being achieved, the Hungarians promised "a full autonomy" to the Romanian population of Transylvania. Nevertheless, disagreement on the Question of Transylvania prevented Türr and his fellows from reaching an agreement.

At the time, Türr was a confidential adviser to Italian King Vittorio Emanuele. With Venetia still held by the Austrians and a new war a distinct possibility, it was clearly in Italy's interest to have a Hungarian rebellion open a second front for the Austrians.

== Planned Hungarian uprising in 1866 ==
In 1866, in coordination with the Third Italian War of Independence and Garibaldi's campaign against the Austrians in the Trentino, Türr was assigned to prepare an uprising in Hungary involving György Klapka and other Hungarian exiles. It was supposed to be launched from Serbian territory, but because of the fast ending of the Prussian-Austrian War including its Italian part, it never came to implementation, and the next year's developments rendered all such plans moot.

== Return to Hungary ==
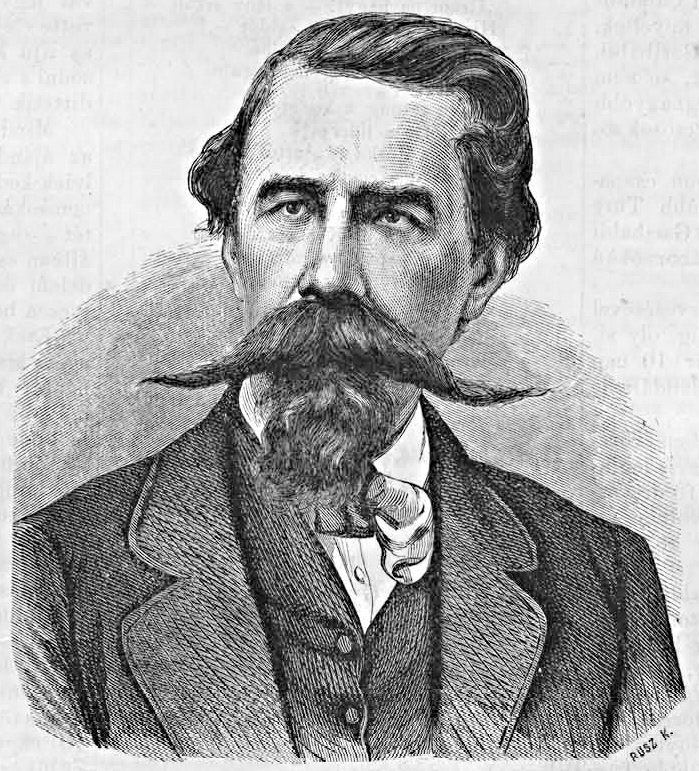
The 42-year-old István Türr at the time of his return to Hungary (drawing by Károly Rusz, 22 September 1867)

Defeat in the war forced the Emperor Franz Josef to grant a Liberal Constitution as well as a renewed autonomy for the ancient Kingdom of Hungary; the unitary Austria became the dual Austria-Hungary. The changed political climate also included an amnesty for exiles such as Türr, who could at last return to his homeland.

Not long after his return, Türr, no longer an implacable foe of Austrian interests, was informally involved in (ultimately unsuccessful) negotiations aimed at creating an alliance between Austria, Italy and France.

== Canal Architect and Engineer ==
Though often referred to as "General Türr" until the end of his life, in practice Türr did not take up an active military or political career in Hungary. Rather, he chose to devote his later years to working as a canal architect and engineer.

Using his wide international experience and personal contacts, he was a leading proponent of the building of navigation canals and river navigation systems in Hungary. On the basis of his international experience, Türr was charged with élaborating a plan for navigable canals connecting the Danube and Tisza rivers.

Türr was deeply involved with the Panama Canal in its earlier stages, being himself the President of the "Societe Civile Internationale du Canal Interoceanique de Darien", a society founded to promote the building of an interoceanic canal across Panama. One of the other directors was his brother-in-law Lucien Bonaparte-Wyse. In 1876, the society sent Bonaparte-Wyse together with the younger Hungarian engineer Béla Gerster to Panama with the task of locating the most suitable route for the canal. In 1879, however, the society sold its financial interest to a company headed by Ferdinand de Lesseps; its directors (including Türr and Bonaparte-Wyse) realised a profit on their investment of more than 3000 percent. Their withdrawal from the project also saved Türr from public responsibility for the fiasco of the collapse of the French Panama project and the appalling loss of thousands of workers to disease at Panama.

After 1881, Türr and Gerster were involved with the Greek Government's major project of planning and implementing the Corinth Canal, a project that gained considerable international attention. In his 1883 travel book, "To the Gold Coast for Gold", Richard Francis Burton mentioned meeting "that talented and energetic soldier, General Türr" in Venice, and predicted that the hitherto impoverished Patras "will have a fine time when [Türr] begins the piercing of the Isthmus." In 1888, the company constructing the canal failed, putting the project's completion in danger. Türr then led a successful effort to get governments and individuals to invest further sums, so that on 6 August 1893, King George I of Greece and his wife, Queen Olga could solemnly inaugurate the artificial waterway.

Also in partnership with Gerster, Türr formulated monumental plans of water-supply engineering in Hungary itself. As well as promoting the canalization of the Danube he was distinguished for supporting the newborn Hungarian national industry.

== 1890s Transylvania Controversy ==
Like other Hungarian Nationalists, Türr in his later years was mainly concerned, not with confronting Austrian rule, a goal mostly if not completely achieved through the compromise of 1867, but in preserving Hungarian territory and interests against the demands of other nationalities.

In particular, Türr was opposed to the Transylvanian Memorandum movement of 1892, whose initiators demanded greater autonomy for Romanians, a demand seen as the prelude for altogether detaching Transylvania from Hungarian rule and therefore causing the Manifesto's organisers to be imprisoned by the Hungarian authorities.

In 1894 and 1895, Türr published articles condemning the Memorandum participants and their Bucharest-based partisans. One of the latter, V. A. Urechia, answered in kind in a series of articles of his own, debating Türr on the pages of the European press and in various international forums.

== "The Pacifist General" of the Universal Peace Congresses ==
In 1878, the International Peace Congress ("Congrès International de la Paix") was held in Paris, bringing together a great a variety of peace activists from all over Europe to debate ways of working to prevent war. One of the organizers, the Swiss Valentine de Sellon who would later write a book on the congress noted with great satisfaction the participation of workers and women, and "even [of] a former general". The former general referred to was István Türr.

From that time until his death, Türr would increasingly become known in the role of "The Pacifist General", who became "a prominent personality of the international peace movement". In the 1890s, Türr was "a regular fixture" in the annual Universal Peace Congresses, held every year at a different location. In 1896 he was elected President of the Seventh Congress, held at Budapest.

The well-known Austrian pacifist Bertha Von Suttner recalls in her memoires the great impression of meeting, on that occasion, "the old warrior, General Türr" (he was seventy one at the time) and hearing from him that "he had seen so much of war that he came to thoroughly detest it".

Türr recalled, and Von Suttner later published, some horrors that he had witnessed during the Expedition of the Thousand, which had not been published in 1860 itself. For example, entering a village and discovering the bodies of Bourbon soldiers who had been burned to death by the inhabitants. When Garibaldi became extremely furious with the villagers for having perpetrated such an act, they responded that it was done in retaliation for the soldiers having earlier set houses on fire in the village and prevented their inhabitants from escaping.

== "Yellow Peril" and The Boxer Rebellion ==
Türr was the first person known to have used in public the term "The Yellow Peril". He used it in June 1895; in an article mainly concerned with Otto von Bismarck, there was a passage referring to Japan's recent victory over China where Türr remarked: "The 'yellow peril' is more threatening than ever. Japan has made in a few years as much progress as other nations have made in centuries." This was widely republished and translated throughout the world.

A few months later, in September 1895, Kaiser Wilhelm II took up the term and made extensive use of it, being indeed often credited as its originator. As interpreted by the German Emperor (and subsequently, by many others) this implied a concrete threat by "Yellow Hordes" in the Far East, poised to invade and overwhelm the West by sheer numbers. This attitude to "Yellow-skinned people" had very concrete results in Wilhelm, a few years later, explicitly exhorting German troops involved in putting down the Boxer Rebellion in China to particularly ruthless and cruel conduct.

There is, however, no record of Türr sharing such attitudes. In fact, "General Etienne Turr, Buda" is duly noted in the list of participants at the Tenth Universal Peace Congress held at Glasgow in 1901, where that Western expedition against the Boxer Rebellion, in the previous year, was strongly condemned. In that gathering, Dr. Spence Watson got applause when stating at the podium that "The swooping down of the Christian nations on China [was] the most detestable bit of greed that history records". The conference as a whole adopted resolutions clearly condemning that Western intervention in China (though in milder terms) and stating that defence of Western missionaries active in non-European countries, or of converts to Christianity, was not an acceptable reason for waging war.

The transcript does not record, however, any speech made by Türr himself, who was then 76 and had recently lost his wife.

== Last years ==
Türr's wife Adelina died on 8 July 1899 at Berck, France. In his last years, Türr spent much of his time in Paris. He died in Budapest on 3 May 1908. His son Raoul predeceased him in 1906.

He was survived by his granddaughter Maria Stephanie Türr (1895–1994). Today, there are only a few descendants of István Türr and the granddaughter of Lucien Bonaparte, Adelina.

== Gallery ==
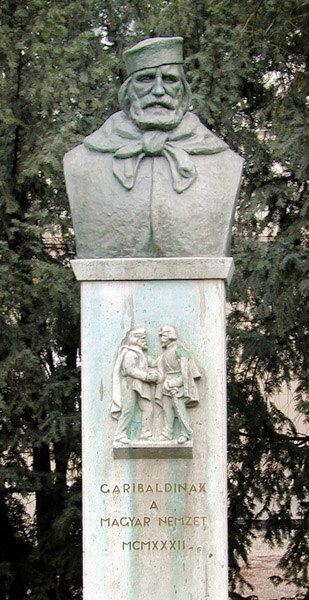
Garibaldi and István Türr shaking hands on the base of Garibaldi's bust

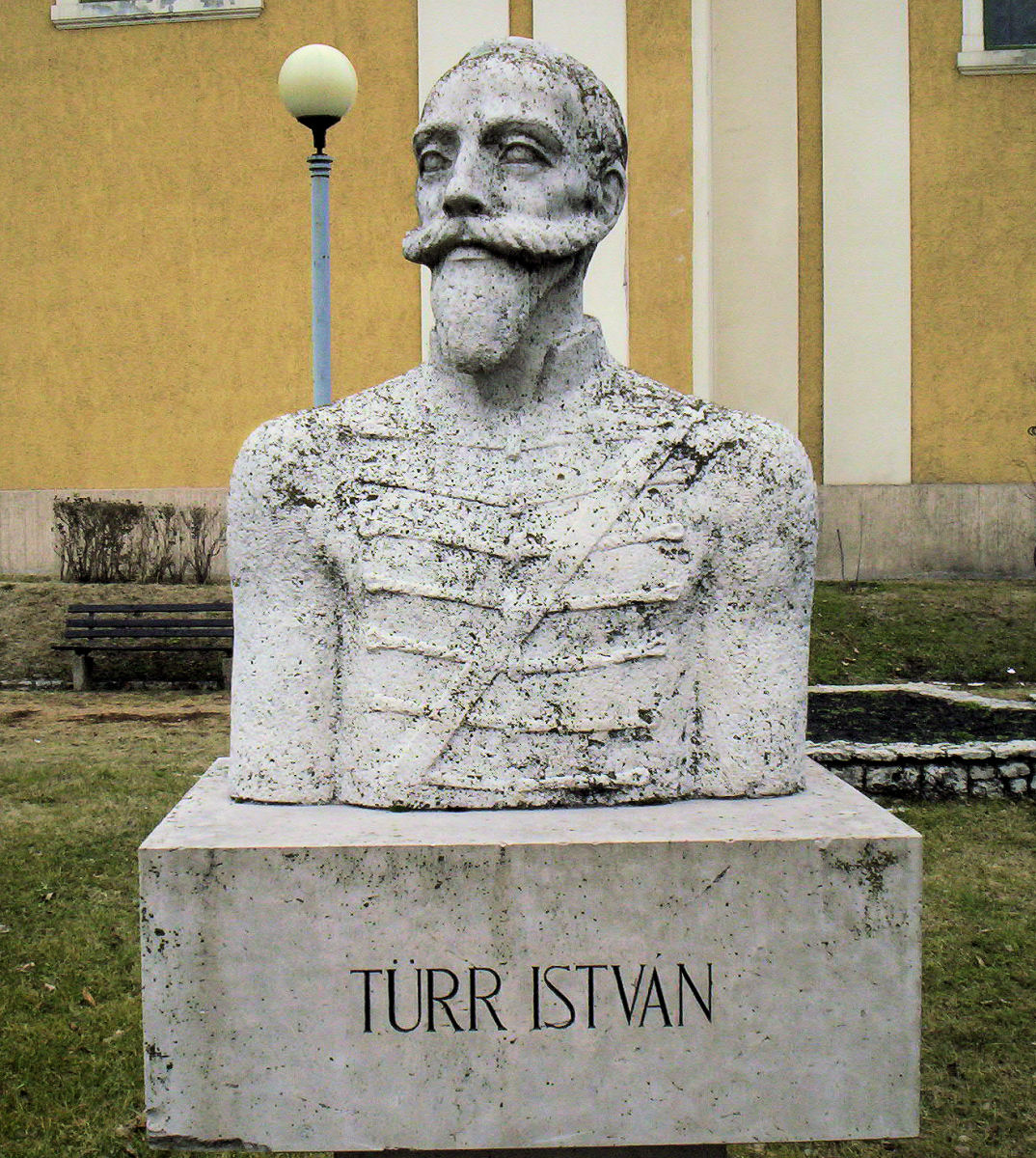
Türr plaque at the Bajá Museum

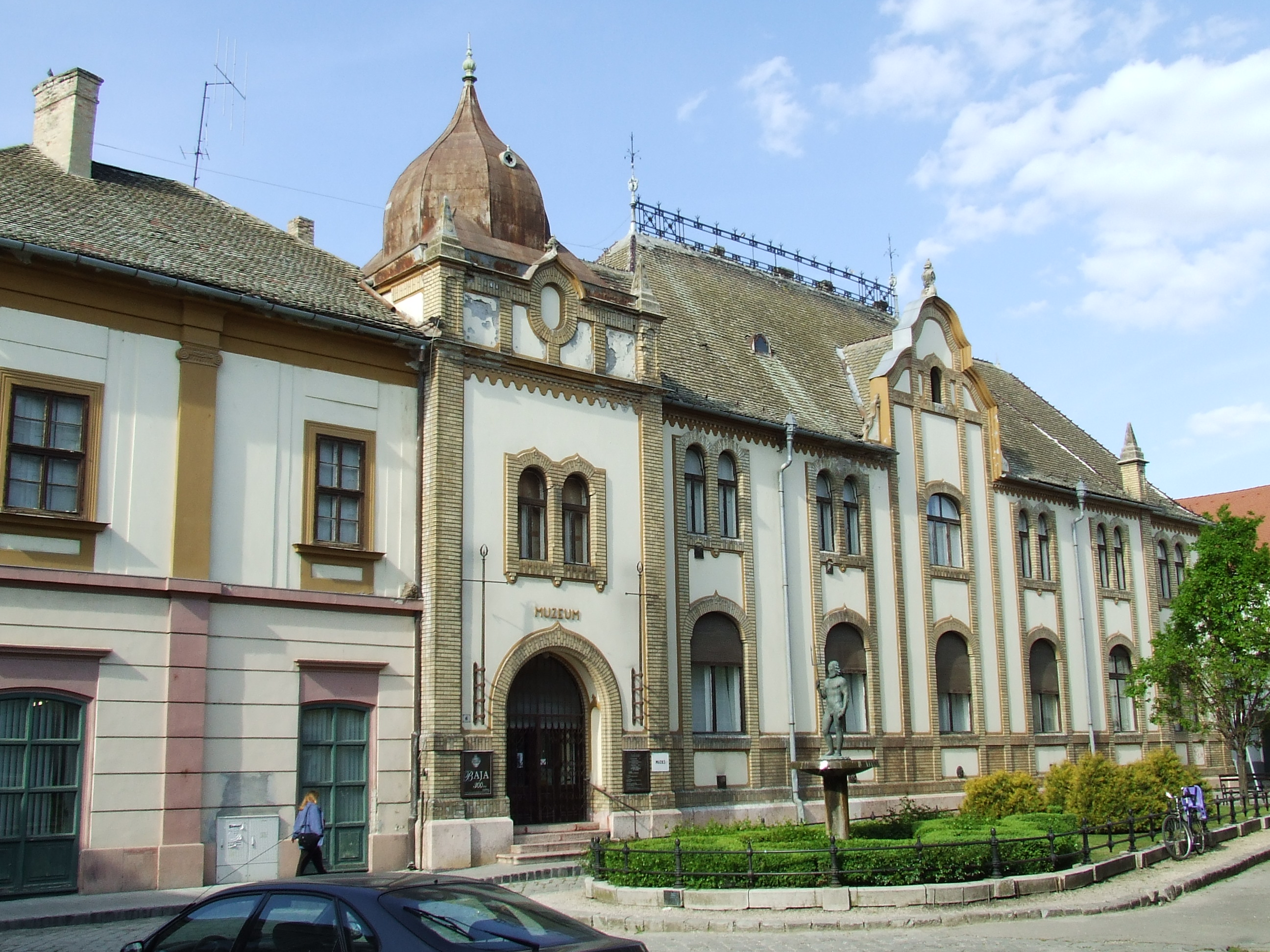
The István Türr Museum in Baja

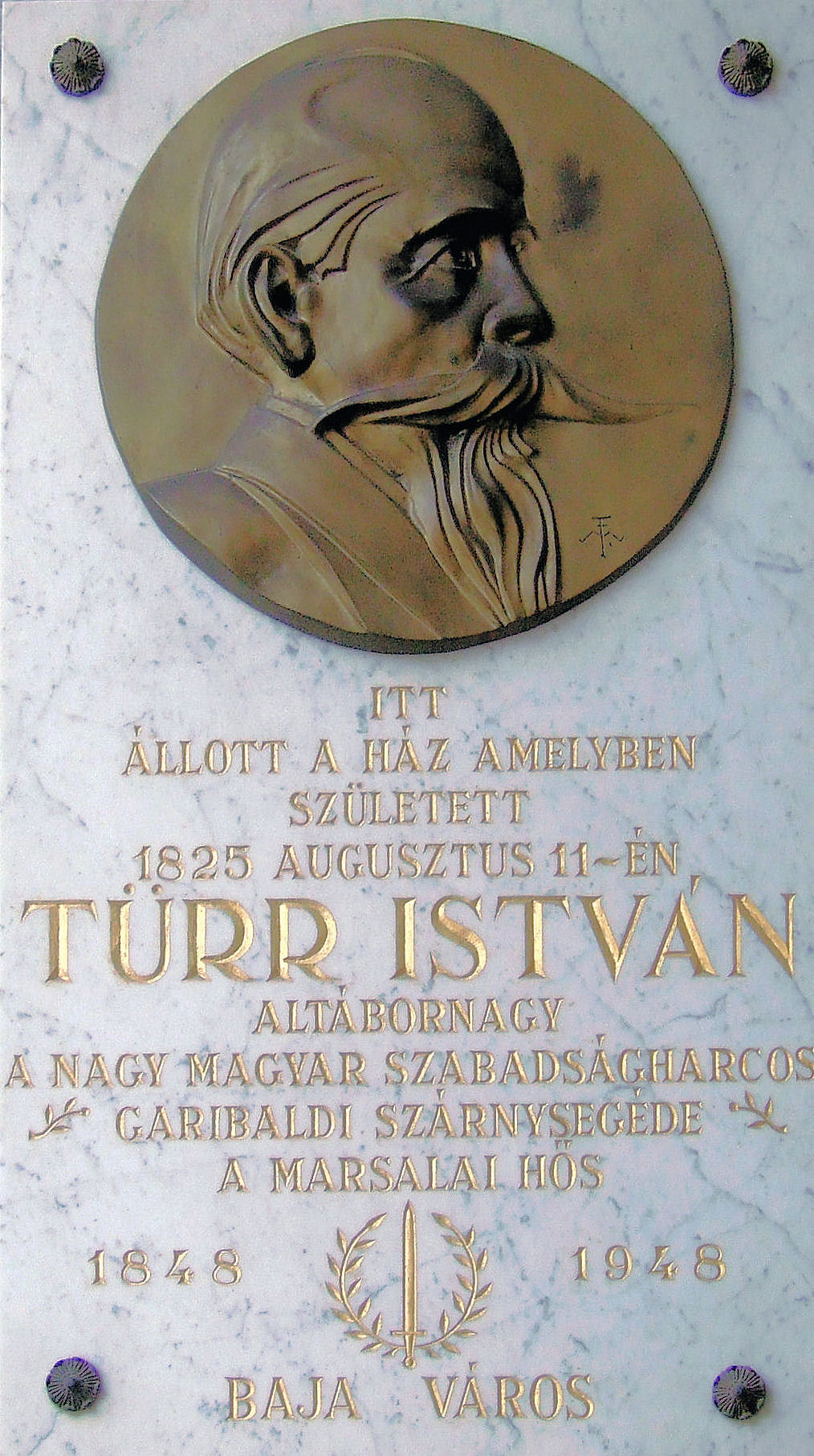
Memorial plaque in Baja

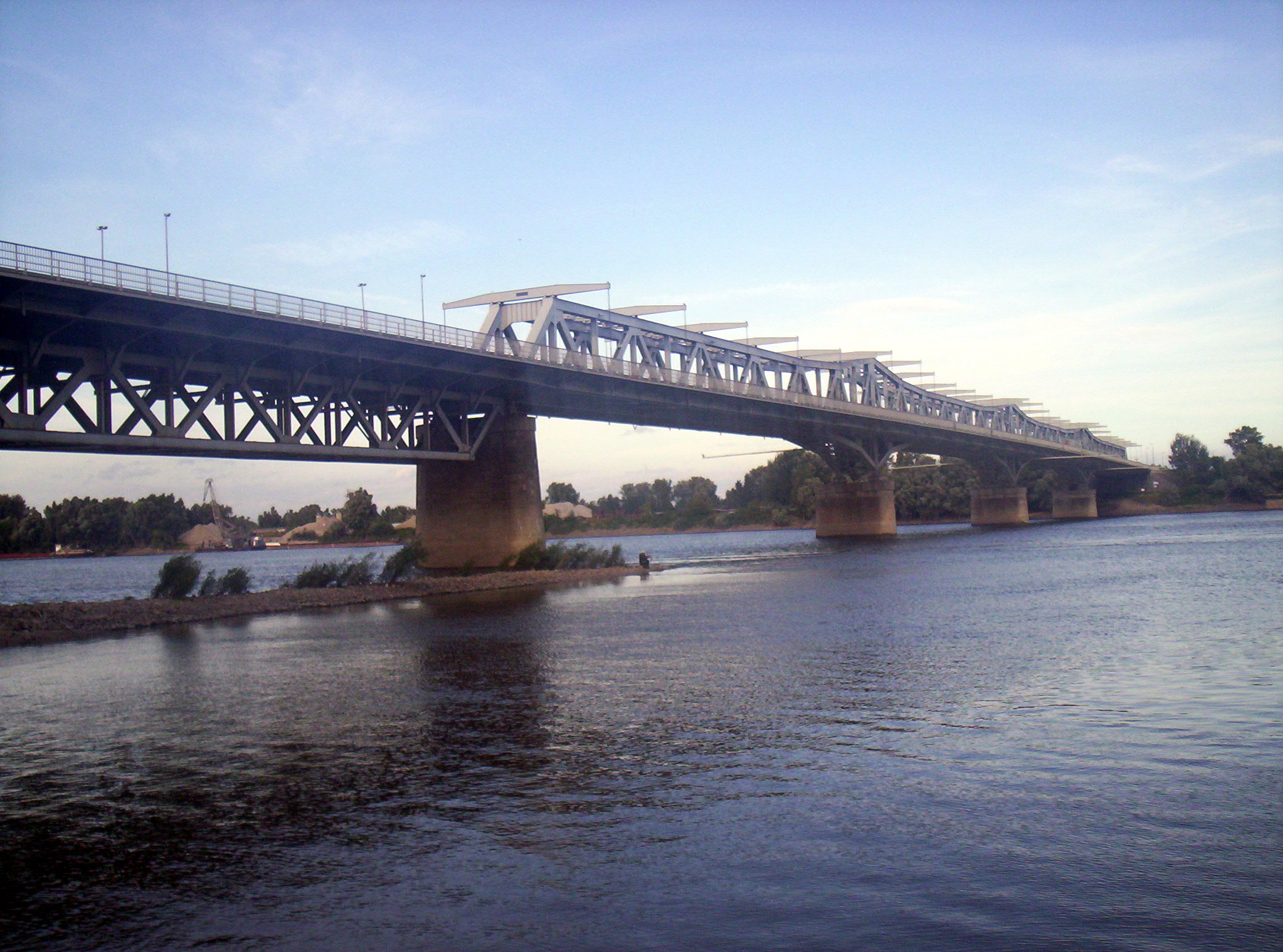
István Türr Bridge over the Danube

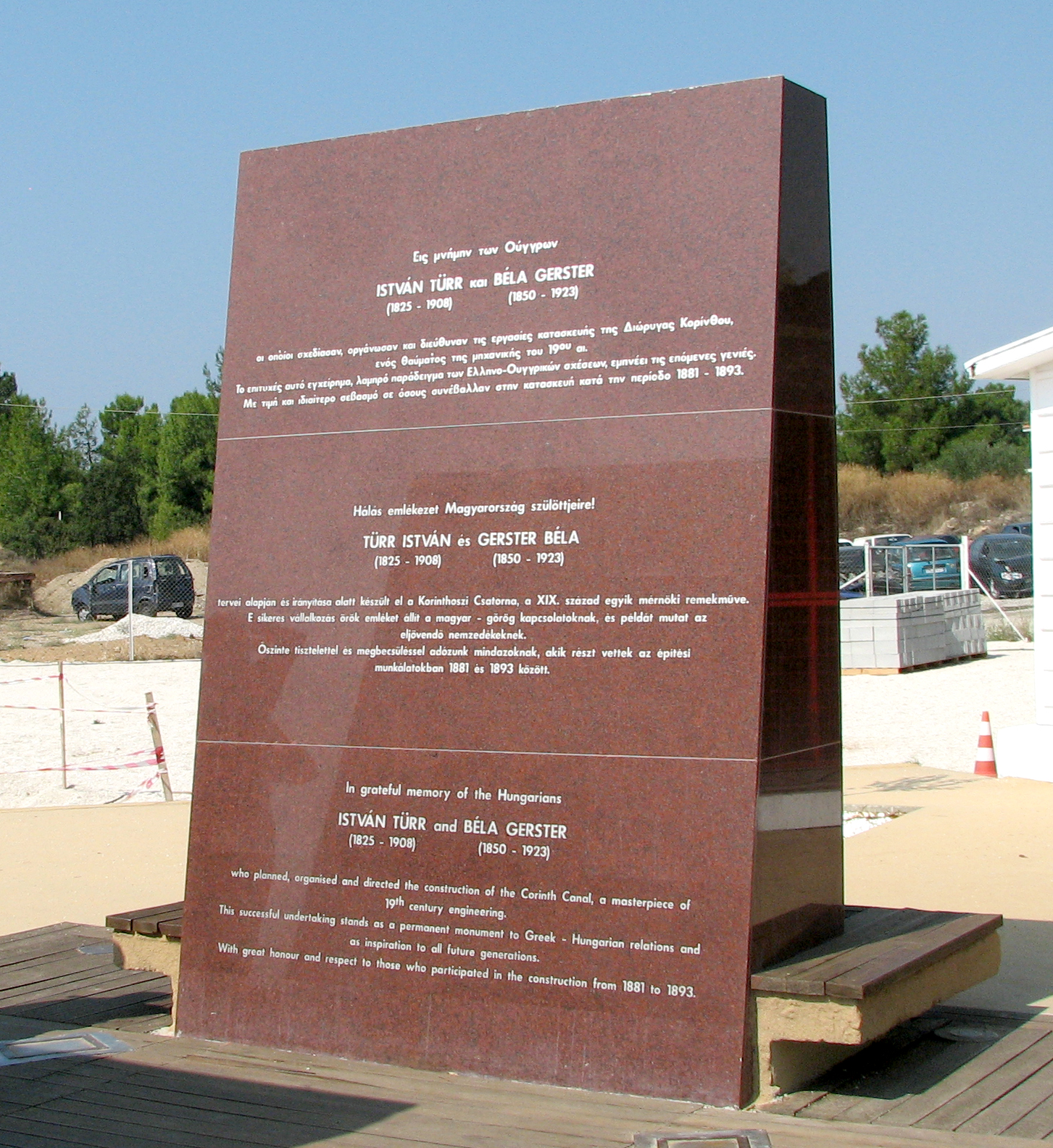
Memorial plaque to István Türr and Béla Gerster in Greek, Hungarian and English at the Corinth Canal

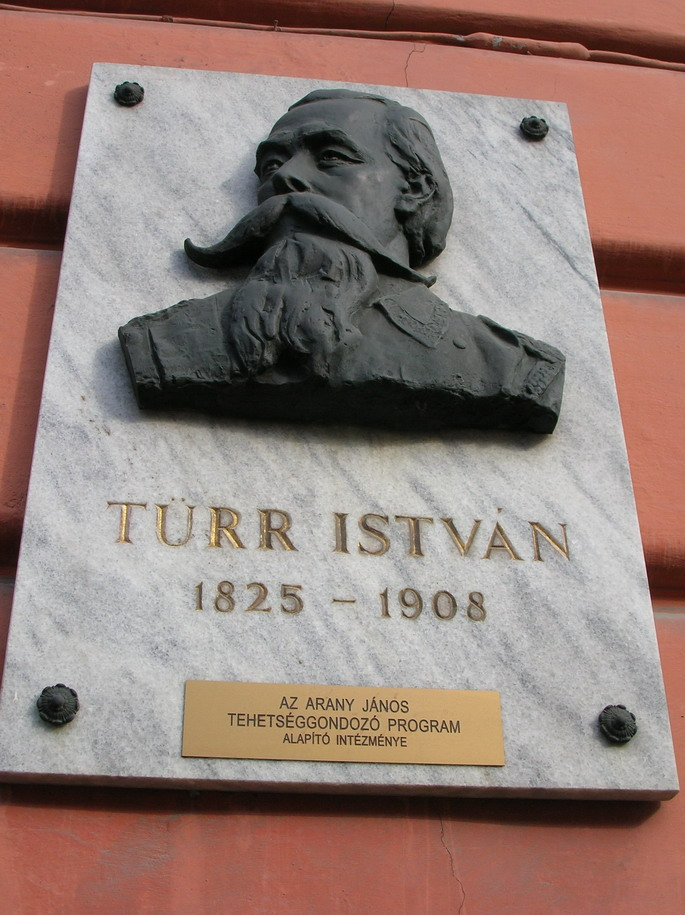
Plaque in the Istvan Turr Grammar School, Papa, Hungary

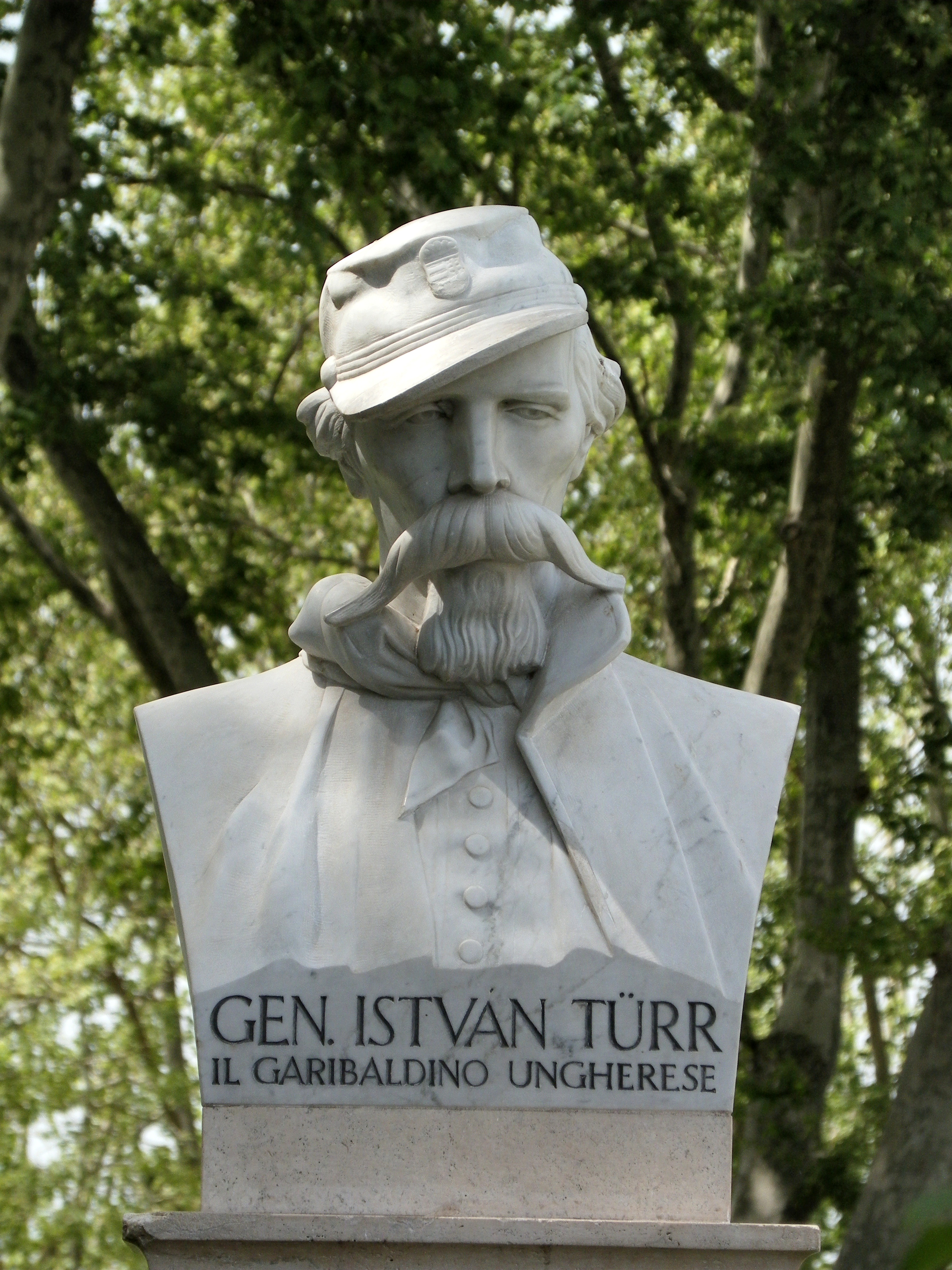
Statue of Türr in Rome

== Sources ==
- McCullough, David (1977). The Path Between the Seas: the creation of the Panama Canal 1870-1914. New York: Simon & Schuster. ISBN 0671244094.
