= Corinth Canal =

Canal in Greece

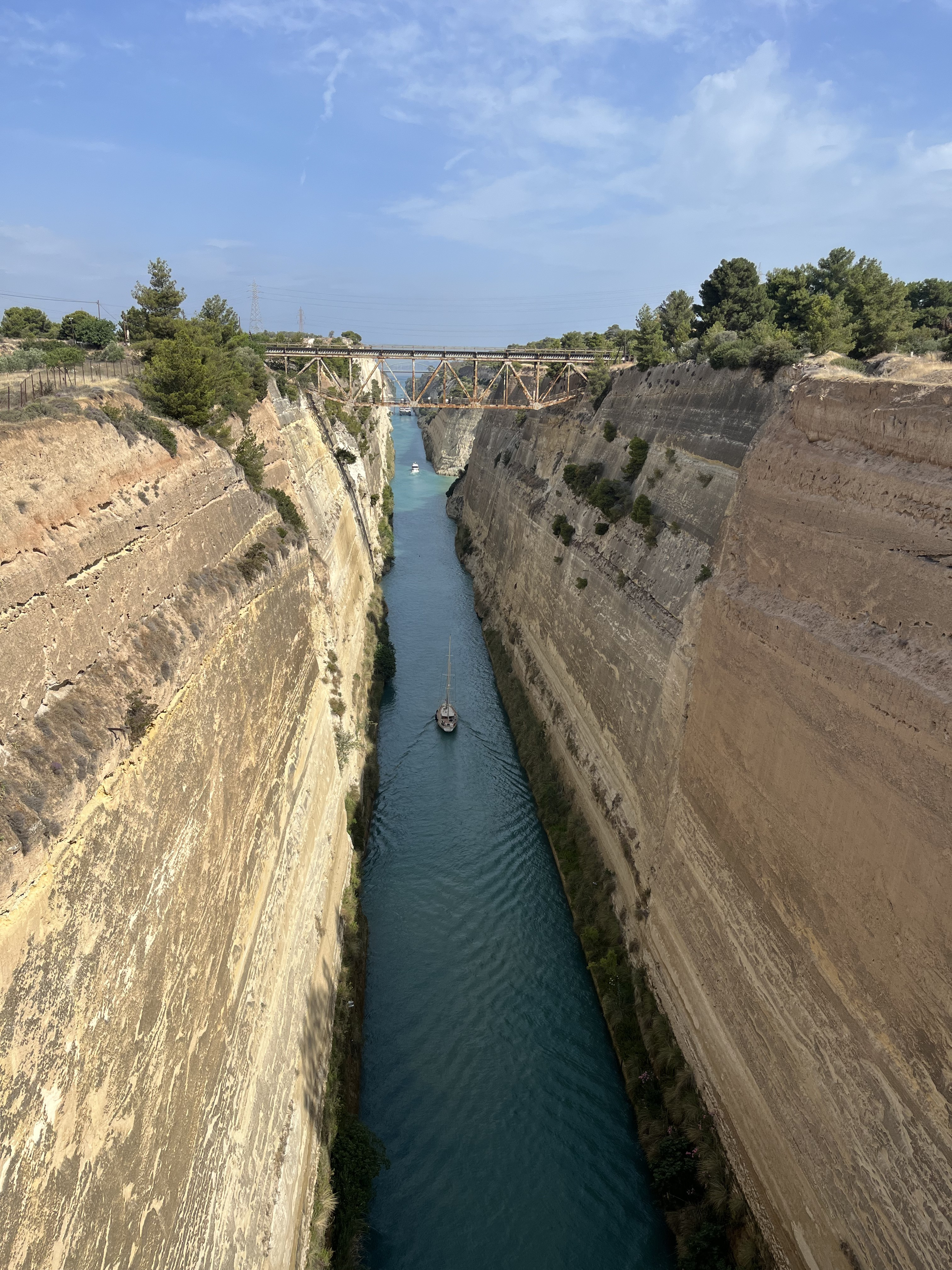
- Interactive map of Corinth Canal
- Location: Isthmus of Corinth
- Country: Greece
- Coordinates: 37°56′05″N 22°59′02″E

Specifications
- Length: 6.34 km (3.94 miles)
- Maximum boat beam: 24.6 m (81 ft)
- Maximum boat draft: 7.3 m (24 ft)
- Maximum boat air draft: 52 m (171 ft)
- Locks: 0
- Status: Open (reopened in June 1, 2023 after being closed since January 2021)
- Navigation authority: Corinth Canal S.A (A.E.DI.K)

History
- Principal engineer: István Türr and Béla Gerster
- Construction began: 67 AD (first attempt); 1881 (final attempt)
- Date of first use: 25 July 1893
- Date completed: 25 July 1893

The Corinth Canal (Greek: Διώρυγα της Κορίνθου, romanized: Dioryga tis Korinthou) is a canal in Greece that connects the Gulf of Corinth in the Ionian Sea with the Saronic Gulf in the Aegean Sea. Completed in 1893, it cuts through the narrow Isthmus of Corinth and separates the Peloponnese peninsula from the Greek mainland. The canal was dug through the Isthmus at sea level and has no locks. It is 6.4 kilometres (4 miles) in length and at 24.6 metres (80.7 feet) wide at sea level, it is impassable for many modern ships. It is currently of little economic importance and is mainly a tourist attraction.

The Corinth canal concept originated with Periander of Corinth in the 7th century BC. Daunted by its enormity, he chose to implement the Diolkos, a land trackway for transporting ships, instead. Construction of a canal finally began under Roman Emperor Nero in 67 AD, using Jewish prisoners captured during the First Jewish–Roman War. The project ceased shortly after his death. In subsequent centuries, the idea intrigued figures like Herodes Atticus in the second century and, following their conquest of the Peloponnese in 1687, the Venetians. Despite their interest, neither of them undertook the construction.

Construction finally recommenced in 1881 but was hampered by geological and financial problems that bankrupted the original builders. It was completed twelve years later, but, due to the canal's navigational problems, and periodic closures to repair landslides from its steep walls, as well as the rapid enlargement of commercial vessels during the 20th century, it failed to attract the level of traffic intended by its operators.

== History ==
The location of the Isthmus of Corinth; the modern canal is shown in light blue.

=== Ancient attempts ===
Several rulers of antiquity dreamed of digging a cutting through the isthmus. The first to propose such an undertaking was the tyrant Periander in the 7th century BC. The project was abandoned and Periander instead constructed a simpler and less costly overland portage road, named the Diolkos or stone carriageway, along which ships could be towed from one side of the isthmus to the other. Periander's change of heart is attributed variously to the great expense of the project, a lack of labour or a fear that a canal would have robbed Corinth of its dominant role as an entrepôt for goods. Remnants of the Diolkos still exist next to the modern canal.

The Diadoch Demetrius Poliorcetes (336–283 BC) planned to construct a canal as a means to improve his communication lines, but dropped the plan after his surveyors, miscalculating the levels of the adjacent seas, feared heavy floods.

The philosopher Apollonius of Tyana prophesied that anyone who proposed to dig a Corinthian canal would be met with illness. Three Roman rulers considered the idea but all suffered violent deaths; the historians Plutarch and Suetonius both wrote that the Roman dictator Julius Caesar considered digging a canal through the isthmus but was assassinated before he could begin the project. Caligula, the third Roman Emperor, commissioned a study in 40 AD from Egyptian experts who claimed incorrectly that the Corinthian Gulf was higher than the Saronic Gulf. As a result, they concluded, if a canal were dug the island of Aegina would be inundated. Caligula's interest in the idea got no further as he too was assassinated before making any progress.

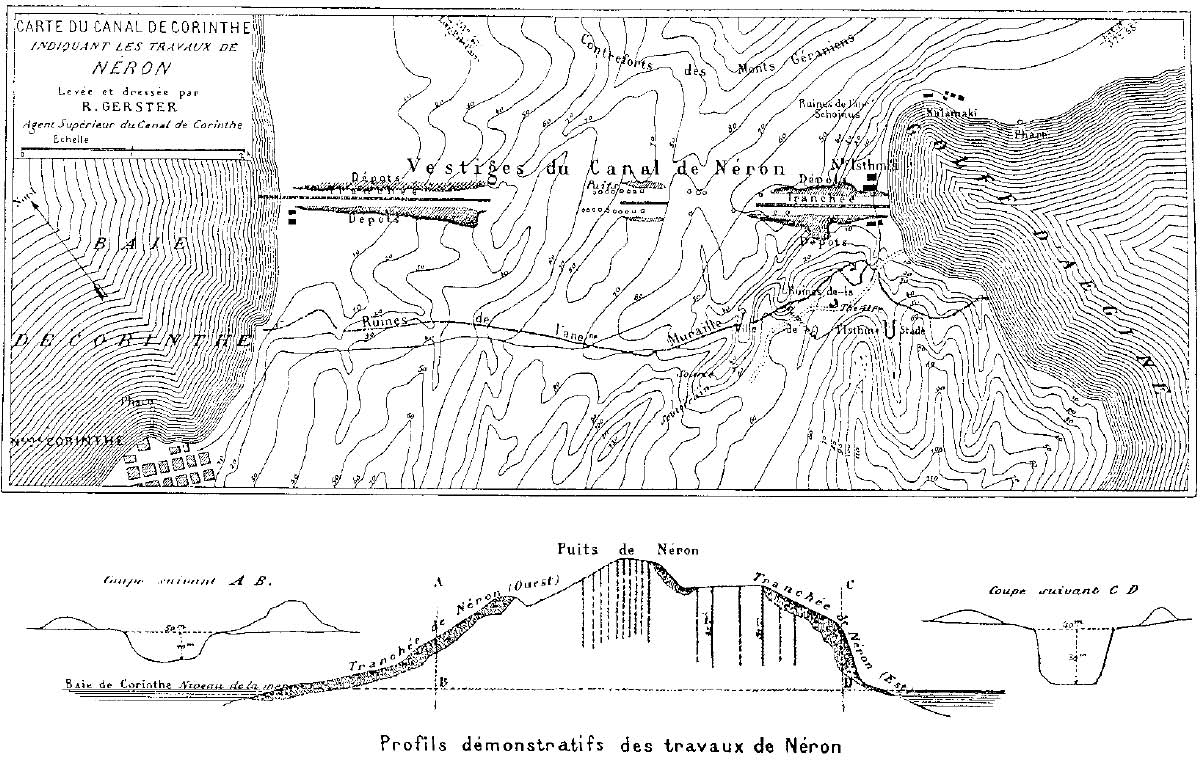
Remains of Nero's canal project in 1881

The emperor Nero was the first to attempt to construct the canal, personally breaking the ground with a pickaxe and removing the first basket-load of soil in 67 AD, but the project was abandoned when he died shortly afterwards. The Roman workforce, consisting of 6,000 Judean prisoners of war, started digging 40-to-50-metre-wide (130 to 160 ft) trenches from both sides, while a third group at the ridge drilled deep shafts for probing the quality of the rock, which were reused in 1881 for the same purpose.

According to Suetonius, the canal was dug to a distance of four stades – approximately 700 metres (2,300 ft) – or about a tenth of the total distance across the isthmus. A memorial of the attempt in the form of a relief of Hercules was left by Nero's workers and can be seen in the north side of the canal cutting today, at the Gulf of Corinth end, below an old bridge foundation. The modern canal follows the same course as Nero's.

The Greek philosopher and Roman senator Herodes Atticus is known to have considered digging a canal in the 2nd century AD, but did not get a project under way. The Venetians also considered it in 1687 after their conquest of the Peloponnese but likewise did not initiate any work on the ground.

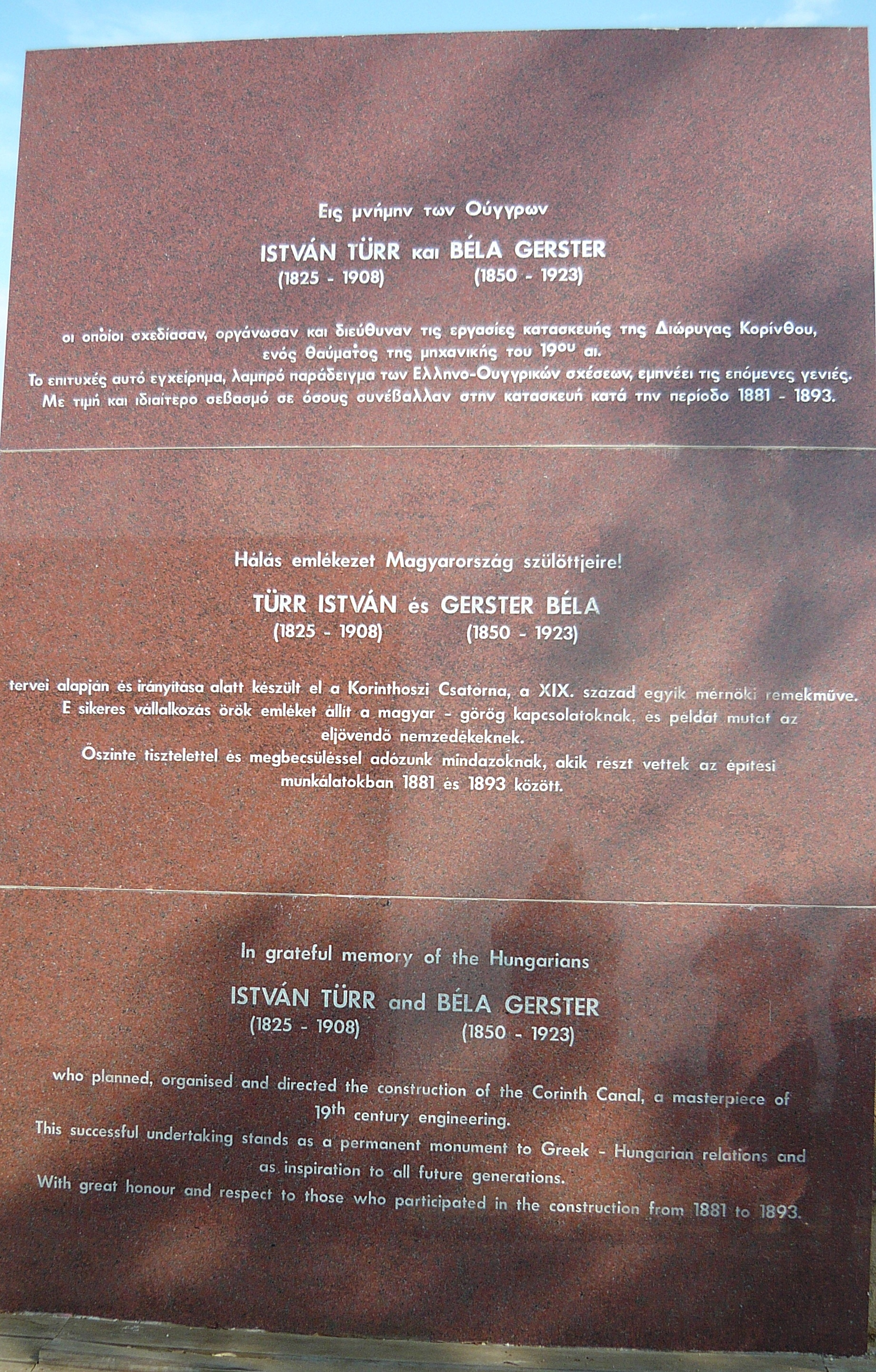
A monument at the Corinth Canal remembering the architects

=== Construction of the modern canal ===
The idea of a canal was revived after Greece gained formal independence from the Ottoman Empire in 1830. The Greek statesman Ioannis Kapodistrias asked a French engineer to assess the feasibility of the project but had to abandon it when its cost was assessed at 40 million gold francs—far too expensive for the newly independent country. Fresh impetus was given by the opening of the Suez Canal in 1869. In 1870, the government of Prime Minister Thrasyvoulos Zaimis passed a law authorizing the construction of a Corinth canal.

French entrepreneurs were put in charge, but following the bankruptcy of the French company that had attempted to dig the Panama Canal, French banks refused to lend money, and the company went bankrupt as well. In 1881, a fresh concession was granted to the Société Internationale du Canal Maritime de Corinthe, which was commissioned to construct the canal and operate it for the next 99 years. Construction was formally inaugurated on 23 April 1882 in the presence of King George I of Greece.

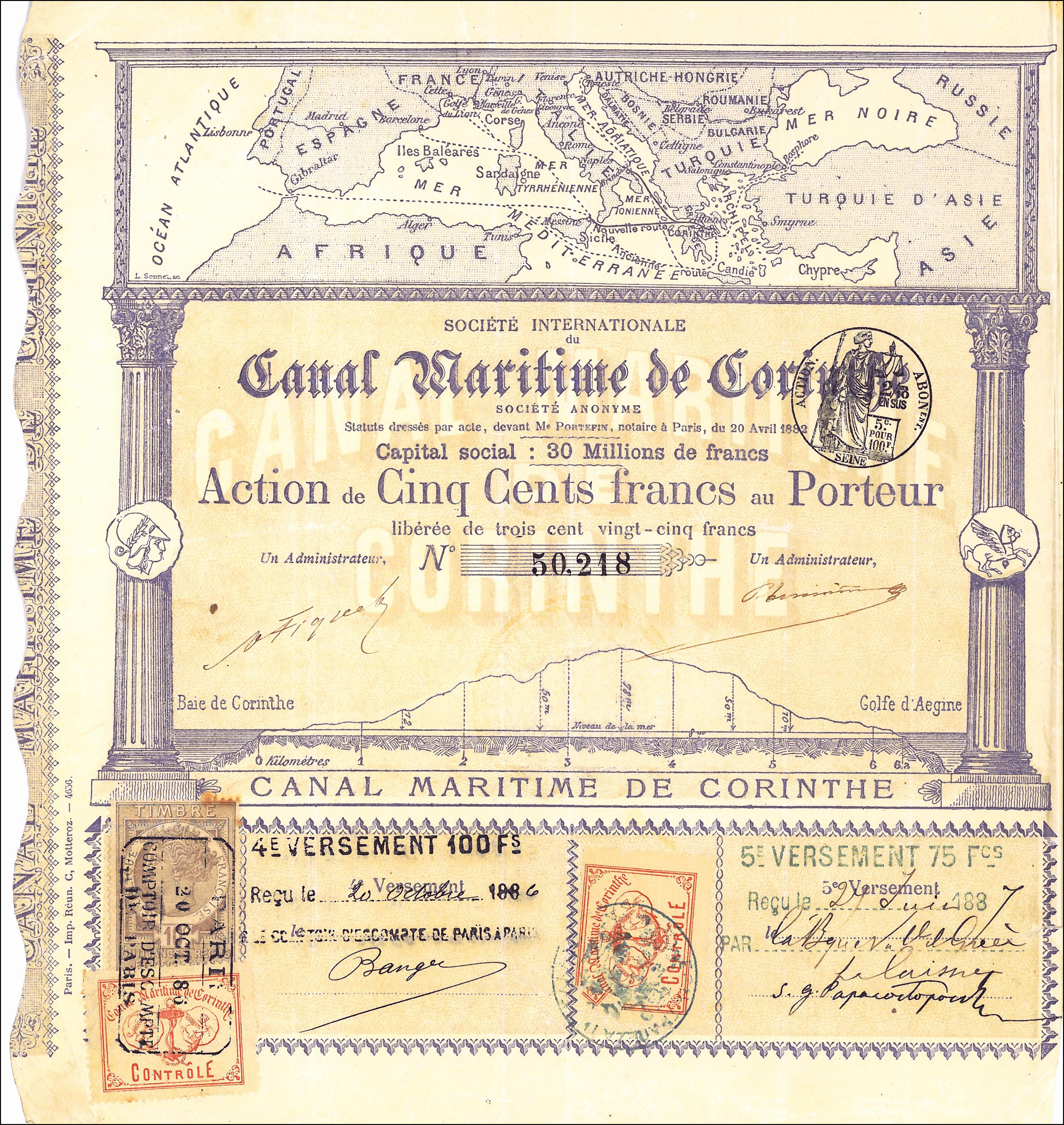
Share of the company Canal Maritime de Corinthe, issued 1882

The company's initial capital was 30,000,000 francs (US$6.0 million in the money of the day), but after eight years of work, it ran out of money, and a bid to issue 60,000 bonds of 500 francs each flopped when less than half of the bonds were sold. The company's head, István Türr, went bankrupt, as did the company itself and a bank that had agreed to raise additional funds for the project. Construction resumed in 1890, when the project was transferred to a Greek company, and was completed on 25 July 1893 after eleven years' work.

=== After completion ===
The canal experienced financial and operational difficulties after completion. The narrowness of the canal makes navigation difficult. Its high walls funnel wind along its length, and the different times of the tides in the two gulfs cause strong tidal currents in the channel. For these reasons, many ship operators were unwilling to use the canal, and traffic was far below predictions. Annual traffic of just under 4 million net tons had been anticipated, but by 1906 traffic had reached only half a million net tons annually. By 1913, the total had risen to 1.5 million net tons, but the disruption caused by World War I resulted in a major decline in traffic.

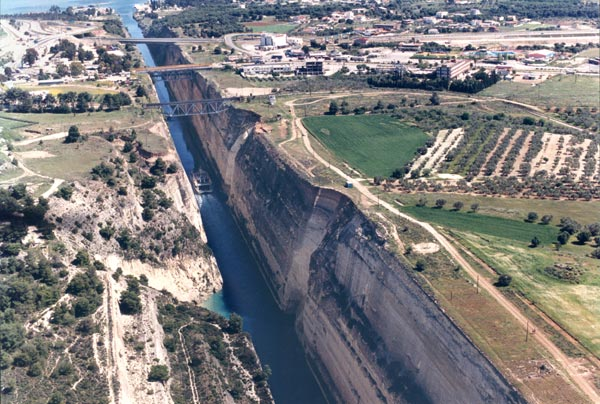
The Corinth Canal seen from the air, showing the steep limestone walls which proved vulnerable to landslides

Another persistent problem was the heavily faulted nature of the sedimentary rock, in an active seismic zone, through which the canal is cut. The canal's high limestone walls have been persistently unstable from the start. Although it was formally opened in July 1893, it was not opened to navigation until the November 1894, due to landslides. It was soon found that the wake from ships passing through the canal undermined the walls, causing further landslides. This required further expense in building retaining walls along the water's edge for more than half of the length of the canal, using 165,000 cubic metres of masonry. Between 1893 and 1940, it was closed for a total of four years for maintenance to stabilise the walls. In 1923 alone, 41,000 cubic metres of material fell into the canal, which took two years to clear out.

Serious damage was caused to the canal during World War II. On 26 April 1941, during the Battle of Greece between defending Allied troops and the invading forces of Nazi Germany, German parachutists and glider troops attempted to capture the main bridge over the canal. The bridge was defended by British and Anzac forces and had been wired for demolition. The Germans surprised the defenders with a glider-borne assault in the early morning of 26 April and captured the bridge, but the British set off the charges and destroyed the structure.

Other authors maintain that German pioneers cut the detonation wires, and a lucky hit by British artillery triggered the explosion, or that they were set off by a rifle shot from one of the British sappers. The bridge was replaced by a combined rail/road bridge built in 25 days by the IV Ferrovieri Battalion of the Royal Italian Army's Ferrovieri Engineer Regiment. Following the Axis occupation of Greece the Allies made several attempts to block the canal but without success.

In October 1944, as German forces retreated from Greece, the canal was put out of action by German "scorched earth" operations. German forces used explosives to trigger landslides to block the canal, destroyed the bridges and dumped locomotives, bridge wreckage and other infrastructure into the canal to hinder repairs. The United States Army Corps of Engineers began to clear the canal in November 1947 and reopened it for shallow-draft traffic by 7 July 1948, and for all traffic by that September.

=== Modern use ===
Because the canal is difficult to navigate for large vessels, it is mostly used by smaller recreational boats. A notable exception occurred on 9 October 2019, when the cruise ship MS Braemar became the widest and longest ship to transit the canal.

The canal closed at the beginning of 2021 after a landslide. It re-opened in June 2022 until October 2022. After further safety measures, the canal reopened on June 1, 2023.

== Layout ==
The sea-level canal consists of a single lock-free 6,343-metre (20,810 ft) channel excavated 8 metres (26 ft) deep, 24.6 metres (81 ft) in breadth at the surface, and 21.3 metres (70 ft) wide at the bottom. The rock walls, which rise 90 metres (300 ft) above sea level, are at a near-vertical 80° angle. The canal is crossed by a railway line, a road, and a motorway at a height of about 45 metres (148 ft). In 1988, submersible bridges were installed at sea level at each end of the canal, by the eastern harbour of Isthmia and the western harbour of Poseidonia, providing two additional crossings for road traffic.

The canal saves a 700-kilometre (430 mi) journey around the Peloponnese for transiting vessels. It is too narrow and shallow for large, deep-drafted oceangoing vessels, accommodating a maximum of 24.6 metres (81 ft) in width and 7.3 metres (24 ft) in draft. In October 2019, the 22.5-metre-wide (74 ft), 195-metre-long (640 ft), 900-passenger cruise ship Braemar set a new record for longest ship to pass through the canal.

Ships can pass through the canal only one convoy at a time on a one-way system. Larger ships have to be towed by tugs. The canal is currently used mainly by tourist ships; around 15,000 ships per year (an average of about 40 per day) travel through the waterway.

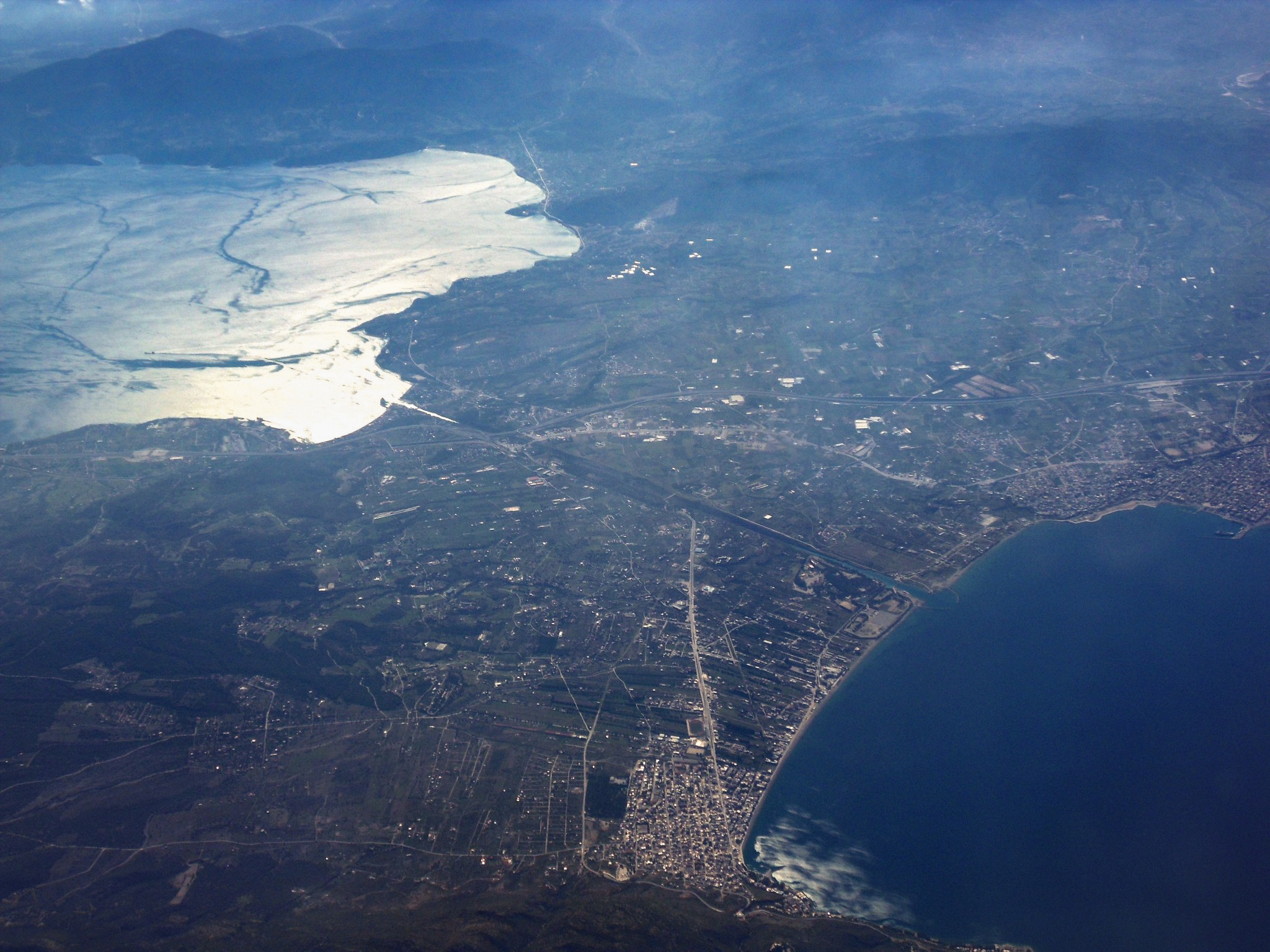
An aerial photograph of the Corinth Canal area (2011)

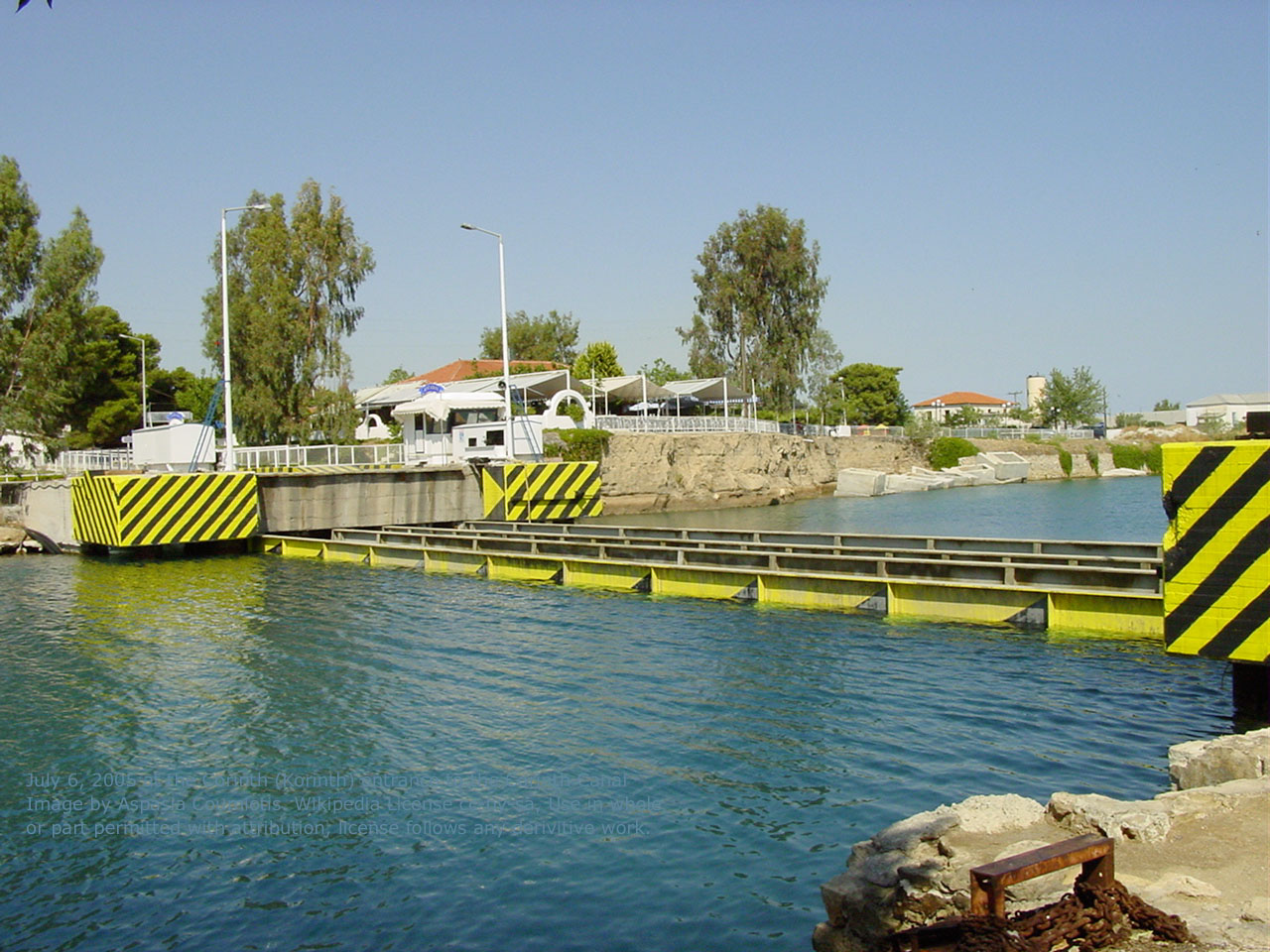
A submersible bridge at the entrance to the Corinth Canal

== See also ==
- Canal des Deux Mers
- Diolkos
- Portage railway
