= Lucien Bonaparte-Wyse =

French engineer

Lucien Napoléon Bonaparte-Wyse
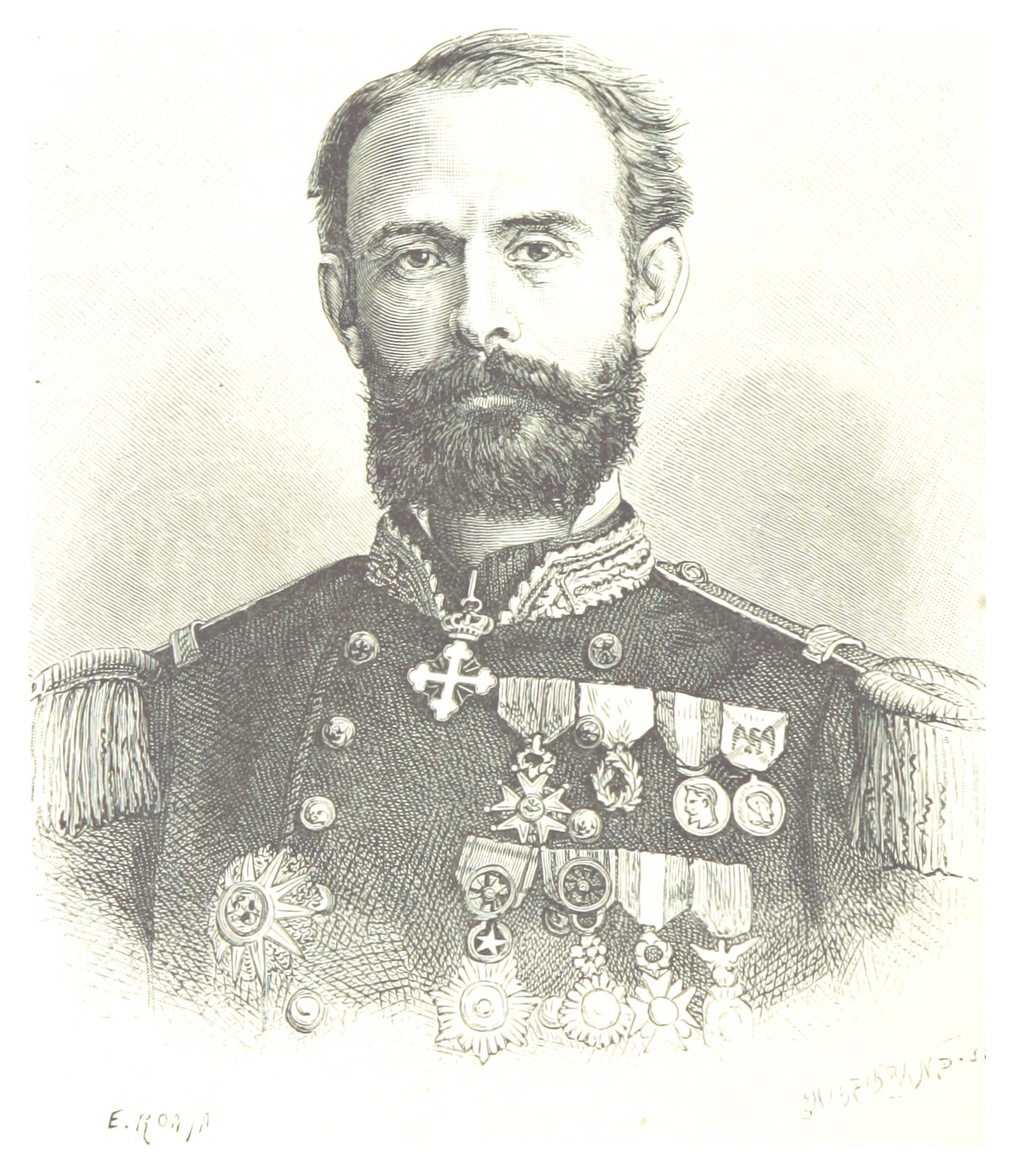
- Lucien Bonaparte-Wyse
- Born: 13 January 1845; Paris
- Died: 15 June 1909 (aged 64); Cap Brun, Cannes
- Occupations: Engineer, Midshipman (French Navy)
- Spouse: Mary Rose White (m. 1871, d. 1875)
- Children: Napoléon Jérôme Bonaparte-Wyse (1874–1940); Spouse: Antoinette de Raoulx de Raousset-Boulbon (1881–1931); Children: One daughter and one son; Marie Letizia Bonaparte-Wyse (1875–1959); Spouse: Rear Admiral Aristide Henry Nicolas Denis Bergasse du Petit-Thouars (1872–1932); Children: Four daughters
- Parents: Captain Studholme John Hodgson (biological) (father); Laetitia Bonaparte-Wyse (daughter of Lucien Bonaparte) (mother)

Lucien Napoléon Bonaparte-Wyse (13 January 1845 – 15 June 1909), also known as Lucien Napoléon-Bonaparte Wyse, was a French engineer. He was instrumental in the decision to build the Panama Canal in Panama as a sea-level canal.

== Life ==
=== Family background ===
He was born in Paris as the son of Laetitia Bonaparte-Wyse, daughter of Lucien Bonaparte and estranged wife of the Irish politician Sir Thomas Wyse; Lucien Napoléon Bonaparte-Wyse's real father was a British army officer, Captain Studholme John Hodgson. His eldest sister Marie Bonaparte-Wyse (1831-1902) led an influential literary salon in Paris in the 1860s and in 1873 married the Piedmontese statesman Urbano Rattazzi. His other full sister Laetitia married the Hungarian freedom fighter István Türr.

=== Early career ===
He joined the French navy as a midshipman on the ship Amphion, based in Toulon.

=== Involvement with the Panama Canal ===
In 1875, he became one of the directors of the Societe Civile Internationale du Canal Interoceanique de Darien (also known as the "Türr Syndicate"). The syndicate, headed by his brother-in-law General István Türr, had been formed to promote the building of an interoceanic canal across Panama.

Between 1876 and 1878, the company sent Bonaparte-Wyse together with French naval officer Lt Armand Reclus and Hungarian engineer Béla Gerster on two expeditions to Panama with the task of locating the most suitable route for the canal. During the second expedition, Lt Reclus carried out a cursory inspection of the terrain around Panama City, while Bonaparte-Wyse rode by horseback to Bogotá, where he obtained a concession from the Colombian government to build a canal across Panama (at that time part of Colombia). The agreement, known as the "Wyse Concession" was valid 99 years and allowed the company to dig a canal and exploit it.

Returning to Paris, Bonaparte-Wyse and Reclus submitted a report to the French entrepreneur Ferdinand de Lesseps, claiming that a sea-level canal across the Panama isthmus was feasible. Gerster wrote a minority report dissenting from their conclusions, but was unable to find a publisher.

In 1879, the Türr Syndicate sold its financial interest, including the Wyse Concession, to a company headed by Ferdinand de Lesseps (Compagnie universelle du canal interocéanique de Panama). The syndicate's directors (including Türr and Bonaparte-Wyse) realised a profit on their investment of more than 3000 percent. Their withdrawal from the project saved them from public responsibility for the collapse of the French Panama project and the appalling loss of thousands of workers to disease at Panama.

After the collapse of the Compagnie universelle du canal interocéanique de Panama in 1889, the liquidators sent Bonaparte-Wyse back to Bogotá, where he was able to get the Wyse Concession extended. After this, he wrote his memoirs, intending to prove to investors that the project was viable. The United States would later buy the concession and build the canal.

=== Marriage and family ===
He married on 14 September 1871, in London, Mary Rose White (Port-au-Prince 1855 - Nice 1875) :

- Napoléon Jérôme Bonaparte-Wyse (1874-1940) married in 1904 Antoinette de Raoulx de Raousset-Boulbon (1881-1931). They had one daughter and one son.
- Marie Letizia Bonaparte-Wyse (1875-1959) married in 1895, in Toulon, Rear Admiral Aristide Henry Nicolas Denis Bergasse du Petit-Thouars (1872-1932). They had four daughters.

=== Death ===
He died at Cap Brun in Cannes on 15 June 1909, at the age of 64 years.

== Publications ==
- Excursion en Tunisie, p. 520-527, Bulletin de la Société de Géographie, 1874, tome 7 (lire en ligne)
- Correspondance de Lucien Napoléon-Bonaparte Wyse du 29 décembre 1876, p. 315-319, Bulletin de la Société de Géographie, 1877, tome 13 (lire en ligne)
- Correspondance de Lucien Napoléon-Bonaparte Wyse du 5 avril 1877, p. 647-654, Bulletin de la Société de Géographie, 1877, tome 13 (lire en ligne)
- Lucien Napoléon-Bonaparte Wyse, Exploration de l'isthme américain en vue du percement d'un canal interocéanique, p. 573-580, Bulletin de la Société de Géographie, 1879, tome 17 (lire en ligne)
- Rapports sur les travaux de la Société de géographie, p. 26-27, Bulletin de la Société de Géographie, 1879, tome 17 (lire en ligne)
- Correspondance du 5 février 1880, p. 272-276, Bulletin de la Société de Géographie, 1880, tome 19 (lire en ligne)
- Bonaparte Wyse, Lucien Napoléon; Guillaumin, Georges (1904). Le rapt de Panama (PDF) (in French).
