= Béla Gerster =

Hungarian architect

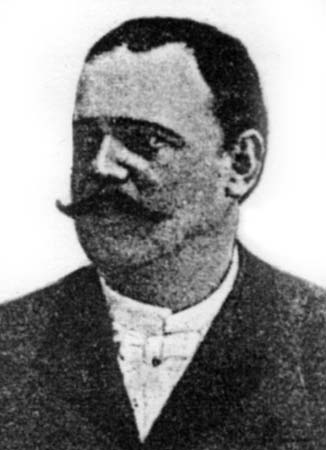
- Béla Gerster
- Born: Béla Gerster; 20 October 1850; Kassa, Kingdom of Hungary, Austrian Empire (today Košice, Slovakia)
- Died: 3 August 1923; Budapest, Hungary
- Education: TU Wien, Vienna
- Occupation: Architect

Béla Gerster, also known by his Slovak name as Vojtech Mikuláš Gerster (20 October 1850 – 3 August 1923), was a Hungarian engineer and canal architect. He took part in an early expedition to determine the route of the Panama Canal, and was the chief engineer of the Corinth Canal.

== Early life and education ==
Béla Gerster was born in 1850 at Kassa (then in the Austrian Empire, at present in Slovakia’s Košice) . He graduated from the Vienna University of Technology and he also started his profession in this city as a civil engineer.

== Career ==
As an expert on water constructions, Gerster accompanied Lucien Bonaparte-Wyse and Lt. Armand Réclus in two expeditions in 1876-1878 commissioned to locate the most suitable route for an interoceanic canal. The leaders of the team wrote a report claiming that s sea-level canal across the Panama Isthmus was feasible. Gerster wrote a minority report pointing out the inadequate nature of the survey and the potential difficulties of the project, but was unable to find a publisher.

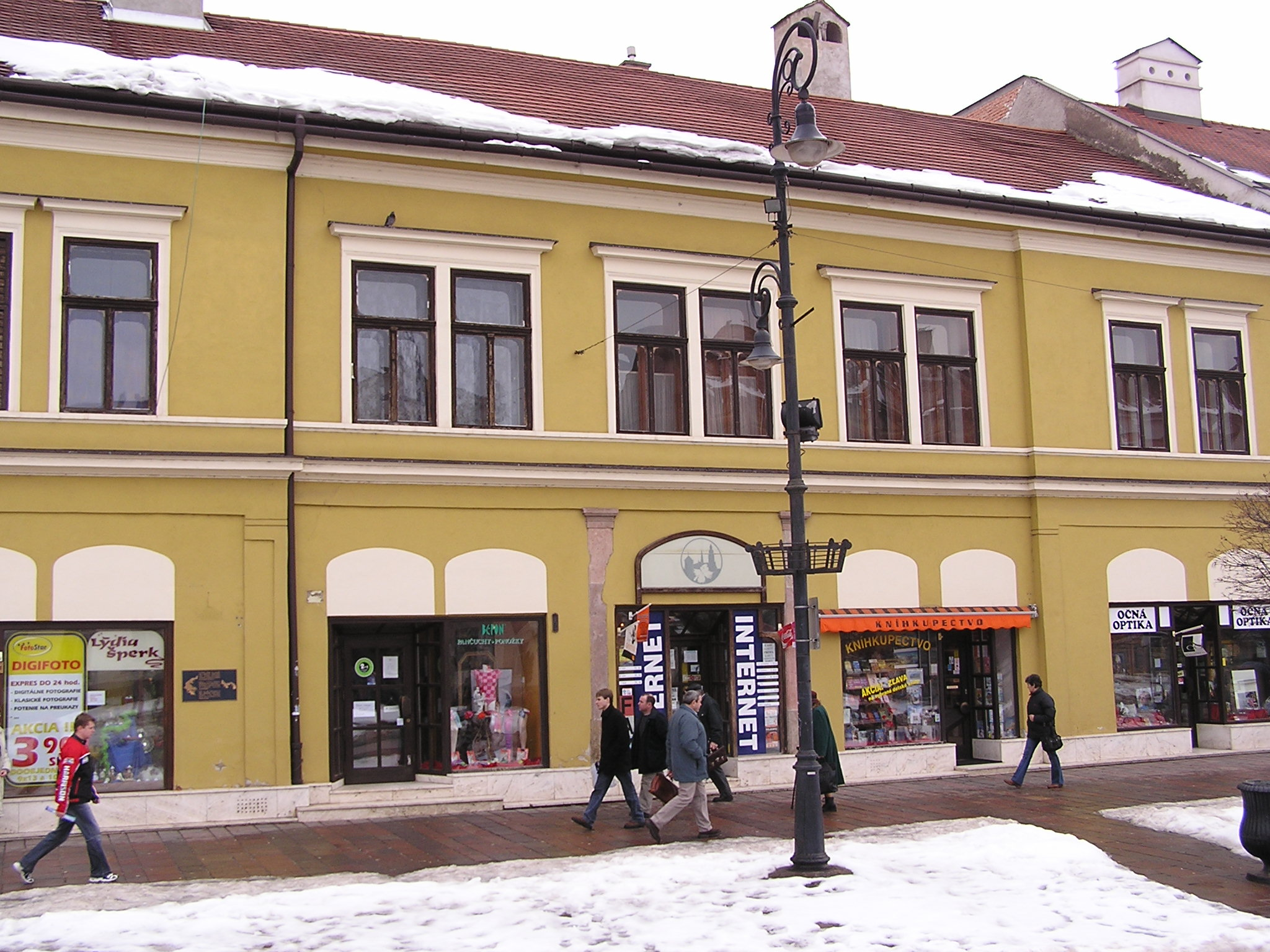
The birthplace of Béla Gerster at Hlavná Street in Košice, Slovakia

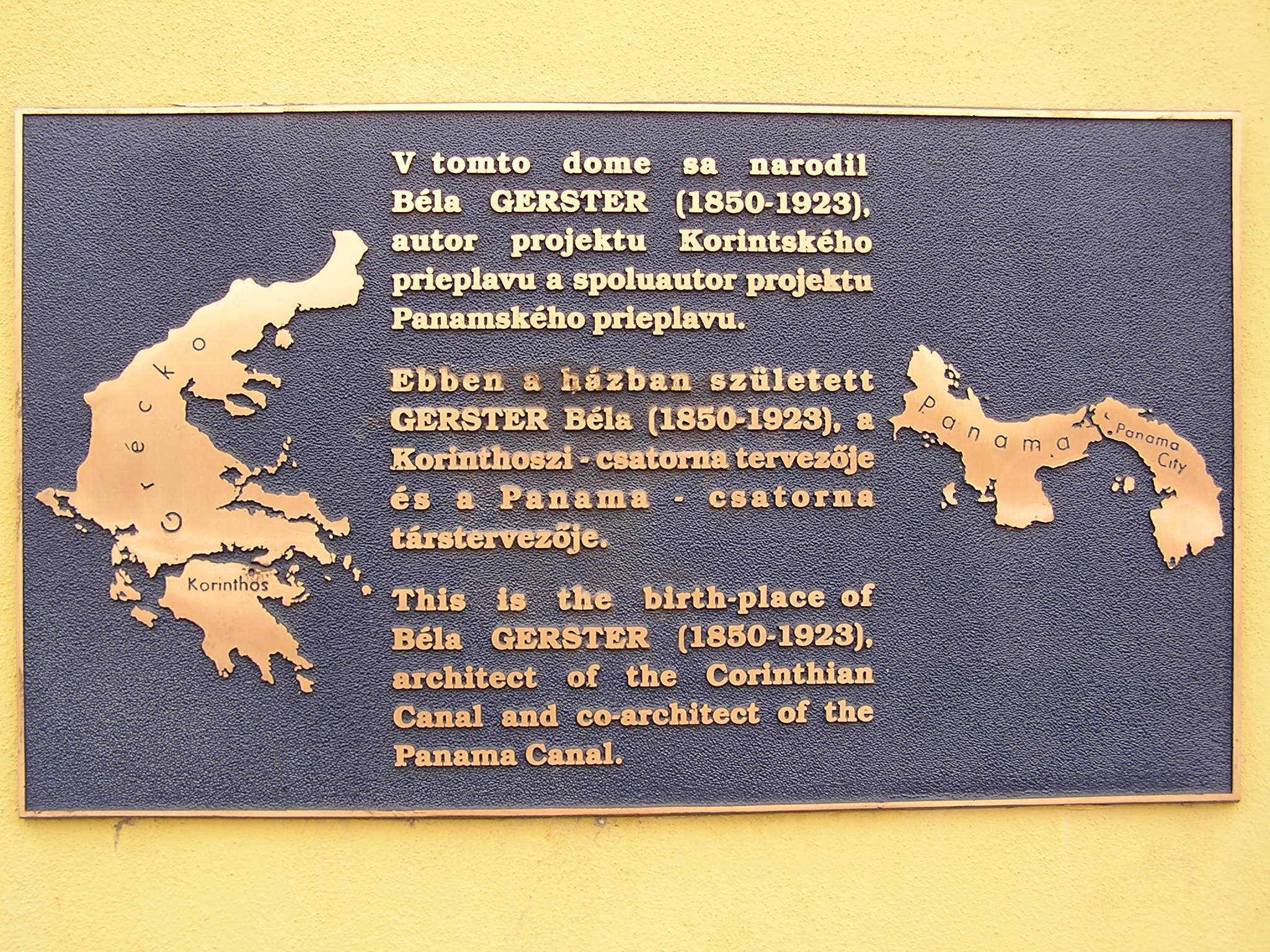
The memorial plate of Béla Gerster in his birthplace

After István Türr was granted permission by the Greek government to revive the long abandoned idea works of cutting through of the Corinthian Isthmus (it was Emperor Nero who first attempted this in 68 AD). Gerster was given charge over making the plans in 1881. Afterwards he supervised the whole project as the chief engineer of the canal building company; his co-workers in this endeavour were another four Hungarian engineers: István Kauser, László Nyári, Garibaldi Pulszky and István Stéghmüller. The construction lasted for 11 years (1882–1893). The Corinth Canal is 6,343 metres long; its width amounts to 25 metres, its depth 8 metres and the earth cliffs flanking it reach a maximum height of 63 metres. Gerster wrote about his experiences in his Hungarian-French bilingual book "A korinthusi földszoros és átmetszése" / "Cutting through the Corinthian Isthmus". This book features a lot of photographs, construction drawings and maps. He also laid out a railway line from Athens to Larisa.

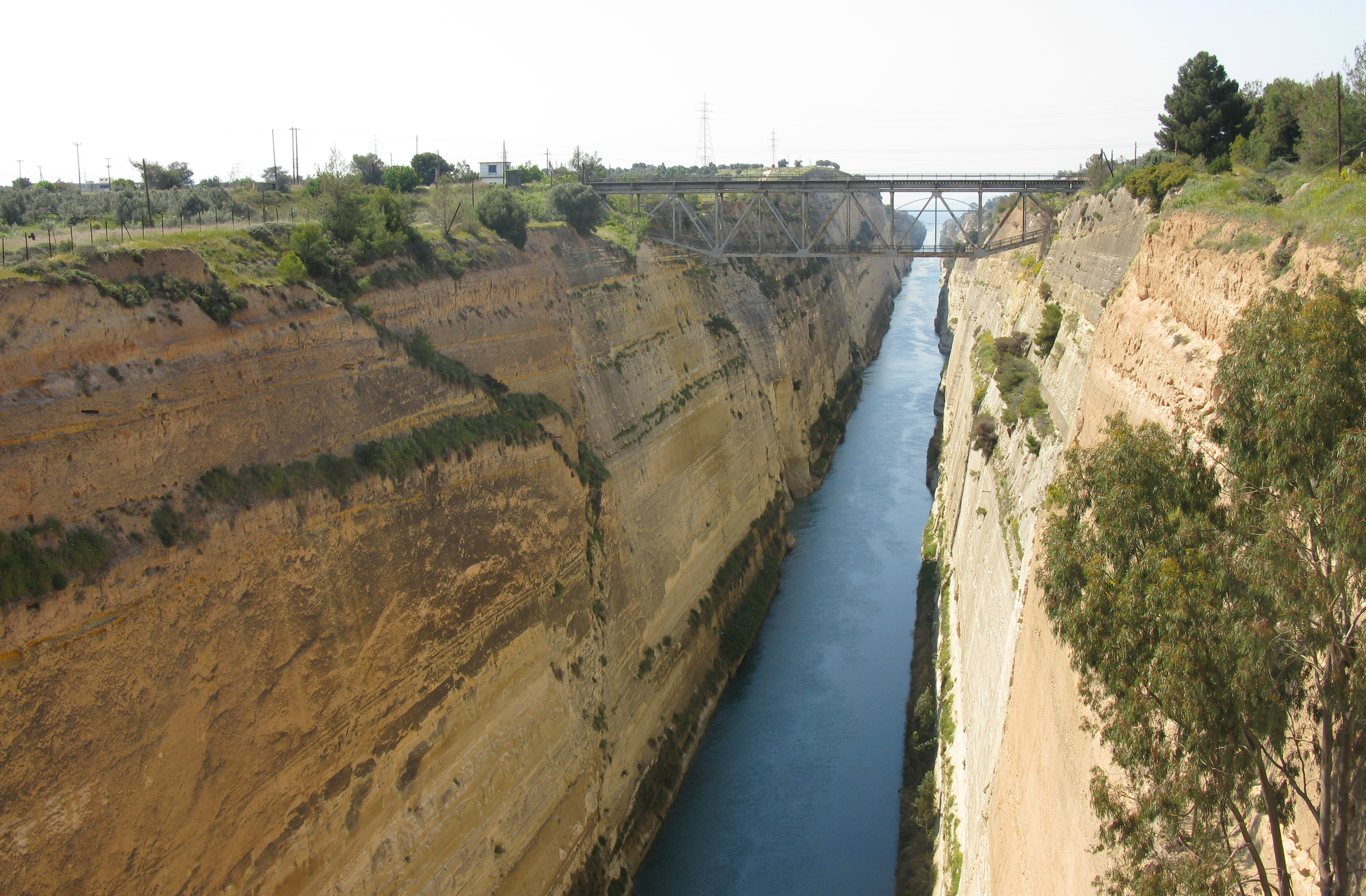
Béla Gerster worked as chief engineer of the Corinth Canal

He participated in the development of István Türr's monumental plans of water-supply engineering in Hungary. Later on he conducted the designing, construction and building of 13 major railway lines in Hungary. Lastly, in 1919 he administered the works at the Duna-Tisza Canal. He died in Budapest, Hungary in 1923.

== See also ==
- History of the Panama Canal
