= Reclus family =

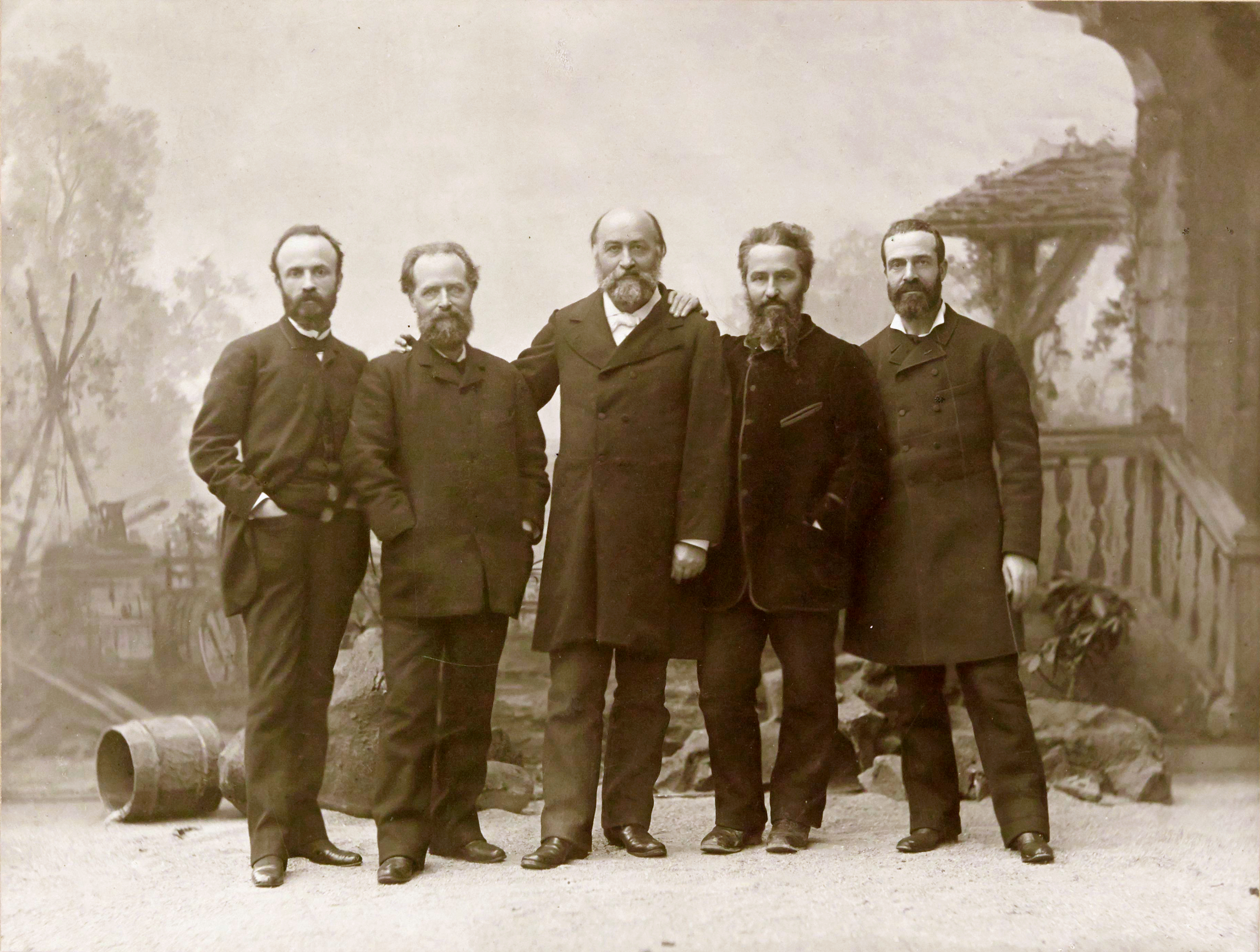
The Reclus brothers in 1889. From left to right: Paul, Élisée, Élie, Onésime, and Armand

The Reclus family includes the children and extended family of pastor Jacques Reclus (1796–1882) and teacher Zéline Reclus (1805–1887). The Reclus family's notoriety is primarily the result of Jacques and Zéline's five sons: Élie, Élisée, Paul, Armand, and Onésime. The family became known for their distinctive careers in geography, anarchism, journalism, medicine, and other fields during the 19th and 20th centuries.

The Reclus family originated in Le Fleix, a village 5 km from Sainte-Foy-la-Grande. The family included landowners, coopers, and educated persons. The family was part of France's Protestant minority.

== Jacques Reclus ==
Jacques Reclus was the son of Jeanne Virolle (1767–1819) and Jean Reclus (1760–1848). Jacques was a pastor in Montcaret and taught at Sainte-Foy-La-Grande's Protestant college. Resigning from the national church, Jacques led a group of "dissident peasants" in creating an independent church in Orthez.

== Zéline Reclus ==
Zéline Reclus was born in La Roche-Chalais on January 25, 1805. Zéline was the daughter of Pierre Pascal Trigant de la Faniouse (1775–1840) and Rosalie Gast (1784–1871). She married Jacques Reclus at the age of 19. In 1834, Zéline opened a school in Orthez.

Zéline earned a qualification as a boarding mistress (Maîtresse de Pension). She was praised as a "zealous" and "highly educated" teacher. A local, Francis Jammes, wrote that "every student left [the school] singularly distinguished in manners, whatever class they came from". She taught at the school until 1886.

== The Five Reclus Brothers ==
During their childhoods, the Reclus family was then based in Sainte-Foy-la-Grande, in the Gironde region of the Nouvelle-Aquitaine department in Southwestern France. Of the siblings, Élie and Élisée were particularly close and influenced their brothers and sisters. Élisée and Élie contributed to early feminist activity in France as part of a milieu of anarchist geographers and militant feminists that developed in the 19th Century.

=== Élie Reclus (1827–1904) ===
Élie was an anarchist and ethnographer, and the eldest of the five brothers. He wrote on a wide variety of cultural and political topics, including in opposition to circumcision. He supported work to improve women's educational opportunities. His son Paul produced anarchist propaganda and married the anarchist militant Marguerite Wapler.

=== Élisée Reclus (1830–1905) ===
Élisée was a geographer, writer, and anarchist. He was responsible for producing the 19-volume La Nouvelle Géographie universelle, la terre et les hommes. He initiated of the Anti-Marriage Movement. He collaborated with anarchist contemporaries Errico Malatesta, Luigi Galleani, Mikhail Bakunin, and Peter Kropotkin. He was a supporter of the Paris Commune. Later in life he was the chair of comparative geography at the Free University of Brussels. He was a noted advocate for vegetarianism.

=== Onésime Reclus (1837–1916) ===
Onésime was a geographer, with a particular interest in the relationship between France and its colonies. He wrote widely on geography and culture, and contributed to the journal Tour du monde. He coined the term "Francophone".

=== Armand Reclus (1843–1927) ===
Armand was a geographer and French naval engineer. Armand took part in French colonial campaigns in the China Seas, Japan, and Indochina. He explored the Darién Province, and contributed to the development of the Panama Canal by proposing its route. At the end of his life, the President of the Republic made him an Officer of the Legion of Honor. His politics contrasted with his brothers' anarchism. He was a friend of Lucien Napoléon Bonaparte-Wyse.

=== Paul Reclus (1847–1914) ===
Paul was a surgeon. He researched local anesthetics, and "Reclus' disease" (fibrocystic breast changes) is named for him.

== The Six Reclus Sisters ==
The six daughters of Jacques and Zéline Reclus who reached adulthood were well educated and became tutors in English or German families, or worked in the school that their mother ran. Reflecting the times that they lived in, they did not receive the same fame as their brothers, although several of the sisters assisted their brothers in their personal or professional lives. The sisters especially admired Élisée; on one occasion, Noémi wrote to her friend "You know that great joy that is coming to us, a visit from Élisée! The wretch stayed twenty-four hours at most, visits and sleeping stole many of these precious moments from us".

The six sisters were:

- Loïs Reclus (1832–1917)
- Marie Reclus (1834–1918)
- Zéline Reclus (1836–1911)
- Louise Reclus (1839–1917)
- Noémi Reclus (1841–1915)
- Ioana (or Johanna) Reclus (1845–1937)

== Family Tree ==
- Jean-Louis Reclus (1760–1848) and his wife Jeanne Virolle (1767–1819)
  - Jacques Reclus (1796–1882), pastor
    1. Élie Reclus (1827–1904), ethnographer and anarchist. Husband of Noémi Reclus.
      - André Reclus (1861 – 1936), a farmer in Morocco and Algeria
      - Paul Reclus (1858–1941), engineer, teacher, and anarchist
        - Jacques Reclus (1894–1984), Chinese-French translator and anarchist
    2. Élisée Reclus (1830–1905), geographer and anarchist
      - Marguerite Reclus (1860–1953)
      - Jeanne Reclus (1863–1897)
    3. Loïs Reclus (1832–1917)
    4. Marie Reclus (1834–1918)
    5. Zéline Reclus (1836–1911)
      - Jean-Louis Faure (1863–1944)
      - Élie Faure (1873–1937)
    6. Onésime Reclus (1837–1916), geographer
      - Maurice Reclus (1883–1972), historian
    7. Louise Reclus (1839–1917)
    8. Noémi Reclus (1841–1915)
    9. Armand Reclus (1843–1927), geographer
    10. Ioana (Johanna) Reclus (1845–1937)
      - Élisée Bouny (1872–1900)
      - François Bouny (1885–1965)
    11. Paul Reclus (1847–1914), surgeon
  - Jean Reclus (1794–1859) and his wife Jeanne Ducos.
    1. Pauline Kergomard (1838–1925), educator
    2. Noémi Reclus (1828–1905), educator and wife of Élie Reclus.
      - André Reclus (1861–1936), a farmer in Morocco and Algeria
      - Paul Reclus (1858–1941), engineer, teacher, and anarchist
        - Jacques Reclus (1894–1984), Chinese-French translator and anarchist

== Bibliography ==
- Les Amis de Sainte-Foy et sa région
  - Hélène Sarrazin (prés.), Scènes d'une pauvre vie par le pasteur Jacques Reclus, 1992, cahier 1, p. 13-27, link.
  - Pr Félix Lejars, Éloge de Paul Reclus lu à la Société de chirurgie de Paris le 22 janvier 1919, reproduit en 1992, cahier 2, p. 25-35, link.
  - Jean-Pierre Faure (fils d’Élie Faure), Recherches sur l'esthétique d'Élie Faure, 1992, cahier 2, p. 40-45, link.
  - Alain Leduc, Henry Miller, lecteur d'Élie Faure, n° 63, 1993, p. 38-44, link.
  - Marie-Madeleine Guesnon, Famille Reclus, n° 69, 1996, p. 19-31, link.
  - Danièle Provain, Note sur Élisée Reclus, n° 69, 1996, p. 32-35, link.
  - Roger Gonot, Faisons connaissance avec Onésime Reclus, n° 70, 1997, p. 33-53, link.
  - Roger Gonot, Physionomies : Élie Reclus (1827-1904), Élisée Reclus (1830-1905), Onésime Reclus (1843-1916), n° 73, 1998, p. 4-19, link.
  - Jean Suret-Canale, Élisée Reclus et le darwinisme, n° 73, 1998, p. 20-21, link.
  - Pierre Lamothe, Le maroquin rouge [Notes sur la fratrie Reclus par leur oncle Pierre Léonce Chaucherie], n° 73, 1998, p. 22-32, link.
  - Henri Besson-Imbert, Notes de lectures [sur Pauline Kergomard par Geneviève et Alain Kergomard], n° 79, 2002, p. 63-65, link.
  - Danièle Provain, Pourquoi sommes-nous reclusiens ?, n° 84, 2004, p. 5-7, link.
  - Henri Besson-Imbert, Arbre de descendance d’Élie Reclus, n° 84, 2004, p. 2-4, link.
  - Andrée Despy-Meyer, Élie Reclus, un ethnologue et un mythologue méconnu, n° 84, 2004, p. 8-20, link.
  - Élie et Élisée Reclus, Unions libres [1882], n° 84, 2004, p. 21-37, link.
  - Danièle Provain, Notre ami Roger Gonot [et les Reclus], n° 84, 2004, p. 38-40, link.
  - Henri Besson-Imbert, Arbre d’ascendance et de descendance d’Élie Reclus, n° 85, 2005, p. 3-8, link.
  - Danièle Provain, Note de lecture [sur « La poule » d’Élie Reclus], n° 85, 2005, p. 9-10, link.
  - Danièle Provain, L’année 2005 : Élisée Reclus ?, n° 86, 2005, p. 4-5, link.
  - Philippe Pelletier, La géographie innovante d’Élisée Reclus, n° 86, 2005, p. 6-38, link.
  - Jean-Louis Claverie, Zéline Trigant de la Faniouse (1805-1887) "l’inoubliable", Jacques Reclus (1796-1882) son mari, "l’intransigeant", n° 86, 2005, p. 39-47, link.
  - Jeanne Vigouroux, Élisée Reclus et l'Algérie (1884-1905), n° 89, 2007, p. 3-15, link.
  - Danièle Provain, Michelet, les Reclus, hôtes de Vascœuil, n° 90, 2007, p. 19-27, link.
  - Zéline Faure, L’ultime larme, souvenirs de Zizou (Zéline Faure) sur son père Élie Faure [Marie-Zéline Faure, 1904-1997], n° 91, 2008, p. 27-37, link.
  - Jeanne Vigouroux, Patrick Geddes (1854-1932) [et les Reclus], n° 92, 2008, p. 7-17, link.
  - Jeanne Vigouroux, Paul Reclus, aux risques de l’anarchisme, n° 94, 2009, p. 20-34, link.
  - Jeanne Vigouroux, Élisée Reclus et les juifs, une mise au point nécessaire, n° 99, 2012, p. 21-28, link.
  - Danièle Provain, Un cas d’école : l’inspecteur Jean Reclus (1794-1869), n° 101, 2013, p. 14-18, link.
  - Jeanne Vigouroux, Jules Steeg (1836-1898), ardent défenseur de la laïcité, n° 101, 2013, p. 19-27, link.
  - Une série de Portraits :
    - Alain Morel, Jean Pierre Michel dit Élie Reclus (1827-1904), mise en ligne le 2 septembre 2014, link.
    - Jeanne Vigouroux, Élisée Reclus (1830-1905), mise en ligne le 13 mai 2010, link.
    - Alain Morel, Joseph Onésime Reclus (1837-1916), mise en ligne le 18 juillet 2014, link.
    - Alain Morel, Élie Armand Ebenhezer Reclus (1843-1927), mise en ligne le 17 juillet 2014, link.
    - Jeanne Vigouroux, Paul Reclus (1858-1941), mise en ligne le 11 mai 2010, link.
    - Danièle Provain, Jean-Louis Faure, 1863-1944, mise en ligne le 30 novembre 2010, link.
- Blasco Ibáñez, Vicente (2014). "Comentario. Una familia de geógrafos: los hermanos Reclus". Geopolítica(s). Revista de estudios sobre espacio y poder (in Spanish). 5 (2). doi:10.5209/rev_GEOP.2014.v5.n2.49173. ISSN 2172-3958.
- Brun, Christophe; Ferretti, Federico (April 2015). Elisée Reclus, une chronologie familiale : sa vie, ses voyages, ses écrits, ses ascendants, ses collatéraux, les descendants, leurs écrits, sa postérité, 1796–2015 (in French) (2nd ed.).
- Christophe Brun (éd.), Élisée Reclus, Les Grands Textes, Paris, Flammarion, coll. Champs classiques, 2014, 503 p. ISBN 9782081289901, textes systématiquement resitués dans un contexte familial notice, Philosophie Magazine.
- Gabrielle Cadier-Rey, Le Journal (imaginaire) de Zéline Reclus, Carrières-sous-Poissy, La Cause, 2009, 110 p.
- Gabrielle Cadier-Rey, Les Reclus au féminin, p. 1-15, et Robert Darrigrand, Le pasteur Jacques Reclus, p. 17-22, dans le Bulletin du Centre d’étude du protestantisme béarnais, Pau, Archives départementales des Pyrénées-Atlantiques, n° 40 « spécial Reclus », décembre 2006.
- Gabrielle Cadier-Rey et Danièle Provain (éd.), Lettres de Zéline Reclus à son fils Armand, 1867-1874, Pau, Centre d’étude du protestantisme béarnais, Archives départementales des Pyrénées-Atlantiques, 2012.
  - Faure, Jean-Claude (February 15, 2013). "La famille Reclus vit aussi à travers ses lettres". SudOuest.fr.
- Lucien Carrive (éd.), Lettres écrites par les filles du pasteur Jacques Reclus à Zoé Tuyès (Steeg), 1856-1863, dans le Bulletin de la Société d’histoire du protestantisme français, avril-juin 1997, p. 189-244, et octobre-décembre 1997, p. 663-730, notice.
- Maurice Colombo & Didier Roy (éd.), Élisée Reclus, Chelles, revue Itinéraire : une vie, une pensée 14–15, 1998, notice, pages 100-107.
- Jean Corriger & Henri Rey-Lescure, Cette étonnante famille des Reclus, dans Notre Prochain (bulletin des Asiles pour enfants de la Fondation John Bost, La Force, Dordogne), n° 171, 1967-12-01, p. 45-50, accès en ligne.
- Gary S. Dunbar & Louise Rapacka, Two French Geographers : Paul Reclus and Louis Cuisinier, dans Geographers, Biobibliographical Studies, vol. 16, Londres, Mansell, 1995, p. 88-100.
- André Janmotte & Paul Glansdorf, notice François Bouny dans la Biographie nationale publiée par l’Académie royale des Sciences, des Lettres et des Beaux-Arts de Belgique, Bruxelles, Émile Bruylant, 1981, t. 42 (supplément), p. 82a-100b, link.
- Geneviève Kergomard & Alain Kergomard (ed.), Pauline Kergomard créatrice de la maternelle moderne, correspondances privées, rapports aux ministres, Rodez, Le Fil d’Ariane, 2000.
- Michel & Jacques Reclus (ed.), Paul Reclus, Les Frères Élie et Élisée Reclus ou du protestantisme à l'anarchisme, Paris, Les Amis d'Élisée Reclus, 1964.
