= Noémi Reclus =

French militant republican and teacher (1828–1905)

Marthe Elisabeth Noémi Reclus
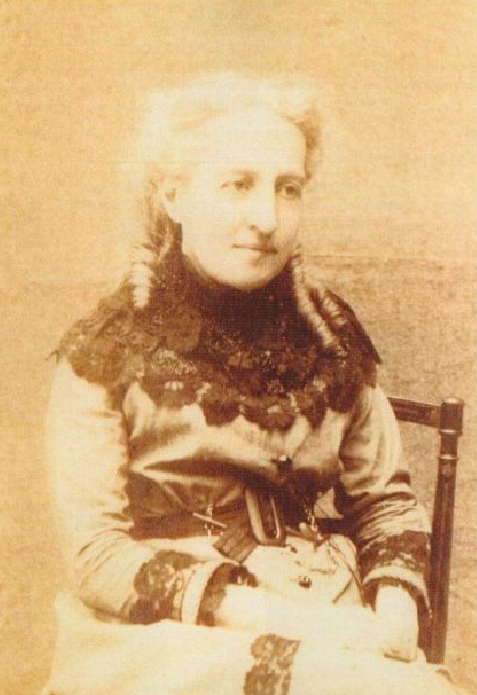
- Born: 23 March 1828; Bordeaux, France
- Died: 14 July 1905 (age 77); Brussels, Belgium
- Occupation: Teacher
- Spouse: Élie Reclus
- Children: Paul Reclus
- Relatives: Pauline Kergomard
- Family: Reclus family

Noémi Reclus (born Marthe Elisabeth Noémi Reclus) (French: [ʁəkly]; March 23, 1828 – July 14, 1905) was a French militant republican and teacher who was involved in the Paris Commune in 1871 alongside broader proto-feminist and proto-anarchist activism.

== Family ==
Noémi was born into the Reclus family, a Protestant family originating in Le Fleix, Nouvelle Aquitaine which gained notoriety for their involvement in politics, medicine, ethnography, and geography throughout the 19th and 20th centuries. Her father was Jean Reclus (1794–1859), who was the inspector of schools for Gironde, and her mother was his wife Jeanne Ducos. Her sister was Pauline Kergomard (1838–1925) who was instrumental in the development of nursery schooling in France.

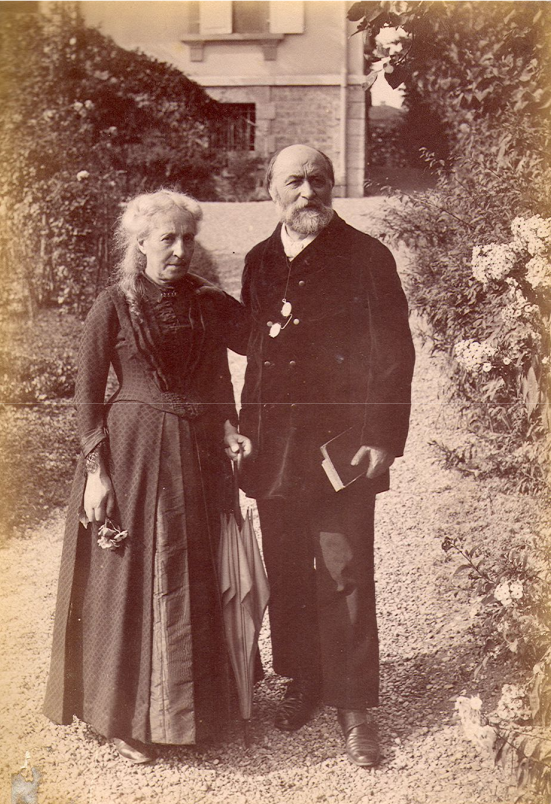
Noémi and Élie in old age

Reclus married the anarchist and ethnologist Élie Reclus (1827–1904), who was her cousin, in Bordeaux on May 30 1855. The marriage was a civil ceremony. Noémi's father, Jean, opposed her marriage to Élie and took issue with his involvement in radical politics. In November 1856, Noémi and Élie lived together at 40 boulevard de l'Etoile, in Paris. Her others cousins included Élisée Reclus, Onésime Reclus, Armand Reclus, and Paul Reclus. Her sons, by her husband Élie, were Paul Reclus (1858–1941) who was another notable anarchist, and André Reclus (1861–1936) who was a farmer first in Algeria then in Morocco. Her grandson, (son of Paul), Jacques Reclus (1894–1984) was a notable French-Chinese translator and anarchist.

== Life and political involvement ==
Although her work is often discussed in relationship to the wider activities of the Reclus family, Noémi was "an articulate activist in her own right" according to the historian Joy Harvey. During the Second French Empire, Noémi played a leading role in the development of an international militant network "in which the theme of emancipation was a major focus", in the context of a wider socialist and libertarian current. This work involved proto-feminist and proto-anarchist activism, and political engagement with both the church and state. Reclus was a friend of the French feminist writer and physician-midwife Jenny d'Héricourt (1809-1875), with whom she corresponded regularly, and the feminist activist Victoire Léodile Béra (known as André Léo).

Noémi was active in feminist clubs during the Paris Commune. Together with André Léo, Louise Michel, and the Reclus brothers, Noémi was involved in the founding of the 'Société pour la Revendication des Droits Civils de la Femme'.

In Paris, Noémi's household hosted a range of socialists, feminists, and "strangers living in Paris as a result of up heavals and wars in Russia, Poland, Italy, Spain, and the United States" alongside a range of explorers and people interested in geography. Mary Putnam Jacobi (1842-1906), the English-American physician and suffragist and first woman to graduate from an American pharmacy college, was a boarder in Noémi's household from 1869-1971. Mary Putnam Jacobi praised Noémi for running a household without servants, and described Noémi and the Reclus brothers during this time as "bright, fresh, inexhaustible intellects, hearts pure and warm-the most delicate honor, dignity and grace of character-ideas romantic and living". The household also hosted Elizabeth Garrett Anderson (1836-1917) as a boarder, an English physician and suffragist - the first woman in Britain to qualify as a surgeon and physician.

In May 1871, after the fall of the Paris Commune, while Élie had managed to return home safely Noémi and their sons (Paul and André) were "forced out of the house by neighbors-afraid that their presence there following the defeat of the Commune would jeopardize its safety" and went into hiding. Noémi spent several weeks living in cellars with her two young children while being hidden and protected by supportive neighbours. The family were supported in hiding by Edouard Huet, a professor at the Collège Sainte-Barbe who was a relative of the Republican socialist philosopher François Huet (1814-1869) with whom the family were acquainted.

Exiled from France after the commune, Noémi and her family first left for Italy before settling in Switzerland in Zurich. Élie had managed to obtain a forged passport under the name 'Ernesto Ricardo' via a police officer friend of Henri Schmahl. The family stayed in Zurich to support their eldest son Paul's education. In 1877, Noémie and Élie left Zurich for an extended visit to the United States. While in the United States, Noémie and Élie became acquainted with the Shakers at the Mount Lebanon Shaker Society in New Lebanon, New York. In October 1894, Noémie and Élie settled in Ixelles on Rue Victor Greyson - where Élie taught at the Free University until 1903. Noémie and Élie lived in Belgium until their deaths.

=== Role in education ===
During the Paris Commune, Noémi was part of the commission to organise and monitor girls' education in schools. The work which this committee undertook concerning education played a role in removing the influence of the church from schools, and supporting the hiring of secular women teachers.

In 1858–1861, Noémi Reclus taught French at a girls' boarding school in Edinburgh run by the Geddes sisters, she also went to Glasgow with the Murdoch family for whom she had previously been a tutor in Paris. Alongside André Léo, Marie David, H. Leval, G. Francolin, Noémi took part in an attempt to open a "Democratic Primary School" which aimed to center children's needs and "natural faculties" rather than imposing "preconcieved systems" - although the school never opened.

== Death ==
Noémi Reclus died on July 14, 1905 – a year after her husband and ten days after Élisée. Noémi was buried at Ixelles, where she is interred with her husband Élie and her brother-in-law Élisée.
