= Jacques Reclus (anarchist) =

French translator, journalist, and anarchist

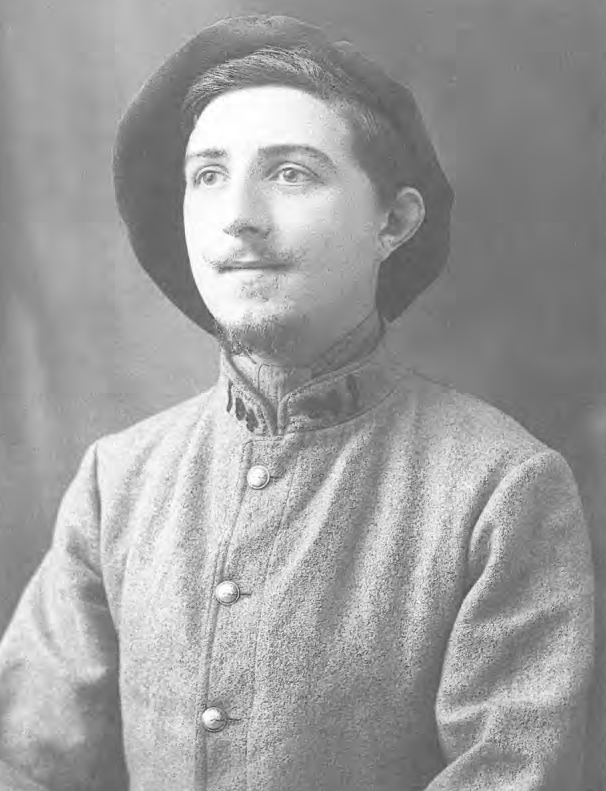
- Jacques Reclus in 1916, in the 94th Infantry Regiment.
- Born: 3 February 1894; Paris, France
- Died: 4 May 1984 (aged 90); Paris, France
- Occupations: Translator, journalist
- Parents: Paul Reclus (father); Marguerite Wapler (mother)
- Relatives: Onésime Reclus; Élie Reclus; Paul Reclus; Armand Reclus; Élisée Reclus
- Family: Reclus family

Jacques Reclus (1894–1984) was a French journalist, teacher, translator, and anarchist. As a part of the Reclus family, he was the son of Paul Reclus and Marguerite Wapler, the grandson of Élie Reclus, and the great-nephew of Élisée Reclus - each of whom were noted French anarchists.

Reclus spent his childhood in Scotland then Belgium, becoming a journalist in Paris' anarchist community in the early 1920s. He moved to China in 1927, helping to found a university inspired by the work of Peter Kropotkin. He taught French in China until 1952. In China, he married Huang Shuyi, with whom he fathered a child. He left China after the rise of the Chinese Communist Party and the persecution of foreigners, returning to France.

Reclus' work as a Chinese-French translator helped to introduce classical Chinese literature to Francophone circles. His death in 1984 was heralded by the newspaper Libération as the "end of the Recluses", referencing the Reclus family's anarchist tradition.

== Biography ==
The son of the anarchist militants Paul Reclus and Marguerite Wapler, Jacques was born in Paris on February 3, 1894. He spent part of his childhood in Scotland, where his father had gone into exile from Belgium. He returned to France in 1914 after the German invasion of Belgium.

In Belgium, Jacques studied economics and aspired to become a pianist. However, his right hand was injured during the First World War and he instead became a journalist.

He became known throughout libertarian circles in Paris through his work with several magazines, including daily contributions to The Libertarian'. By 1920, he had become the publication manager for Les Temps Nouveaux, going on to work for Plus Loin which was a continuation of Les Temps Nouveaux which he co-created in 1925 with his father Paul.

In 1922, Jacques was arrested during an anarchist protest in support of André Marty after the Black Sea mutiny. In 1923, he was involved in the creation of the Group for the Defense of Revolutionaries Imprisoned in Russia (Groupement de défense des révolutionnaires emprisonnés en Russie), and he published the pamphlet Repression of Anarchism in the Soviet Union (Répression de l’anarchisme en Union soviétique).

In 1925, Jacques stood as an anarchist election candidate in his canton - campaigning against the vote.

== Teaching in China ==
After coming into contact with Chinese anarchist students, Jacques went to China in 1927 where he became a professor of French at the newly founded National Labour University, Shanghai (which operated for five years from 1927 to 1932). The university was inspired by the works of the anarchist Peter Kropotkin. He then taught at the Central University of Nanjing in 1929. In the 1930s, he went to the Franco-Chinese University in Beijing. He wrote a textbook which he published in 1936, and which was subsequently used by educators in China.

In the summer of 1939, after the end of the Second Sino-Japanese War, Jacques went to teach at Yunnan University in Kunming. As the Second World War began, he moved to French Indochina where his home became a meeting place for Free France, as the region was then controlled by the vichy government. In 1940, his partner Huang Shuyi gave birth to their child Magali. Jacques and Huang Shuyi married in 1947, before divorcing in 1951 and eventually remarrying in 1982.

After the end of the Second World War, Jacques returned to Beijing - teaching there until 1952. He then had to leave the country following persecution by the Chinese Communist Party. His daughter, Magali, remained in China and was taken care of by an aunt. In 1979, Magali rejoined her parents in Paris.

== Translator in Paris ==
In France, Huang Shuyi became a language teacher. Jacques struggled to return to teaching, instead he became a proofreader and then editor at the Revue bibliographique de sinologie. In 1968 he resumed teaching, giving a course on Chinese literary translation at Paris-vii University. Jacques produced and directed the translations of multiple classical Chinese texts in French.

Although he continued to work with the anarchist periodical Plus Loin from China, his political activity declined from the 1960s. Jacques continued to write articles for Cahiers de l'humanisme libertaire, and published a book about Élie Reclus (his grandfather) and Élisée Reclus (his great-uncle).

Jacques continued to work as a translator until his death in 1984.

== Selected publications ==
=== As author or editor ===
- Jacques Reclus, Cours de français élémentaire : grammaire, lecture, conversation, vocabulaire, pronunciation, exercices, Shanghai, La Presse commerciale, 1936
- Michel et Jacques Reclus, Les Frères Elie et Elisée Reclus ou du protestantisme à l’anarchisme, Paris, Les Amis d’Elisée Reclus, 1964, 209 p. Il s'agit de la compilation par Michel et Jacques Reclus de textes de leur père Paul et de leur oncle Élisée Reclus.
- Jacques Reclus, La Révolte des Taï-ping, 1851–1864, prologue de la révolution chinoise, Paris, Le Pavillon, 1972.

=== As translator ===
- Edgar Snow, Étoile rouge sur la Chine, Paris, Stock, 1965.
- Shen Fu (Chen Fou), Récits d'une vie fugitive, mémoires d'un lettré pauvre, Paris, Gallimard, 1968.
- Fong Mong-Long, Le Vendeur d’huile qui seul possède la reine de beauté, Paris, Centre de publication Asie orientale/Université Paris VII, 1977.
- Wou Wo-Yao, Crime et corruption chez les mandarins, chronique de la Chine impériale, Paris, Fayard, 1979.
- Michael B. Frolic, Le Peuple de Mao, scènes de la vie en Chine révolutionnaire, Paris, Gallimard, 1982.
- Tchen Ki-ying, L’Innocent du Village-aux-Roseaux, chronique de Roisel en Chine du Nord, Paris, Aubier-Montaigne, 1984.
