= Paul Reclus =

Paul Reclus may refer to:

- Paul Reclus (anarchist) (1858–1941), French anarchist
- Paul Reclus (surgeon) (1847–1914), French physician specializing in surgery
