= Jacques Reclus =

French clergyman (1796–1882)

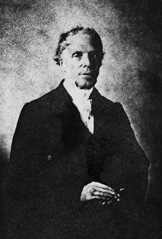
Jacques Reclus (1796-1882)

Jacques Reclus (27 July 1796 – 8 April 1882) was a French Protestant minister.

== Life ==
Following studies in Bordeaux, he worked as a librarian at Château de Bonzac, home of Elie Decazes (1780-1860), minister of Louis XVIII. From 1819 he studied theology in Montauban, becoming ordained as pastor at Nimes in December 1821. Afterwards he served as a minister in La Roche-Chalais (1822), then Montcaret (1824). He became the president of the Consistoire de Montcaret (Dordogne).

Reclus taught ancient languages at the Protestant college in Sainte-Foy-la-Grande.

In June 1831 he resigned as pastor and instructor at the Protestant college in Sainte-Foy-la-Grande in order to head an independent evangelical community in Castétarbe. In 1850 he founded a home for the aged in Orthez.

== Family ==
Reclus was the father of fourteen children who survived beyond infancy, including five sons who gained distinction during their careers.

- Élie Reclus (1827-1904), journalist and political activist
- Élisée Reclus (1830-1905), geographer and political activist
- Onésime Reclus (1837-1916), geographer
- Armand Reclus (1843-1927), geographer and explorer
- Paul Reclus (1847-1914), surgeon

== Publications ==
- Scènes d’une pauvre vie; Pau 1858.
