= Château de la Valouze =

- Interactive map of the Château de la Valouze area

General information
- Type: Château
- Location: La Roche-Chalais, France
- Coordinates: 45.141628°N 0.004461°E

Website
- www.chateaudelavalouze.com

The Château de la Valouze is a château in the town of La Roche-Chalais, Dordogne, Nouvelle-Aquitaine, France, 17 km north of Saint-Seurin-sur-l'Isle, near the city Bordeaux. It was built for Baron Gustave Arlot de Saint-Saud, the baron of the land, and formerly belonged to the family of art gallery owners of Paul Durand-Ruel. The vast estate of the castle consists of sprawling lawns and woods that contain cypress trees, ginkgo, eucalyptus and oaks. The eastern facade has a front central body housing the front door as well as two lateral semicircular bay. The style is overall more neoclassical and the third level is built into the attic. The castle is of noble craftsmanship, its exterior decoration is sober but the details elegant. It is surrounded by a park of more than 30 hectares including exotic species (cypress, ginkgo biloba, eucalyptus) but also oaks and pines. The castle now hosts receptions, weddings, guest rooms (Chambres d´Hotes), social events and seminars.
