= Duplay =

Duplay is a surname. Notable people with the surname include:

- Éléonore Duplay (1768–1832), French painter
- Maurice Duplay (1736–1820), French carpentry contractor and revolutionary in the French Revolution
- Simon-Emmanuel Duplay (1836–1924), French surgeon
