= Ivan Pranishnikoff =

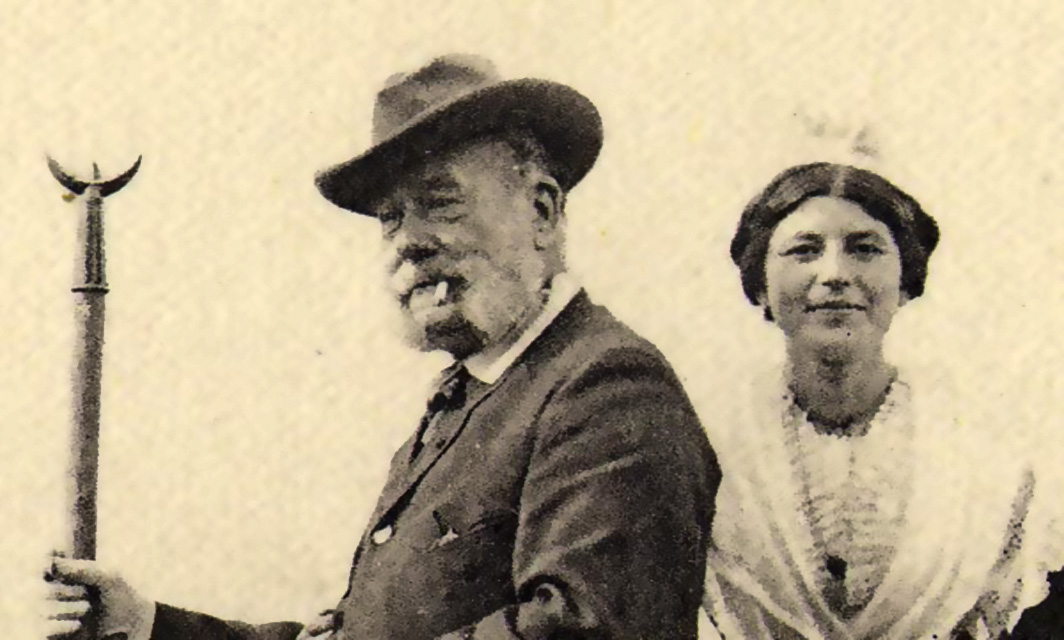
- Born: 3 May 1841; Saint Petersburg
- Died: 16 April 1909 (aged 67); Saintes-Maries-de-la-Mer
- Occupation: Painter, illustrator, historian, watercolorist, drawer

Ivan Petrovich Pranishnikoff (May 3, 1841, Kursk region - April 16, 1909, Saintes-Maries-de-la-Mer) was a Russian painter, illustrator, archaeological prospector, and traveler. Pranishnikoff's work is featured extensively in La Nouvelle Géographie universelle, a 19-volume collection of geographical writing by Élisée Reclus. At the end of his life he moved to Saintes-Maries-de-la-Mer in the Camargue, where he died.
