= La Nouvelle Géographie universelle =

19-volume work of world geography by Élisée Relcus, published 1876 – 1894

La Nouvelle Géographie universelle, la terre et les hommes
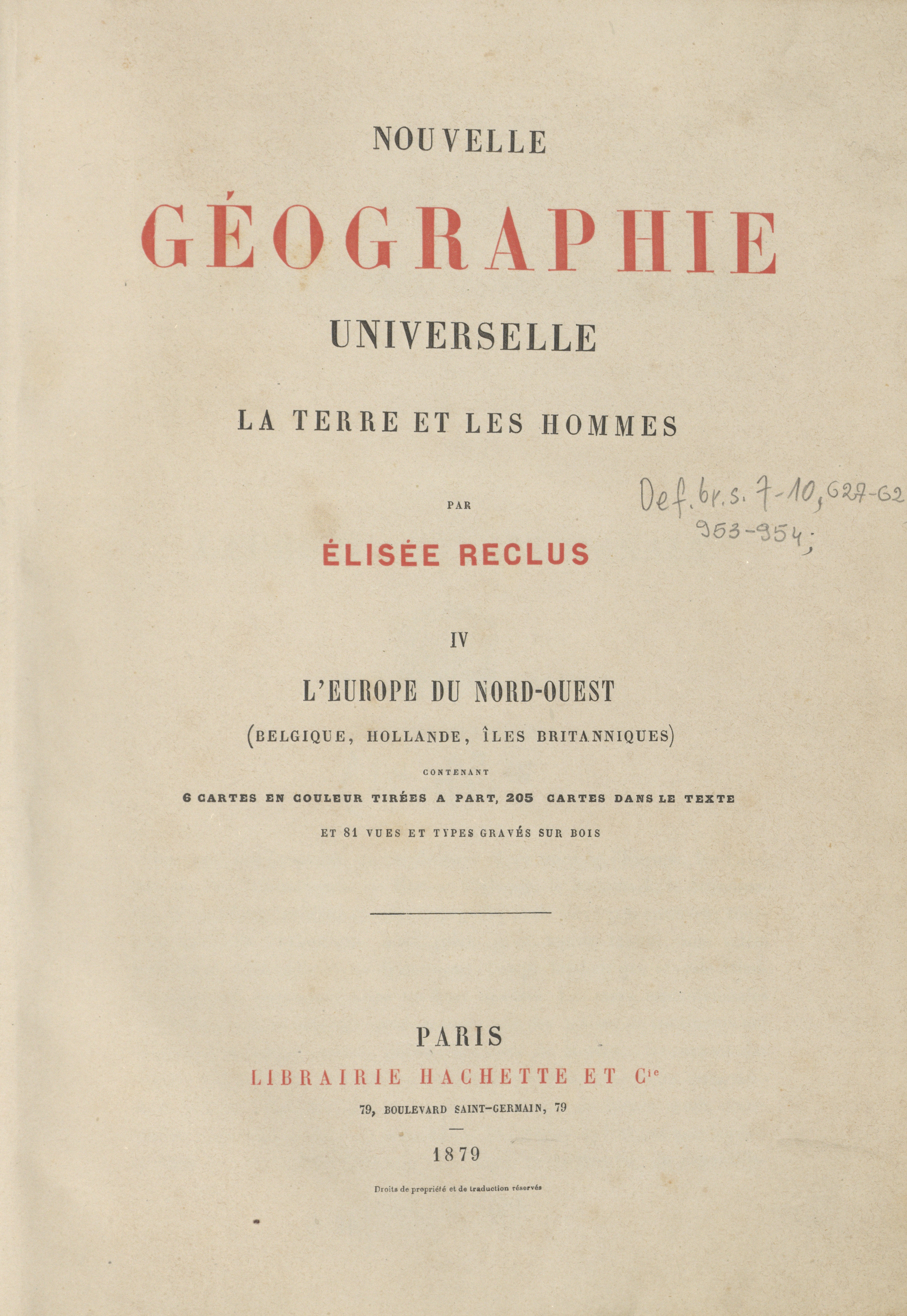
- Author: Élisée Reclus
- Subject: World geography
- Published: 1876-1894 (Hachette)
- Pages: 17,873

La Nouvelle Géographie universelle, la terre et les hommes is a 19-volume collection of geographical writings produced by Élisée Reclus (1830 – 1905), a French anarchist and geographer. The Nouvelle Géographie universelle was produced between 1875 and 1894, and published by Hachette. The collection represents Reclus' major work and a landmark moment in geographical writing. Its publication garnered recognition for Reclus' work as a geographer. In 1892, the Paris Geographical Society awarded Reclus with its Gold Medal as recognition for the collection, this was despite Reclus living in exile at the time.

== Production ==
In February 1872, Élisée joined his brother Élie Reclus in exile in Switzerland. Early in his exile, Élisée submitted a 14-page "Plan for a Descriptive Geography" to Émile Templier, a senior figure at Hachette. This plan would go on to become the Nouvelle Geographie universelle. Templier accepted Reclus' plan, with the two signing a contract for production of the text in 1872. This contract stipulated that although it was not to be a political work, it would not be censored. At the time Hachette was "the first systematic producer of geographical knowledge" as French universities had yet to institutionalise geography. Reclus directed the production of the collection from Clarens, Switzerland where he lived in exile.

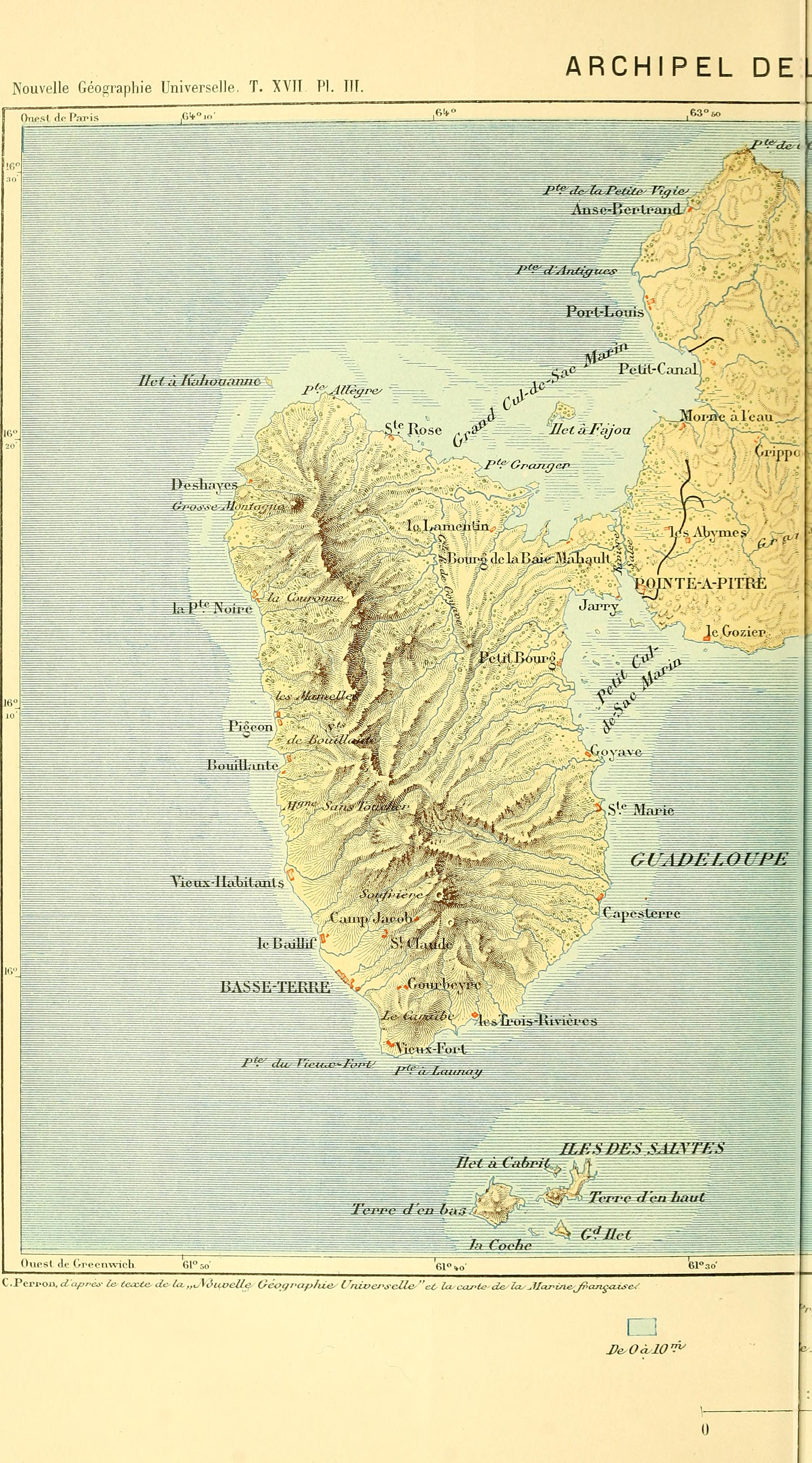
Map showing Guadalupe, from the Nouvelle Géographie universelle.

Reclus had many supporters within Hachette. Two of his brothers, Élie and Onésime Reclus, worked at Hachette during the production of the Nouvelle Geographie universelle, as did his Reclus' cousin Franz Schrader. Other associates of Reclus who worked with Hachette included the Swiss anarchist James Guillaume. Hachette was, in Federico Ferretti's assessment, "populated by Reclus' friends, relatives and political fellows" with the period between 1860 – 1910 being characterised by a substantial anarchist and radical involvement with geographical publishing at Hachette. Reclus was afforded 300 francs a month to support the production of the Nouvelle Geographie universelle, this money provided "mutual aid towards other anarchist exiles or activists who were in difficult personal and professional situations" as he used it to support a team of collaborators in the production of the volumes.

=== Translation ===
The first four volumes were translated into English by Ernst Georg Ravenstein (a German-English cartographer and migration theorist), the remaining volumes were then translated by Augustus Henry Keane (an Irish journalist and ethnologist).

=== Maps ===
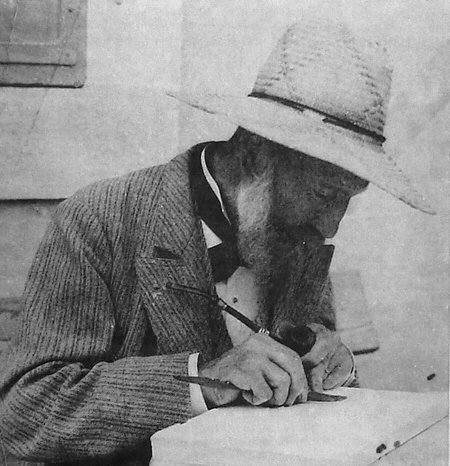
Charles Perron at work

The majority of the maps in the Nouvelle Géographie universelle were produced by Charles Perron, a French cartographer with whom Reclus had previously collaborated. Reclus was closely involved with the mapmaking process and included his comments on drafts of the prepared maps.

== Conclusion ==
In a section titled "A Parting Word" at the introduction to the nineteenth volume, Reclus thanked the "devoted fellow-workers who have constantly aided me by their researches and advice" and reflected that many had died by the time of the final volume's publication. Reclus wrote that his earlier work, The Earth: a descriptive history of the physical phenomena of the life of our globe, figures as "a sort of introduction to the series of volumes which I now bring to a close". Reclus suggested a need for another short text to be written to "justify the long series of books now ended without apparent conclusion".

Reflecting on the role of the geographer, Reclus wrote in the introduction to this final volume: "The man who searchingly surveys this universe, assists at the vast work of incessant creation, always beginning, never ending, and himself sharing by the largeness of his grasp in the eternity of things, he may, like Newton, like Darwin, find the word that sums all up".

Closing out the collection in the final paragraph of vol. 19, Reclus turns to then as yet unexplored Antarctica as the next frontier in geography: "Farther south towards the antarctic pole, the southern seas, with their convoys of huge icebergs, sweep round the planetary surface, awaiting the future Scoresbys and Nansens, who are to lift the veil now concealing the mysteries of those unexplored solitudes."

== Reception ==
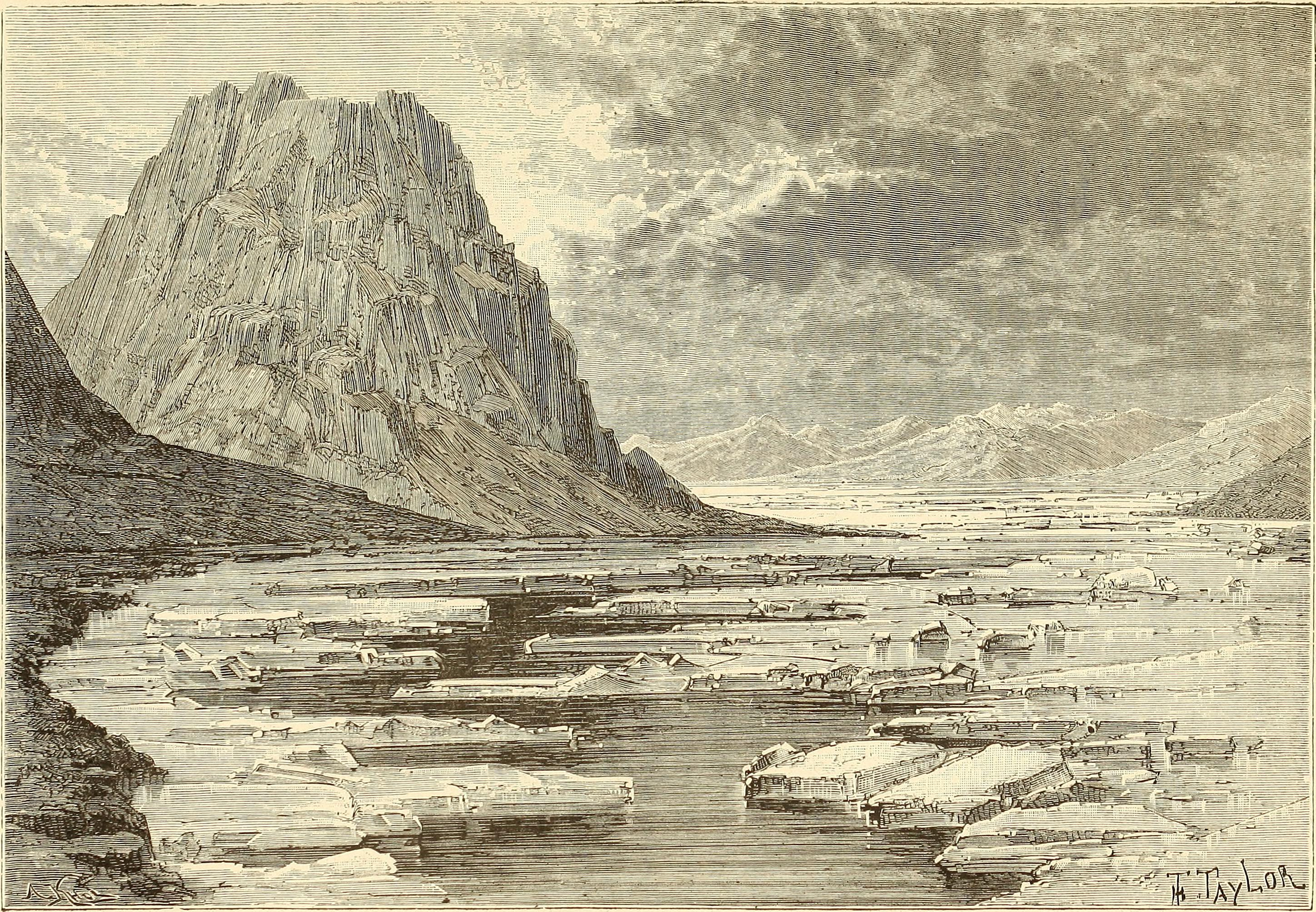
An illustration from the Nouvelle Géographie universelle

An 1894 review by Halford Mackinder, appearing in the Royal Geographical Society's The Geographical Journal, described the Nouvelle Géographie universelle as "a great achievement". Mackinder praised the work as having a "clearplan, a lucid style, an unprejudiced view, and, in many places, philosophic thought". Mackinder suggested that where there are errors, they are "rarely of radical importance".

In 1976, Yves Lacoste reflected that Reclus demonstrated a broad conception of geography, and described him as 'a great geographer, and a great thinker' ("un grand géographe et un grand penseur").

Alain Gascon commented that Relcus "never visited Africa during his wandering life" and based his interpretation on the stories of travellers and scientists. However, Gascon noted "very few factual mistakes" in Relcus' descriptions of Africa. He praised Reclus' description of Ethiopia, writing that "he had the wisdom not to embark himself on the racialist-linguistic fantasies of his contemporaries who only had colonization in mind".

Ronald Creagh suggested that Reclus' geography takes a broadly naturalist argument which draws connections, although in his summation, Reclus' work aims "to banish all simplifications".

Philippe Pelletier argued that Reclus' description of Japan was "tainted by an almost naive Eurocentrism". Pelletier highlighted that Reclus' approach "praises the psychological and moral virtues of the Japanese" much like his other European contemporaries. Pelletier otherwise suggested that Relcus saw that "independence, political and religious freedom are the guarantees of progress" in Japan just as much as elsewhere in the world.

Gary S. Dunbar, then professor of geography at UCLA, described the collection as "one of the greatest individual writing feats in the history of geography".

== Volumes ==
The English titles of the 19 volumes are as follows:

- vol.1: Southern Europe (Greece, Turkey in Europe, Rumania, Servia, Italy, Spain and Portugal).
- vol.2: France and Switzerland.
- vol.3: Austria-Hungary, Germany, Belgium, and the Netherlands.
- vol.4: The British Isles.
- vol.5: The northeast Atlantic. Islands of the North Atlantic, Scandinavia, European islands of the Arctic Ocean, Russia in Europe.
- vol.6: Asiatic Russia.
- vol.7: East Asia.
- vol.8: India and Indo-China.
- vol.9: South-western Asia.
- vol.10: North-east Africa.
- vol.11: North-west Africa.
- vol.12: West Africa.
- vol.13: South and East Africa.
- vol.14: Australasia.
- vol.15: North America.
- vol.16: The United States.
- vol.17: Mexico, Central America, West Indies.
- vol.18: South America: The Andes regions.
- vol.19: Amazonia and La Plata.

== Notable contributors ==
Although Reclus was primarily responsible for the development and writing of La Nouvelle Géographie universelle, the overall production involved other contributors who played various roles. Notable among these contributors were:

- Mykhailo Drahomanov (1841–1895), a Ukrainian academic and radical.
- Luigi Galleani (1861–1931), an Italian insurrectionary anarchist.
- Pyotr Kropotkin (1842–1921), a Russian anarchist and geographer.
- Gustave Lefrançais (1826–1901), a French teacher and journalist.
- Lev Mechnikov (1838–1888), a Swiss-Russian geographer, sociologist, and anarchist theorist.
  - Nadine Kontchewski (1856–1925), a Russian translator and Metchnikoff's stepdaughter.
  - Leonid Chichko, Nadine Kontchewski's husband.
- Charles Perron (1837–1909), a cartographer and anarchist.
- Ivan Pranishnikoff (1841–1909), a Russian painter, illustrator, archaeological prospector, and traveler.
- Étienne Antoine Eugène Ronjat (1822–1912), a French artist.
- Henri Sensine (1854–1937), a French writer and grammarian who worked as Reclus' secretary.
- André Slomszynski (1844–1909), a French-Polish painter, engraver, illustrator, and cartographer. Also, a participant in the Paris Commune.
