= Paul Reclus (anarchist) =

French anarchist (1858–1941)

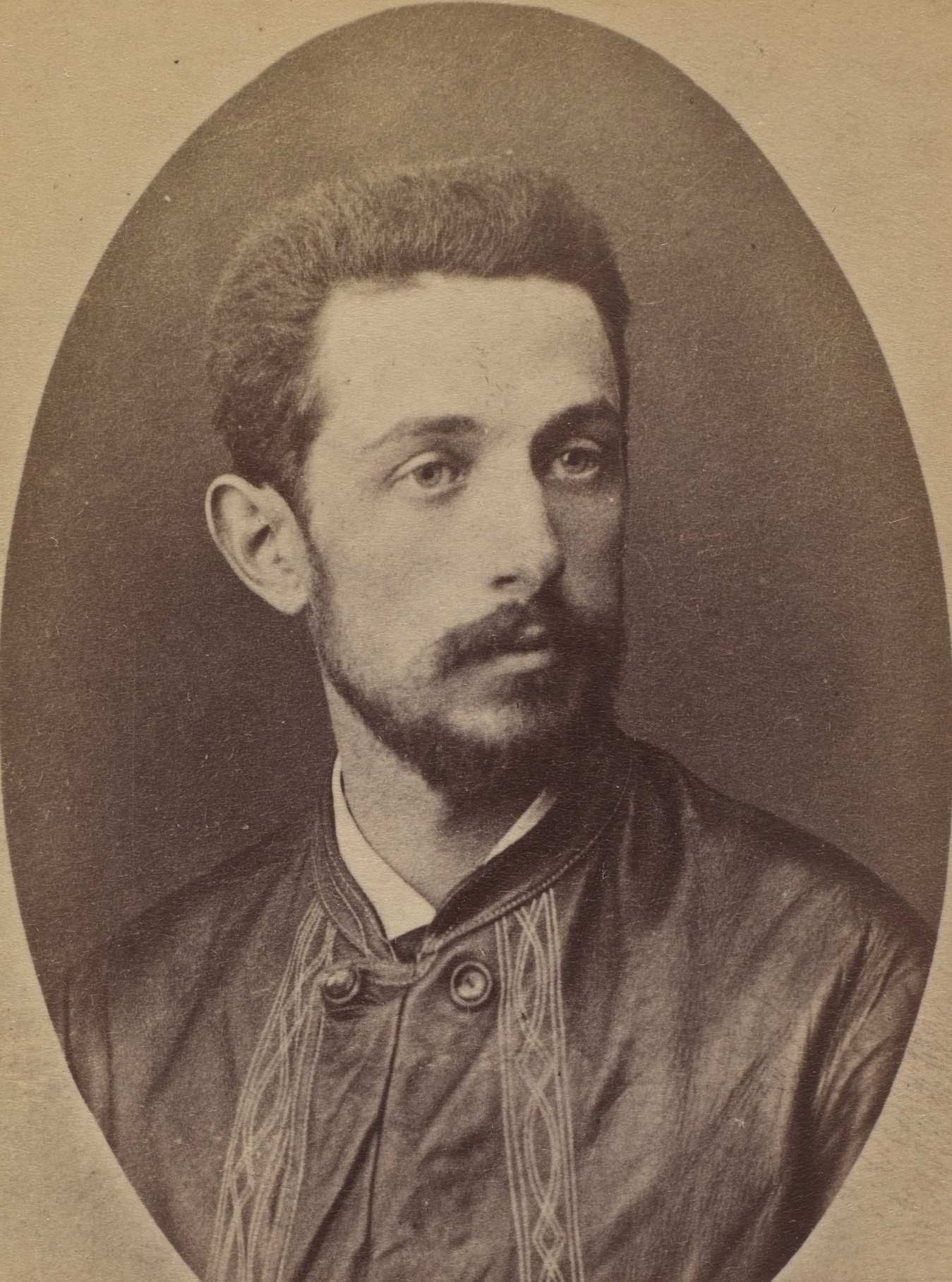
- Police mugshot of Reclus taken by Alphonse Bertillon, 1893
- Born: May 25, 1858; Neuilly-sur-Seine, France
- Died: January 19, 1941 (aged 82); Montpellier, France
- Other name: Georges Guyon
- Occupations: Engineer, teacher
- Spouse: Marguerite Wapler (m. 1885–1927)
- Children: Jacques Reclus
- Parents: Élie Reclus (father); Noémi Reclus (mother)
- Family: Reclus family

Paul Reclus (25 May 1858 – 19 January 1941) was a French anarchist.

== Early life ==
Paul Reclus was born on 25 May 1858, in Neuilly-sur-Seine to Noémi Reclus and Élie Reclus. Following the Paris Commune, as a young teenager, he and his parents moved to Zurich, where he remained for six years. Reclus attended École Centrale Paris between 1878 and 1881, and worked as an engineer for the next 13 years. In 1885, he married Marguerite Wapler (1859-1927), who bore the couple four children, including the anarchist Jacques Reclus.

== Career ==
Reclus wrote syndicalist propaganda while an engineer at the Gare de Bessèges, from which he was fired in 1886. He formed an anarchist group and about 30 people in the Alès area (southern France) participated. Reclus attended the 1889 International Anarchist Congress in Paris, where he advocated for individual reclamation as an expression of propaganda by deed. He later wrote that theft and work greatly overlapped, that presently, work was not honest and theft was not dishonest.

He wrote for anarchist publications including La Plume, La Revue anarchiste, and La Revue libertaire. Reclus wrote Jean Grave's Revolt for half a year during the latter's prison sentence. Reclus also managed two subscription funds, for a press and for families of prisoners.

Reclus came to manage a new factory at Varangéville in 1892 but quit when anarchists he had hired, including Désiré Pauwels, were fired. His family returned to Paris.

The anarchist Auguste Vaillant borrowed money from Reclus's wife and wrote a letter to Reclus outlining his bombing plot. Reclus, in the aftermath, fled Paris after being arrested in suspect of helping Vaillant with chemicals. He subsequently left France altogether after being indicted in the Trial of the Thirty. He assumed the pseudonym Georges Guyon, a modification of a friend's name from whom Reclus borrowed legal documentation. Reclus lived in Britain for nine years and met Kropotkin, Malatesta, and Tcherkesoff in London. Meanwhile in France in 1894, Reclus was tried in absentia and received the default sentence of 20 years' hard labor.

Reclus and his family continued to Scotland in 1896, where he would work with the anarchist geographer Patrick Geddes, who ran the Edinburgh Outlook Tower museum of human geography. Reclus taught at Peebles High School near Edinburgh for a year in 1898. They moved to a suburb of Brussels to assist Reclus's uncle, Élisée Reclus, in publishing Man and the Earth. After Élisée's death in 1905, Paul Reclus continued his uncle's work. Reclus taught at the French Lycée in Brussels three years later. He received clearance to return to France from Georges Clemenceau and visited Paris repeatedly. Reclus was forced out of his Brussels school in 1913 after taking students to visit Kropotkin. He moved to France in 1914, and during World War I, he wrote in La Bataille, La Feuille, Jean Grave's Bulletin des Temps nouveaux, and signed the Manifesto of the Sixteen.

He moved to Domme, Dordogne, where he set up a museum. He spent the remainder of his life writing scientific biography, teaching at the Montpellier College of Scots, and writing anarchist propaganda. He advocated for libertarian communism and participated in the French contingent of Solidarité internationale antifasciste (SIA) in the late 30s.

Reclus died on 19 January 1941, in Montpellier.
