= Édouard Grimard =

French naturalist

Jean-Pierre Édouard Grimard (17 April 1827 – 24 March 1909) was a French writer, educator, and botanist.

== Biography ==
Édouard Grimard was born in Lacépède (Lot-et-Garonne) on April 17, 1827. He was a close friend of the brothers Élisée Reclus and Élie Reclus. While studying at Montauban, Grimard lived with the Reclus brothers in a shared house four kilometers outside of the town and the three pursued independent studies there. On one occasion in 1849, Edouard, Élisée, and Élie walked from Montauban to the Mediterranean Sea without taking authorised leave from the school - leading, in part, to the expulsion of the Reclus brothers from the school.

In 1851, he defended his thesis in theology at the Faculty of Protestant Theology of Strasbourg at the same time as Élie Reclus. His thesis was titled: "Man in the face of god, or on human individualiality". He received the degree of bachelor of theology. His thesis was titled: "Man in the face of god, or on human individualiality".

Grimard was recorded as a witness to the birth of Élisée Reclus's first daughter on June 12, 1860, in Paris.

Grimard taught at the Protestant College of Sainte-Foy-la-Grande from 1871 until 1881. In 1874, Grimard became a municipal councilor in Pineuilh. Grimard was then the director for the école normale at Toulouse from 1881 to 1896.

Grimard wrote in journals including the Revue des Deux Mondes and the Magasin d'éducation et de récréation, publishing numerous works on botany. The writer Jules Verne used Grimard's work The Plant to discuss Australian flora as part of his novel In Search of the Castaways.
