= Victoire Léodile Béra =

French writer, feminist, and communard (1824–1900)

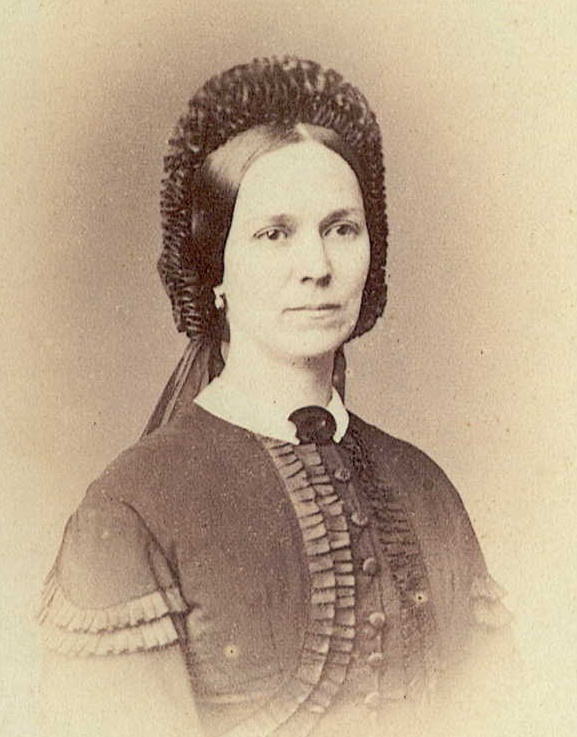
André Léo

Victoire Léodile Béra (18 August 1824 – 20 May 1900) was a French novelist, journalist and feminist. She took the name of André Léo, her two twin sons' names.

In 1866 a feminist group called the Société pour la Revendication du Droit des Femmes began to meet at the house of André Léo in Paris. Members included Paule Minck, Louise Michel, Eliska Vincent, Élie Reclus and his wife Noémi Reclus, Mme Jules Simon and Caroline de Barrau. Maria Deraismes also participated. Because of the broad range of opinions, the group decided to focus on the subject of improving girls' education.

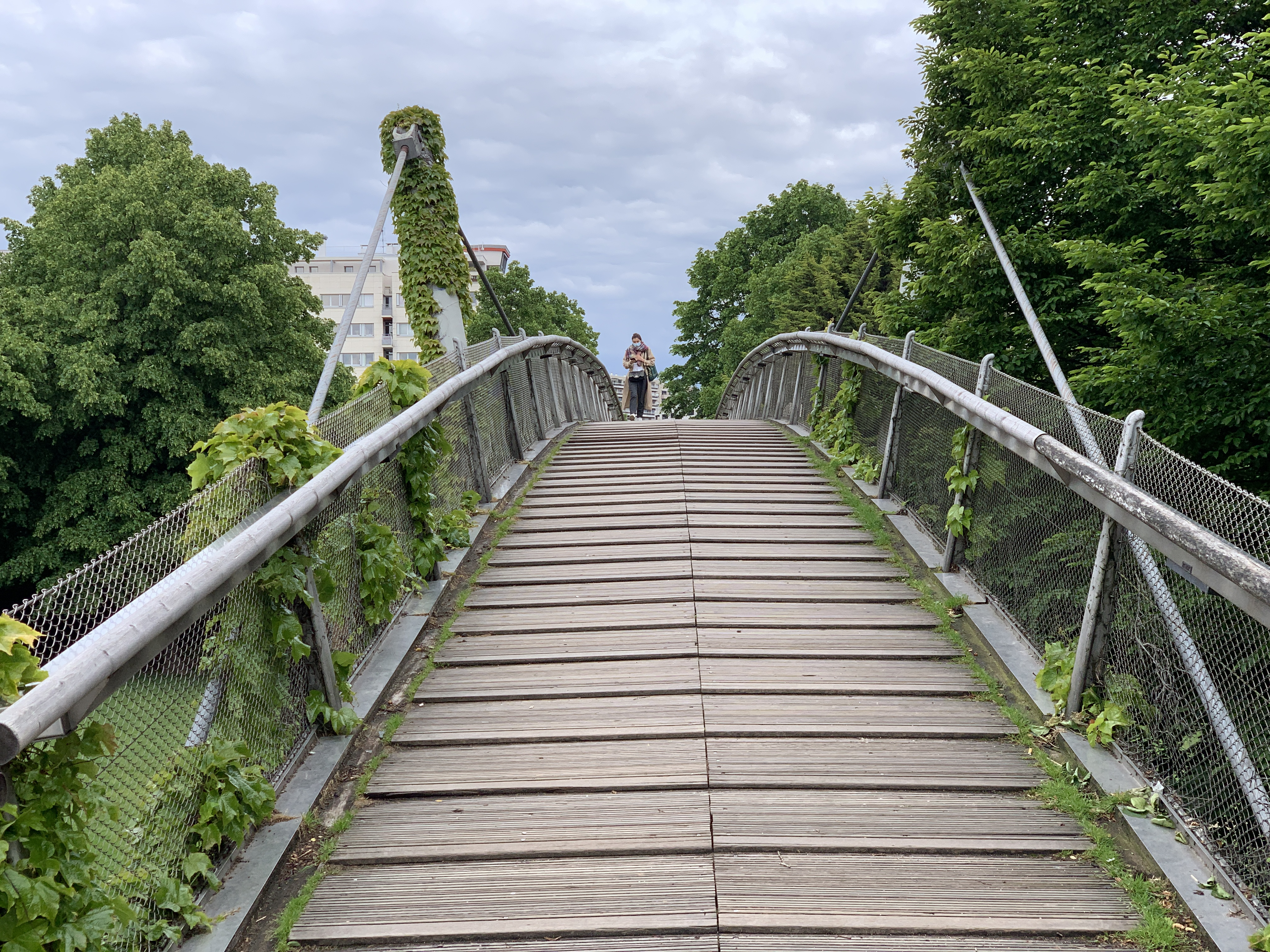
The Passerelle André Léo in Paris

== Sources ==
- McMillan, James F. (2002-01-08). France and Women, 1789-1914: Gender, Society and Politics. Routledge. ISBN 978-1-134-58957-9.
