= The Geography of Freedom =

1979 biography by Marie Fleming

- Author: Marie Fleming
- Subject: Biography
- Publisher: Rowman and Littlefield
- Publication date: 1979
- Pages: 299

The Geography of Freedom: The Odyssey of Élisée Reclus, originally published as The Anarchist Way to Socialism in 1979, is a biography of Élisée Reclus by Marie Fleming.

== Bibliography ==
- Cahm, J. C. (1980). "Review of Élisée Reclus: Historian of Nature; The Anarchist Way to Socialism: Élisée Reclus and Nineteenth-Century European Anarchism". History. 65 (213): 147–148. ISSN 0018-2648. JSTOR 24419316.
- Clark, John (1996). "Rev. of The Geography of Freedom. The Odyssey of Élisée Reclus". Social Anarchism (22): 57–65.
- Hulse, James W. (1980). "Review of The Anarchist Way to Socialism: Elisée Reclus and Nineteenth-Century European Anarchism". The American Historical Review. 85 (4): 900. doi:10.2307/1868940. ISSN 0002-8762. JSTOR 1868940.
- Novak, Derry (1980). "Review of The Anarchist Way to Socialism: Elisée Reclus and Nineteenth-Century European Anarchism". Canadian Journal of Political Science. 13 (2): 416–417. doi:10.1017/S0008423900033266. ISSN 0008-4239. JSTOR 3229747. S2CID 154222023.
- Prevost, Gary (1980). "Review of The Anarchist Way to Socialism: Elisee Reclus and Nineteenth-Century European Anarchism". The American Political Science Review. 74 (2): 474–475. doi:10.2307/1960650. ISSN 0003-0554. JSTOR 1960650. S2CID 146939155.
- Taylor, Peter (1991). "Review of The Geography of Freedom. The Odyssey of Élisée Reclus". Urban Studies. 28 (4): 658–660. doi:10.1080/00420989120080811. ISSN 0042-0980. JSTOR 43195816. S2CID 132363148.
