= Marguerite Wapler =

French anarchist (1859-1927)

- Born: 14 July 1859; Alexandria
- Died: 1927 (aged 67–68)
- Occupation: Anarchist
- Spouse(s): Paul Reclus
- Children: Jacques Reclus

Marguerite Wapler or Marguerite Reclus (1859–1927), was a French anarchist activist. The daughter of a sub-prefect and wealthy industrialist, Wapler became involved in anarchist militancy. During the Ère des attentats (1892–1894), she supported the National Assembly bombing by funding Auguste Vaillant to help him prepare and carry out his attack. She faced accusations and was raided during the repression of January and February 1894, but Vaillant, in his final statements, absolved her of any involvement in the plot.

== Biography ==
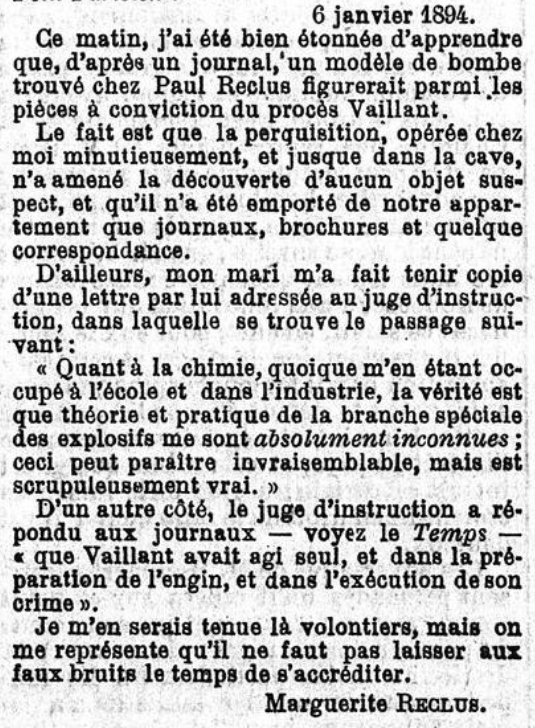
Answer of Marguerite Wapler to accusations saying that she would have the model of the bomb used by Vaillant. Le Siècle, 8 January 1894.

Catherine Marguerite Wapler was born on 14 July 1859, in Alexandria, Egypt. Her father, Alphonse Wapler (1831–1890), was a wealthy industrialist from Alsace, former mayor of Vassy, and sub-prefect of the town from 1880 until his death. On 17 October 1885, Wapler married anarchist activist Paul Reclus, of the Reclus family, at the town hall of the 5th arrondissement of Paris.

During the Ère des attentats (1892–1894), she was one of two patrons of the National Assembly bombing. Alongside an illegalist anarchist, she gave twenty francs to Auguste Vaillant to carry out his attack. During his trial, Vaillant tried to clear her of involvement in the bombing, claiming that the funds she provided were due to her generosity and desire to support his family financially.

Wapler was also targeted during the repression of January and February 1894, and her home was raided. This led her to respond to accusations that police had found plans for the bomb used by Vaillant during the attack.

On 31 December 1914, she dined with her husband and Pauline Kergomard. Wapler was the mother of two daughters who died in infancy—the last one in 1890—and two sons: Jacques Reclus and Michel Reclus (1889–1970).

She died in 1927.

== Bibliography ==
- Brun, Christophe (2014). Elisée Reclus, une chronologie familiale : sa vie, ses voyages, ses écrits, ses ascendants, ses collatéraux, les descendants, leurs écrits, sa postérité [Elisée Reclus, a family timeline: his life, his travels, his writings, his ascendants, his collaterals, the descendants, their writings, his posterity] (in French). H.A.L.
- Maitron, Jean (1955), Histoire du mouvement anarchiste en France (1800-1914) (in French), Paris: Histoire du mouvement anarchiste en France, 1880-1914
