= Élie Reclus =

French ethnologist and anarchist (1827–1904)

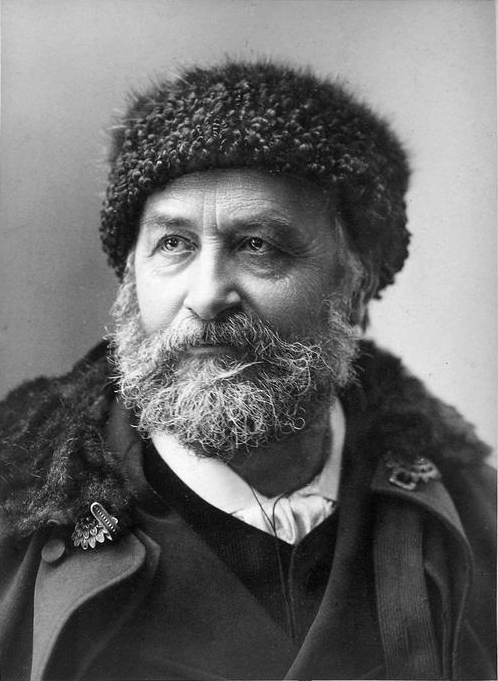
- Portrait by Nadar
- Born: 11 July 1827; Sainte-Foy-la-Grande, France
- Died: 11 February 1904 (age 77); Brussels, Belgium
- Occupation: Ethnographer
- Spouse: Noémi Reclus
- Children: Paul Reclus
- Parent(s): Jacques Reclus, Marguerite Zéline Trigant
- Relatives: Onésime Reclus; Élisée Reclus; Paul Reclus; Jacques Reclus; Armand Reclus
- Family: Reclus family

Élie Reclus (French: [ʁəkly]; July 16, 1827 – February 11, 1904) was a French ethnographer and anarchist.

== Biography ==
Élie Reclus was the oldest child among five brothers and six sisters. His father was Jacques Reclus, a Protestant minister in Montcaret, and his mother was Marguerite Zéline Trigant, a teacher who founded a school at Orthez. His middle three brothers, including the well known anarchist Élisée Reclus, all became geographers.

Élie and his brother Élisée were close friends with the botanist Édouard Grimard, living together while they studied theology at Montauban. Élisée and Élie were expelled from the school at Montauban for their socialist politics, and after taking unauthorised leave to walk to the Mediterranean with Édouard.

On May 30th in 1855, Élie married Noémie (1825-1905), his first cousin, and settled in Ternes. Élie then took a job working in the litigation office of a bank.

In 1866 a feminist group called the Société pour la Revendication du Droit des Femmes began to meet at the house of André Léo. Members included Paule Minck, Louise Michel, Eliska Vincent, Élie Reclus and his wife Noémie, Mme Jules Simon and Caroline de Barrau. Maria Deraismes also participated. Because of the broad range of opinions, the group decided to focus on the subject of improving girls' education.

Élie Reclus served as director of the Bibliotheque National in Paris during the Commune de Paris. Condemned par contumace, he went to the United States, then to England, until the French government amnesty in March 1879. While exiled in London, he presented to the Royal Anthropological Institute of Great Britain and Ireland his first article against circumcision, Circumcision, signification, origins and other similar rituals, in January 1879.

Reclus also taught Charles Fairfield, who was the father of Rebecca West.

Reclus died at 5 in the morning on February 11, 1904 at his home on rue Victor-Greyson in Ixelles. He had been suffering with the flu. At his deathbed were his wife Noémi, his son Paul, his daughter-in-law Marguerite, his brother Elisée, his sisters Noémi Reclus and Louise Reclus, his cousin Pauline Reclus, and his nephew Elie Faure. Reclus was buried at Ixelles, his brother Élisée and wife Noémie were later interred in the same burial plot.

== Works ==
- Many articles in French or foreign journals or magazines, among which:
  - Revue de l’Ouest, Bay Saint-Louis (United States)
  - Mysl, then Dielo, Saint-Petersburg
  - Rousskoïé Slovo
  - The Times
  - Putnam’s Magazine,
  - International, San Francisco)
  - La Gironde (« Lettres d’un cosmopolite »)
  - La Rive gauche
  - La Nouvelle Revue,
  - Revue de la Société d’anthropologie
  - La Commune
- 1864: Introduction to the Dictionnaire des communes de France, in collaboration with Élisée Reclus, Hachette
- 1885: Les Primitifs, Chamerot.
- 1894: Les Primitifs d’Australie, Dentu.
- 1896: Renouveau d’une cité, in collaboration with Élisée Reclus, La Société nouvelle
- 1894–1904: conferences at the New University of Brussels on the evolution of religions
- 1904–1910, posthumes:
  - Le Mariage tel qu’il fut et tel qu’il est, Imprimerie nouvelle, Mons
  - La Commune de Paris au jour le jour, Schleicher, reedited in 2011 by the Association Théolib;
  - Les Croyances populaires, lessons at the New University
  - Le Pain. La Doctrine de Luther, la Société nouvelle
  - Les Physionomies végétales, Costes

== Bibliography ==
- McMillan, James F. (8 January 2002). France and Women, 1789-1914: Gender, Society and Politics. Routledge. p. 130. ISBN 978-1-134-58957-9.
