= Bessèges station =

Railway station in Bessèges, France

Bessèges
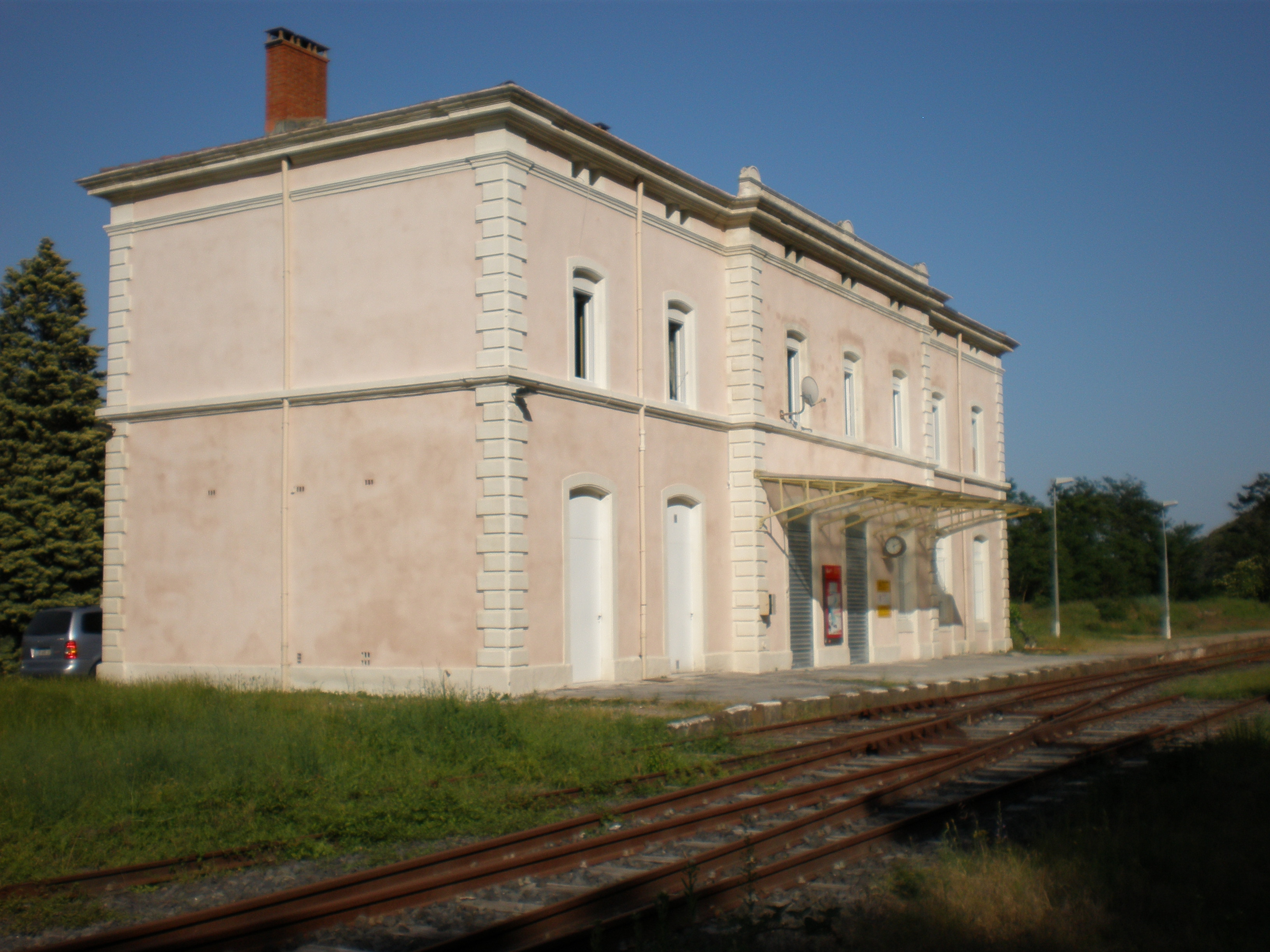
- Bessèges railway station

General information
- Location: Bessèges, Gard, Occitanie, France
- Coordinates: 44°17′18″N 4°06′04″E
- Line: Bessèges-Robiac railway
- Platforms: 2
- Tracks: 2

History
- Opened: 1 December 1857
- Closed: 2012
Location

Bessèges is a former railway station in Bessèges, Occitanie, France. The station is located on the Bessèges–Robiac railway. The station was served by TER (local) services to Alès operated by the SNCF. It was closed in 2012.
