= Simon-Emmanuel Duplay =

French surgeon (1836–1924)

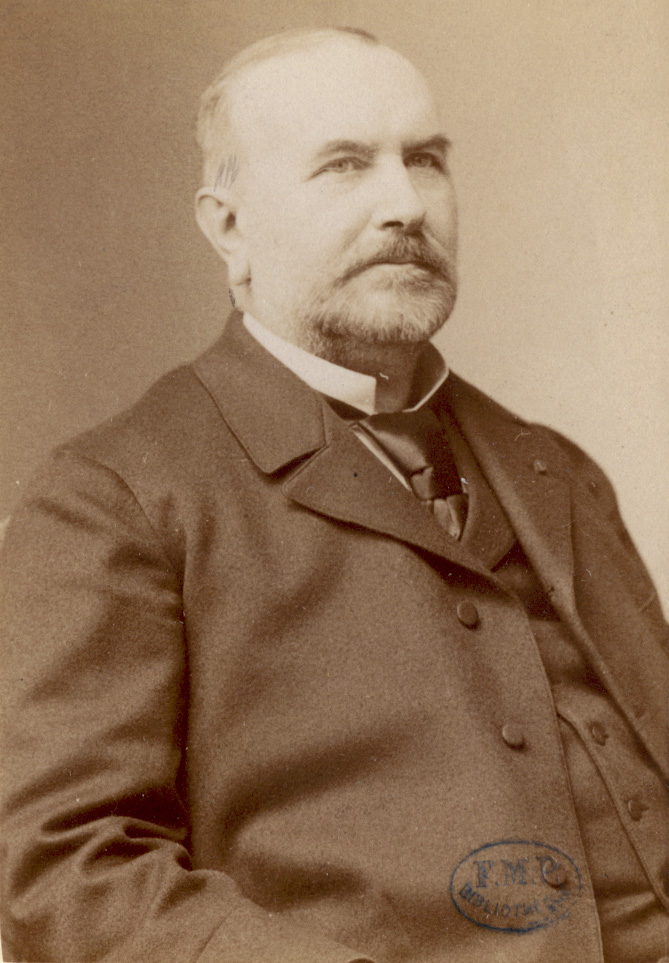
Simon-Emmanuel Duplay (1836-1924)

Simon-Emmanuel Duplay (10 September 1836, in Paris – 16 January 1924) was a French surgeon who was a member of the Académie de Médecine (1879).

He studied medicine in Paris, obtaining his agrégation for surgery in 1866 with a thesis on umbilical hernias titled De la hernia ombilicale. In 1867 he was appointed surgeon to the "Bureau central", later working at the Hôpital de Lourcine (1871) and the Hôpital Saint-Antoine (from 1872). In 1880 he became a professor of surgical pathology, followed by a professorship in clinical surgery (1890).

In the late 19th century he provided a comprehensive description of periarthritis of the shoulder, a condition known today as frozen shoulder, and sometimes referred to as "Duplay's disease". With German surgeon Karl Thiersch (1822-1895), his name is associated with an operation for repair of distal hypospadias (Thiersch-Duplay technique). He is also credited with creation of a nasal speculum.

== Selected writings ==
- Des Collections séreuses et hydatiques de l'aine, 1865
- De la hernie ombilicale, 1866
- De 1'hypospadias perineo-scrotal et de son traitement chirurgical. Arch. Gen. Med., 1:613:657, 1874
- Sur le traitement chirurgical de l’hypospadias et de l’epispadias. Arch. Gen. Med., 145: 257, 1880.
- Traité de chirurgie (with Paul Reclus, 8 tomes), 1890-92.
- Manuel de diagnostic chirurgical, 1897.
