= Élisée Reclus =

French geographer, writer and anarchist (1830–1905)

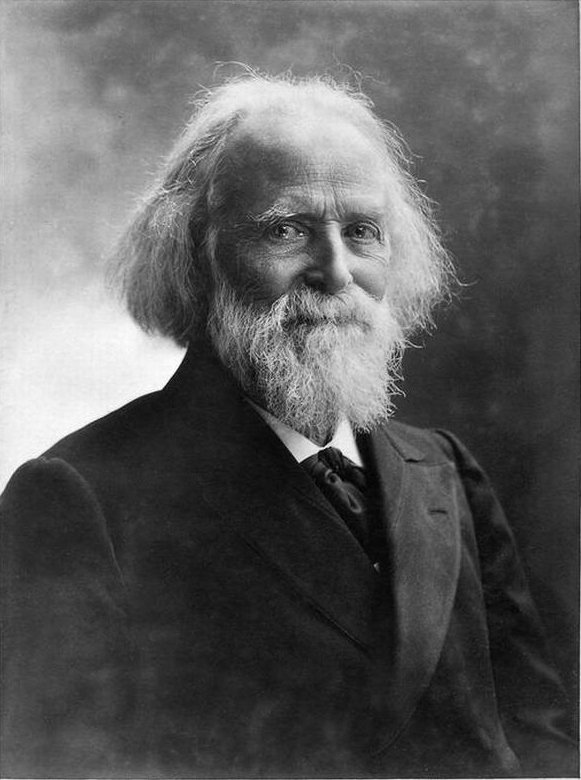
- Reclus, c. 1900
- Born: 15 March 1830; Sainte-Foy-la-Grande, Gironde, France
- Died: 4 July 1905 (aged 75); Torhout, Belgium
- Education: University of Berlin
- Occupations: Geographer; anarchist revolutionary; writer
- Notable work: La Nouvelle Géographie universelle, la terre et les hommes
- Movement: Anarchism
- Parents: Jacques Reclus (father); Marguerite Zéline Trigant (mother)
- Relatives: Onésime Reclus; Élie Reclus; Paul Reclus; Jacques Reclus; Armand Reclus
- Family: Reclus family

Jacques Élisée Reclus (French: [ʁəkly]; 15 March 1830 – 4 July 1905) was a French geographer, writer, anarchist, and a vegetarian. He produced his 19-volume masterwork, La Nouvelle Géographie universelle, la terre et les hommes (Universal Geography), over a period of nearly 20 years (1875–1894). In 1892 he was awarded the Gold Medal of the Paris Geographical Society for this work, despite having been banished from France because of his political activism.

== Biography ==
=== Early life and education ===
Reclus was born at Sainte-Foy-la-Grande (Gironde) on March 15, 1830. The Reclus family were part of the Protestant minority in France. His father, Jacques Reclus, was a Protestant pastor in Montcaret and taught at Sainte-Foy's Protestant college; Reclus' godfather was the Protestant pastor Jacques Drillholle. Reclus' mother, Marguerite Zéline Trigant, was a teacher and founded a school at Orthez. Reclus spent his early years at the home of his maternal grandparents in Laroche, until he rejoined his family in 1838 at Castétarbe.

Reclus was the second son in a family of fourteen children. His brothers were Onésime, Élie, Paul, and Armand - who went on to be men of letters, politicians or members of the learned professions.

Reclus began his education in Rhenish Prussia, and continued higher studies at the Protestant college of Montauban, after he had studied for a baccalaureate at Sainte-Foy. While studying at Sainte-Foy, Reclus and his brother lived with their aunt. Reclus felt dissatisfied with his studies at Montauban, moving four kilometers away to study independently in a house with his brothers and their friend Édouard Grimard. In 1849, without authorisation to take leave from the school, Élisée, Élie and Edouard journeyed on foot from Montauban to the Mediterranean Sea; shortly after this episode, the Reclus brothers were expelled from the school, in part because of their political views.

Reclus moved to Berlin in 1851 and completed his studies at the University of Berlin, where he followed a long course of geography under Carl Ritter and also studied political economy and the history of diseases.

=== Adult life and career ===
Withdrawing from France due to the political events of December 1851, he spent the next six years (1852–1857) traveling and working in Great Britain, the United States, Central America, and Colombia. Arriving in Louisiana in 1853, Reclus worked for about two and a half years as a tutor to the children of cousin Septime and Félicité Fortier at their plantation Félicité, located about 80 kilometres (50 miles) upriver from New Orleans. He recounted his passage through the Mississippi River Delta and impressions of antebellum New Orleans and the state in Fragment d'un voyage à la Nouvelle-Orléans, published in 1855.

On 11 March 1858, he was initiated in the regular Scottish Rite Masonic Lodge Les Émules d'Hiram, affiliated to the Grand Orient of France. His brother was just initiated and took part in his masonic baptism. He remained at the initial degrees of the Masonic spiritual path.

On his return to Paris, Reclus contributed to the Revue des deux mondes, the Tour du monde and other periodicals, a large number of articles embodying the results of his geographical work. Among other works of this period was the short book Histoire d'un ruisseau, in which he traced the development of a great river from source to mouth. During 1867 and 1868, he published La Terre; description des phénomènes de la vie du globe in two volumes.

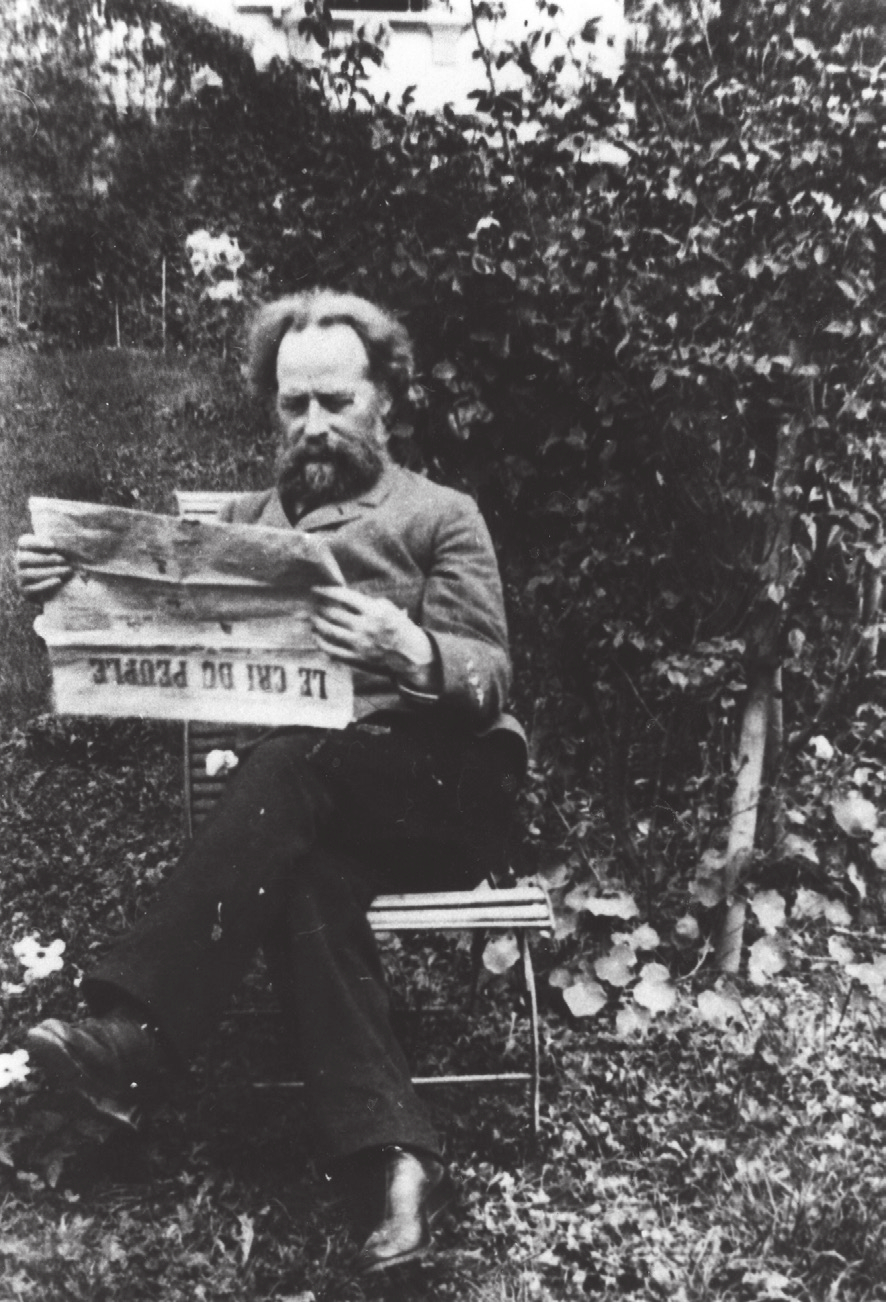
Reclus reading Le Cri du Peuple in the garden of his home in Brussels, c. 1894–1905

During the Siege of Paris (1870–1871), Reclus shared in the aerostatic operations conducted by Félix Nadar, and also served in the National Guard. As a member of the Association Nationale des Travailleurs, he published a hostile manifesto against the government of Versailles in support of the Paris Commune of 1871 in the Cri du Peuple.

Continuing to serve in the National Guard, which was then in open revolt, Reclus was taken prisoner on 5 April into Fort Quélern. On 16 November, he was sentenced to deportation for life. Because of intervention by supporters from England, the sentence was commuted in January 1872 to perpetual banishment from France.

After a short visit to Italy, Reclus settled at Clarens, Switzerland, where he resumed his literary labours and produced Histoire d'une montagne, a companion to Histoire d'un ruisseau. There he wrote nearly the whole of his work, La Nouvelle Géographie universelle, la terre et les hommes, "an examination of every continent and country in terms of the effects that geographic features like rivers and mountains had on human populations—and vice versa." This compilation was profusely illustrated with maps, plans, and engravings. It was awarded the gold medal of the Paris Geographical Society in 1892. An English edition was published simultaneously, also in 19 volumes, the first four translated by E. G. Ravenstein, the rest by A. H. Keane. Reclus's writings were accurate and explained topics clearly, making them useful literary and scientific sources.

According to Kirkpatrick Sale:

His geographical work, thoroughly researched and unflinchingly scientific, laid out a picture of human-nature interaction that we today would call bioregionalism. It showed, with more detail than anyone but a dedicated geographer could possibly absorb, how the ecology of a place determined the kinds of lives and livelihoods its denizens would have and thus how people could properly live in self-regarding and self-determined bioregions without the interference of large and centralized governments that always try to homogenize diverse geographical areas.

In 1877–1878, he launched and ran Le Travailleur in Geneva.

In 1882, Reclus initiated the Anti-Marriage Movement. In accordance with these beliefs and the practice of union libre ("free unions"), which was common among working-class French in the mid-to-late 1800s, Reclus allowed his two daughters to "marry" their male partners without any civil or religious ceremonies, an action causing embarrassment to many of his well-wishers. Reclus had himself entered a free union in 1872, after the death of his first wife. In 1882 he also wrote Unions Libres, a pamphlet which detailed his anarchist and feminist objections to marriage. The French government initiated prosecution from the High Court of Lyon, arrested him and Peter Kropotkin as the International Association's organizers, and sentenced the latter to five years' imprisonment. Reclus escaped punishment as he remained in Switzerland.

In a 1913 piece, Kropotkin, in admiration of Reclus, said that if anyone asked about the conflicts of the Middle East, that "I should merely open the volume of Elisée Reclus's Geographie Universelle L'Asie, Russe..."

In 1890, Reclus hosted Luigi Galleani at Lake Geneva in Switzerland, in the Reclus brothers' country house which at that time operated as a safe haven for dissidents fleeing persecution. Reclus offered Galleani a role in writing his Universal Geography, with Galleani going on to contribute to statistics about Guatemala to volume XVII which addressed Central America. Reclus later assisted Galleani, and coordinated support for him, in fleeing Italy to Egypt when he faced persecution from the Italian state.

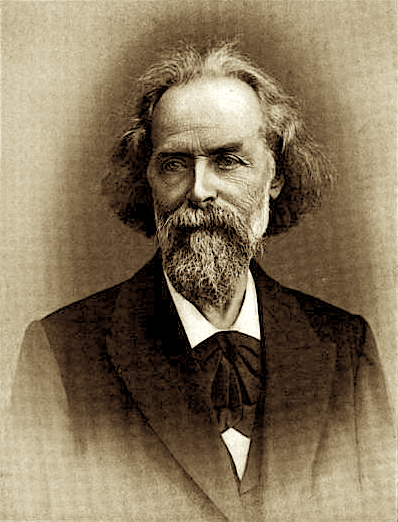
Élisée Reclus

In 1894, Reclus was appointed chair of comparative geography at the Free University of Brussels, and moved with his family to Belgium. His brother Élie Reclus was at the university already, teaching religion. Élisée Reclus continued to write, contributing several important articles and essays to French, German and English scientific journals. He was awarded the 1894 Patron's Medal of the Royal Geographical Society.

In 1905, shortly before his death, Reclus completed L'Homme et la terre, in which he rounded out his previous works by considering humanity's development relative to its geographical environment.

=== Death ===
Reclus died on July 4, 1905. He spent his final days in the countryside at Thourout, to the west of Brussels, staying with his friend Florence de Brouckère. Before he died, he completed the preface of the Russian edition of L'Homme et la Terre. His brother Paul, his sister Louise Dumesnil, and his nephew Paul were with him in his last moments. His daughter read him the news of the sailors' revolt on the Potemkin, and he smiled before dying peacefully.

Reclus was buried at a cemetery in Ixelles with his brother Élie, who had died in February 1904. Per Reclus' request, there was no funeral procession.

Kropotkin wrote an obituary for Reclus, which was published in The Geographic Journal in September, 1905. Kropotkin summarised:

"He knew how to die poor after having written wonderful books. And he knew how, having attained the high summits of fame, never to rule anybody and to remain the equal of his humblest collaborator and of every one he met with. He certainly was one of the finest specimens of civilized mankind, a man free in the purest sense of the word."

Following Reclus' death, his sister Louise was responsible for his personal archive of correspondence, family documents, and publications, and his nephew Paul saw to the publication of his posthumous works.

== Naturism ==
Reclus had strong views on naturism and the benefits of nudity. He argued that living naked was more hygienic than wearing clothes; he believed that it was healthier for skin to be fully exposed to light and air so that it could resume its "natural vitality and activity" and become more flexible and firm at the same time. He also argued that from an aesthetic point of view, nudity was better: naked people were more beautiful. His principal objection to clothing was, however, a moral one; he felt that a fixation with clothing caused excessive focus on what was covered.

== Personal life ==
Reclus was a friend of Italian anarchist Errico Malatesta.

Without first being engaged and against the advice of his parents, Reclus married Marguerite Claire, known as Clarisse Brian (1832-1869) in a ceremony at Sainte-Foy-La-Grande on December 13, 1858. Clarisse's father was a French sea captain and her mother was a Senegalese woman. Clarisse and Élisée had two daughters together. Élisée and Clarisse's first daughter, Marguerite (called Magali), was born on June 12, 1860 at 10 rue Bénard in Paris' 17th arrondissement. The birth was witnessed by Élie Reclus and Édouard Grimard. Their second daughter, Jeanne (called Jeannie) was born on the 1st of March, 1863 at 7 rue de la Plaine in Paris' 17th arrondissement. The birth was witnessed by Gustave Hickel and Élie Reclus. Élisée insisted against baptising his daughters.

== Legacy ==
Reclus was admired by many 19th century thinkers, including Alfred Russel Wallace, George Perkins Marsh, Patrick Geddes, Henry Stephens Salt, and Octave Mirbeau. James Joyce was influenced by Léon Metchnikoff's book La civilisation et les grands fleuves historiques, to which Reclus contributed a foreword.

Reclus advocated for nature conservation and opposed meat-eating and cruelty to animals. He was a vegetarian. Reclus opposed the domestication of animals for food as a "great evil", writing that "domestication of animals exhibits in many ways moral regression since, far from improving animals, we have deformed and corrupted them". Reclus connected humankind's relationship with the natural world to property rights, the family household, and mutual aid. His ideas are seen by some historians and writers as anticipating the modern social ecology and animal rights movements.

Reclus has been recognised, among other scholars whose work predates Alfred Wegener, for presenting early evidence for continental drift in The Earth (1872). James O. Berkland described Reclus as one of the theory's "foremost pioneers". In 2021, Reclus, a tectonics database, was named for Reclus in recognition of his contributions to the early description and illustration of various geological features.

The Lycée Élisée Reclus high school in Sainte-Foy-la-Grande is named for him.

== Selected works ==
=== Books ===
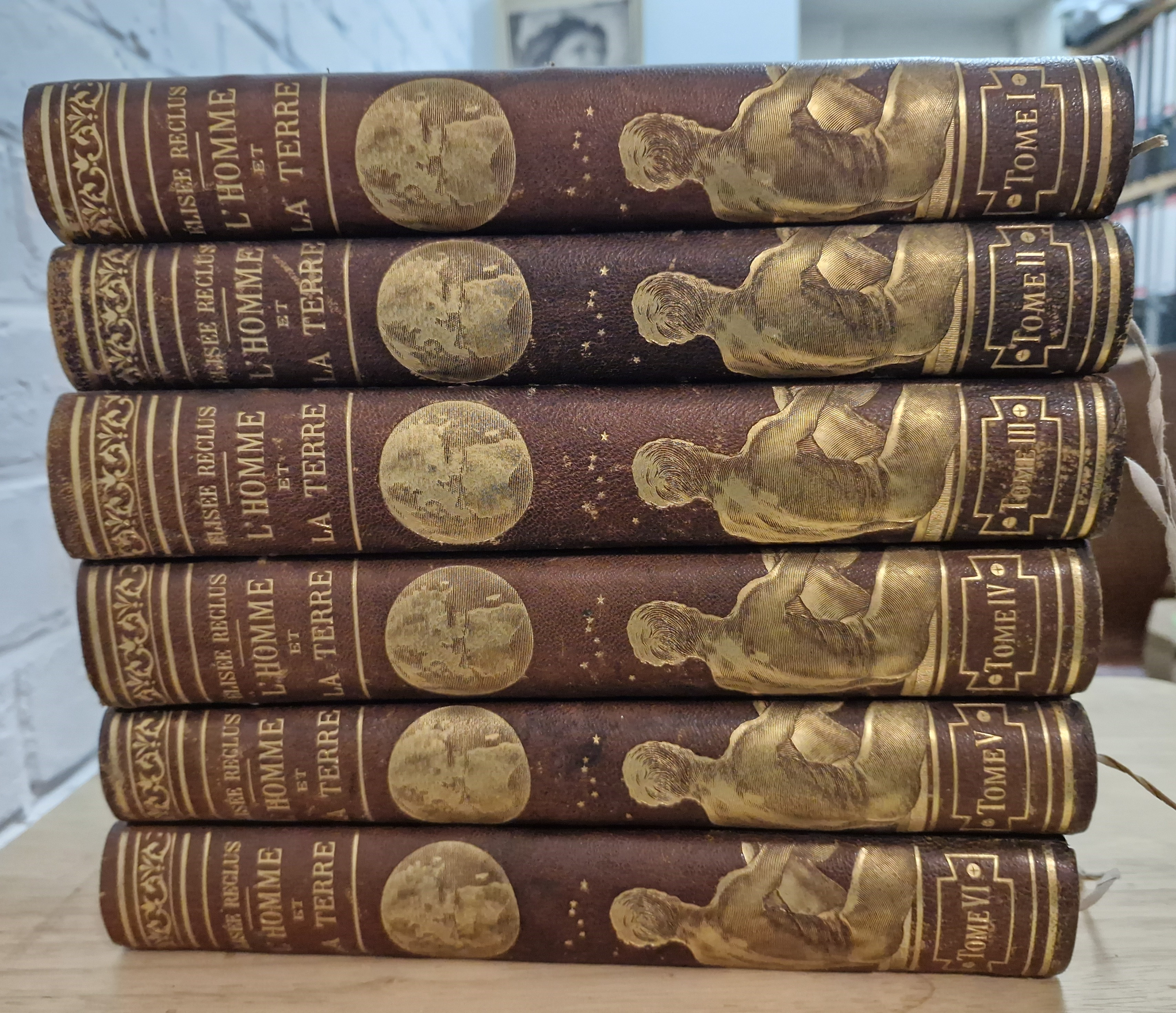
L'Homme et la terre (The Earth and its inhabitants) 6 volumes (1905-1908)

L'Homme et la terre (The Earth and Its Inhabitants), 6 volumes:

- L'Homme et la terre (1905), e-text online, Internet Archive
- Élisée Reclus (1876–1894), A.H. Keane (ed.), The Earth and its Inhabitants, London: Virtue & Co.
  - v.5 Russia in Europe, etc. (Index)
  - v.6 Asiatic Russia (Index)
- Elisée Reclus (1890). The Earth and Its Inhabitants. D. Appleton and Company.
- Élisée Reclus (1883–1893), The Earth and its Inhabitants, New York: D. Appleton, OCLC 6631001
  - Europe: v.1, v.2, v.3, v.4, v.5
  - North America: v.1, v.2, v.3
  - Africa: v.1 v.2 v.3 v.4.
- The earth and its inhabitants. The universal geography, ed. by E.G. Ravenstein (A.H. Keane). (J.S. Virtue, 1878)
- The earth and its inhabitants, Asia, Volume 1 (D. Appleton and Company, 1891)
- The Earth and Its Inhabitants ...: Asiatic Russia: Caucasia, Aralo-Caspian basin, Siberia (D. Appleton and Company, 1891)
- The Earth and Its Inhabitants ...: South-western Asia (D. Appleton and Company, 1891)

=== Anthology ===
- Du sentiment de la nature dans les sociétés modernes et autres textes, Éditions Premières Pierres, 2002 – ISBN 9782913534049

=== Articles ===
- The Progress of Mankind (Contemporary Review, 1896)
- Attila de Gerando (Revue Géographie, 1898)
- A Great Globe (Geograph. Journal, 1898)
- L'Extrême-Orient (Bulletin de la Société royale de géographie d'Anvers, 1898), a study of the political geography of the Far East and its possible changes
- La Guerre du Paraguay. Revue des Deux Mondes. 1867. A report made for Parisian newspapers about the Paraguayan War, sympathetic towards the Paraguayan side.
- La Perse (Bulletin de la Société neuchâteloise, 1899)
- La Phénicie et les Phéniciens (ibid., 1900)
- La Chine et la diplomatie européenne (L'Humanité nouvelle series, 1900)
- L'Enseignement de la géographie (Institut de géographie de Bruxelles, No 5, 1901)
- On Vegetarianism (Humane Review, 1901)

== See also ==
- Anarchism in France
- Green anarchism

== Bibliography ==
- Brun, Christophe (2014). Elisée Reclus, une chronologie familiale 1796-2014 [Élisée Reclus, a family chronology (1796-2014)] (in French) (1st ed.).
- Brun, Christophe (2015). Elisée Reclus, une chronologie familiale : sa vie, ses voyages, ses écrits, ses ascendants, ses collatéraux, les descendants, leurs écrits, sa postérité, 1796-2015 [Élisée Reclus, a family chronology: His life, his travels, his writings, his ancestors, his collaterals, the descendants, their writings, his posterity (1796-2015)] (in French) (2nd ed.).
- Fleming, Marie (1988). The Geography of Freedom: The Odyssey of Élisée Reclus. Montréal: Black Rose Books. ISBN 0-921689-16-0.
- This article incorporates text from a publication now in the public domain: Chisholm, Hugh, ed. (1911). "Reclus, Jean Jacques Elisée". Encyclopædia Britannica. Vol. 22 (11th ed.). Cambridge University Press. pp. 957–958.
- Senta, Antonio (2019). Luigi Galleani: The Most Dangerous Anarchist in America. Translated by Asali, Andrea; Sayers, Sean. AK Press. ISBN 9781849353489.
