= La Roche-Chalais =

- Commune
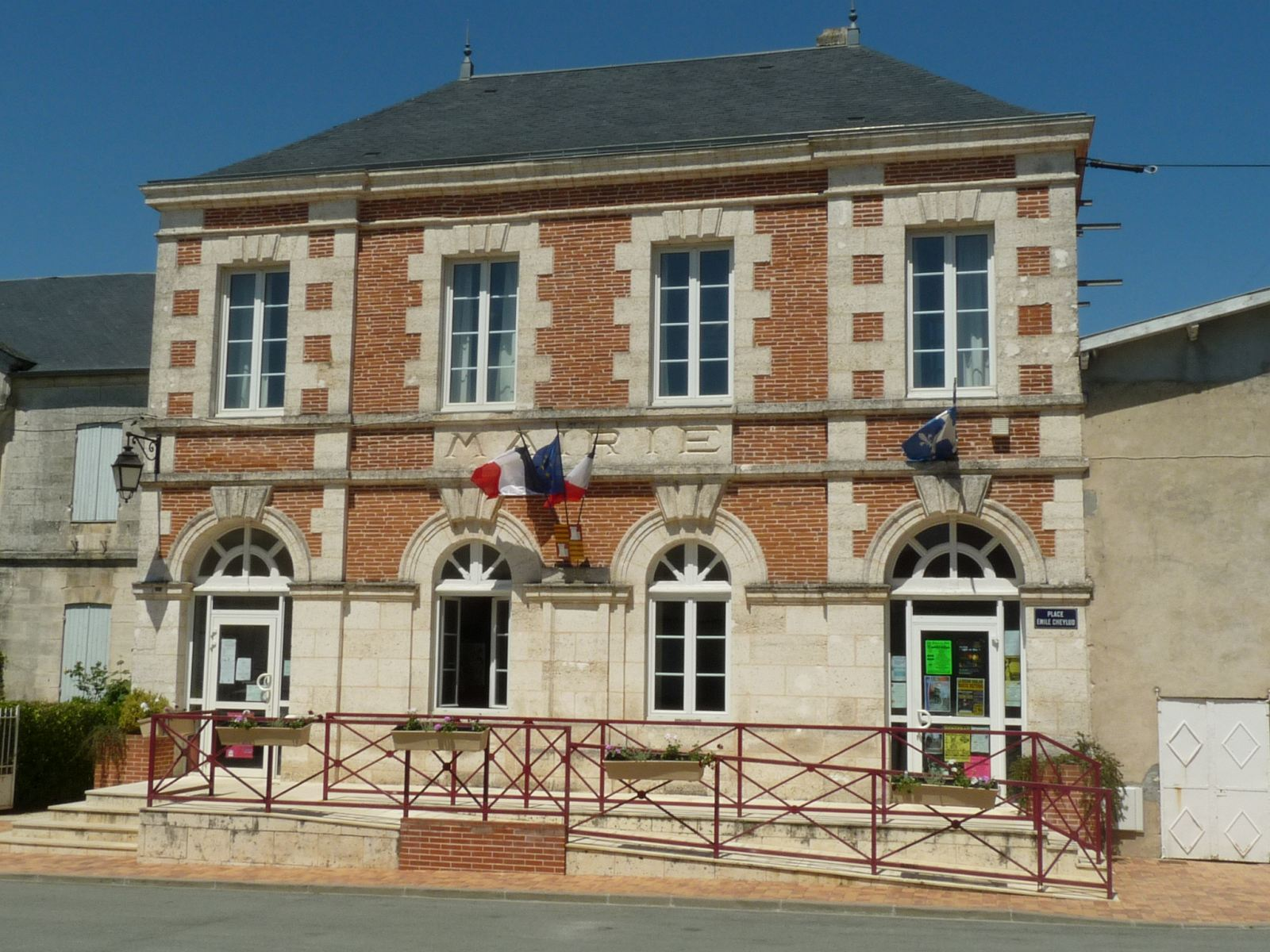
- The town hall in La Roche-Chalais

- Coat of arms
- Location of La Roche-Chalais
- Location within France Location within Nouvelle-Aquitaine
- Coordinates: 45°09′09″N 0°00′35″E
- Country: France
- Region: Nouvelle-Aquitaine
- Department: Dordogne
- Arrondissement: Périgueux
- Canton: Montpon-Ménestérol

Government
  - Mayor (2020–2026): Jean-Michel Sautreau
- Area^{1}: 89.40 km^{2} (34.52 sq mi)
- Elevation: 40 m (130 ft)
- Highest elevation: 126 m (413 ft)
- Lowest elevation: 12 m (39 ft)
- Population (2023): 3,060
  - Density: 34.2/km^{2} (88.7/sq mi)
- Time zone: UTC+01:00 (CET)
  - Summer (DST): UTC+02:00 (CEST)
- INSEE/Postal code: 24354 /24490
- ^{1} French Land Register data, which excludes lakes, ponds, glaciers > 1 km^{2} (0.386 sq mi or 247 acres) and river estuaries.

La Roche-Chalais (French pronunciation: [la ʁɔʃ ʃalɛ]; Occitan: La Ròcha Chalés) is a commune in the Dordogne department in Nouvelle-Aquitaine in southwestern France.

== Population ==
In 1973 the former communes of Saint-Michel-de-Rivière and Saint-Michel-l'Écluse-et-Léparon were absorbed into La Roche-Chalais.

Historical population

| Year | Pop. | ±% p.a. |
|---|---|---|
| 1793 | 1,015 | — |
| 1800 | 1,395 | +4.65% |
| 1806 | 1,484 | +1.04% |
| 1821 | 1,491 | +0.03% |
| 1831 | 2,065 | +3.31% |
| 1836 | 1,910 | −1.55% |
| 1841 | 2,144 | +2.34% |
| 1846 | 2,333 | +1.70% |
| 1851 | 2,427 | +0.79% |
| 1856 | 2,379 | −0.40% |
| 1861 | 2,475 | +0.79% |
| 1866 | 2,556 | +0.65% |
| 1872 | 2,364 | −1.29% |
| 1876 | 2,232 | −1.43% |
| 1881 | 2,430 | +1.71% |
| 1886 | 2,409 | −0.17% |
| 1891 | 1,608 | −7.77% |
| 1896 | 1,509 | −1.26% |
| 1901 | 1,564 | +0.72% |

| Year | Pop. | ±% p.a. |
|---|---|---|
| 1906 | 1,602 | +0.48% |
| 1911 | 1,535 | −0.85% |
| 1921 | 1,324 | −1.47% |
| 1926 | 1,231 | −1.45% |
| 1931 | 1,303 | +1.14% |
| 1936 | 1,179 | −1.98% |
| 1946 | 1,186 | +0.06% |
| 1954 | 1,134 | −0.56% |
| 1962 | 1,254 | +1.27% |
| 1968 | 1,379 | +1.60% |
| 1975 | 2,997 | +11.73% |
| 1982 | 2,951 | −0.22% |
| 1990 | 2,860 | −0.39% |
| 1999 | 2,801 | −0.23% |
| 2007 | 2,799 | −0.01% |
| 2012 | 2,913 | +0.80% |
| 2017 | 2,999 | +0.58% |
| 2023 | 3,060 | +0.34% |

Source: EHESS and INSEE (1975-2023)

== See also ==
- Communes of the Dordogne department
