= Armand Reclus =

French geographer and explorer (1843–1927)

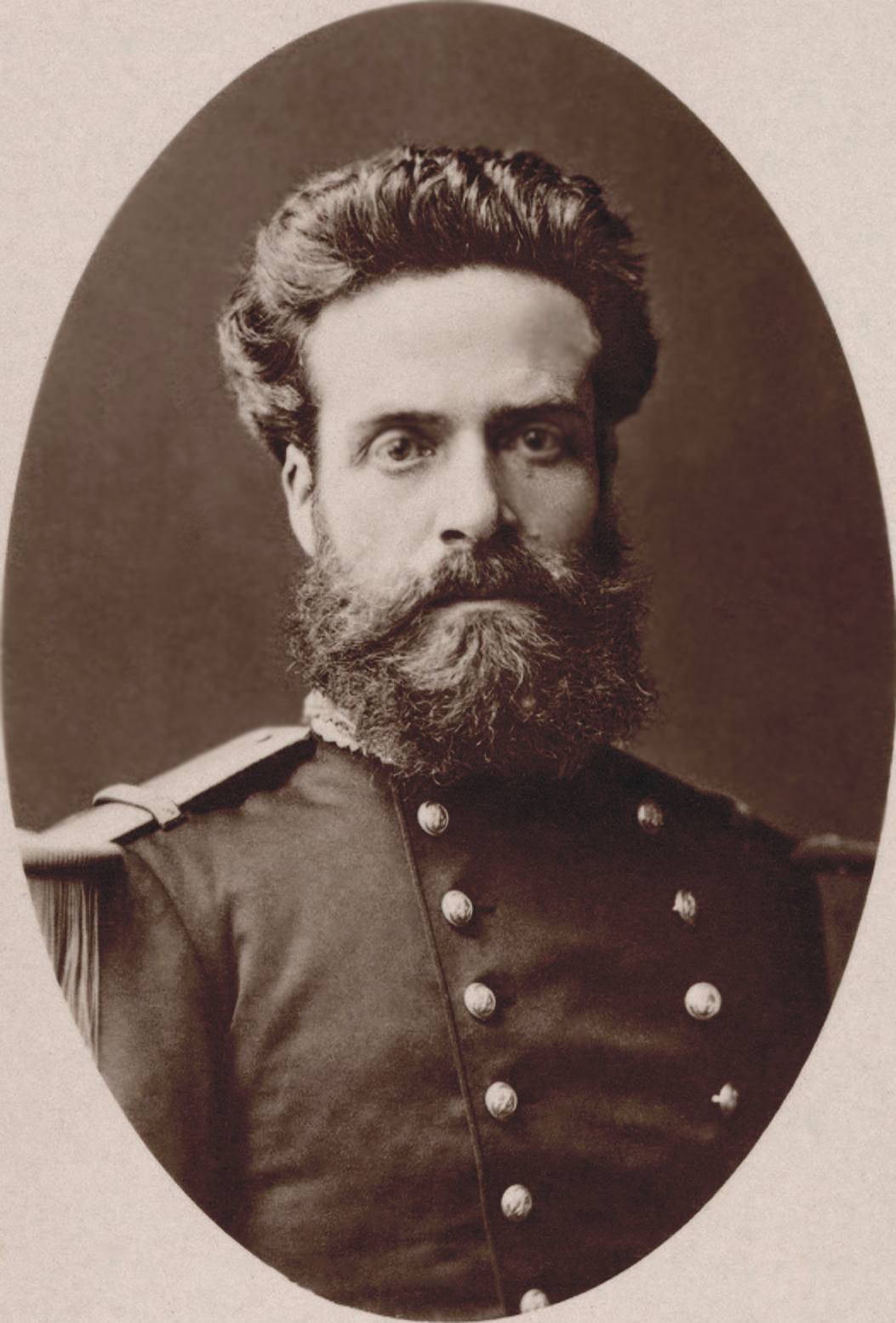
- Armand Reclus, c. 1880
- Born: 13 March 1843; Orthez, France
- Died: 9 January 1927 (aged 83)
- Education: École navale
- Occupations: Naval officer and engineer, explorer, geographer

Armand Reclus (13 March 1843 – 9 January 1927) was a French naval engineer and geographer, known for his involvement in the development of the Panama Canal. He graduated top of his class in the Imperial Naval College in 1862, and went on to take part in campaigns in the Pacific and in French colonial actions in Indochina.

Like his brothers, Élisée, Élie, Onésime, and Paul Reclus, Armand was a geographer and took part in the 1876–1878 exploration of the Darien with Ferdinand de Lesseps. The route for the Panama Canal that he proposed was adopted by the International Geography Congress in 1879, and he directed the drilling site as the project began. However, he resigned in 1882 after realising the scale of the challenge.

After leaving the French navy, he owned vineyards in France and Tunisia where he spent his time. He returned to France in 1911, and died in 1927 – the last of the Reclus brothers.

== Biography ==
Elie Armand Ebenhezer Reclus was born at Orthez on March 13, 1843 - the fifth of the Reclus brothers. His parents were Jacques Reclus and Marguerite Zéline Trigant.

Like his brothers, he studied at the Protestant college of Sainte-Foy-la-Grande, where his father had taught. He was then sent to Neuqied in Germany as part of the Protestant brotherhood (the Morovian Brothers). There he learned English, German, Spanish, Swedish, and Dutch.

Reclus returned to France in 1857, aged sixteen, and joined the imperial naval school. He was granted a scholarship by the municipal council of Orthez. At the college, he befriended Lucien Napoléon-Bonaparte Wyse.

== Naval career ==
He graduated from the naval school top of his class on 1 August 1862, and was assigned to Toulon as a midshipman of the 2nd class. In the following years, he participated in several campaigns in the China Seas and the Japan, took part in colonial conquests in Indochina, and took the opportunity to learn Chinese.

In 1864, he was appointed midshipman of the 1st class. Until 1867, he was chief of watch on a sailing frigate, the Isis. In 1869, he went to New Caledonia, China and Japan, where he stayed the following year and was promoted to lieutenant. Back in France, he was based in Toulon from 1872 to 1874 as an officer on the Alexandre, a propeller ship. During this period, he learned Russian.

On 8 December 1874, he married Eva Guignard (1853–1948), daughter of a wine merchant, in Sainte-Foy-la-Grande. In 1875, on a reconnaissance mission in the Baltic Sea, he was arrested by the German Empire and spent five months in prison for having drawn coastal fortresses without authorization. Expelled to France, he was then assigned to the office of the Minister of the Navy. The same year, he became a member of the Paris Geographic Society, sponsored by his brother Onésime. His only daughter Jeanne (1875–1940) was born on October 8.

When Ferdinand de Lesseps charged Lucien Napoléon-Bonaparte Wyse with the design of a canal linking the Atlantic and Pacific oceans at the level of the Darién, Lucien chose Armand as his second.

=== Panama ===
Wyse and Reclus set sail on the Le Lafayette on 7 November 1876 leading an international scientific team, for a first expedition that lasted until April 1877, during which three members of the team died. A second expedition took place from November 1877 to May 1878, Armand Reclus coming close to death several times. In the tropical forest, Reclus took notes, made surveys, and created maps to determine the optimal route for the future Panama Canal. He describes these explorations in several publications, including one co-written with Wyse. During these trips he witnessed the Panama fire on March 7, 1878.

Armand Reclus presented the Panama Canal project at the International Congress of Geography held in Paris in 1879. Ferdinand de Lesseps was charged with the project. Armand Reclus, who had returned to the Ministry of the Navy in 1881, requested secondment to organise the start of the project. Faced with greater challenges than he had expected, he resigned from this position on 1 July 1882 and returned to the French Navy.

== Later life ==
He left the Navy in 1885 to settle in Tunisia, running a large wine estate. He spent most of his time there, interspersed with stays in Paris and at the Château d'Eynesse, where he also owned vineyards. He received a gold medal for his Tunisian wines at the Universal Exhibition of 1889.

He handed over the management of his Tunisian operation to his son-in-law André Joubin, and moved to Eynesse in 1911. At the end of his life, he became a supporter of the Action française, clearly distinguishing himself from his anarchist or socialist brothers.

In 1923, he was elevated to the rank of Officer of the Legion of Honor by the President of the Republic, shortly before the official inauguration of the monument in honor of the builders of the canal in Panama. The last of the five Reclus brothers still alive, he died in Eynesse on January 9, 1927, and was buried in the family cemetery on the edge of a plot of vines, at Jarnac.

== Publications ==
- Le Canal interocéanique et les explorations dans l’Isthme américain, Bulletin de la Société de géographie commerciale de Paris, v. 1, 1879.
- Le canal interocéanique, 1879, avec Lucien Napoléon Bonaparte-Wyse.
- Explorations aux isthmes de Panama et de Darien, Le Tour du monde, vol. 39, nos 991-1016 du 1er semestre 1880 et vol. 40, nos 1017-1042 du 2e semestre 1880
- Panama et Darien, Voyages d’exploration (1876-1878), Paris, Hachette, 1881.
- Panama et Darien, Voyages d’exploration (1876-1878), Eaux-Bonnes, Pédelahore-Transhumance, texte complet, et orthographe entièrement révisée ISBN 9791093533346.

== Sources ==
- Brun, Christophe; Ferretti, Federico (April 2015). Elisée Reclus, une chronologie familiale : sa vie, ses voyages, ses écrits, ses ascendants, ses collatéraux, les descendants, leurs écrits, sa postérité, 1796–2015 (in French) (2nd ed.).
