= Paul Reclus (surgeon) =

French physician (1847–1914)

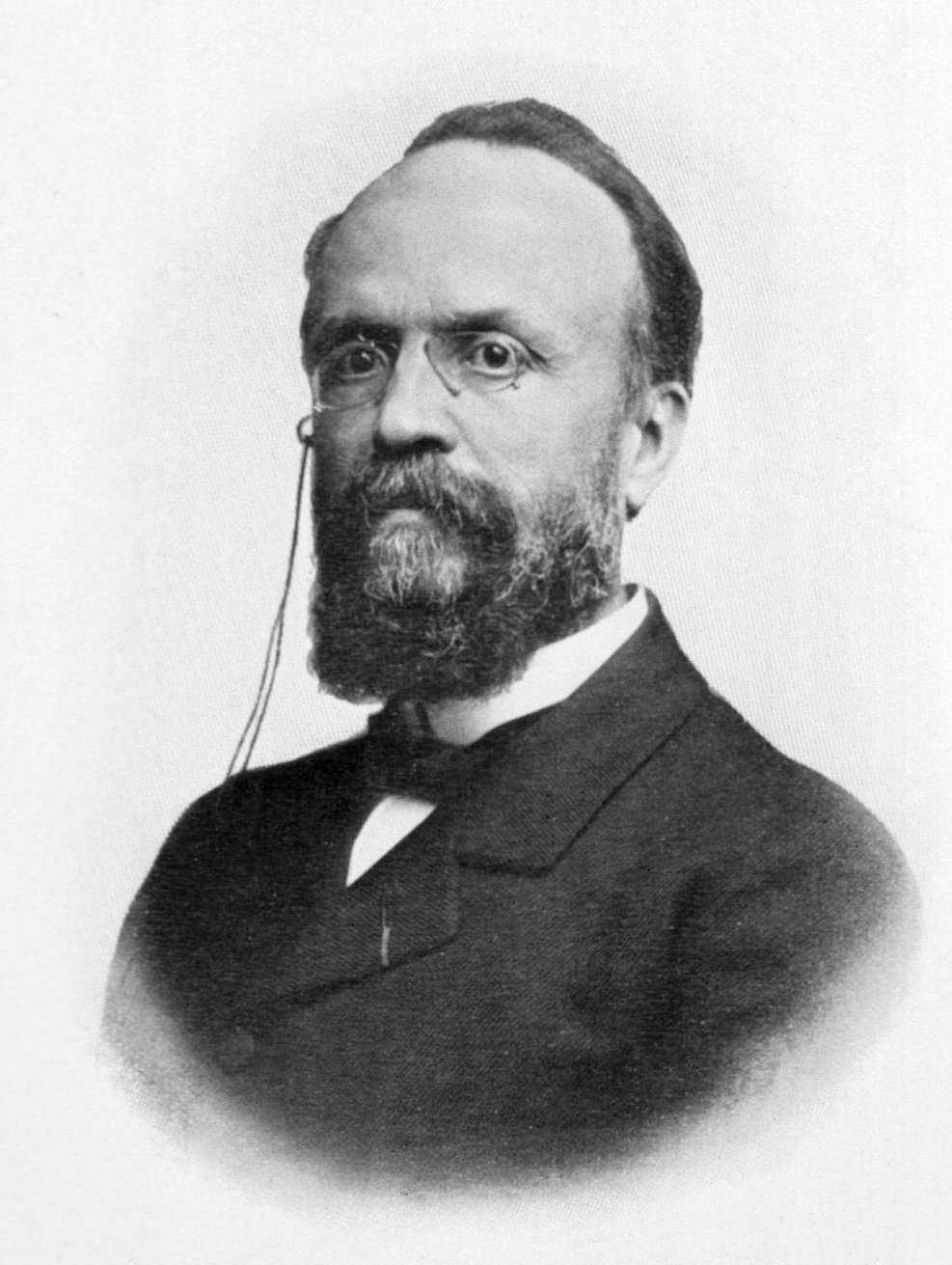
- Born: 7 March 1847; Orthez, France
- Died: 29 July 1914 (aged 67); Paris, France
- Education: University of Paris
- Known for: Reclus' disease
- Scientific career
- Fields: Medicine
- Workplaces: University of Paris

Jean Jacques Paul Reclus (7 March 1847 – 29 July 1914) was a French physician specializing in surgery. The Reclus' disease is named after him. He was the son of pastor Jacques Reclus and brother of Élie, Élisée, Onésime and Armand Reclus.

He is known for his research of local anesthetics, particularly cocaine.

== Selected publications ==
- Sur les lésions histologiques de la syphilis testiculaire. Paris 1881 – (with Louis-Charles Malassez)
- Cliniques chirurgicales de l'Hôtel-Dieu, 1888
- Traité de chirurgie, 1890-92 (8 tomes, with Simon-Emmanuel Duplay).
- Cliniques chirurgicales de la Pitié. 1894
- La cocaine en chirurgie, 1895
- L'anesthésie localisée par la cocaïne, 1903
- Les frères Élie et Elisée Reclus [ou, Du protestantisme à l'anarchisme]. - The brothers Élie Reclus and Elisée Reclus (or from Protestantism to anarchism). (by Jean Jacques Paul Reclus, Élie Reclus and friends of Élisée Reclus).

== Associated eponym ==
"Reclus' disease" is an abscess on the neck that causes a woody hardening of subcutaneous connective tissue. Reclus described the disease in an article titled: Phlégmon ligneux de cou. Revue de Chirurgie, Paris, 1896, 16: 522–531.
