= Onésime Reclus =

French geographer (1837–1916)

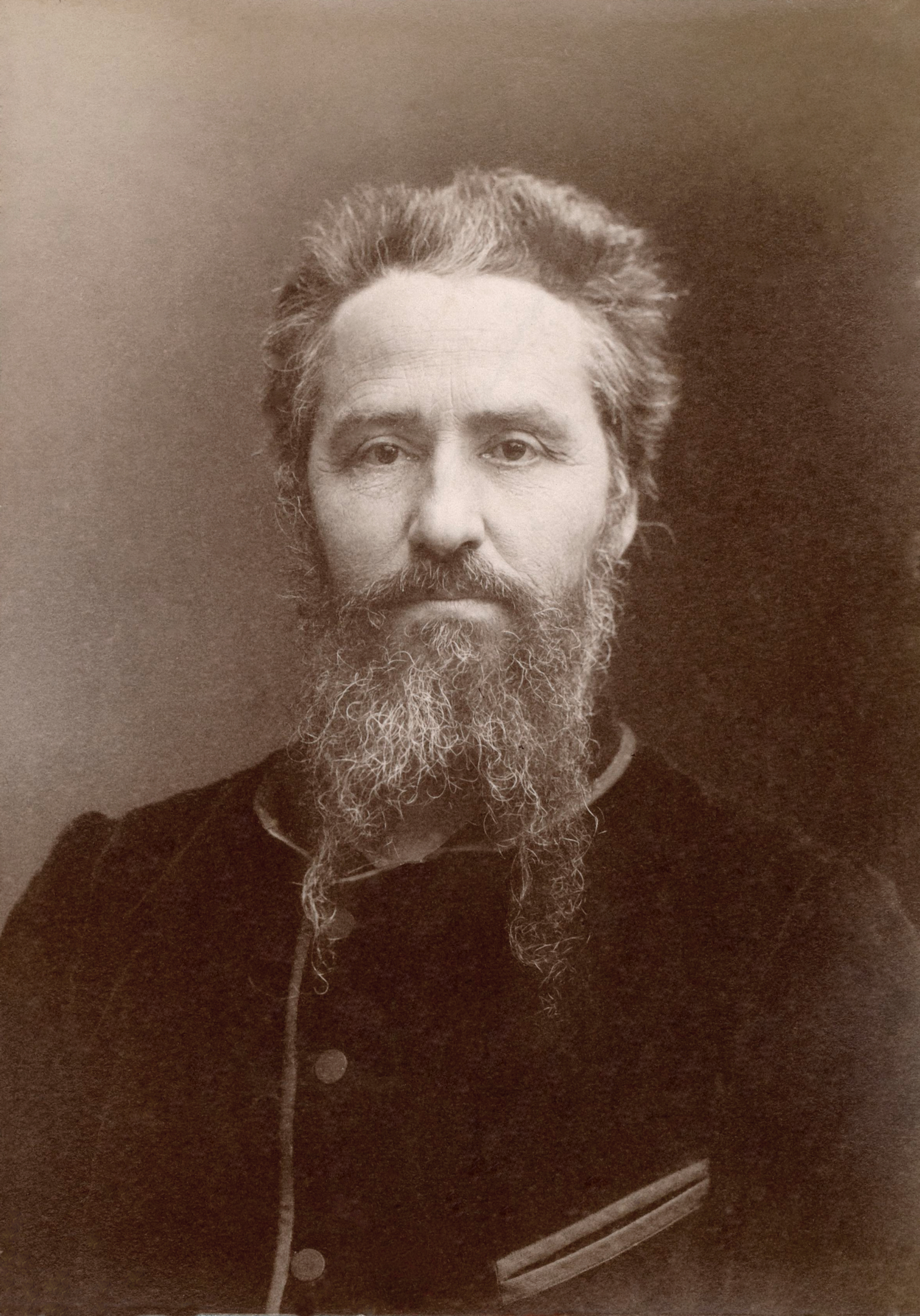
Onésime Reclus (1837–1916)

Onésime Reclus (22 September 1837 – 30 June 1916) was a French geographer who specialized in the relations between France and its colonies.

In 1880 he coined the term "Francophonie" as a means of classification of peoples of the world, being determined by the language they all spoke. While this term did not appear in dictionaries until 1930, it has become more important since the late 20th century as part of conceptual rethinking of cultures and geography.

He was born in Orthez and died in Paris.

== Early life and education ==
Onésime was born as the middle of five sons of Jacques Reclus (1796–1882), a Protestant minister, and his wife. His brothers also became notable in their fields. His family had moved to Orthez from Sainte-Foy-la-Grande, where at least one of his brothers was born. His next older and younger brothers both became geographers:

- Élie Reclus (1827–1904), journalist and political activist
- Élisée Reclus (1830–1905), award-winning geographer and anarchist
- Armand Reclus (1843–1927), geographer and explorer
- Paul Reclus (1847–1914), surgeon

== Career ==
Reclus became a geographer. He was particularly interested in France and its colonies, which was the subject of his first book, published in 1873. By this time, France's colonies in Africa were more important than those in the Caribbean, and it had lost or given up those in North America by the early 19th century. But its history of deep involvement in colonial development in North America continued to influence its politics.

From 1869, Reclus was a member of the Société de Géographie. He was a contributor to the journal Tour du monde.

In 1880 Reclus coined the term "Francophonie" as a means of classification of peoples of the world who spoke the French language. He believed that people were connected by their language and culture, for instance, the continental French as well as French speakers in the Caribbean and Africa. While this term did not appear in dictionaries until 1930, it has become more important since the late 20th century as part of conceptual rethinking by historians, geographers, anthropologists and others of cultures and geography. For instance, there has been study of the state of Louisiana, and especially the city of New Orleans, as places of strong French-language culture.

Reclus continued to be interested in issues related to France and its colonies, publishing a book on France and Algeria in 1886.

== Selected writings ==
- Géographie de la France et de ses colonies, 1873
- Géographie : La Terre à vol d’oiseau, 1877
- France, Algérie et colonies, 1886
- À la France : sites et monuments, 1900–1906
- Lâchons l’Asie, prenons l’Afrique : Où renaître ? et comment durer ?, 1904
- Atlas pittoresque de la France, recueil de vues géographiques et pittoresques de tous les départements, accompagnées de notices géographiques et de légendes explicatives, 1910–1912.

== Marriage and family ==
He married and had a family. One of their sons was the noted historian Maurice Reclus (1883–1972).
