= Madrigal (disambiguation) =

Madrigal is a European musical form of the 16th and 17th centuries.

Madrigal may also refer to:

== Literature ==
=== Works ===
- Madrigal (poetry), a type of poem
- "Madrigal", a poem by Federico García Lorca
- "Madrigal", a spy novel by John Gardner

=== Characters ===
- Madrigal, a main character in the Daughter of Smoke and Bone trilogy by Laini Taylor
- Anna Madrigal, fictional character from Armistead Maupin's novel series Tales of the City
- Miss Madrigal, a character in the play The Chalk Garden by Enid Bagnold
- Madrigal Raith, aka Darby Crane, a character in the novel Proven Guilty by Jim Butcher
- Madeline Madrigal, aka Ma-Ma, a character in the 2012 movie Dredd
- Madrigal, a mysterious family branch in the novel series: The 39 Clues
- The Madrigal family, a group of characters from the 2021 Disney animated film Encanto
  - Mirabel Madrigal, a fictional character and protagonist of Encanto
  - Bruno Madrigal, a fictional character in Encanto, uncle of the protagonist
  - Isabela Madrigal, a fictional character in Encanto, sister of the protagonist
- The Madrigal, a local kingpin in the novel Legends & Lattes by Travis Baldree

== Music ==
=== Forms ===
- Madrigal comedy, entertainment music of late 16th century Italy, featuring a cappella madrigals
- Madrigal dinner, a form of dinner theater incorporating comedy, madrigals, and a feast
- Madrigal (Trecento), an Italian musical form of the fourteenth and early fifteenth centuries

=== Artists ===
- Madrigal (ensemble) an early music group formed in 1965 by the Russian composer and harpsichord player Andrey Volkonsky
- Madrigal (band), a Canadian rock band of the early 1970s

=== Classical compositions ===
- "Madrigal" (Fauré), an 1883 song by Gabriel Fauré
- Madrigal, a composition for organ by Edwin Lemare (1865-1934)
- Madrigal, a piano composition by Lao Silesu (1883-1953)
- Madrigal, a composition for trombones by Georges Delerue (1925-1992)
- Madrigal, a composition for violin and piano by Ma Sicong
- Madrigal, a song by Cécile Chaminade (1857-1944)

=== Albums ===
- Madrigals (aka Love Songs for Madrigals and Madriguys), a 1974 recording by Swingle II
- Madrigal (album) (マドリガル, Madorigaru), a 2001 album by Japanese singer Chara

=== Songs ===
- "Madrigal", a song sung by Andy Williams from The Academy Award–Winning "Call Me Irresponsible" and Other Hit Songs from the Movies 1964
- "Madrigal", a song by American singer Neil Diamond, from the album Tap Root Manuscript 1970
- "Madrigal", a song by the Canadian rock band Rush, from the album A Farewell to Kings 1977
- "Madrigal", a song by British progressive rock band Yes, from the album Tormato 1978
- "Madrigal", a song by Swedish progressive metal band Opeth, from the album My Arms, Your Hearse 1998
- "Madrigal", a song by Puerto Rican singer and songwriter Danny Rivera
- "Madrigal", a song by Japanese band Malice Mizer, from the album Voyage Sans Retour 1996
- "Madrigal", a song by Australian band Taxiride, from the album Garage Mahal 2002

== Television ==
- "Madrigal" (Breaking Bad), an episode of Breaking Bad, featuring Madrigal Electromotive, a fictitious multinational conglomerate

== People ==
Madrigal is also used as a Spanish surname that refers to:

- Al Madrigal (born 1971), American stand-up comedian and actor of Mexican descent
- Alexander Madrigal (born 1972), Costa Rican-Mexican footballer
- Alexis Madrigal, an American journalist
- Diego Madrigal (born 1989), Costa Rican football striker
- Jamby Madrigal (born 1958), Filipina politician and senator
- Junior Félix Madrigal (born 1982), Mexican football goalkeeper
- Liliana Madrigal (born 1957), Costa Rican conservationist
- Michelle Madrigal (born 1986), Filipina actress
- Nick Madrigal (born 1997), American baseball player
- Roger Madrigal (born 1972), Costa Rican slalom canoer
- Warner Madrigal (born 1984), Major League Baseball relief pitcher
- Warren Madrigal (born 2004), Costa Rican footballer

== Places ==
- Madrigal de las Altas Torres, a municipality in Ávila, Castile and León, Spain
- Madrigal del Monte, a municipality in Burgos, Castile and León, Spain
- Estadio El Madrigal, a stadium in Villarreal, Spain

== Other uses ==
- Madrigal Audio Laboratories, an American company (closed in 2002)
