= La Petite République =

Former French newspaper

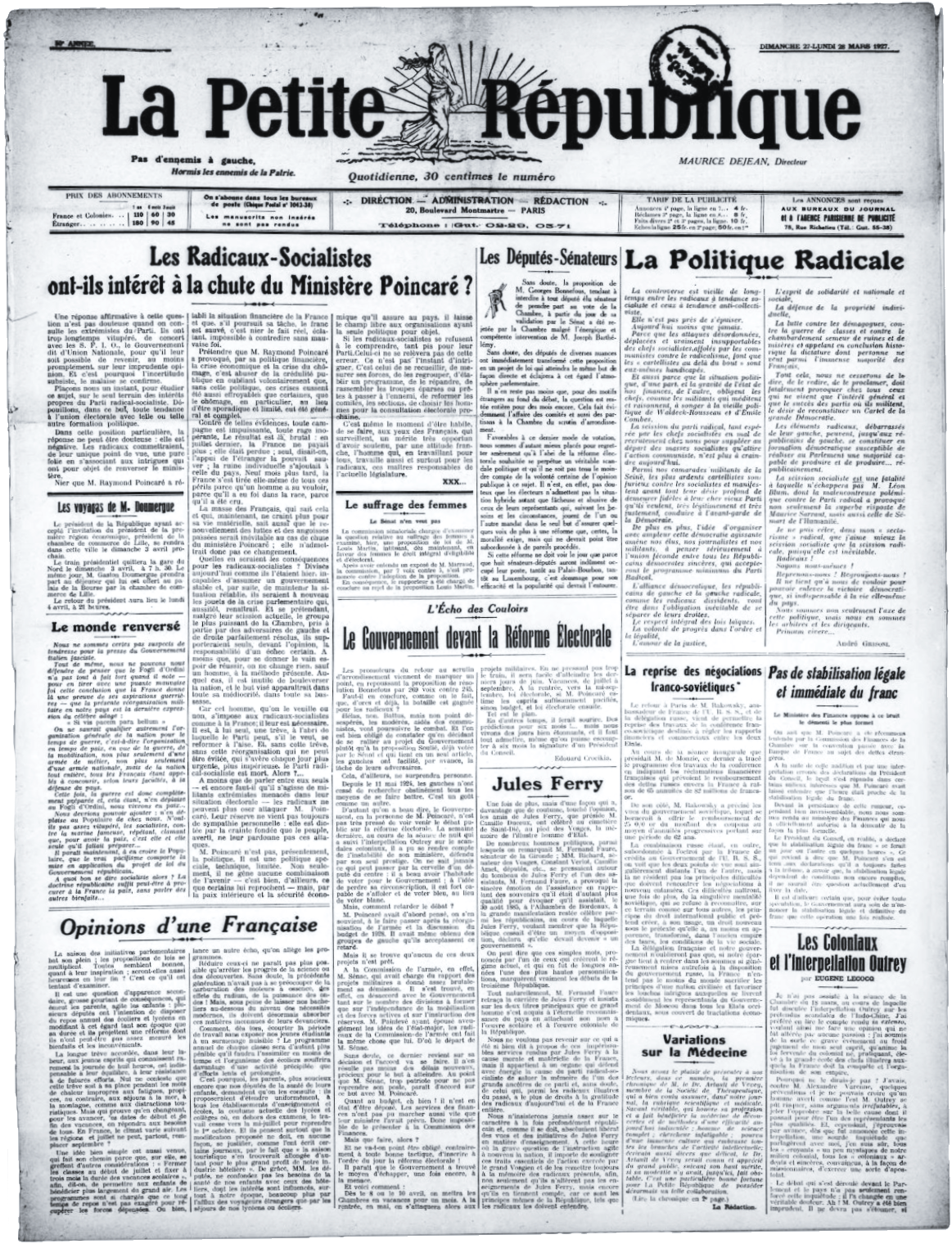
27-28 March 1927 issue.

La Petite République (The Little Republic) or La Petite République française (The Little French Republic) was a daily French newspaper founded by Alphonse Péphau and published from 12 April 1876 to 1 January 1938. It was renamed La Petite République socialiste (The Little Socialist Republic) in 1898.

== History ==
La Petite République was initially a popular daily newspaper of republican views, linked to La République française set up by Léon Gambetta. It was born during the craze for the 'petite press' (newspapers costing only one sou) of the République du Croissant. It was owned by a société anonyme with 500 francs each. Its circulation briefly peaked at 150,000 and in October 1887 it published four editions a day.

It was put into liquidation in 1891 but revived the following year by the Société nouvelle de la Petite République française. 27-year-old journalist Henri Turot, future socialist deputy and founder of the Agence Radio, in effect decided to buy it with help from his former fellow-students at the collège Stanislas, Marcel Sembat and Henri Pellier. Together they made it the first daily French newspaper to represent all socialist camps and opinions. Dembat remained editor until 19 July 1893, when he was succeeded by socialist Alexandre Millerand.

On 16 January 1892 it published its support for Jean Jaurès in his campaign to be elected deputy for Carmaux. In a prophetic article in the newspaper on 17 May 1896, Jaurès warned that "great wars can arise at any moment from colonial complications and competition".

From 1893 to 1903 it was edited by Millerand, then Jules Guesde, then Alfred Léon Gérault-Richard and finally Jaurès himself. At that time and until Jaurès set up L’Humanité it was the main French socialist daily newspaper.

After the 1898 French legislative election Jaurès gave up politics and devoted himself entirely to journalism, becoming co-director of La Petite République. Through his articles it supported the cabinet of Waldeck Rousseau, which included Millerand as Minister for Trade and Industry. The newspaper gained strong notoriety for publishing les Preuves (the Proofs), a series of articles on the Dreyfus affair, under Jaurès's signature.
