= Compagnie minière de Carmaux =

French coal mining company

Coordinates: 44.021104°N 2.144211°E

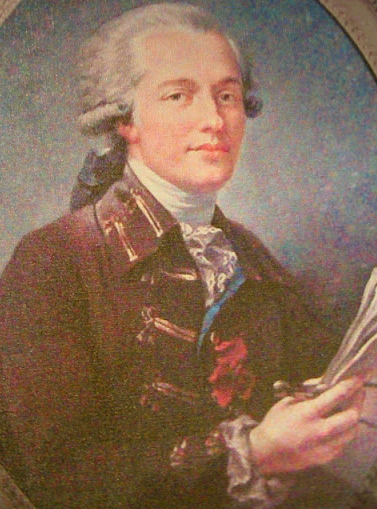
- Gabriel de Solages, founder of the enterprise
- Industry: Coal mining
- Genre: Mines
- Founded: September 12, 1752; 274 years ago in Carmaux, Tarn, France
- Founder: Gabriel de Solages
- Headquarters: France

The Compagnie minière de Carmaux (Carmaux Mining Company), or Société des mines de Carmaux, was one of the first coal mining companies in France. It was founded in 1752 in the isolated Carmaux basin. The company was at first slow to expand and modernize, but grew much faster after the introduction of a railway connection in the 1850s. A strike in 1892 drew national attention and had an important impact on French labour relations. By 1900 there were almost 3,500 miners and 500,000 tons of coal were produced each year. Demands increased with the two world wars of the 20th century, and foreign miners were brought in to compensate for shortage of French laborers. The company was nationalized in 1946.

== Background ==
Location in France

The Carmaux-Albi coal basin is in the Tarn department in the south of France between the towns of Carmaux in the north and Albi in the south. A railway line connects these two towns, and extends from Carmaux eastward to Rodez and from Albi westward to Toulouse. The Carmaux coalfield is oriented north-south with a length of 6 kilometres (3.7 mi) and a width of 800–2,600 metres (2,600–8,500 ft). It has 11 veins of coal ranging from 2–8 metres (6 ft 7 in – 26 ft 3 in) in thickness. There are about 14 metres (46 ft) of high quality coal, 14 metres (46 ft) of medium quality and 11 metres (36 ft) of low quality. The smaller Albi coalfield to the south is about 2,400 by 2,000 metres (7,900 by 6,600 ft), with 17 to 24 metres (56 to 79 ft) of coal. The two coalfields are fractured with many faults of up to 100 metres (330 ft). The northern part of the Albi coalfield, which centers on Cagnac-les-Mines, is in the Carmaux mining concession.

Documents in the archives of Albi record that in 1245 the tolls on the Tarn bridge included one denier per donkey-load of coal. At that time the coal was collected along the Cérou river, where the coal is very close to the surface. The local people made surface excavations, which they called "caves". From the start of the 16th century they dug pits, but these were not very deep since the water table was close to the surface. Random and unregulated coal mining was undertaken by the landowners until the 18th century. By then coal was starting to be widely used in Europe. On 14 January 1744 a regulation was issued by the council of state that prohibited operating a mine without first obtaining a concession. The regulation confirmed that the king had full ownership of the subsoil of France, and that the mine operators were responsible for safety and for the working conditions of miners.

== Early years ==
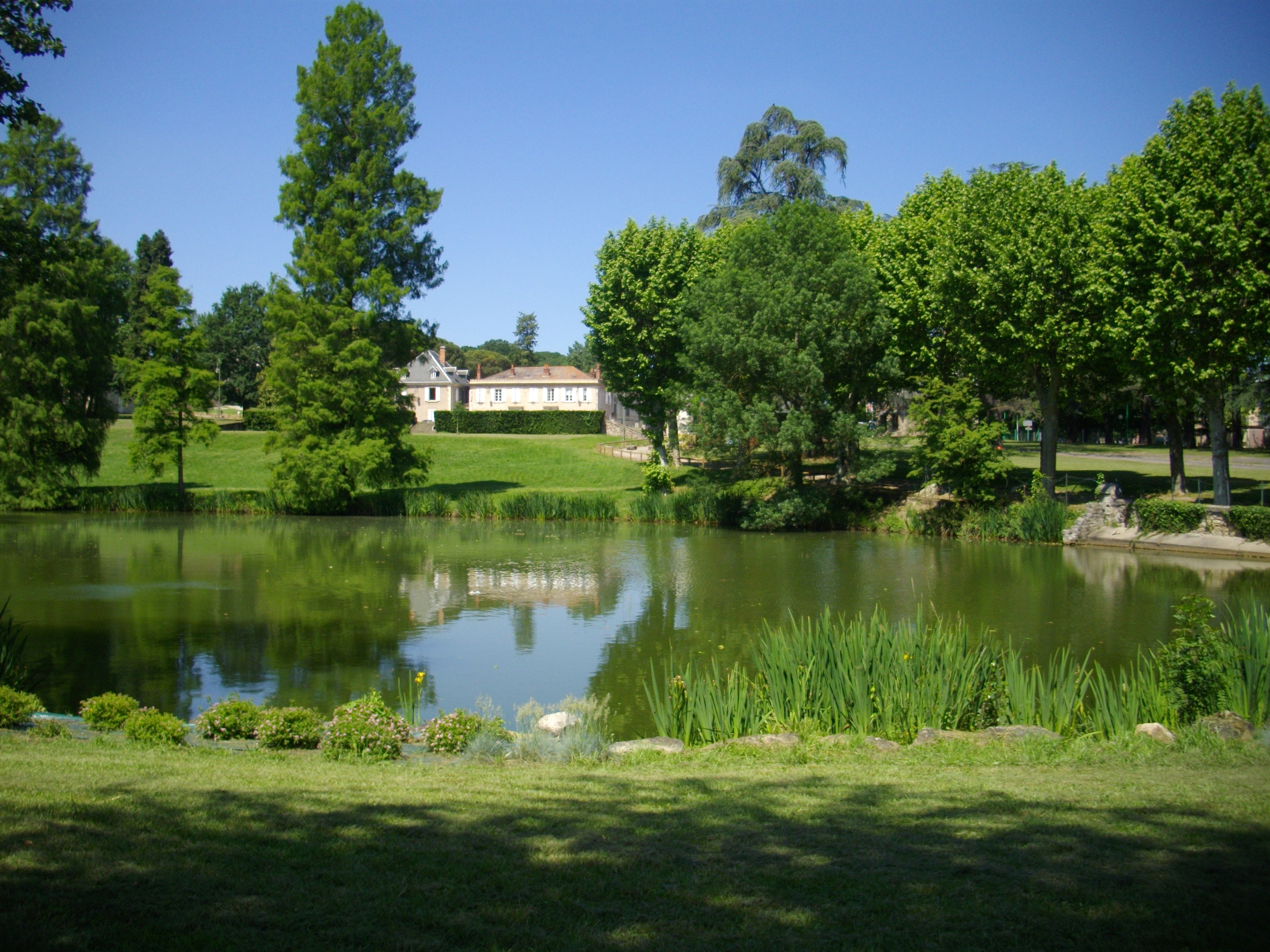
Domaine de la verrerie (glassworks park), Château des De Solages, Carmaux

In 1749 Gabriel de Solages (Note: The Solages family is mentioned in documents from 1028. In 1724 they gained large landholdings in Carmaux by marriage.) became involved in mining. He had followed a military career until 1749, when his brother, the marquis de Carmaux, gave him the rights to the coal mines he owned in the area. Gabriel was intelligent and energetic. At this time industry was developing in France and was looking for coal as an alternative to increasingly scarce wood. In 1752 Gabriel de Solages received a concession for mining within a radius of one league around his Blaye château. The mining rights would remain in the Solages family until they were nationalized in 1947. In 1754 Gabriel installed a glass bottle factory near his château fueled by the coal.

Gabriel de Solages invited Flemish miners to work his mines, but also employed local people. Until 1914 miners were mostly recruited from local peasantry. Typically the eldest son in a family would inherit the farm, while the younger sons would receive money which they would use to buy a small plot to grow vegetables while working in the mines. Solages was able to operate without competition, and was not forced to close the mines in 1789 when the French Revolution began. At that time he was employing 100 workers. He was arrested in 1793 and his mines were placed under sequestration. A decree by the Committee of Public Safety of 24 Frimaire year III (13 December 1794) restored the lands and defined the limits of the 8,800 hectares (22,000 acres) concession. The concession was renewed by his son François-Gabriel de Solages on 27 Pluviôse year IX (16 février 1801). The limits remained unchanged into the 20th century.

Under Napoleon, in 1810 mining concessions became perpetual properties that could be sold and inherited. In 1810 the de Solages family established the Compagnie des Mines et Verreries de Carmaux to exploit the mines and glassworks. There was a boom in demand for coal to fuel metal foundries for the manufacture of weapons during the Napoleonic Wars. There were 100 miners at that time, of whom half worked underground, but they still had to work the land to support themselves. The first steam engine was introduced in 1811.

In the first half of the 19th century 20,000 to 30,000 tons of coal per year were extracted. There were 189 miners in 1822 and 270 in 1832. Their wages and working conditions slowly improved, but technical progress was slow. The coal basin was isolated, and road transport was expensive and unreliable. Oak timber used to support the sides and roofs of the galleries was found to decay quickly from dry rot. An experiment with acacia wood reported in 1836 found it was much more durable in the same situation, unaffected after four years except at the sap-wood surface.

== Later 19th century ==
=== Growth ===
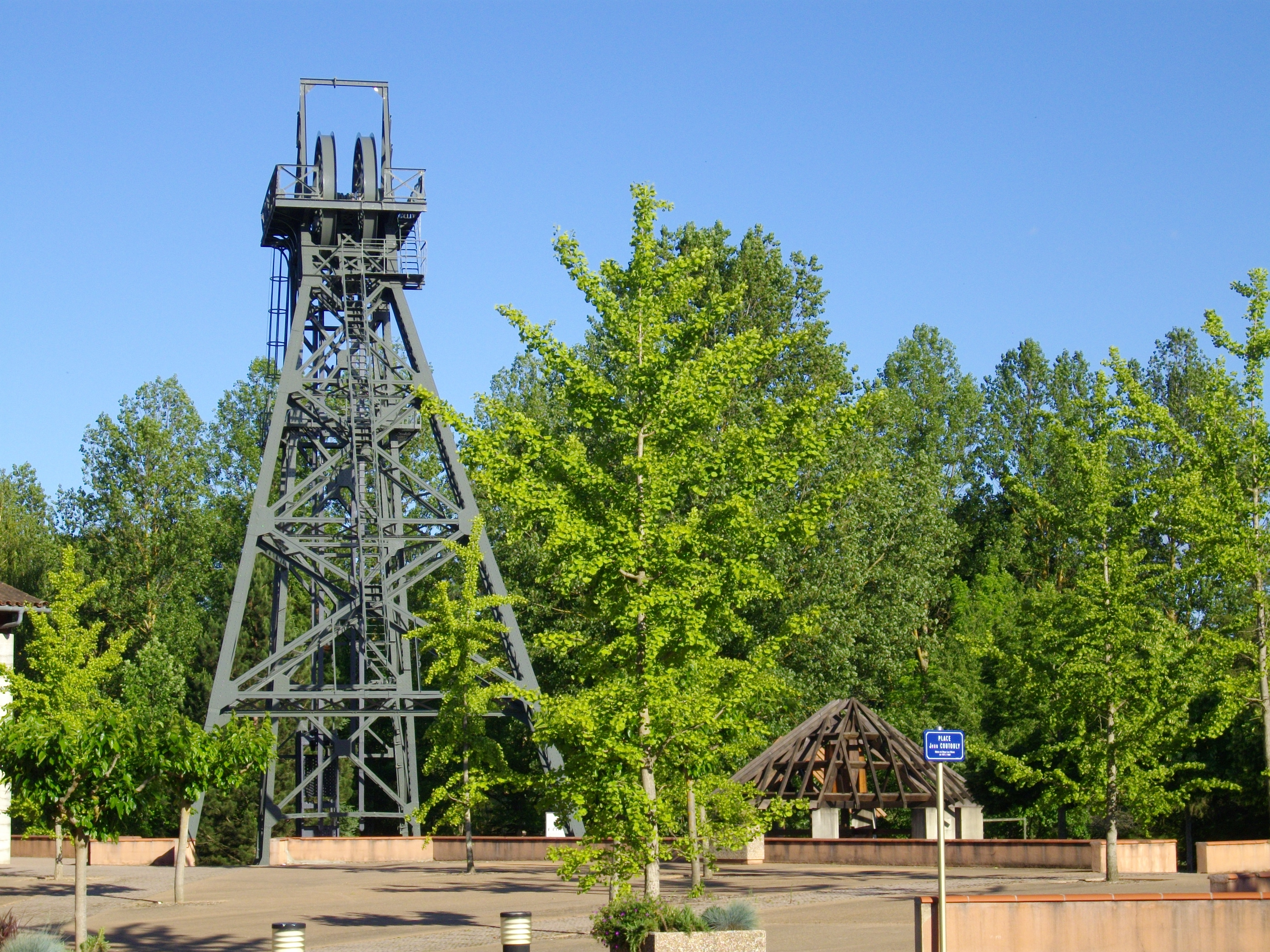
Minehead in Blaye-les-Mines

In 1854 an imperial decree granted the Solages company a concession to build a railway connecting Carmaux to Albi at its own expense. In 1856 the enterprise became a limited company, the Compagnie des Houillères et Chemins de Fer de Carmaux Toulouse (Carmaux Toulouse Coal Mine and Railways company). The line opened in 1857 and allowed transport of coal via other railways established soon after that linked to the large networks. The Carmaux Mining Company was almost destroyed in the 1850s during the speculation over the Grand Central Railroad. In 1862 it was relaunched as a société anonyme with new capital and Baron René Reille as the representative on the board of the Compagnie du chemin de fer de Paris à Orléans. Reille was chairman from 1884 to 1898.

The company was reorganized as the Société des Mines de Carmaux (SMC) in 1873, having sold the glass works and railway. In the 1870s and 1880s the company upgraded its equipment and built a plant to make coal briquettes for use by locomotives and steamships. Output rose to more than 475,000 tons per year in the last quarter of the century. In 1880 it employed 729 workers. By 1892 there were 2,000 workers.

In 1885 the Albi coalfield was discovered, with deposits outside the Carmaux concession. The La Société des Mines Albi was established in 1886 to exploit the new field, and employed 1,000 workers by 1900. The railways allowed the coal to be carried to new markets, and production from the Carmaux concession increased to 300,000 tons in 1880 and 500,000 tons in 1890.

=== Labour conditions and unrest ===
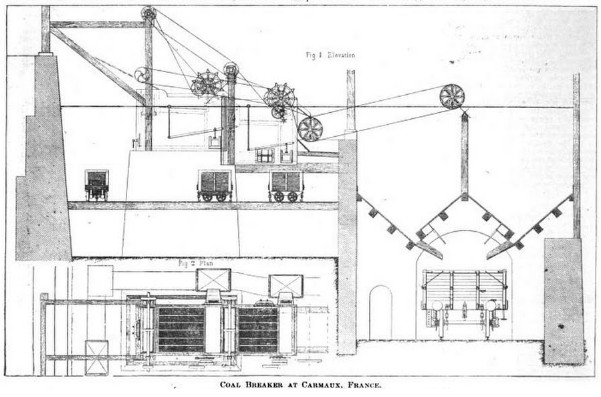
Coal breaker at Carmaux 1889

From the second half of the 19th century wages were relatively high and the miners could even enjoy retirement after their working career. The pay of the miners in the second half of the 19th century increased, but not as fast as the profits to the owners. Working conditions were poor, with workers suffering from explosions, suffocation, anaemia and tuberculosis. They were thrown out of work during periods of low demand. Between 1880 and 1892 thirty six men died in the Carmaux mines. It took time for the farm laborers to adapt to mining, where they were expected to work regular hours, work hard and accept the discipline of the company. They became proletarians rather than peasants, learned to buy on credit, and became discontented with the political structure.

During the 19th century industrial revolution the miners organized themselves and fought for shorter working hours, higher wages, improved safety and social insurance. A strike in 1883 failed, but when the law of 1884 made it legal the Carmaux workers formed a union. Marcelle Auclair wrote in 1954 that towards the end of the 19th century the Carmaux workers were starting to say, "Without Carmaux, where would the Solages clan be?" On 28 November 1886 the deputy Charles Emile Wickersheimer (1849–1915) attacked the 1810 mining law, saying "The State has no right to commit future generations; to say that mining property is property like any other is an obvious mistake." On 19 November 1889 several left-wing deputies proposed nationalization, and demands for nationalization or regulation grew as the number of miners strikes grew.

Baron René Reille (1835–1898) was a member of the Comité des houillères, the coal mine owners' association, and president of the board of directors of the Compagnie minière de Carmaux. Reille was the father-in-law of the Marquis de Solages. His opponents called him the "King of the Black Mountain." In the election of 22 September 1889 Reille was elected for the 2nd district of Castres, presenting himself as a "resolute conservative and a sincere Catholic." In the election the Reille-Solages industrialists and the clergy opposed the Republican deputy Jean Jaurès (1859–1914), who was defeated by Reille. Jaurès wrote that the Marquis de Solages had won election in the Carmaux constituency by implying to the workers that their jobs depended on his victory. When Solages joined the board of directors of the glass factory, Jaurès implied that the glass workers would also come under the control of the Reille-Solages group.

=== 1892 strike ===
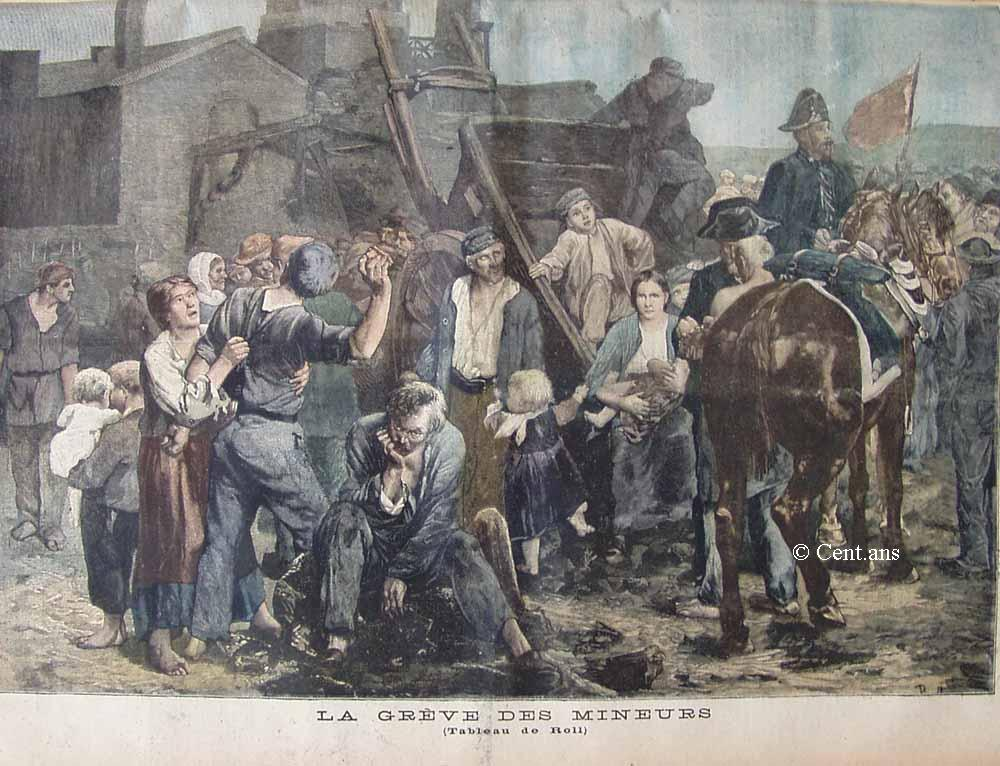
Illustration of the 1892 strike by Alfred Philippe Roll, Le Petit Journal, 1 October 1892

Jean Jaurès played a leading role in the Carmaux miners strike of 1892, and the glass workers strike that followed in 1895. A strike almost began in early 1892, mainly over demands for wage improvements, but was defused by mediation. Later that year there was a strike for political reasons. The militant socialist Jean-Baptiste Calvignac, (Note: Jean-Baptiste Calvignac (1854-1934) was born in Carmaux, son of a smallholder who had become a miner. He became a metal worker in the mining company and helped organize the Carmaux mining union in 1883. He participated in miners' strikes in 1891 and 1892. He was elected honorary president of the national federation of miners created in 1892, which he helped organize.) one of the miners' union leaders, was elected mayor of Carmaux. The company would not give him time to perform this job, and when Calvignac simply took the time he needed he was fired on 2 August 1892. The workers claimed that the company was attacking their right of suffrage, while the company said a worker must do his job or be fired. The miners held a stormy meeting on 15 August 1892. The strike began the next day and would drag out for ten weeks.

The moderate Republican paper Le Temps supported the company, noting that many small merchants and professionals accepted economic loss when they accepted public office. An editorial said that although Calvignac had the right to become mayor, the company had the right to sack him. Jaurès wrote in La Depeche de Toulouse deriding the company's statement that it was impossible to grant the mayor two days a week to discharge his political duties,

Impossible? The entire issue is concentrated there. For if the company was unable to grant just two free days a week to a worker elected mayor by universal suffrage, it was because it consciously sought to destroy the effectiveness of the popular vote; it thus struck a blow at universal suffrage; and by making a mockery of the ballot, it criminally provoked the workers to violence. ... At Carmaux there are 2,000 miners, and Baron Reille who governs them doesn't even know them by sight. He lives in Paris during the winter and in Saint-Amans in the summer. . . . The workers of Carmaux are merely so many coins for him, accumulating in his cash-drawer.

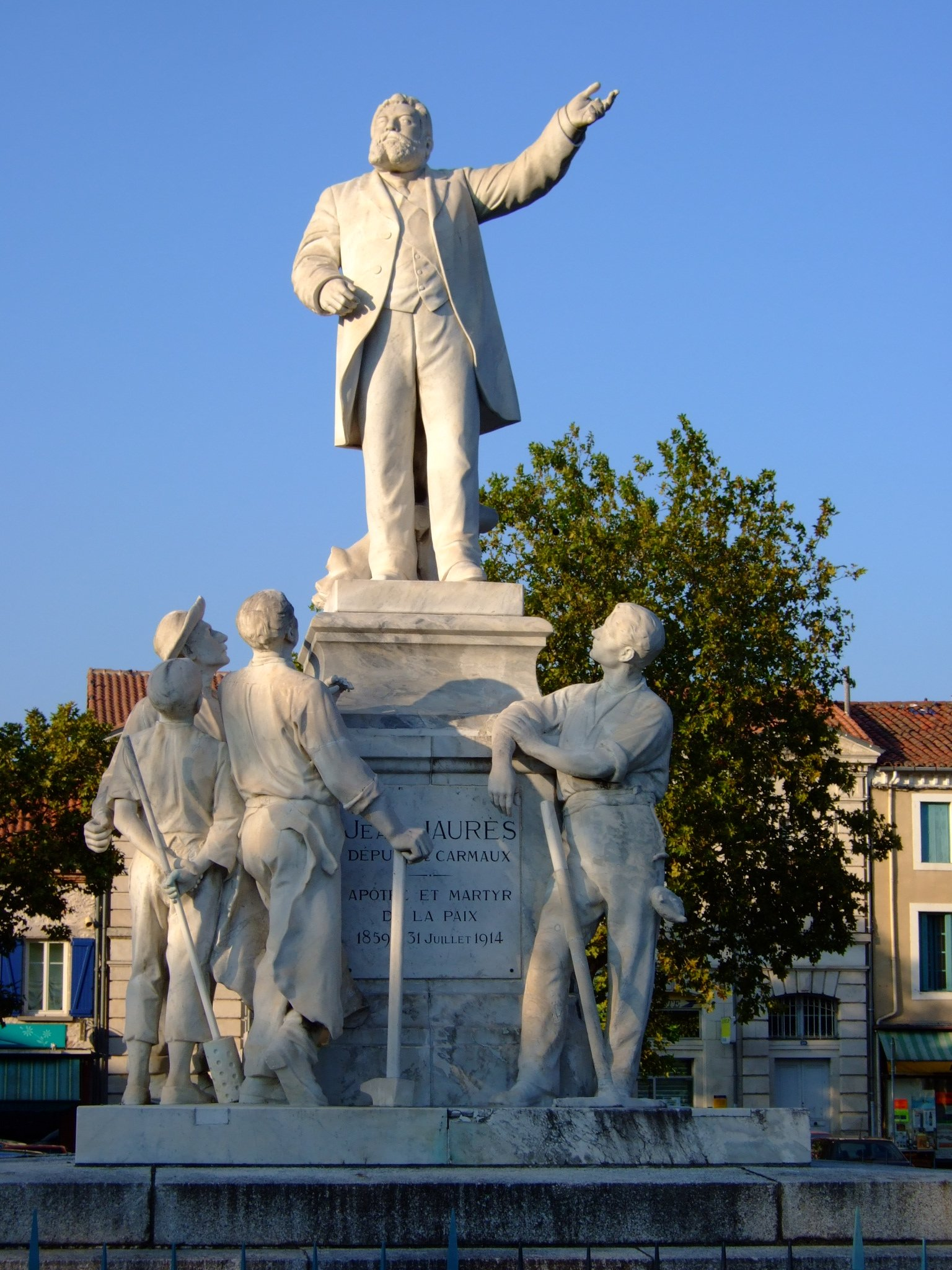
Statue of Jean Jaurès and miners in the Place Jean Jaurès in Carmaux

By mid-September Jaurès was writing that the company was breaking the law that made intimidating an elector by threat of dismissal from employment a criminal offense. As the strike dragged on the miners suffered from hunger, while strikebreakers and troops to protect them arrived. The company may have sponsored agents provocateurs to encourage violent acts that would discredit the miners. The strike of the Carmaux miners in 1892 had national impact. The Quarterly Register of Current History reported that the strike had surpassed all other labor movements of the quarter in interest. Collections were organized to support the miners, whose determination, solidarity and discipline was widely admired by ordinary people. The politicians Duc-Quercy, Pierre Baudin, Alexandre Millerand, René Viviani, and Alfred Léon Gérault-Richard often spoke in Carmaux during the strike. Jean Jaurès, Duc-Quercy and Eugène Baudin said the strike was an attempt to guarantee the political liberties of Carmaux voters. Paul Lafargue of the French Workers' Party saw it as part of the wider "political and economic battle against the bourgeoisie".

On 18 October 1892 Millerand and Baudin attacked Reille in the Chamber of Deputies, accusing him of prolonging the strike to punish the workers by starvation. Millerand moved that the government should seize the mines. In response, Reille finally agreed to arbitration. The prime minister, Émile Loubet, agreed to act as arbitrator. His decision was announced on 26 October. Calvignac would be reemployed, and given leave of absence for his term as mayor. All strikers would be reinstated apart from those convicted of rioting. The company manager Humblot would retain his position. Calvignac was one of the workers' delegates in the arbitration procedure.

Georges Clemenceau and others objected on the grounds that the decision was too favorable to the company. Clemenceau went to Carmaux and arranged a compromise where Humblot would be moved to another mine and the convicted strikers would be released and given work. The compromise decision was issued on 30 October 1892. This was accepted by the miners, who returned to work on 3 November 1892.

=== Later events ===
The events of the strike inspired the anarchist Émile Henry to violence. On 8 November 1892 he placed a bomb at the offices of the Carmaux Mining Company in Paris. The bomb killed five police officers after it was discovered and transported to a police station. The Illustrated American called the bomb incident "another example of to what lengths the French workingmen, and indeed the workingmen of other countries, will go, when they make preposterous demands of their employers and are denied them." Solages had resigned his seat as a deputy on 14 October 1892, and in January 1893 Jaurès won the resulting by-election on the Marxist Parti ouvrier français platform. The miners' union was dissolved by the authorities in 1898, and a new union was formed in April 1899.

== 20th century ==
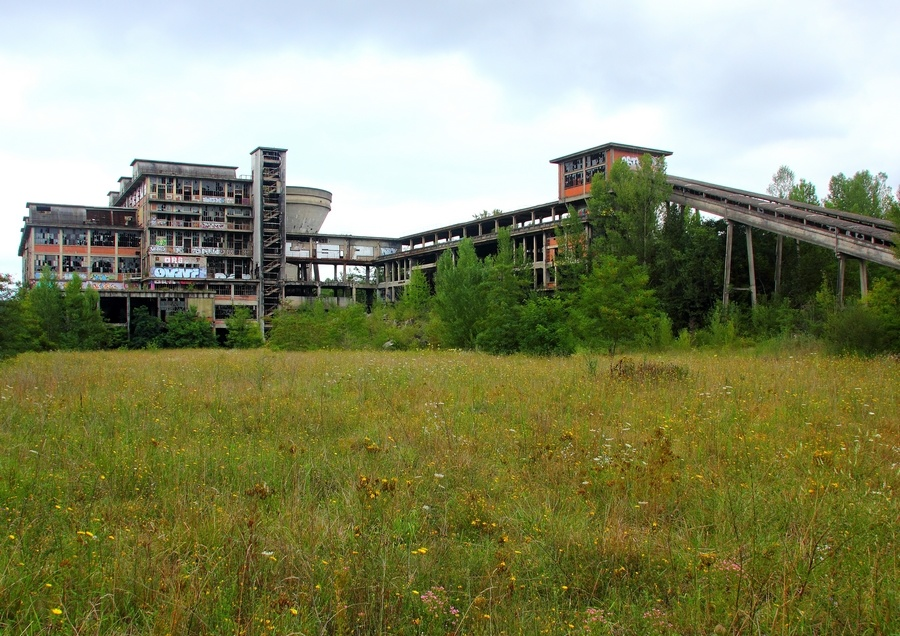
Industrial structure in Blaye-les-Mines

By 1900 there were almost 3,500 miners and 500,000 tons of coal production. From 1900 to 1914 the Société des Mines de Carmaux modernized its equipment and methods. It introduced electric traction by trolley, mechanical haulage, hydraulic backfilling, electrification at the bottom favored by the absence of flammable firedamp. At the same time organization of labour improved, the company searched for new outlets and adapted its products to commercial needs. From 1908 to 1913 production of coal was around 600,000 tons per year. During World War I (1914–18) output rose to 819,000 tons in 1917 and 845,000 tons in 1918.

Production dropped immediately after the war, but had rebounded to 674,000 tons in 1923, 706,000 tons in 1924 and 751,000 tons in 1925. The expansion was due in part to employment of foreign labour, and in part to introduction of mechanized hammers and drills. At the end of 1925 the Carmaux mines employed 4,106 workers, of whom 2,955 were French, 356 Spanish, 333 Polish, 122 Italian and 56 of various other nationalities.

After World War II (1939–45) France had to rebuild itself and launched a program to produce more coal. SMC was requisitioned from the Solages family and became the Houillères de Carmaux concession. After the mines were nationalized in 1946 it was integrated into the Houillères du Bassin d'Aquitaine, then in 1969 into the Houillères de Bassin du Centre et du Midi.

The last mine closed in 1997. The 650 hectares (1,600 acres) St Marie Mine at Blaye-les-Mines became an adventure park, opened in 2003. It includes a display of huge machines used in open-cast mining after the nationalization. There is a mining museum at Cagnac-les-Mines, 10 km south of Carmaux. It includes a show mine opened in 2005 that lets visitors go 350 metres (1,150 ft) underground, a site on the European Route of Industrial Heritage.

== Sources ==
- "Anarchism in Paris", The Illustrated American, Illustrated American Publishing Company, 1892
- Chaliand, Gérard; Blin, Arnaud (2007), The History of Terrorism: From Antiquity to Al Qaeda, University of California Press, ISBN 978-0-520-24709-3
- "European Labor Interests", The Quarterly Register of Current History, Evening News Association, 1893
- "Durability of Acacia Wood", Mechanics' Magazine, and Journal of the Mechanics' Institute, D. K. Minor, 1836
- Goldberg, Harvey (1958), "Jaurès and the Carmaux Strikes: The Coal Strike of 1892", The American Journal of Economics and Sociology, 17 (2): 167–178, doi:10.1111/j.1536-7150.1958.tb00239.x, JSTOR 3484674
- Goldberg, Harvey (1962), The Life of Jean Jaurès, Univ of Wisconsin Press, ISBN 978-0-299-02564-9
- Jolly, Jean (1960–77), "René, Charles Reille-Soult-Dalmatie", Dictionnaire des parlementaires francais de 1889 a 1940 (in French)
- Lane, A. Thomas (1995), Biographical Dictionary of European Labor Leaders, Greenwood Publishing Group, ISBN 978-0-313-26456-6
- Magali Della Sudda, "De la dame d'oeuvre à la militante d'action sociale...", Musea (in French)
- Mayeur, Jean-Marie; Rebirioux, Madeleine (1987), The Third Republic from Its Origins to the Great War, 1871-1914, Cambridge University Press, ISBN 978-0-521-35857-6
- Merriman, John M. (2016-03-01), The Dynamite Club: How a Bombing in Fin-de-Siècle Paris Ignited the Age of Modern Terror, Yale University Press, ISBN 978-0-300-21793-3
- "Mining Museum", ERIH: European Route of Industrial Heritage
- Monnié, A. (1929), "Le bassin houiller de Carmaux-Albi" (PDF), Annales de Géographie (in French), 38 (216): 577–586, doi:10.3406/geo.1929.9935
- Patrimoine minier (in French), Mairie de Carmaux
- Scott, Joan Wallach (1974), The Glassworkers of Carmaux: French Craftsmen and Political Action in a Nineteenth-century City, Harvard University Press, ISBN 978-0-674-35440-1
- Smith, Michael Stephen (2006), The Emergence of Modern Business Enterprise in France, 1800-1930, Harvard University Press, ISBN 978-0-674-01939-3
