= Charles-Ernest Paulmier =

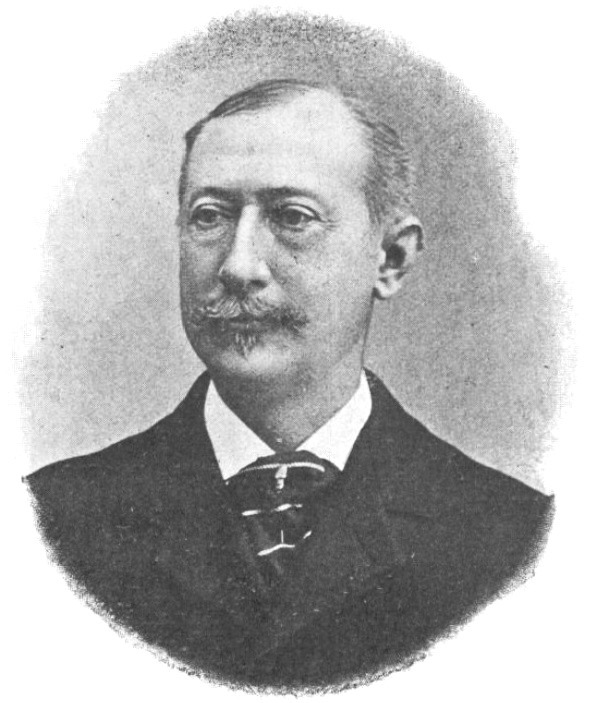

Charles-Ernest Paulmier (2 April 1848 – 22 August 1907) was a French politician.

== Life ==
=== Early life ===
He was born in Caen to lawyer and member of parliament Charles-Pierre-Paul Paulmier. Charles-Ernest Paulmier fought in the Franco-Prussian War in 1870, notably in the defence of Dreux, as an officer in a battalion of the Mobile National Guard. After studying law in Paris he became a lawyer in 1871 and practised at the Paris bar until 1878, when he returned to Calvados for a political career like his father.

=== Political career ===
He began as counsellor for the arrondissement of Falaise in 1874 before becoming mayor of Bretteville-sur-Laize the following year, holding the latter post until 1893, when he gained a seat on Calvados' council-general for the canton of Bretteville-sur-Laize (earlier held by his father). Paumier was then a Bonapartist monarchist 'conservateur'.

He failed to get elected for Falaise in the 1881 French legislative election against its republican mayor Esnault), but did get elected as a conservative deputy during the 1885 French legislative election, alongside the Bonapartist Jules Delafosse and Pierre-Louis de Colbert-Laplace, the legitimist Gontran de Cornulier, the Orleanist Henri Gérard and Désiré Desloges. He sat with the right in the Chamber of Deputies and in January 1899 joined the Ligue de la patrie française.

He was reelected for Falaise in 1889, 1893, 1898, 1902 and 1906, mainly defending the interests of farmers and animal breeders, especially horse-breeders, fighting for protectionist customs taxes on cereals, protecting the privileges of eau-de-vie brewers and supporting the reestablishment of parimutuel betting (opposing the government on the subject in 1891). He was secretary to the agricultural group in the chamber of deputies during the 1893-1898 legislature.

He also opposed the Moderate Republicans and backed schools not run by the church. For a time he supported Boulangism, with whom he shared a belief in the claim of a strong executive power issuing from universal direct suffrage, before joining the Ralliement in 1889. He was labelled a "revisionist" in 1889, a "rallié" or "liberal conservative" in 1893 and a "liberal republican" in 1898 and also belonged to the republican right group in 1892 then the ALP group founded in 1901. As an antidreyfusard he also belonged to the republican nationalist group formed in 1902.

=== Sportsman and duellist ===
A noted sportsman, Paulmier fenced, rode horses and bicycles, and drove cars (he was a friend of count Albert de Dion, cofounder of De Dion-Bouton). A renowned duellist and student of Jules Jacob then Albert Ayat, he wounded journalist Adrien Papillaud in the abdomen in a duel in 1894. He unsuccessfully tried to contract a duel with count Bertrand de Valon in 1897 over a private and secret quarrel which had originated the previous year in the "drame de La Lanterne".

=== The La Lanterne affair ===
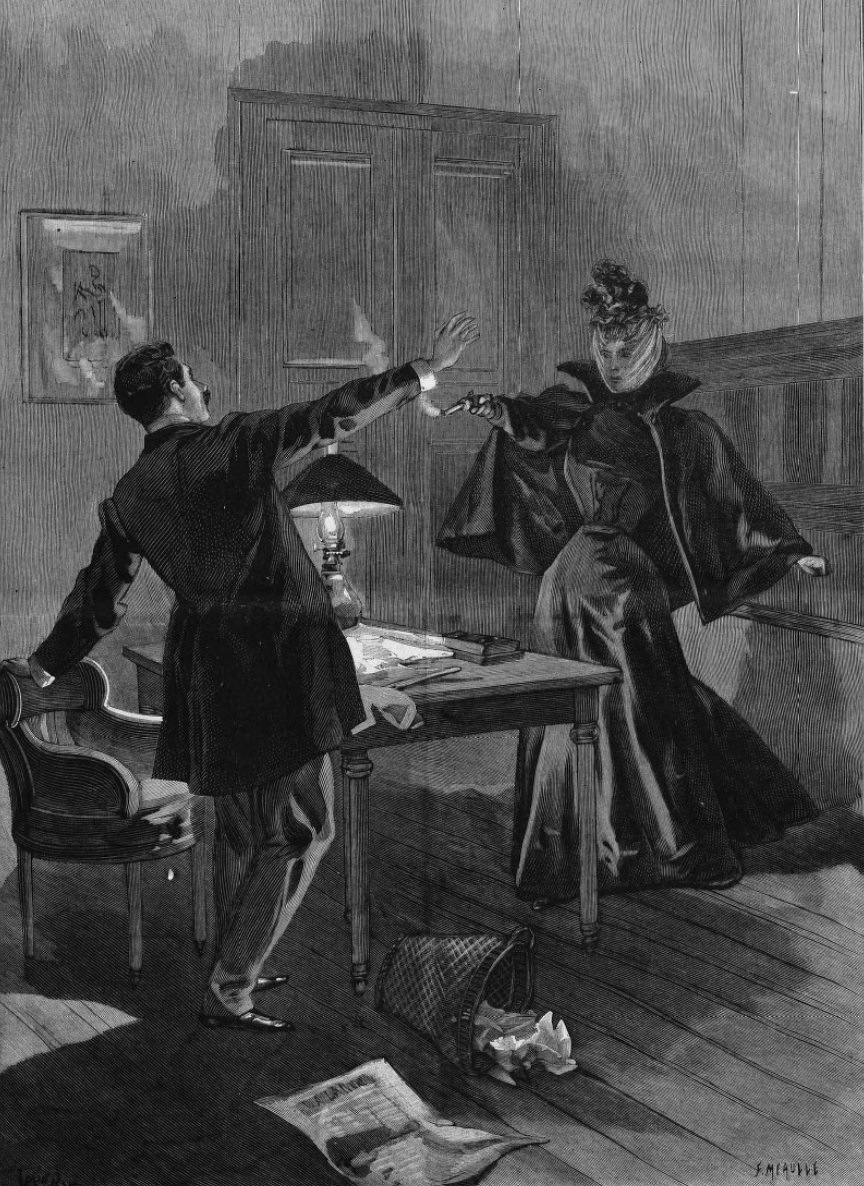
Un drame parisien, engraving by Méaulle in the Petit Journal's illustrated supplement.

On 20 September 1898, with the Dreyfus affair still dividing France, Paulmier wrote an open letter to the Minister of War Jules Chanoine demanding "that we apply the law against those who drag our military leaders through the mud". Faced with this antidreyfusard threat the journalist Henri Turot wrote a short article for La Lanterne under a pseudonym violently attacking Paulmier's private life. It was published on 24 September and insinuated that the dispute with the minister was due to Paulmier's wife being unfaithful.

Charles-Ernest was out of Paris visiting his constituency and so his wife took a revolver to the newspaper's office. Unable to meet the chief editor Alexandre Millerand, its editorial secretary Louis Olivier (1856-1923) met her instead. She shot him several times and badly wounded him, inciting deputy Émile Cère to make a failed attempt at modifying the 1881 law on the freedom of the press aimed at banning journalists from writing under pseudonyms.

On getting back to Paris Paulmier sent his seconds to Turot and (in the subsequent duel on 1 October in a shed owned by the comte de Dion at Puteaux) wounded him in the thigh. Meanwhile Paulmier's wife had been accused of attempted murder and on 26 December appeared before the Seine department cour d'assises. She was defended by Albert Danet and acquitted of all criminal charges by the jury, though forced to pay 15,000 expectation damages by the civil courts.

== Marriage and issue ==
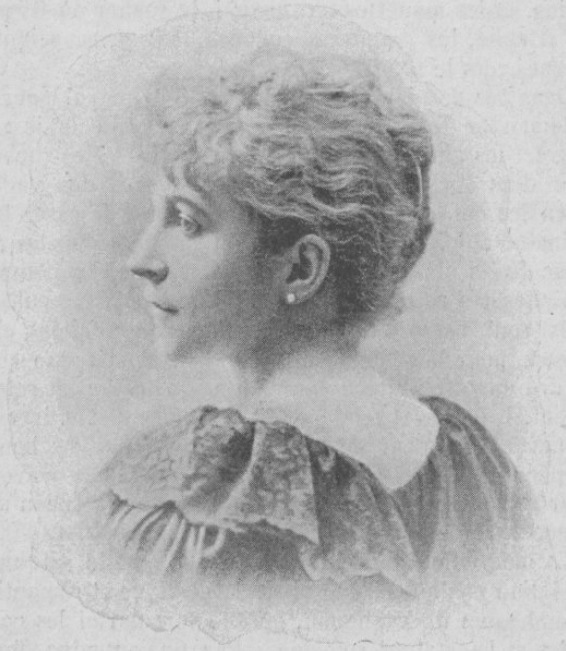
Valentine Paulmier, née Bouillant.

Paulmier married Valentine Bouillant (1858-1932), granddaughter of deputy Arsène Aumont-Thiéville and niece of editor Charles Delagrave. He owned the château de La Fresnaye, though the couple and their daughter Yvonne also lived in an apartment in the Villa Niel in Paris In 1908, a year after her husband's death from heart disease in Neuilly-sur-Seine, Valentine married Albert de Dion, who was admitted to the Legion of Honour and awarded the Gold Epidemic Medal in 1921, both for his philanthropy and establishment of a benevolent hospital during the First World War.

Yvonne later became baroness of Marçay (by marrying Yvan de Marçay, son of Edgar-Charles-Omer de Marçay, former prefect of Corsica, in 1901) and lived on the la Baronnie estate in Douvres-la-Délivrande with her companion Agnès Aignan. In 1895 her portrait was painted by Paul César Helleu as Symphony in white, Yvonne Paulmier, whilst the composer Lao Silesu also dedicated his 1912 composition un peu d'amour to her.

== Bibliography (in French) ==
- « Charles-Ernest Paulmier », dans le Dictionnaire des parlementaires français (1889-1940), sous la direction de Jean Jolly, PUF, 1960
- Alphonse Bertrand, La Chambre des députés (1898-1902) : biographies des 581 députés, Paris, May, 1899, p. 67-69.
- Gustave Vapereau, Dictionnaire universel des contemporains, 6^{e} édition, Paris, Hachette, 1893, p. 1222.
- Adolphe Robert, Edgar Bourloton et Gaston Cougny (dir.), Dictionnaire des Parlementaires français (1789-1889), t. III (Lav-Pla), Paris, Bourloton, 1891, p. 562.
