= Henri Turot =

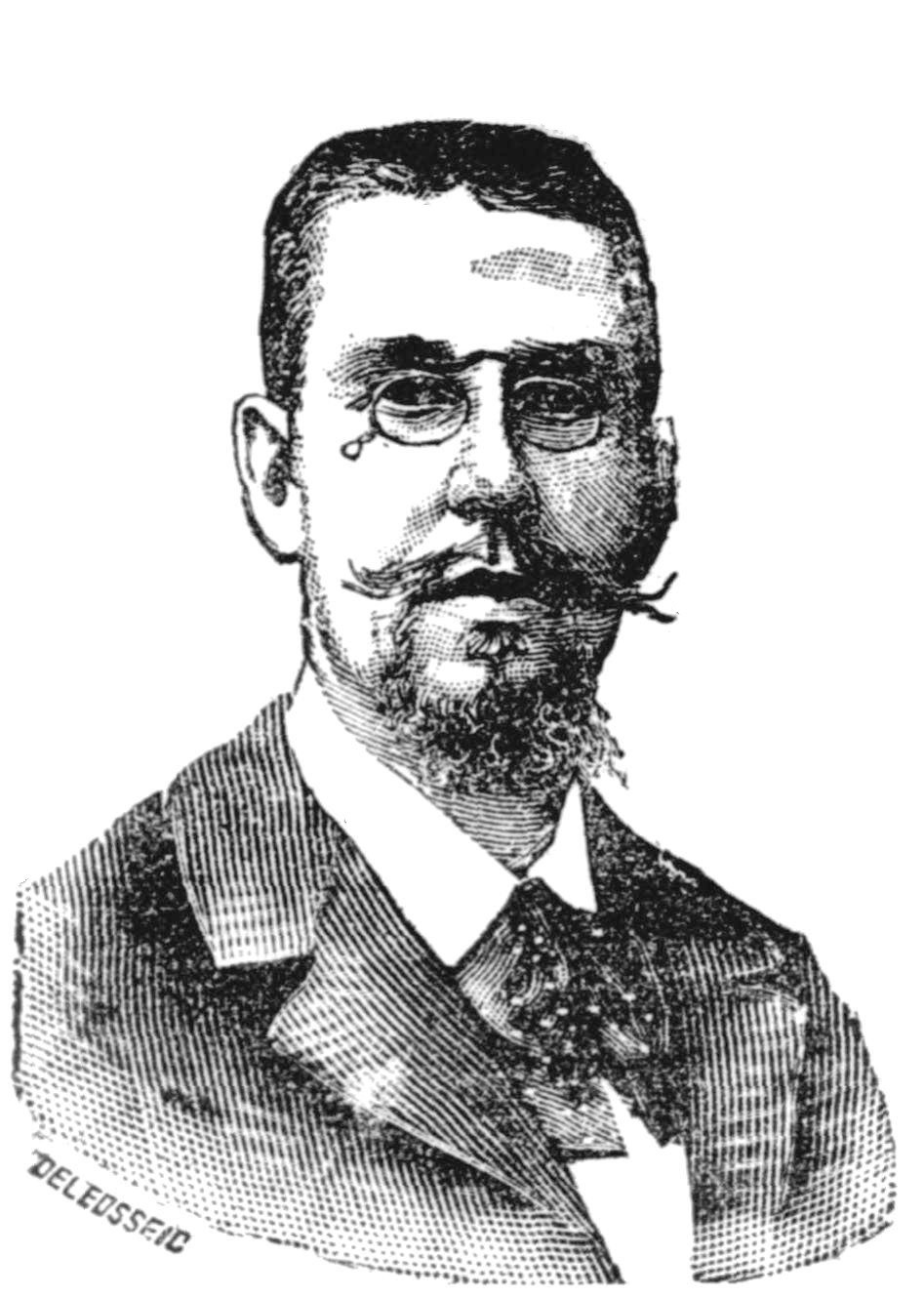
Turot in 1898.

Henri Turot (French: [ɑ̃ʁi tyʁo]; 24 February 1865 - 3 June 1920) was a French journalist and politician. He contributed to Journal and La Petite République as well as being a socialist deputy and municipal counsellor in Paris. Rue Henri-Turot in the 19th arrondissement of Paris is named after him.

== Life ==
He was born in Bar-sur-Aube and studied at the collège Stanislas alongside Marcel Sembat and Henri Pellier, with whom he bought La Petite République in 1892. Sembat became its editor until 19 July 1893 and was succeeded by Alexandre Millerand, who was also chief editor of La Lanterne, to which Turot also contributed. In autumn 1898, right in the middle of the Dreyfus affair, one article by the pro-Dreyfus Turot provoked an assassination attempt against the editorial secretary of La Lanterne and a duel between Turot and the anti-Dreyfus deputy Charles-Ernest Paulmier.

Turot was also an amateur photographer and took black and white shots of his 1899 trip by rickshaw, elephant, palanquin and train between Hanoi, Lạng Sơn and China as far as Lanzhou. French Indochina's governor general Paul Doumer also ordered him to meet marshal Sou to identify natural resources in the country and investigate whether or not factories could be set up there.

In 1901 Turot and Gaston Stiegler of Matin became emblems of self-promotional reporting on events such as car and bicycle races - they both bet on repeating and even beating the feat of Phileas Fogg in Around the World in Eighty Days. Turot was made one of the honorary members of the Société Nationale des Beaux Arts in 1913.

In 1904 he became involved in creating Agence Radio in Paris alongside Jean Galmot, Marius Gabion and Gabriel Astruc. Aristide Briand, Minister for Europe and Foreign Affairs, wished to bring Greece into the First World War on the side of the Entente and so introduced Turot to Basil Zaharoff, a rich Greek Venizelist arms dealer. Turot thus turned towards Greece and took over the first attempts launched by the director of École française Gustave Fougères and military advisor colonel Braquet to provide the friendly Greek press with articles on the causes of the war and Germany's responsibility for it, then to spread French propaganda in Greece.

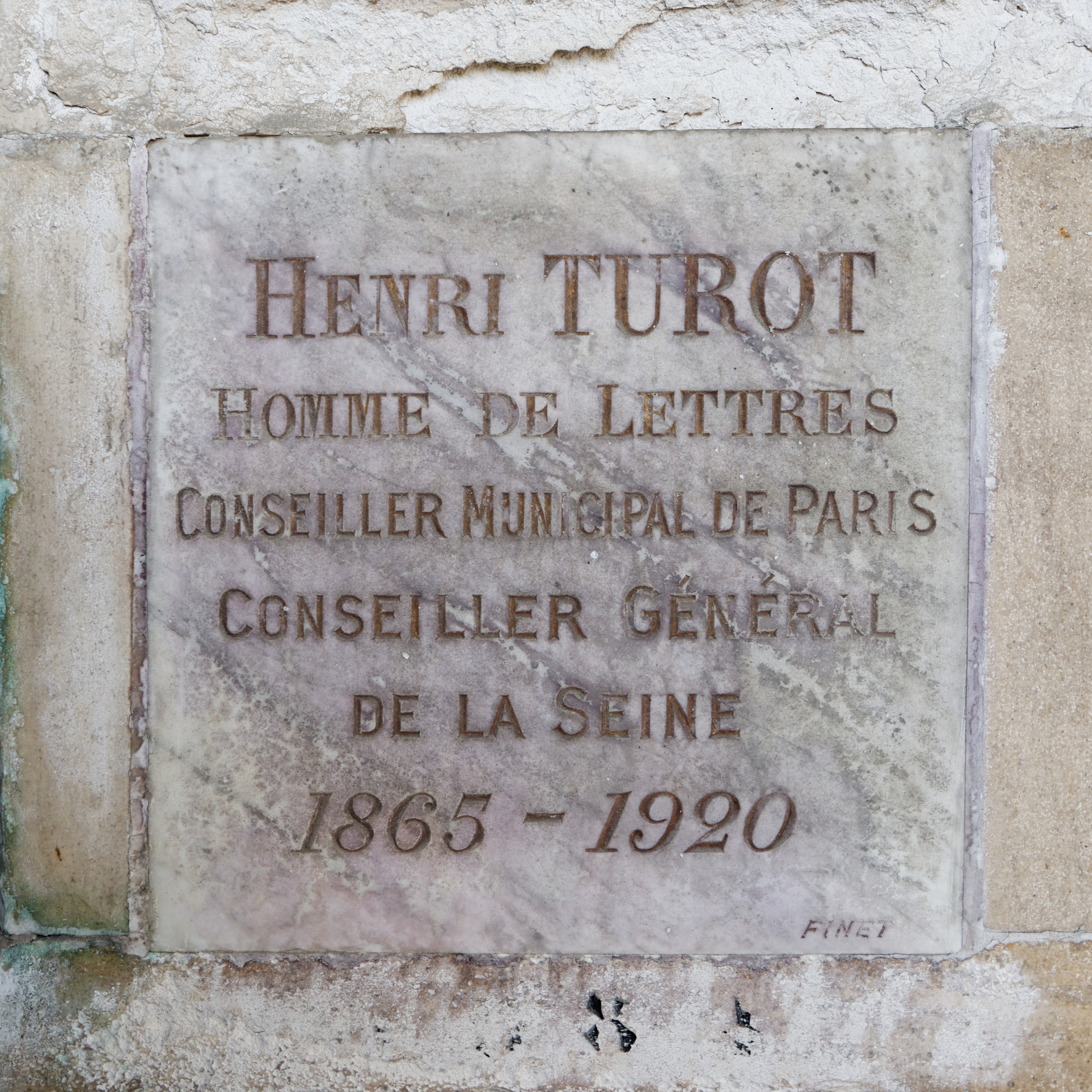
His columbarium plaque.

The Ministry sent Turot to Athens in December 1915 with a budget of 350,000 francs, with which he was able to start a collaboration between the French government and Elefthérios Venizélos to spread French propaganda in the Greek army and Greek press. Venizélos also set up a propaganda committee thanks to support from many rich supporters such as Zaharoff, but when he fell from power in November 1920 Zaharoff lost interest in Agence Radio, which was shored up for a while by Jean Galmot. Georges Clemenceau quickly became opposed to Zaharoff and felt Turot to be too pacifist, leading Agence Radio to fall under the control of the Agence Havas.

He died in the 16th arrondissement of Paris and his ashes are buried in the columbarium at Pere Lachaise Cemetery.

== Works ==
- En Amérique Latine, Vuibert et Nony Éditeurs, 1908, Paris
