= Alphonse Péphau =

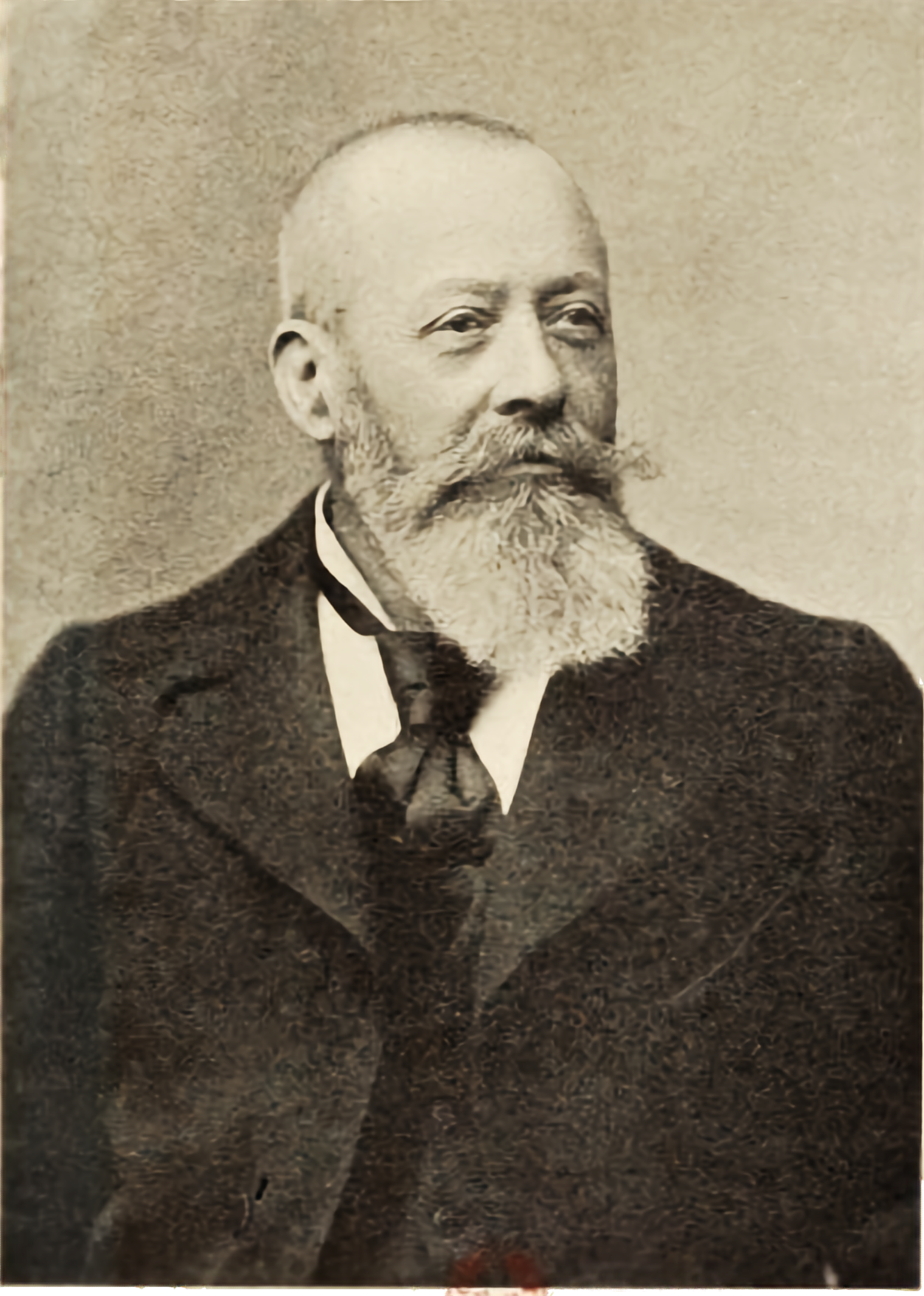
- Born: Jean Alphonse Péphau; July 1, 1837; Marsolan, Gers, France
- Died: October 12, 1921 (aged 84); Le Vésinet, Yvelines, France
- Education: University of Paris
- Occupations: Civil servant; newspaper administrator
- Awards: Commander of the Legion of Honour (1904); Order of the Crown (Romania) (1900)

Signature
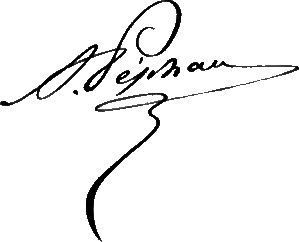

Jean Alphonse Péphau (1 July 1837 - 12 October 1921) was a French civil servant.

== Life ==
Born in Marsolan, he studied at the lycée in Auch then the lycée de Cahors in Cahors, where he began a lifelong friendship with Léon Gambetta. Moving to Paris to be a lawyer, he gained his licence to practice and succeeded in the civil service exam, joining the Ministry of Economics and Finance on 1 July 1859 as head of the general management of public accounts.

Gambetta became Interior Minister during the Siege of Paris in 1870 and on 4 September 1870 delegated Péphau from the Finance Ministry to the Interior Ministry to deal with the finances of the mobile guard, the national guard of Paris and the 'francs' corps. There he also took charge of feeding and housing those who had fled from the suburbs into central Paris. On 7 November 1871 Péphau, Gambetta and the most powerful of his political friends founded the newspaper la République française, followed by la Petite République on 12 April 1876.

On 20 September 1878 Péphau was put in charge of the national hospice of Les Quinze-Vingts and officially installed in that post the following 1 October. From that time onwards he introduced useful innovations and improvements there which benefitted its inhabitants, with the inspector-general of public asylums Augustin Constans nicknaming him "king of the blind". Rather than simply heading and paternally administering the 600,000 francs assigned to it annually from the Interior Ministry, he also extended his remit to blind people living elsewhere, assigning them annual pensions between 100 and 200 francs.

The institution's resources were insufficient to pay for its over 300 pension-recipients and the 1,800 blind people living out and so with his friend Théodore-Édouard Fieuzal (Note: Also the institution's optician.) he set up a national optician's clinic and histology laboratory there to try to reduce the ever-rising number of blind people. Through patronage from senator Léon Say and other public figures, Péphau also set up the Société d’Assistance pour les aveugles in 1886, which funded the national clinic (opened in 1880), the isolation ward and the Braille school at Saint-Mandé. The clinic welcomed all native French citizens and gave free operations to all whose blindness was curable - in 1889 almost 4,000 patients attended it, of whom four-fifths were cured by it.

He then founded another Braille school at Maisons-Alfort, (Note: Later moved to 152 rue de Bagnolet in Paris in 1885 before moving to Saint-Mandé in 1889, where it became known as the "Institut départemental des aveugles de la Seine".) which taught blind people a trade. The municipal council was also inspired to set up an asylum-workshop next to the school to complement it. Even after retiring from the Hospice, he remained its honorary director.

On 18 October 1894 the Conseil général de la Seine awarded him a gold medal valued at 200 francs. He was made a Knight of the Legion of Honour on 13 July 1870 and promoted to Officer and Commander in the same order on 30 July 1896 and 4 January 1904 respectively. On 24 July 1900 he was also awarded the Order of the Crown by Romania. He died at Vésinet.

== Works ==
- Monographie de l’École Braille à Saint-Mandé (Seine), Paris, impr. de Larousse, 1899, 80 p., in-4°, fig., pl. and portr. (OCLC 37928315)
- Monographie de la clinique ophtalmologique des Quinze-Vingts (preface by Henri Monod), Paris, Impr. de Chamerot et Renouard, 1901, viii-31, figure, and portraits, in-8° (OCLC 457408640) - originally published in the Revue philanthropique, 10 February 1901.
