= Blaye-les-Mines =

- Commune
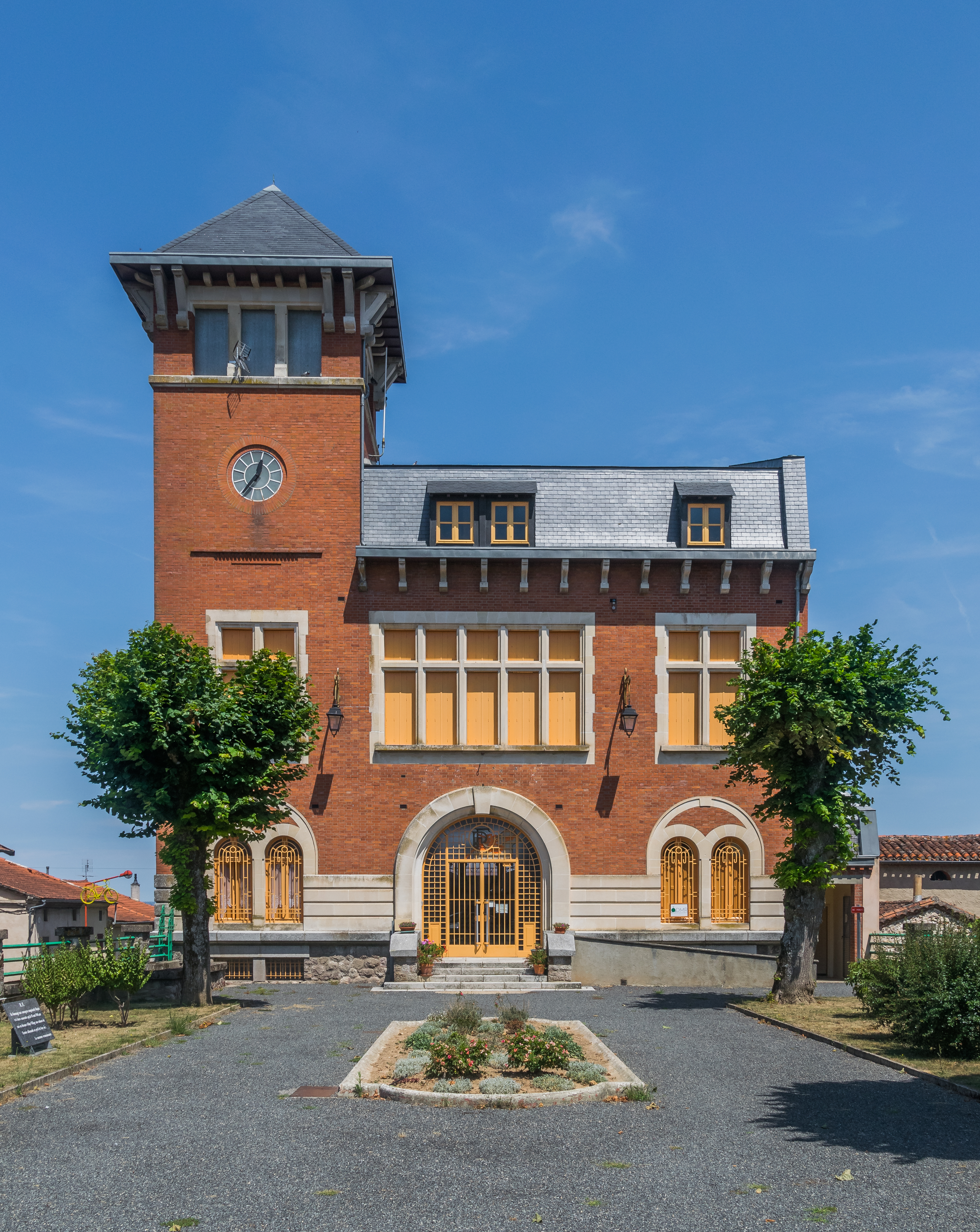
- Former town hall of Blaye-les-Mines

- Coat of arms
- Location of Blaye-les-Mines
- Location within France Location within Occitanie
- Coordinates: 44°01′54″N 2°07′57″E
- Country: France
- Region: Occitania
- Department: Tarn
- Arrondissement: Albi
- Canton: Carmaux-2 Vallée du Cérou
- Intercommunality: Carmausin-Ségala

Government
  - Mayor (2020–2026): Jean-François Kowalik
- Area^{1}: 8.88 km^{2} (3.43 sq mi)
- Elevation: 339 m (1,112 ft)
- Highest elevation: 344 m (1,129 ft)
- Lowest elevation: 241 m (791 ft)
- Population (2023): 2,902
  - Density: 327/km^{2} (846/sq mi)
- Time zone: UTC+01:00 (CET)
  - Summer (DST): UTC+02:00 (CEST)
- INSEE/Postal code: 81033 /81400
- ^{1} French Land Register data, which excludes lakes, ponds, glaciers > 1 km^{2} (0.386 sq mi or 247 acres) and river estuaries.

Blaye-les-Mines (French pronunciation: [blaj le min]; Occitan: Blaia) is a commune in the Tarn department and Occitanie region of southern France.

The settlement grew up around the home of Gabriel de Solages (1711–1799), who founded the Compagnie minière de Carmaux and a glassworks at his château at Blaye.

== Population ==
Historical population
Year	Pop.	±% p.a.
1968	5,526	—
1975	4,563	−2.70%
1982	3,919	−2.15%
1990	3,227	−2.40%
1999	2,944	−1.01%
2007	3,063	+0.50%
2012	3,061	−0.01%
2017	2,987	−0.49%
2023	2,902	−0.48%
Source: INSEE

== See also ==
- Communes of the Tarn department
