= Gabriel de Solages =

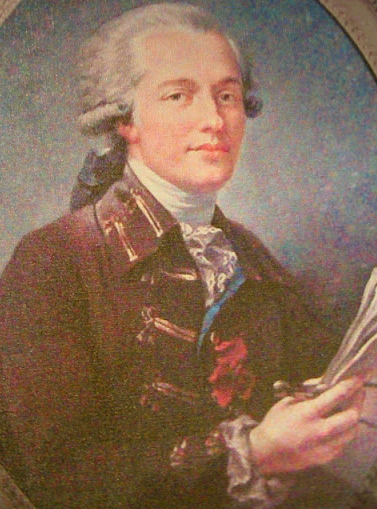
- Portrait of Gabriel de Solages from the Musée du verre, Carmaux
- Born: 19 August 1711; Vailhauze, Saint-Affrique, Aveyron, France
- Died: 28 July 1799 (aged 87); Blaye, Tarn, France
- Occupations: soldier and industrialist

Gabriel de Solages (19 August 1711 – 28 July 1799) was a French soldier and industrialist. After serving in Italy, Germany and Bohemia he began exploiting coal mines on the family property near Carmaux in the Tarn department of southern France. To make use of surplus coal he opened a glass bottle factory and an iron works, and also opened a factory to make shipbuilding supplies.

== Early years ==
The Solages family is mentioned in documents from 1028. In 1724 they gained large landholdings in Carmaux by marriage. Gabriel Charles, chevalier de Solages, seigneur de Saint-Benott et de Blaye, was born on 19 August 1711 at Vailhauze, Saint-Affrique, Aveyron. He was the son of François-Paul de Solages, Marquis de Carmaux in Albigeois, and his second wife Isabeau Catherine de Galatrave. His elder brothers were Antoine-Paulin de Solages (1706–78), Marquis de Carmaux and François-Paul (1707–73), Comte de Solages.

Gabriel de Solages was intelligent and energetic. He was received as a page of the king on 15 September 1729. He campaigned in Italy with his brothers as a lieutenant in the Royal-Carabineers regiment, and later fought in Germany and Bohemia. He rose through the ranks, becoming mestre-de-camp for a brigade of carabineers. On 13 October 1749 he married Marie de Juillot de Longchamps, daughter of Jean-François de Juillot de Longchamps, equerry, and of Françoise de Guyot.

== Coal mines ==
Location of Blaye-les-Mines in France

A royal decree of 14 January 1744 let the government grant concessions to private individuals to exploit the subsoil. At this time industry was developing in France and coal was an attractive alternative to increasingly scarce wood. Gabriel's brother, the marquis Antoine Paulin, received a concession in 1747, and again in 1748. Gabriel recalled that "since the disarray of my brother's affairs made it impossible for him to make better use of this new authorization than he had made of the first, he engaged me to take it over". Gabriel agreed, with the consent of his mother, to become the head of the mining operation. Gabriel de Solages quickly suspended the work at the existing Mon-Talba mine because air did not reach the bottom of the galleries and started a new mine.

The 1744 regulation stated that mine shafts could be no more than 8 feet (2.4 m) wide at their opening, which was inadequate. Gabriel asked for permission to make wider shafts with a rectangular cross-section with ladders attached to the walls for use by the miners and a separate chimney through which air could be blown into all the galleries. He braced the galleries with wood and cement structures to prevent collapses, and took precautions to prevent flooding. He encountered a layer of high quality coal in the new mine at a depth of 320 feet (98 m). He suspended work and, with government permission, visited coal mines in the north to obtain further knowledge, and brought back a colony of experienced Flemish miners.

On 19 December 1752 Louis XV granted Gabriel de Solages the concession of coal mines at Carmaux. This gave Gabriel de Solages the mining rights within a radius on one league (Note: The league (lieue) was a measure of distance in pre-revolutionary France. There were several types of league, ranging from about 3.9 kilometres (2.4 mi) to 4.7 kilometres (2.9 mi)) around his Blaye château. By 1754 Solages was employing 12 Flemish miners and 20 local workers engaged in various operations, as well as a dozen horses. He had two working mines, each with a machine to hoist up the coal, was producing 100 barrels a day and had 6,000 barrels in store. Bordeaux at this time consumed 14,600 barrels a year, the diocese of Albi 3,000 and the region about 300. The enterprise was struggling due to the expenses from the glassworks, the high cost of transport of the coal, and competition from the English, who were dumping cheap coal on the market. In the years that followed he suffered from competition with nearby mines, but due to poor management several of these were abandoned, one was burned and others were flooded, leaving Solages the only mine operator.

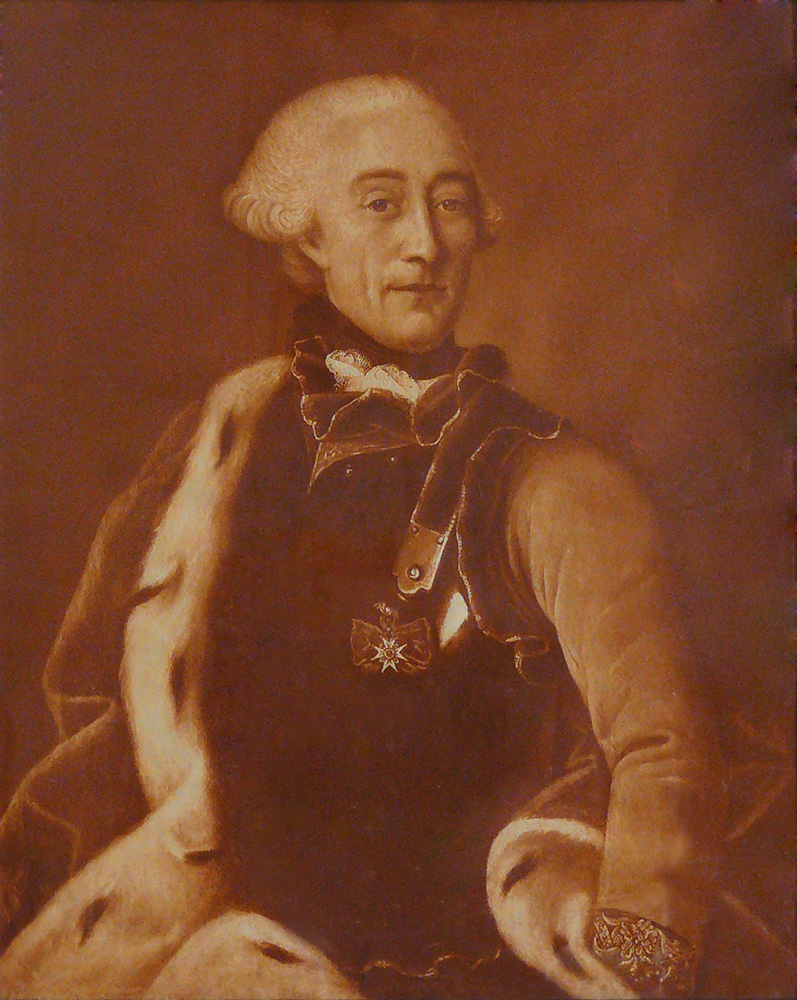
Portrait of Gabriel de Solages held by the Musée du Verre

In 1767 the king granted Solages a 50-year extension to his concession of 1752. The king also gave him the sole right for three years to search for coal within three leagues around the town of Albi, with the promise to grant a concession of one league around any mines that he exploited. In 1769 the mine beside the glassworks caught fire and had to be flooded by diverting a stream into it. The next year the king extended the license for exploration by another three years. Solages sunk two more pits, but the coal was inferior to the flooded mine. He extended a gallery towards the flooded mine in hope of locating the high-quality seam, but was forced to abandon this after three years due to flooding that his pump could not handle.

In 1789 there were two working shafts at Carmaux, connected by subterranean galleries, and a third shaft that could be brought into operation within two weeks if needed. The mines employed 100 workers and 14 horses, and produced 16,000 barrels a year, each holding 11 cubic feet (0.31 m^{3}). Solages was not forced to close the coal mines in 1789 when the French Revolution began. At that time he was employing 100 workers. He was arrested in 1793 and his mines were placed under sequestration. A decree by the Committee of Public Safety of 24 Frimaire year III (13 December 1794) restored the lands and defined the limits of the 8,800 hectares (22,000 acres) concession. The mining rights would remain in the Solages family until the Compagnie minière de Carmaux was nationalized in 1947.

== Glass works ==
To make use of the coal Solages established a glass factory, and sent for glass workers from Bohemia and Saxony. The factory was licensed by a decree of 2 May 1751. It was opened in a ceremony on 20 April 1754 with the assistance of the curé of Carmaux, who lit the first fire, and two other priests. The glassworks were in a building beside the chateau with two furnaces, only one of which operated at any time. There were four store-rooms for the bottles, a room for the ashes, one for sand and one for earth. There were other shops for grinding stones, for blacksmiths and for carpenters. The workers were housed in a separate building.

The constituents of the glass were placed in crucibles in openings in the furnace and melted by the coal fire. A team of four glassworkers stood at each opening making the bottles. At first there were five teams, including one to replace sick or absent workers. In 1758 the 20 workers made 200,000 bottles, which were sold in Montauban, Toulouse and Bourdeaux. He had planned to also make windows, but after three years he abandoned this attempt due to competition from factories in the Lyonnais. By 1789 the glassworks employed 62 workmen and produced 500,000 English-style brown bottles annually. Solages was paternalistic, giving pensions to retired glassworkers and often employing their widows in the glassworks or in his household.

== Other activities ==
Solages had a brick factory built near the glassworks and started an iron smelting furnace, to be supplied by the mines at Alban. Solages also operated a factory for shipbuilding materials.

Gabriel de Solages was made a brigadier of cavalry on 16 March 1767. He was appointed the king's commanding officer in Albigeois on 15 November 1770. He was promoted to maréchal de camp on 1 March 1780. Gabriel de Solages died on 28 July 1799 at the Château de La Verrerie, Carmaux, at the age of 87. His son Francois-Gabriel de Solages (1752–1834), took over the family business. His wife died in October 1827 at 103 years of age.

== Sources ==
- Barrau, Hippolyte de (1853), Documens historiques et généalogiques sur les familles et les hommes remarquables du Rouergue
- Goldberg, Harvey (1958), "Jaurès and the Carmaux Strikes: The Coal Strike of 1892", The American Journal of Economics and Sociology, 17 (2): 167–178, doi:10.1111/j.1536-7150.1958.tb00239.x, JSTOR 3484674
- Jolibois, Emile (1893), "Les Houillères de Carmaux", Revue historique, scientifique & littéraire du département du Tarn (ancien pays d'Albigeois) (in French), Impr. Nouguiès.
- Monnié, A. (1929), "Le bassin houiller de Carmaux-Albi" (PDF), Annales de Géographie (in French), 38 (216): 577–586, doi:10.3406/geo.1929.9935
- Pierfit, Gabriel-Charles (fondateur des mines de Carmaux) de SOLAGES (in French)
- Scott, Joan Wallach (1974), The Glassworkers of Carmaux: French Craftsmen and Political Action in a Nineteenth-century City, Harvard University Press, ISBN 978-0-674-35440-1
