= Baume-les-Dames =

- Commune
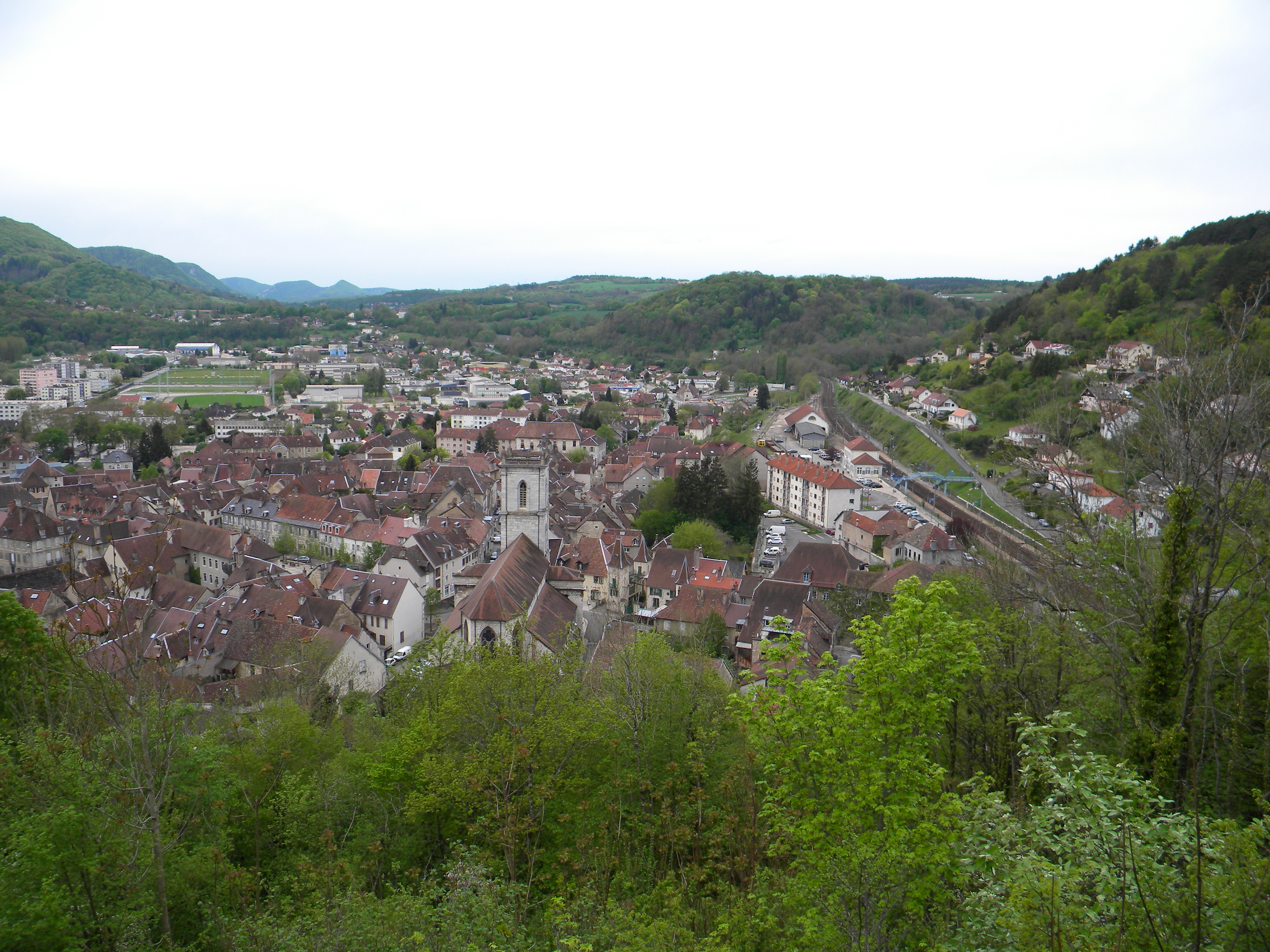
- A general view of Baume-les-Dames

- Coat of arms
- Location of Baume-les-Dames
- Location within France Location within Bourgogne-Franche-Comté
- Coordinates: 47°21′10″N 6°21′39″E
- Country: France
- Region: Bourgogne-Franche-Comté
- Department: Doubs
- Arrondissement: Besançon
- Canton: Baume-les-Dames

Government
  - Mayor (2020–2026): Arnaud Marthey
- Area^{1}: 24.79 km^{2} (9.57 sq mi)
- Highest elevation: 538 m (1,765 ft)
- Lowest elevation: 261 m (856 ft)
- Population (2023): 5,155
  - Density: 207.9/km^{2} (538.6/sq mi)
- Time zone: UTC+01:00 (CET)
  - Summer (DST): UTC+02:00 (CEST)
- INSEE/Postal code: 25047 /25110
- ^{1} French Land Register data, which excludes lakes, ponds, glaciers > 1 km^{2} (0.386 sq mi or 247 acres) and river estuaries.

Baume-les-Dames (French pronunciation: [bom le dam]) is a commune in the Doubs department in the Bourgogne-Franche-Comté region in eastern France. The French mineralogist and chemist Jacques-Joseph Ébelmen (1814–1852), the writer and poet Charles-Émilien Thuriet (1832–1920) and the archaeologist Gustave Fougères (1863–1927) were all born in Baume-les-Dames.

== Population ==
In 1973 the former commune of Champvans-lès-Baume was absorbed by Baume-les-Dames.

Historical population

Year	Pop.	±% p.a.
1793	2,220	—
1800	2,300	+0.51%
1806	2,160	−1.04%
1821	2,173	+0.04%
1831	2,467	+1.28%
1836	2,519	+0.42%
1841	2,543	+0.19%
1846	2,561	+0.14%
1851	2,587	+0.20%
1856	2,615	+0.22%
1861	2,577	−0.29%
1866	2,562	−0.12%
1872	2,463	−0.65%
1876	2,762	+2.91%
1881	2,821	+0.42%
1886	2,841	+0.14%
1891	2,555	−2.10%
1896	2,991	+3.20%
1901	3,134	+0.94%

Year	Pop.	±% p.a.
1906	3,257	+0.77%
1911	3,280	+0.14%
1921	3,147	−0.41%
1926	3,161	+0.09%
1931	3,043	−0.76%
1936	2,898	−0.97%
1946	2,876	−0.08%
1954	3,003	+0.54%
1962	4,038	+3.77%
1968	4,914	+3.33%
1975	5,531	+1.70%
1982	5,303	−0.60%
1990	5,237	−0.16%
1999	5,384	+0.31%
2007	5,333	−0.12%
2012	5,291	−0.16%
2017	5,063	−0.88%
2023	5,155	+0.30%

Source: EHESS and INSEE (1975-2023)

== See also ==
- Communes of the Doubs department
- Abbey of Baume-les-Dames
