= Charles-Émilien Thuriet =

French poet (1832–1920)

Charles-Émilien Thuriet (5 October 1832, Baume-les-Dames – 8 December 1920, Turin) was a 19th–20th-century French poet.

A magistrate by occupation, Thuriet was, with Charles Weiss, cofounder of the Revue littéraire de la Franche-Comté.

Thuriet was an associated member of the Académie de Besançon.

== Publications ==
- Les procès s’en vont ! ou Essai sur les causes générales qui ont amené en France la diminution des procès civils,, Paris, Dumoulin, 1861.
- Revue littéraire de la Franche-Comté, Besançon, Outhenin Chalandre fils, 1863–1868.
- Traditions populaires de l’arrondissement de Poligny, Poligny, G. Mareschal, 1875.
- Traditions populaires du Jura, Poligny, Impr. G. Mareschal, 1877.
- Étude historique sur le bourg de Rougemont (Doubs), Besançon, Dodivers, 1877.
- La Chevalerie de Saint-Georges en Franche-Comté, Poligny, G. Mareschal, 1878.
- En Franche-Comté. Facéties, proverbes et types populaires, Poligny, G. Mareschal, 1879.
- Usages locaux ayant force de loi dans le département du Doubs, recueillis et coordonnés d’après les travaux de plusieurs commissions administratives…, Besançon, Ch. Marion, 1879.
- Contes populaires franc-comtois, [S. l.], 1880.
- Notice sur Richard-Baudin, Besançon, Dodivers, 1881.
- La Fileuse; Le Très humble serviteur; Entre la poire et le fromage : pièces de vers, Besançon, Dodivers, 1882.
- Causerie sur Charles Viancin, par M. Ch. Thuriet, mémoire lu à la séance publique de l’Académie de Besançon, le 26 janvier 1882, Besançon, Dodivers, 1882.
- La Ballade du cordier; Une vieille figure comtoise, la mère Bouvet, Deux pièces de vers lues à la Société d’émulation du Doubs, 1884-1885, Besançon, Dodivers, 1885.
- La Fontaine de la Rochette, à Saint-Claude (Jura), pièce de vers de Charles Thuriet, lue à la Société d’émulation du Doubs, dans sa séance du 15 décembre 1886, Besançon, Dodivers, 1887.
- Notre-Dame des fleurs, et Une destinée, Besançon, P. Jacquin, 1888.
- Étude sur Marsoudet, poète franc-comtois avec fragments nouveaux et encore inédits, Besançon, P. Jacquin, 1888.
- Charles Nodier écrivain franc-comtois, Lons-le-Saunier, L. Declume, 1889.
- Traditions populaires du Doubs : région de Baume-les-Dames, Besançon, P. Jacquin, 1889.
- Saint-Claude et ses environs, Bourg-en-Bresse, Impr. Générale, 1890.
- Une visite au berceau et à la tombe de Lamartine, Besançon, P. Jacquin, 1890.
- Le Râteau; Un électeur de 1848 à Besançon, anecdotes franc-comtoises dites à la Société d’émulation du Doubs en 1889, Besançon, Dodivers, 1890.
- Lamartine et la Franche-Comté, Besançon, Dodivers, 1891.
- Reine Cigale, récit extrait des notes d’un juge d’instruction. (juin 1891), Besançon, P. Jacquin, 1891.
- Deux causeries sur Lamartine : Visite au berceau et à la tombe; Lamartine et la Franche-Comté, Baume-les-Dames, A. Broihier, 1891.
- Proverbes judiciaires, Paris, L. Lechevalier, 1891.
- Reine Cigale : récit extrait des notes d’un juge d’instruction, Besançon, P. Jacquin, 1891.
- L’Expiation, ou la Légende du sculpteur, Besançon, P. Jacquin, 1892.
- Le Testament du professeur, récit extrait des notes d’un juge de paix, Besançon, P. Jacquin, 1892.
- Une Franc-comtoise, lady Carswelle, Besançon, Millot frères, 1893.
- Anecdotes inédites ou peu connues sur Lamartine, Besançon, P. Jacquin, 1893.
- Dernier voyage de P. J. Proudhon à Besançon, Besançon, P. Jacquin, 1896.
- Une promenade de J.-J. Rousseau en 1765, Besançon, Dodivers, A. Cariage, 1897.
- Francis Wey et Charles Nodier (causerie), Besançon, Dodivers, 1897.
- Le Chevalier de La Rochelle, Besançon, P. Jacquin, 1898.
- Charmoille : histoire vraie, Besançon, Dodivers, 1898.
- Profil d’un ministre sous la Terreur (Philibert Buchot), Besançon, Dodivers, 1899.
- Marie de Magdala (petit poème évangélique), Besançon, Dodivers, 1899.
- Guigue de Champvans, esquisse. (Mars 1900.), Besançon, P. Jacquin, 1900.
- Le Colonel Oudet, Besançon, P. Jacquin, 1901.
- Boncerf, portrait historique, Besançon, P. Jacquin, 1902.
- La Princesse d’azur (idylle indienne), Besançon, J. Dodivers, 1905.
- Guyétand du Mont Jura et le « Génie vengé », Besançon, Jacquin, 1905.
- Le Berceau de Gersen, Besançon, J. Dodivers, 1906.
- Souvenirs littéraires…, Besançon, J. Dodivers, 1907.
- Projet de bibliographie lamartinienne française-italienne, avec Camille Monnet, Lettre-préface de Charles Thuriet, Turin, S. Lattès, 1909.
- L’Orgue, Besançon, Dodivers, 1910.
- Traditions populaires de la Haute-Saône et du Jura, Marseille, Lafitte Repr., 1979.
- Traditions populaires du Doubs, Marseille, Laffitte, 1980.
- Histoire de Rougemont, Paris, Res universis, 1990.
- Traditions populaires de la Haute-Saône, Péronnas, Éd. de la Tour Gile, 2000.
