= René Reille =

René Charles Reille-Soult-Dalmatie
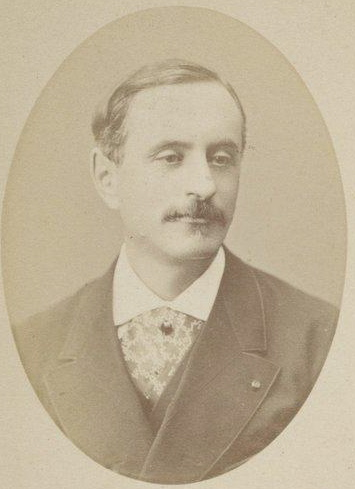
- René Reille in 1879

Deputy for Tarn
- In office 23 May 1869 – 4 September 1870

Deputy for Tarn
- In office 20 February 1876 – 21 November 1898

Under-secretary of State, Ministry of the Interior
- In office 17 May 1877 – 22 November 1877

Personal details
- Born: 4 February 1835 Paris, France
- Died: 21 November 1898 (aged 63) Paris, France
- Party: Bonapartists
- Occupation: Soldier, industrialist, politician

Baron René Charles Reille-Soult-Dalmatie (4 February 1835 – 21 November 1898) was a French soldier, industrialist and politician. He came from a wealthy military family with mining interests in the south of France. He served in the army until 1869, then went into national politics. He aligned with the right wing Bonapartist group during the French Second Republic.

== Early years ==
René Charles Reille-Soult-Dalmatie was born on 4 February 1835 in Paris, the third son of Marshal Honoré Charles Reille. His mother was Victoire Masséna, daughter of Marshal André Masséna. He enrolled in the École spéciale militaire de Saint-Cyr and became a second lieutenant at the Staff College on 1 January 1856. He was promoted to Lieutenant in 1856 and captain in 1858. Reille served as a captain in the Second Italian War of Independence in 1859, and was aide-de-camp to Marshal Jacques Louis Randon and then to Marshal Adolphe Niel, whom he followed to the Ministry of War.

Count Reille married Geneviève Soult in December 1860. She was daughter of the last Duke of Dalmatia, Napoléon Hector Soult, who died on 31 December 1857. Her grandfather was Marshal Jean-de-Dieu Soult. Reille was the direct heir of a family that had profited from political connections since the First French Empire, and was one of the leading capitalists of the Midi. He was one of the founders of the Comité des forges, the French iron masters' association. (Note: The Comité des forges was founded in 1846 with Eugène Schneider (1805–75) as President and Jules Hochet (1813–67) as vice-president.) He was a member of the Comité des houillères, the coal mine owners' association, and president of the board of directors of the Carmaux mining company. His opponents called him the "King of the Black Mountain."

Marshal Niel died on 13 August 1869, and Reille resigned from the army on 3 December 1869. During the Franco-Prussian War of 1870 he commanded the mobile forces of Tarn-et-Garonne.

== Political career ==
While still in the army and aide to Niel, Reille became a member of the General Council of Tarn for the canton of Saint-Amans-Soult in 1867, and was elected deputy for the second district of Tarn as the government's candidate on 24 May 1869. During the Second French Empire Reille was deputy for Tarn until 4 September 1870, sitting on the center right.

Under the French Third Republic Reille was made a Commander of the Legion of Honour on 7 February 1871, and was reelected to the Tarn General Council, where he was vice-president. Reille was elected deputy for Tarn on 20 February 1876 on the Appel au peuple platform and reelected on the same platform on 14 October 1877. His election on 14 October 1877 was subject to the thorough and lengthy investigation due to the fact the Reille had been an assistant of Oscar Bardi de Fourtou. Although cleared by the official inquiry, his election was invalidated due to official pressure on 1 December 1878.

Reille was reelected on 2 February 1879 and resumed his place with the imperialist majority. After being reelected on 21 August 1881 he continued to vote with the conservative minority, and participated in debates on military subjects. In April 1884 he was rapporteur of the colonial army project. In June 1885 he submitted a counter-proposal to the military law to return to a mixed system of a permanent army with a mobile lagar. He was reelected for Tarn on the Union des Droites platform on 4 October 1885. He voted against the Lisbonne law defining freedom of the press, and against the prosecution of General Georges Ernest Boulanger.

In the election of 22 September 1889 Reille was elected for the 2nd district of Castres, presenting himself as a "resolute conservative and a sincere Catholic." During this legislative session a prolonged strike broke out at the Carmaux mines, of which he chaired the board of directors. The anarchists made an attempt on his life on the avenue de l'Opéra, from which he escaped although there were other victims. He was reelected on 18 March 1894 and 8 May 1898, holding office until his death on 21 November 1898. Reille was President of the Comité des forges from 1890 until his death.

René Reille died in Paris on 21 November 1898. He was survived by three sons, André, Xavier et Amédée, to represent the department of Tarn after him. His widow, the baronne Reille, became the second president of the Ligue patriotique des Françaises (League of Patriotic French Women).

== Sources ==
- "Comité des forges", Encyclopédie Larousse (in French), Éditions Larousse
- Goldberg, Harvey (1962), The Life of Jean Jaurès, Univ of Wisconsin Press, ISBN 978-0-299-02564-9
- Jolly, Jean (1960–77), "René, Charles Reille-Soult-Dalmatie", Dictionnaire des parlementaires francais de 1889 a 1940 (in French)
- Magali Della Sudda, "De la dame d'oeuvre à la militante d'action sociale...", Musea (in French)
- Priouret, Roger (1992-02-04), Origines du patronat français, Grasset, ISBN 978-2-246-79486-8
- "René, Charles Reille-Soult-Dalmatie", Sycomore, Assemblée nationale
- Robert, Adolphe; Cougny, Gaston (1889), Dictionnaire des parlementaires francais de 1789 a 1889 (in French)
