= Junior Madrigal =

Mexican footballer (born 1982)

Personal information
- Full name: Junior Félix Madrigal Ortíz
- Date of birth: 2 June 1982 (age 44)
- Place of birth: Morelia, Michoacán, Mexico
- Height: 1.83 m (6 ft 0 in)
- Position: Goalkeeper

Team information
- Current team: La Piedad
- Number: 30

Senior career*
Years	Team	Apps	(Gls)
2003–2007	Monarcas Morelia	3	(0)
2007–2009	Carabobo FC	17	(0)
2009–	La Piedad	0	(0)
- * Club domestic league appearances and goals as of September 27, 2009

Junior Félix Madrigal Ortíz (born 2 June 1982) is a Mexican footballer who plays as a goalkeeper for La Piedad.

== Career ==
Madrigal made his professional debut for Monarcas Morelia on 23 October 2003, replacing an injured Moisés Muñoz at minute 80, during a 1–0 victory over San Luis.

In 2007, he made a move to the Venezuela outfit Carabobo FC, and made a handful of starts for them as goalie.

During the Apertura 2009 season, he returned to Mexico to play for La Piedad.
