= Gustave Fougères =

French archaeologist (1863–1927)

Gustave Fougères (24 April 1863, Baume-les-Dames (Doubs) – 7 December 1927, Paris, aged 64) was a French archaeologist, spécialist of archaic Greece.

== Biography ==
A student of the École normale supérieure, he joined the French School at Athens in 1885. He explored Thessaly and Anatolia and searched the gymnasium of Delos (1886) and the ancient city of Mantineia with its elliptical rampart (1887–1888).

He taught in Lille and Paris, traveling through Greece repeatedly and published his Guide de la Grèce.

In 1913, after he became director of the French School at Athens, he continued the excavations already begun at Delos, Thasos and Philippi and opened new sites in Macedonia and Anatolia (Claros, Aphrodisias). Archaeological research in Greece were interrupted by First World War.

He taught archaeology at the Sorbonne from 1919. His courses attracted many foreign students.

== Selected publications ==
- 1898: Mantinée et l'Arcadie Orientale
- 1910: Sélinonte
- 1911: Guide de la Grèce, Guides Joanne, 2^{e} edition
- 1912: Athènes
