= Alfred Léon Gérault-Richard =

French journalist and politician

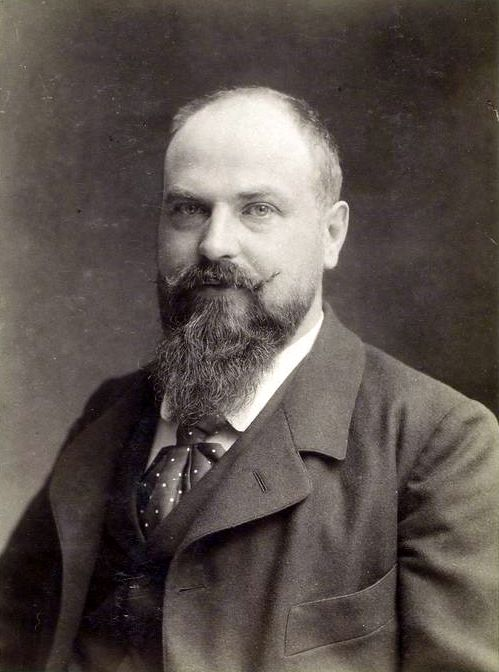
Gérault-Richard

Alfred Léon Gérault (1860 – 6 December 1911), known as Gérault-Richard, was a French journalist and socialist politician, born at Bonnétable (in the département of Sarthe) of a peasant family.

Gérault-Richard began life as a working upholsterer, first at Le Mans, and then at Paris (1880), where his peasant and socialist songs won him fame in the Montmartre quarter. Prosper-Olivier Lissagaray, the communard, offered him a position on La Bataille, and he became a regular contributor to the progressive journals, especially to La Petite République, of which he became editor-in-chief in 1897.

In 1893, he founded Le Chambard, and was imprisoned for a year (1894) for a personal attack upon the president, Jean Casimir-Perier. In January 1895 he was elected to the Chamber of Deputies as a member of the Socialist Party for the 13th arrondissement of Paris. Gérault-Richard was defeated at the elections of 1898 at Paris, but was twice re-elected (1902–1906, 1906–1911) by the colony of Guadeloupe. He died in Fréjus.
