= Agence Radio =

French news agency

Agence Radio or Radio-Agence télégraphique : télégrammes et informations du monde entier (Telegraphic Radio-Agency: telegrams and information from the whole world) was a French news agency with links to Greece.

== History ==
It was created in Paris in 1904 by the journalist Henri Turot. During the First World War it was run by Jean Galmot, Marius Gabion (1867–1945) and Gabriel Astruc (1864–1938). Its official creation date was 14 December 1918 with the support of Jean Galmot (1879–1928).

With an office in Athens, it received major financial support from the vénizélist arms dealer Basil Zaharoff. Wishing Greece to join the war on the side of the Entente, Aristide Briand introduced Zaharoff to Turot. Around the same time the Germans set up the Transocean news agency. After Venizélos's fall from power in November 1920 Zaharoff lost interest in Agence Radio and Georges Clemenceau quickly became opposed to Basil Zaharoff and found Turot too pacifist. This led to Agence Radio being taken over by Agence Havas.

Previously director of the telegraphic news agency "L'Information", François Mousset was head of Agence Radio from 1934 to 1940, on secondment from the Ministry of Foreign Affairs. The Blum government took over Agence Radio in January 1937 and Havas conceded 51% of the business to it. The government then agreed to pay Agence Radio 200,000 francs a month and demanded that Havas take over the funding of France Actualités from the industrialists who then owned it. Havas had 52% of the business, which was renamed "Les diffusions modernes" and Gaumont 48%.

In 1938 Agence Radio took on François Crucy as its chief editor – he would later fight in the French Resistance. At the end of that year Crucy was dismissed by the Foreign Ministry. In the extraordinary general assembly of 19 September 1941, it was renamed Agence Téléradio, broadcasting French news overseas from Lyon and Bordeaux. It ceased transmitting in 1943 under German pressure and became a branch of the Vichy Government's Office français d'information, transmitting to the American and Far East zones before ending fully in 1944.
