= Carmaux =

- Commune
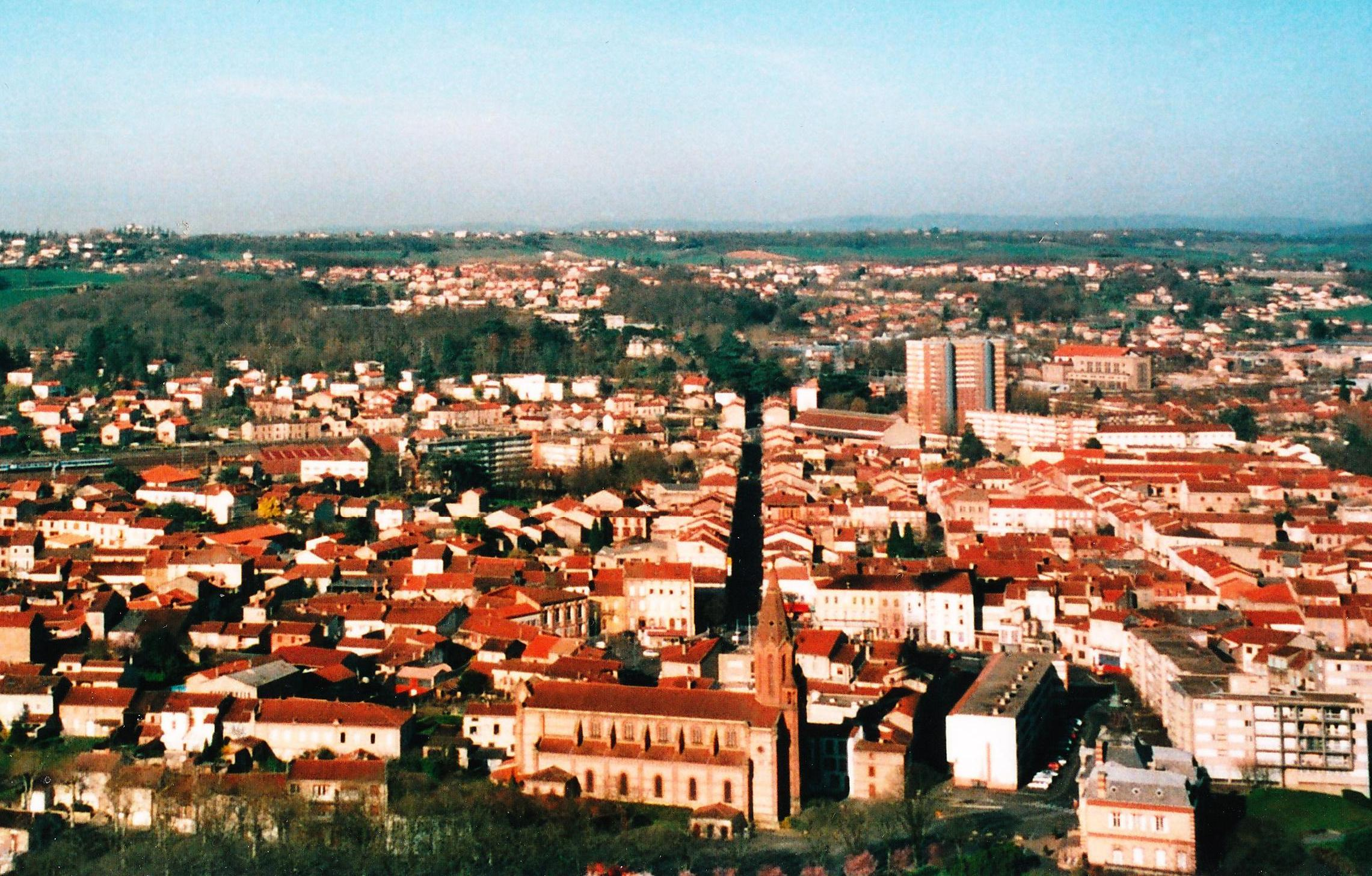
- View of the city center of Carmaux

- Coat of arms
- Location of Carmaux
- Location within France Location within Occitanie
- Coordinates: 44°03′00″N 2°09′32″E
- Country: France
- Region: Occitania
- Department: Tarn
- Arrondissement: Albi
- Canton: Carmaux-1 Le Ségala and Carmaux-2 Vallée du Cérou
- Intercommunality: Carmausin-Ségala

Government
  - Mayor (2021–2026): Jean-Louis Bousquet
- Area^{1}: 14.16 km^{2} (5.47 sq mi)
- Elevation: 235 m (771 ft)
- Highest elevation: 340 m (1,120 ft)
- Lowest elevation: 228 m (748 ft)
- Population (2023): 9,872
  - Density: 697.2/km^{2} (1,806/sq mi)
- Time zone: UTC+01:00 (CET)
  - Summer (DST): UTC+02:00 (CEST)
- INSEE/Postal code: 81060 /81400
- ^{1} French Land Register data, which excludes lakes, ponds, glaciers > 1 km^{2} (0.386 sq mi or 247 acres) and river estuaries.

Carmaux (French pronunciation: [kaʁmo]; Occitan: Carmauç) is a commune in the Tarn department in southern France.

== Industries ==
The Compagnie minière de Carmaux has its origins in a coal mining concession granted in 1852 to Gabriel de Solages, which became the Compagnie minière de Carmaux. He also founded a glass bottle factory, fueled by the coal. Carmaux was famous for its industries of coal mining (from the thirteenth century to 2000) and its glassworks (from the eighteenth century to 1931).

== Geography ==
The Cérou flows northwestward through the commune and crosses the town. Carmaux station has rail connections to Toulouse, Albi and Rodez.

== Demographics ==
Historical population

Year	Pop.	±% p.a.
1793	849	—
1800	1,040	+2.94%
1806	1,518	+6.51%
1821	1,440	−0.35%
1831	1,765	+2.06%
1836	1,881	+1.28%
1841	2,143	+2.64%
1846	2,520	+3.29%
1851	2,678	+1.22%
1856	3,743	+6.93%
1861	4,043	+1.55%
1866	4,758	+3.31%
1872	5,010	+0.86%
1876	6,160	+5.30%
1881	6,905	+2.31%
1886	8,059	+3.14%
1891	9,591	+3.54%
1896	10,068	+0.98%
1901	10,956	+1.70%

Year	Pop.	±% p.a.
1906	10,894	−0.11%
1911	11,064	+0.31%
1921	11,273	+0.19%
1926	11,607	+0.59%
1931	11,129	−0.84%
1936	10,448	−1.25%
1946	11,136	+0.64%
1954	11,485	+0.39%
1962	14,565	+3.01%
1968	14,755	+0.22%
1975	13,208	−1.57%
1982	12,113	−1.23%
1990	10,957	−1.25%
1999	10,231	−0.76%
2007	10,268	+0.05%
2012	9,774	−0.98%
2017	9,500	−0.57%
2023	9,872	+0.64%

Source: EHESS and INSEE (1968-2023)

== Famous residents ==
- Bernard Lazare: journalist
- Jean Jaurès: politician
- Jack Cantoni: France Rugby Union International 1970–4
- Thomas Portes, politician

== See also ==
- Communes of the Tarn department
