= Marsolan =

- Commune
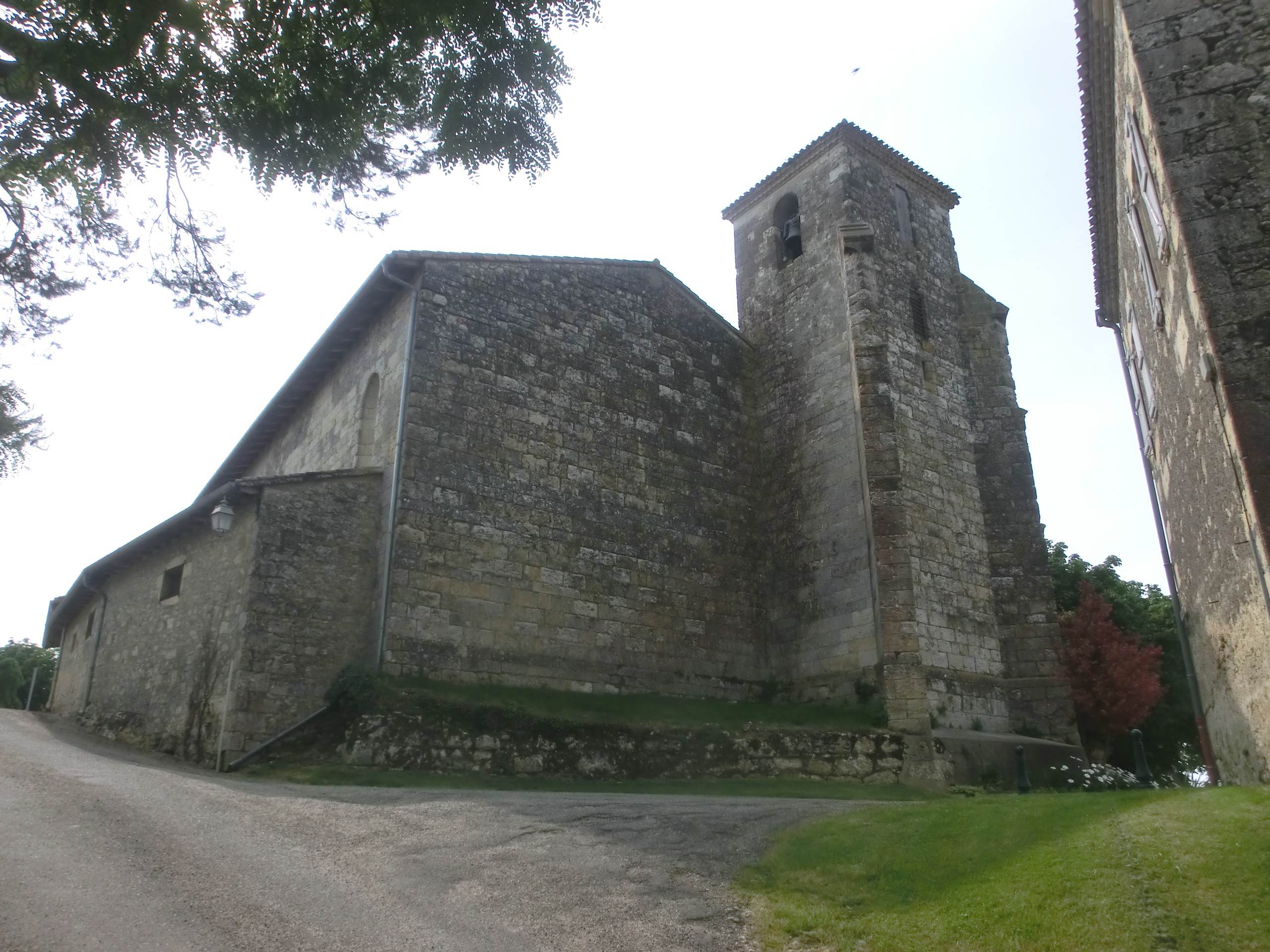
- The church in Marsolan

- Coat of arms
- Location of Marsolan
- Location within France Location within Occitanie
- Coordinates: 43°56′38″N 0°32′25″E
- Country: France
- Region: Occitania
- Department: Gers
- Arrondissement: Condom
- Canton: Lectoure-Lomagne

Government
  - Mayor (2020–2026): Dominique Gonella
- Area^{1}: 26.14 km^{2} (10.09 sq mi)
- Elevation: 178 m (584 ft)
- Highest elevation: 214 m (702 ft)
- Lowest elevation: 87 m (285 ft)
- Population (2023): 438
  - Density: 16.8/km^{2} (43.4/sq mi)
- Time zone: UTC+01:00 (CET)
  - Summer (DST): UTC+02:00 (CEST)
- INSEE/Postal code: 32239 /32700
- ^{1} French Land Register data, which excludes lakes, ponds, glaciers > 1 km^{2} (0.386 sq mi or 247 acres) and river estuaries.

Marsolan (French pronunciation: [maʁsɔlɑ̃]; Occitan: Marçolan) is a commune in the Gers department in southwestern France.

== Geography ==
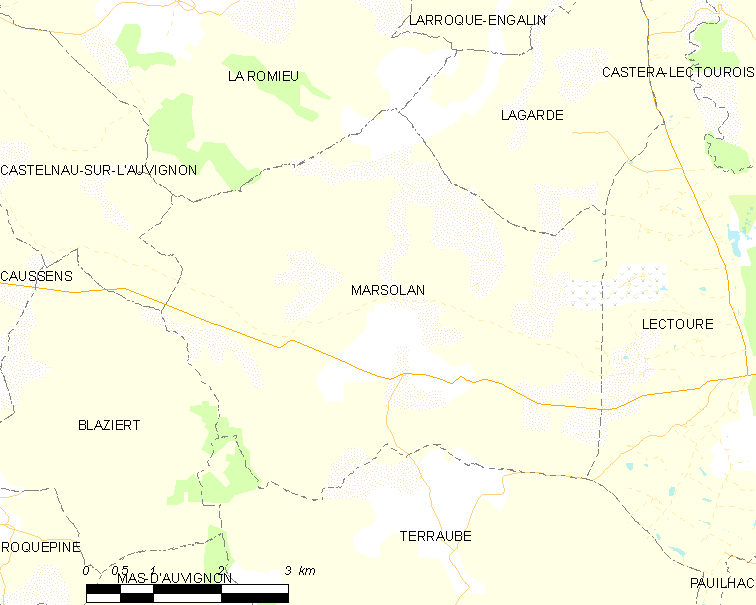
Marsolan and its surrounding communes

== Heraldry ==
Marsolan	Created by JF Binon. On the Commune website, 2024 Azure, a rock argent issuing from the base charged with a lion gules, surmounted by a shell or and accompanied on the flanks by two ears of wheat stalked and leaved of the same.

== Population ==
Historical population
Year	Pop.	±% p.a.
1968	481	—
1975	387	−3.06%
1982	342	−1.75%
1990	384	+1.46%
1999	388	+0.12%
2007	429	+1.26%
2012	458	+1.32%
2017	458	+0.00%
2023	438	−0.74%
Source: INSEE

== See also ==
- Communes of the Gers department
