= Lao Silesu =

Italian composer

Stanislao Silesu (5 July 1883 in Samassi – 1953 in Paris) was an Italian composer. His father Luigi was organist at the Cathedral of Santa Clara.

== Works ==
- Lao Silesu, Concerto per pianoforte e Orchestra, Foglie sparse, Notturno, Preludi, Orchestra Sinfonica di Cagliari, Nino Bonavolontà, conductor; Stefano Arnaldi, Maurizio Moretti, piano, Comments by Jens-Peter Roeber, Editions Européennes (1988)
- Lao Silesu, Rapsodia sarda, Muse champêtre, Marcia funebre, Lamento, Orchestra da Camera "Ennio Porrino", Giacomo Medas, conductor, Comments by Jens-Peter Roeber, Editions Européennes (1989) He is buried at the Cimetière parisien de Pantin.
