= Dictionnaire biographique du mouvement ouvrier international =

Biographical dictionaries of the international labor movement

- Editor: Jean Maitron, Claude Pennetier
- Subject: Labor history
- Publisher: Editions de l'Atelier
- Publication date: 1971–2006

Dictionnaire biographique du mouvement ouvrier international (DBMOI, "Biographical Dictionary of the International Labor Movement") is a nine-volume labor movement biographical dictionary series edited by historian Jean Maitron and his successor Claude Pennetier. It extends the Dictionnaire biographique du mouvement ouvrier français to countries outside of France and is part of the collection together known as Le Maitron.

The online Dictionary, made available in 2018, includes 225,711 articles, sometimes enriched. The online database includes topical and national biographical collections covering regions such as Algeria, America, Africa, China, and Japan, as well as specific groups including Comintern activists, teachers, railroad workers, Spanish Civil War volunteers, and women.

== Bibliography ==
- Faligot, Roger (February 1, 1986). "Dictionnaire biographique du mouvement ouvrier international : la Chine". Le Monde diplomatique (in French).
- Flonneau, Jean-Marie (1991). "Review of Allemagne. Dictionnaire biographique du mouvement ouvrier international". Vingtième Siècle. Revue d'histoire (31): 98–99. doi:10.2307/3768648. ISSN 0294-1759. JSTOR 3768648.
- Fridenson, Patrick (1988). "Review of Dictionnaire biographique du mouvement ouvrier international : La Grande-Bretagne. tome I, tome II". Le Mouvement Social (144): 132–133. ISSN 0027-2671. JSTOR 23801240.
- Goldman, Rene (1986). "Review of La Chine. ('Dictionnaire Biographique du Mouvement Ouvrier International'; Jean Maitron, Editor in Chief.)". Pacific Affairs. 59 (4): 683–684. doi:10.2307/2758553. ISSN 0030-851X. JSTOR 2758553.
- Gordon, Andrew; Galano, Jean-Michel (1988). "Review of Dictionnaire Biographique du Mouvement Ouvrier International : Le Japon, tome I, tome II; Nihon shakai undô jinmei jiten". Le Mouvement Social (144): 131–132. ISSN 0027-2671. JSTOR 23801239.
- Hémery, Daniel (1988). "Review of Dictionnaire biographique du mouvement ouvrier international : la Chine". Le Mouvement Social (144): 134–138. ISSN 0027-2671. JSTOR 23801241.
- Leclerc, Jacques (1981). "Review of Mouvement ouvrier, communisme et nationalisme dans le monde arabe; Dictionnaire biographique du mouvement ouvrier international, Le Japon, t. I (A-L)". Revue d'histoire moderne et contemporaine (1954-). 28 (2): 389–392. ISSN 0048-8003. JSTOR 20528675.
- Marshall, Byron K. (1979). "Review of Biographical Dictionary of Japanese History.; Dictionnaire Biographique du Mouvement Ouvrier International: Le Japon, Tom 1.; Modern Japanese Literature in Translation: A Bibliography". The Journal of Asian Studies. 39 (1): 182–183. doi:10.2307/2053541. ISSN 0021-9118. JSTOR 2053541. S2CID 163559335.
- Messaoudi, Alain (2006). "Review of La République française et les indigènes. Algérie colonisée, Algérie algérienne (1870-1962); Algérie, engagements sociaux et questions coloniales. De la colonisation à l'indépendance de 1830 à 1962 (Dictionnaire biographique du mouvement ouvrier. Maghreb), René Gallissot". Studia Islamica (102/103): 227–230. ISSN 0585-5292. JSTOR 20141092.
- Mutel, Jacques (1979). "Review of Dictionnaire biographique du mouvement ouvrier international". Revue Historique. 262 (1 (531)): 224–226. ISSN 0035-3264. JSTOR 40953331.
- Rebérioux, Madeleine (1988). "Review of Dictionnaire biographique du mouvement ouvrier international : L'Autriche". Le Mouvement Social (144): 129–130. ISSN 0027-2671. JSTOR 23801238.
- Thénault, Sylvie (2007). "Review of Dictionnaire biographique du mouvement ouvrier: Maghreb. Algérie, engagements sociaux et question nationale. De la colonisation à l'indépendance de 1830 à 1962; La République française et les indigènes. Algérie colonisée, Algérie algérienne (1870-1962), René Gallissot". Vingtième Siècle. Revue d'histoire (96): 264. ISSN 0294-1759. JSTOR 20475200.
- Winock, Michel (1973). "Review of Dictionnaire biographique du mouvement ouvrier français Trosième partie : 1871-1914, tome 10, « A à Bou »; Dictionnaire biographique du mouvement ouvrier international, l'Autriche". Esprit (1940-). 424 (5): 1239–1240. ISSN 0014-0759. JSTOR 24262755.
