= Jean François Boursault-Malherbe =

French actor (1750–1842)

Jean-François Boursault called Boursault-Malherbe, (19 January 1750, Paris – 25 April 1842, Paris) was an 18th–19th-century French actor, playwright, theatre director, businessman and revolutionary.

== Works ==
- 1779: Les Réjouissances flamandes, divertissement en proses mingled with vaudevilles, Douai.
- 1780: Le Prix d'honneur, play in prose ornated with singing and vaudevilles, Caen.
- 1782: La Cour du Palermitain, divertissement in prose, accompanied with vaudevilles, Palerme.
- 1793: Boursault à ses concitoyens, en réponse au libelle des citoyens Godfert, Reverdy, Lenoble, L'Huillier, sculptor, Ponson, Génisson, Guérard, Josse, Dominé Sauvat, Paris, Imprimerie nationale exécutive du Louvre, 11 p.
- 1796: Sur le Système d'avilissement et de calomnie dont les ennemis de tout gouvernement ne cessent d'abreuver les députés qui ont été et sont encore au Corps législatif. Boursault à Robin-Marat, Paris, Imprimerie de C.-F. Cramer, 4 p.
- 1806: La Fille de quinze ans, comedy in 2 acts, imitée de l'anglois de Garrick, (Paris, Théâtre des Variétés-Étrangères, 29 November), A.-A. Renouard, 44 p.
- 1807: Le Schall, ou le Cachemire, comedy in 2 acts, imitée de l'anglais de Garrick, (Paris, Théâtre des Variétés-Étrangères, 23 December), Paris, A.-A. Renouard, 44 p.
- 1806: Les Deux Klingsberg, comedy in 5 acts, imitated from German of Kotzebue, (Paris, Théâtre des Variétés-Étrangères, 29 December), Paris, A.-A. Renouard, 86 p.
- 1807: Célestine, ou Amour et innocence, comedy in 4 acts, imitated from German of Soden (Paris, Théâtre des Variétés-Étrangères, 31 January), Paris, A.-A. Renouard, 1807, 78 p.
- 1807: Aurore ou la Fille de l'enfer, comedy in 3 acts, imitated from German of count von Saaüden, (Paris, Théâtre des Variétés-Étrangères, 6 February) Paris, A.-A. Renouard, 1807, 63 p.
- 1807: Le Spectre du château, heroic drama in 3 acts, imitated from English of Lewis (Paris, Théâtre des Variétés-Étrangères, 25 March), Paris, A.-A. Renouard, 1807, 68 p.
- 1807: C'était moi, comédy in 1 act, imitated from German of Kotzebue (Paris, Théâtre des Variétés-Étrangères, 25 May), Paris, A.-A. Renouard, 1807, 44 p.
- 1819: Notice sur la vie publique et privée de J-F Boursault-Malherbe, en réponse à quelques pamphlets, Paris, Imprimerie de Lebègue, 40 p.
- 1819: Observations pour servir de supplément à la Notice de M. Boursault par suite de l'appel interjeté par le sieur Bouvard, sur sa condamnation en police correctionnelle, Paris, Imprimerie de Lebègue, 80 p.
- 1819: Factum de M. Boursault contre ses calomniateurs, Paris, Imprimerie de Lebègue, 16 p.
- 1820: Affaire Boursault contre de Chalabre; - Conclusions de M. Boursault; - Aperçu de la situation de M. de chalabre avec la caisse des jeux; - Plainte du sieur Boursault sur la soustraction de 339,189 fr., Paris, 24 p.
- 1821: Indication de quelques pièces qui feront juger sur la véracité de l'auteur d'une pétition adressée à MM. les pairs de France et à MM. les députés des départements contre le fermier des jeux de Paris, Paris, Imprimerie de Vve J.-L. Scherff, 26 p.
- 1824: Considérations sur l'établissement des jeux publics, précédées d'Observations sur les jeux de hasard, Paris, Delaunay, 66 pages (signé « M. B***, ex-officier du génie »).
- 1832: Théâtre de l'Opéra-comique. Observations de l'un des propriétaires de la salle Ventadour, en réponse au discours prononcé par Monsieur le ministre du Commerce dans la séance de la Chambre des Députés du 1er mars 1832, Paris, Éverat, 7 p.
- 1833: Le Drame tel qu'il est, satire, Paris, tous les marchands de nouveautés, 15 p.
- 1833: L'Athée, sophisme, Paris, Imprimerie de Dezauche, 11 p.
- 1839: Épître à mon ami, qui se croyait athée, Paris, Imprimerie de Dezauche, 12 p.

== See also ==
- Edme Boursault, his great grandfather
- Rosier de Boursault

=== Bibliography ===
- Ernest Lebègue, Boursault-Malherbe; comédien, conventionnel, spéculateur, 1752-1842, F. Alcan, 1935, 277 pages
- « Boursault (rue) », dans Félix Lazare, Dictionnaire historique des rues et monuments de Paris, 1855 (rééd. Maisonneuve & Larose, 2003, 796 pages, p. 235)
- Adolphe Robert, Gaston Cougny (dir.), Dictionnaire des parlementaires français de 1789 à 1889, Paris, Bourloton, 1889, vol.1, p.450 et p.451
- François Joyaux, La Rose, une passion française (1778–1914), éditions Complexe, 2001, p. 86-88 (ISBN 2870278713)

=== External links ===
- Boursault-Malherbe on CÉSAR
- sa fiche sur le site de l'Assemblée Nationale
