= Le Maitron =

Labor movement biographical dictionaries

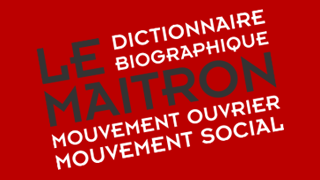
- Founder: Jean Maitron
- Honorary Director: Claude Pennetier
- Headquarters: Condorcet Campus, Aubervilliers
- Language: French
- Website: maitron.fr

Le Maitron is a set of labor movement biographical dictionaries compiled by historian Jean Maitron and his successor Claude Pennetier.

== Volumes ==
- Dictionnaire biographique du mouvement ouvrier français (DBMOF, "Biographical Dictionary of the French Labor Movement") – a 44-volume set published 1964–1997
  - Later released on CD-ROM
- Dictionnaire biographique du mouvement ouvrier international (DBMOI, "Biographical Dictionary of the International Labor Movement") – 9-volume set, extending to locales beyond France
- Dictionnaire biographique, mouvement ouvrier, mouvement social de 1940 à 1968 (DBMOMS, "Biographical Dictionary, Labor Movement, Social Movement")
- Dictionnaire des anarchistes

== Sources ==
- Pennetier, Claude (1994). "Le dictionnaire biographique du mouvement ouvrier français". Genèses. Sciences sociales et histoire (in French). 14 (1): 124–135. doi:10.3406/genes.1994.1219.
- Pennetier, Claude (1988). "Lire Le Maitron". Le Mouvement Social (in French) (144): 95–110. ISSN 0027-2671. JSTOR 23801235.
