= Edgar Bourloton =

French publisher (1844–1914)

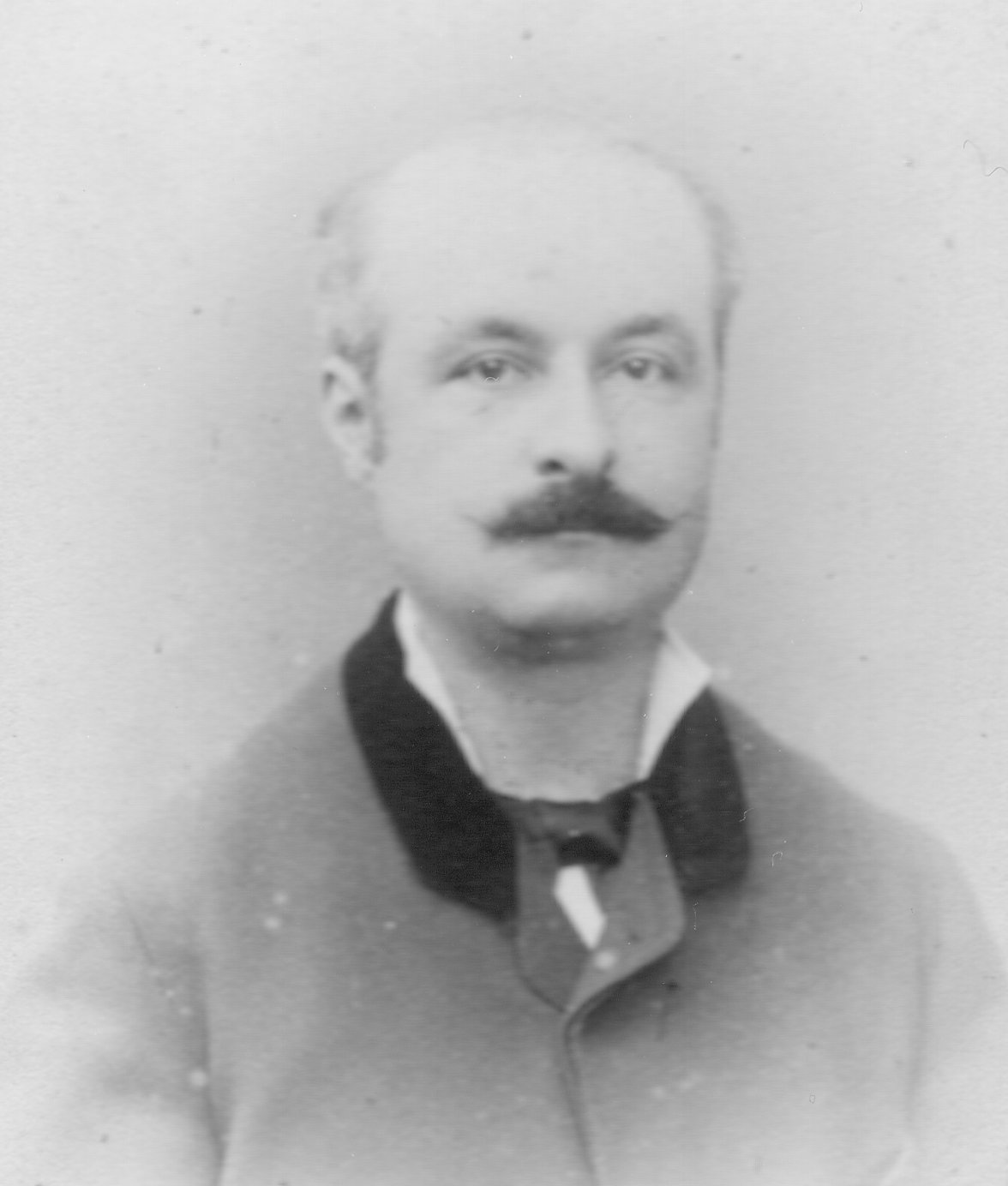

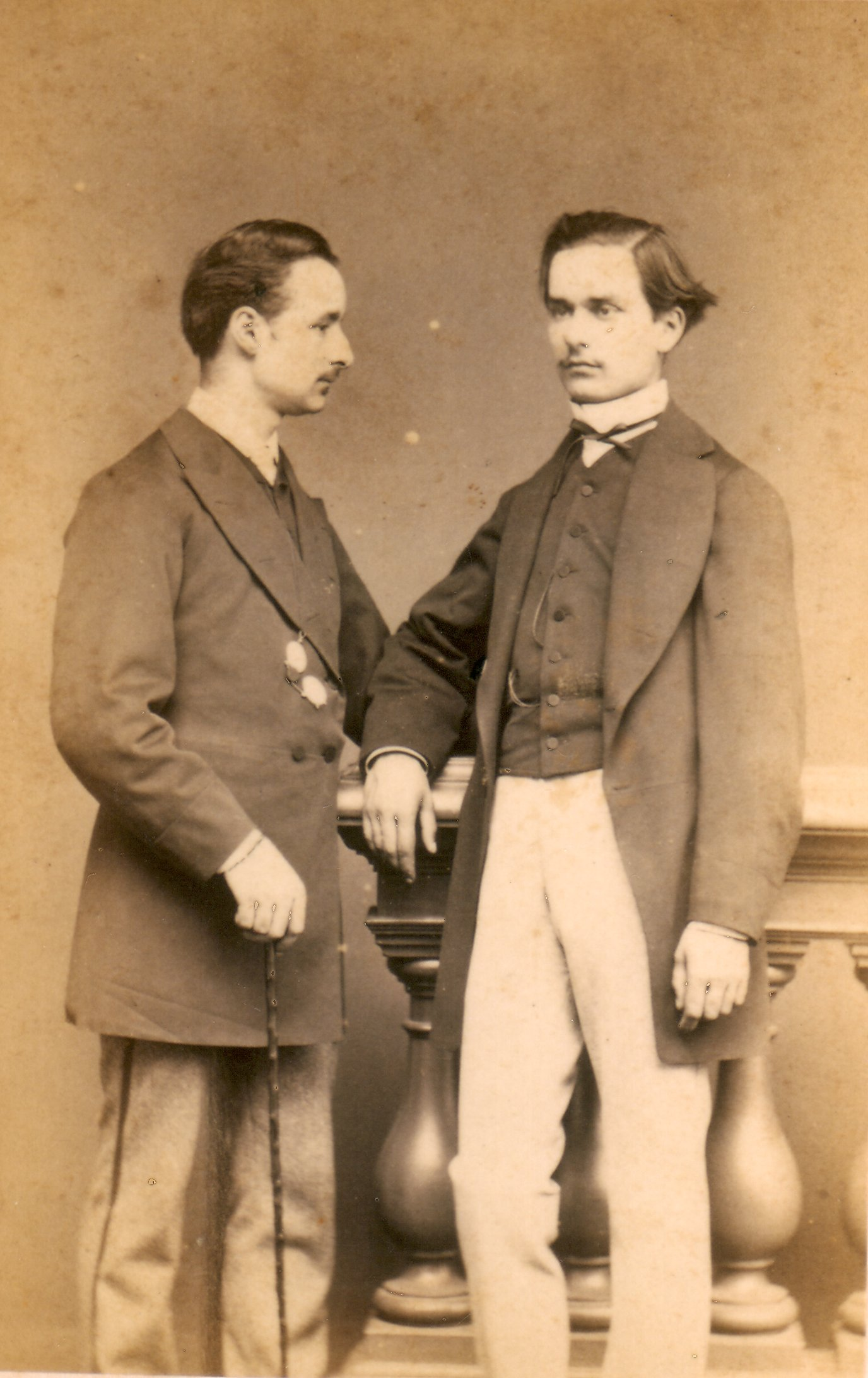
Edgar Bourloton and his brother Camille.

Edgar Bourloton (17 August 1844 – 15 March 1914) was a French publisher and historian.

== Life ==
Born in Fontenay-le-Comte, he was a son of Julie Zoé Rivet (1820–1871) and Louis Bourloton (1810–1888), professor of rhetoric at the college in that town and author of several scholarly works. Whilst very young he became very close to his mother. He studied law until gaining his lawyer's diploma, but never worked as one. Unlike his very Catholic family, he was noted for his Republican opinions.

On his mother's death Bourloton built her a tomb in Notre-Dame cemetery in Fontenay, showing her lying down — the only such effigy in the cemetery, it still survives. When the Franco-Prussian War broke out in 1870, Bourloton joined the elite zouave regiment in the elite Imperial Guard and was captured at the battle of Sedan.

He was held prisoner in Erfurt until freed thanks to a rich Jewish banker, possibly to act as his son's tutor. At the war's end, Bourloton and that rich young German for a grand tour of Italy. During his captivity he gathered observations he used later in his L'Allemagne contemporaine and whilst in Germany he also met Edmond Robert, with whom he published La Commune et ses idées à travers l'histoire in 1873.

On returning to France in 1872 he decided to buy the abbaye de Maillezais, site (among others) of the cathédrale Saint-Pierre de Maillezais. This was sold four years earlier on the death of Madame Pouey d'Avant and had fallen slowly into ruin — since the French Revolution its materials had been sold off little by little. With the inheritance from their mother, Edgar and Camille Bourloton (1848–1884), himself a member of the Papal Zouaves, decided to save any buildings on the site which they deemed to be of historical importance. After their death, the abbey was made a monument historique on 30 January 1924.

They also bought five hectares of land around the abbey. The monastery buildings were used by Camille and the rest of the episcopal palace by Edgar, who decided to build the present house there, inspired by his memories of Italy. His father Louis especially lived there until his death in 1888. The catalogue of his works is at Fontenay's town library.

From 1888 he contributed to the quarterly magazine la Revue du Bas-Poitou, edited by René Valette. He also published the Dictionnaire des parlementaires français edited by Adolphe Robert and Gaston Cougny (1889–1891).

Edgar lived on and off in Maillezais and was elected a municipal counsellor in the 1880s. He married Marguerite Rossignol, whose father was the notary in Vouillé - they had Pierre in 1884, Marguerite in 1885 and Marie in 1897. The whole family lived at 46 rue de Vaugirard in Paris, very close to the Sénat.

He also managed and published the Bulletin hebdomadaire de statistique municipale de la ville de Paris, edited by Jacques Bertillon and distributed by the librairie Masson. On his mother-in-law's death in 1911, Edgar left his family and went to live in Bourg-la-Reine, although his wife and Marguerite went to live in Breuil-l'Abbesse, a residence belonging to and probably built by the Rossignol grandparents - her grandfather Alexandre Rossignol (1816–1897) was notary there then justice of the peace in Poitiers.

Edgar left Bourg for Arcachon, where he died. He was buried on 19 March 1914. Rue Edgar-Bourloton in Maillezais is named after him

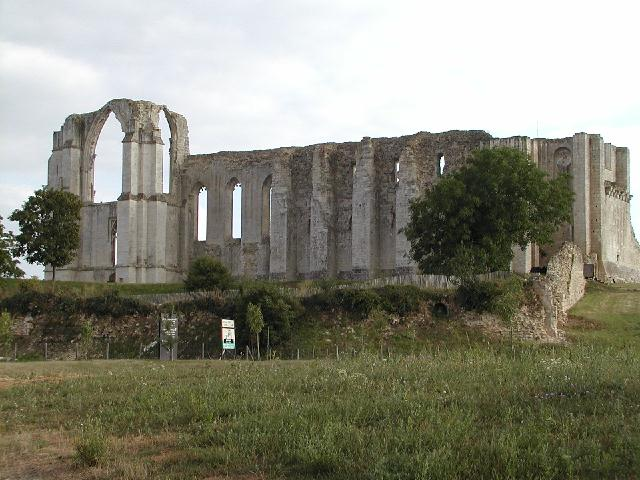
The ruins of the cathedral of Saint-Pierre in Maillezais.

== Selected works ==
- L'Allemagne contemporaine, par Edgar Bourloton, engagé volontaire de 1870 aux zouaves de la Garde, Paris, Germer Baillière, 1873, viii-284 p.
- La Commune et ses idées à travers l'histoire (in collaboration with Edmond Robert), Paris, Germer Baillière, 1873, 244 p., in-18
- L'Histoire de Maillezais, 1875 (surviving only in manuscript form, now in Poitiers' municipal library, eventually published in 2008 by éditions Le Thabor)
- Impressions de voyage en Bas-Poitou du citoyen La Vallée, ancien capitaine au 46e régiment, l'an III de la République. Vannes: E. Lafolye. 1888..
- Dictionnaire des Parlementaires by Adolphe Robert and Gaston Cougny, 5 vol., 1889–1891.
- Maillezais pendant la Révolution. Vannes: Lafolye. 1889. OCLC 457120847.
- Doléances des notaires de Fontenay-le-Comte en 1564, 1892.
- Nicolas Rapin d'après des documents inédits, Vannes, Lafolye, 1893.
- Francois Ambroise Rodrigue : évêque constitutionnel de la Vendée, Vannes, Lafolye, 1895, 21 p., in-8°
- Le Clergé de Fontenay-le-Comte pendant la Révolution, Vannes, Lafolye frères, 1894.
- Les Jansénistes en 1895. Paris: Vie Contemporaine. 1895. OCLC 401527889..
- Le Roi de la ligue à Maillezais : 6 septembre-15 octobre 1589 : documents inédits, Vannes, Lafolye, 1896.
- M. Goupilleau, curé de Fenouiller : 1788-1822 : souvenirs de la Révolution, Vannes, Lafolye, 1897.
- Encore un mot sur les origines de l'imprimerie à Poitiers. Vannes. 1897. OCLC 558166210..
- Le Clergé de la Vendée pendant la Révolution. Vannes: Lafolye frères. 1898. OCLC 558166198..
- Les Anciennes Seigneuries du Bas-Poitou : la seigneurie de Vouvant, Vannes, Lafolye frères, 1902.
- La Cocarde obligatoire en 1798. S.l. OCLC 14392950..

=== Extracts from the Revue du Bas-Poitou ===
- La Croisade prêchée dans le diocèse de Maillezais en 1517 et 1518. Vannes: Lafolye. 1896. OCLC 457120839.
- La Nomination des évêques au xve siècle. Frédéric de Saint-Séverin, évêque de Maillezais, 1481-1511, Vannes, Lafolye frères, 1905, 16 p., 25 cm (OCLC 759745152)
- Le général Belliard. Vannes: Lafolye. OCLC 759745151.
- Le Pontificat d'Étienne Loyseau, évêque de Luçon. Vannes: Lafolye. 1895. OCLC 458678983.

== Selected articles ==
- « Contribution à l'histoire de Fontenay-le-Comte », La Revue du Bas-Poitou et des Provinces de l’Ouest, volume IV, 1891, p. 308-314.
- « Comment finirent les régicides », Le Correspondant, 25 janvier et 10 février 1892.
- « Une grève des nourrices à Niort en 1781 », La Revue du Bas-Poitou et des Provinces de l’Ouest, 1893.
- « L'Évolution syndicale », 1893.
- « Les Députés et les sénateurs de la Vendée de 1789 à 1902 », La Revue du Bas-Poitou et des Provinces de l’Ouest.
- « La Longévité des Parlementaires », La Revue contemporaine, 1 décembre 1895.
- « L’Inscription gallo-romaine de Civray, près de Maillezais », La Revue du Bas-Poitou et des Provinces de l’Ouest, 1900, volume XIII, p. 197-200.
- « Le Pont des Moutiers sur le Lay en 1624 », La Revue du Bas-Poitou et des Provinces de l’Ouest, vol. 14, 1901.
- « Le Portus Secor et les fouilles de La Gachère », Saintes, Revue de Saintonge et d’Aunis, juillet 1901.
- « La Seigneurie de Fontenay-le-Comte », 1902.
- « Les Riverains du Lay en 1705 », La Revue du Bas-Poitou et des Provinces de l’Ouest, 1902, p. 34.
- « La taille a-t-elle diminué en Bas-Poitou ? », La Revue du Bas-Poitou et des Provinces de l’Ouest, 1902, p. 157-161.
- « Nos morts : M. Charles Farcinet », La Revue du Bas-Poitou et des Provinces de l’Ouest, 1903, p. 419.
- « La Chambre de lecture de Saint-Gilles-sur-Vie », La Revue du Bas-Poitou et des Provinces de l’Ouest, vol. 17, 1904.
- « La Vendée au salon de 1902, 1903, 1904 et 1905 », La Revue du Bas-Poitou et des Provinces de l’Ouest, vol. 15, 16, 17 et 18, 1902, 1903, 1904 et 1905.

== Bibliography ==
- Hervé Fayat and Nathalie Bayon, « Le Robert et Cougny et l’invention des parlementaires », Revue d'histoire du xixe siècle, no 33, 2006, p. 55-78 (ISSN 1777-5329)
