= Gaston Cougny =

French lawyer and historian

Antoine Jean Armand Gaston Cougny (5 December 1857 – 5 July 1908) better known as Gaston Cougny was a French lawyer and historian. He and Adolphe Robert co-edited the Dictionnaire des parlementaires français (1889–1891). He also contributed to several political newspapers such as La Vérité, Le Radical and La France libre and took part in the creation of La Commune.

== Life ==
He was born in Bourges to a principal inspector of Paris's Écoles de dessin, who then rose to be counsellor general. He was a barrister in Bourges and art history professor in the municipal schools in Paris from 1886 to 1902, before being made director of Bourges' École nationale des arts appliqués à l'industrie de Bourges in 1902.

In 1878 he became Louis Blanc's secretary, collaborating around the same time on Le Réveil social, a socialist daily newspaper. He entered politics in the 1880s in the wake of Édouard Vaillant, belonging to Bourges' socialist committee, affiliated to the Central Revolutionary Committee set up in 1881, even though his ideas and training drew him closer to Félix Pyat, then led the reformist current of the Socialist Revolutionary Party, formed in 1898.

He was the socialist candidate for Cher in the legislative elections of 1885 and 1898, in which he came close to victory in the second round. In 1900 he headed the list of candidates for the Bourges municipal elections, which were won by the socialists and was elected municipal counsellor in the first round on 6 May. He was then put in charge of education on the municipal council until 1902. After a final defeat in the legislative elections of 1902, representing the French Socialist Party, he abandoned politics, dying in Bourges of cholera.

== Works ==
- Promenades au Musée du Louvre (vol. 1 : La Peinture; vol. 2 : Les Dessins, la Sculpture), Paris, Librairie de l'Art, 1888.
- L'Enseignement professionnel des beaux-arts dans les écoles de la ville de Paris, Paris, Quantin, 1888, IV-332 pages.
- Bijoux italiens, allemands et hongrois de l'époque de la Renaissance, ayant figuré à l'Exposition d'orfèvrerie de Budapest. Texte historique et descriptif, Paris, Librairie centrale des beaux-arts, 1889.
- avec Adolphe Robert : Dictionnaire des parlementaires français depuis le 1er mai 1789 jusqu'au 1er mai 1889 Tome 1, Tome 2, Tome 3, Tome 4, Tome 5.
- L'Art antique : Choix de lectures sur l'histoire de l'art, l'esthétique et l'archéologie (vol. 1 : Égypte, Chaldée, Assyrie, Perse, Asie-Mineure, Phénicie; vol. 2 : La Grèce, Rome), Firmin-Didot, 1892–1893.
- L'art au Moyen Âge : origines de l'art chrétien, l'art byzantin, l'art musulman, l'art gothique : choix de lectures sur l'histoire de l'art, l'esthétique et l'archéologie accompagné de notes explicatives, historiques et bibliographiques, Paris, Firmin-Didot, 1894, 308 pages.
- Albums-manuels d'histoire de l'art. L'Antiquité, Paris, Firmin-Didot, 1894, VIII-273 pages.
- L'Art moderne: Choix de lectures sur l'histoire de l'art, l'esthétique et l'archéologie (vol. 1 : La Renaissance; vol. 2: xviiie et xixe siècles), Paris, Firmin-Didot, 1895–1896.

== Bibliography (in French) ==
- Maurice Dommanget, Édouard Vaillant un grand socialiste 1840–1915, La Table ronde, 1956, 529 pages.
- Hervé Fayat and Nathalie Bayon, « Le « Robert et Cougny » et l’invention des parlementaires », Revue d'histoire du XIXe siecle, 33/2006 Read online
- Jean Maitron, Dictionnaire biographique du mouvement ouvrier français, Éditions ouvrières, volume 11 : « Bou à Del », 1973, 349 p.
- Claude Pennetier, Le socialisme dans le Cher, 1851–1921, Delayance, 1982.
