= Dictionnaire des anarchistes =

2014 reference work

- Author: Claude Pennetier
- Subject: Biographical dictionary, anarchists in France
- Publisher: Editions de l'Atelier
- Publication date: 2014
- Pages: 528

Dictionnaire des anarchistes is a biographical dictionary of anarchists in France published in 2014 within the Le Maitron series.

== Publication ==
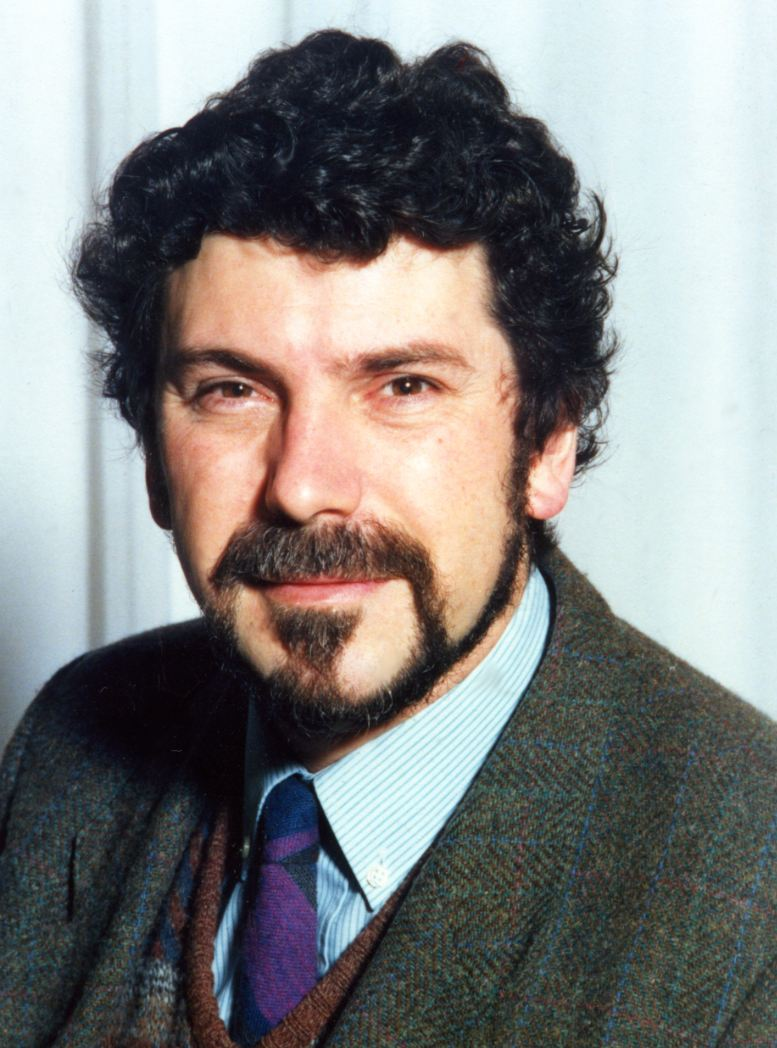
Maitron director Claude Pennetier

Le Maitron is a series of reference works: a 44-volume biographical dictionary of the French workers' movement, with additional volumes based on period, region (outside France), and theme. The Dictionnaire des anarchistes, on the anarchists, is one such thematic volume. The work was originally conceived between historian Michel Dreyfus, Radio Libertaire host Hugues Lenoir, and Maitron director Claude Pennetier in 2006 and compiled by libertarian (anarchist) historians and activists from Alternative libertaire, Anarchist Federation (France), Coordination des groupes anarchistes, and Confédération nationale du travail. The work was originally expected for release in 2011.

== Bibliography ==
- Ben Ytzhak, Lydia (October 9, 2014). "Les anarchistes ont leur Who's Who". CNRS Le journal (in French).
- Bentz, Luc (January 10, 2014). "Le Maitron des anarchistes : un projet participatif". Centre Henri-Aigueperse UNSA Éducation (in French).
- Clarini, Julie (June 3, 2015). "Claude Pennetier : « Dans la tradition anarchiste, une attention portée à l'individu »". Le Monde.fr (in French).
- Kauffer, Rémi (June 26, 2014). "Graines d'anars". Historia (in French).
- Roy, Didier (September 1, 2015). "Les Anarchistes. Dictionnaire biographique du mouvement libertaire francophone". Le Monde diplomatique (in French).
