= République du Croissant =

Nickname for Paris's press district

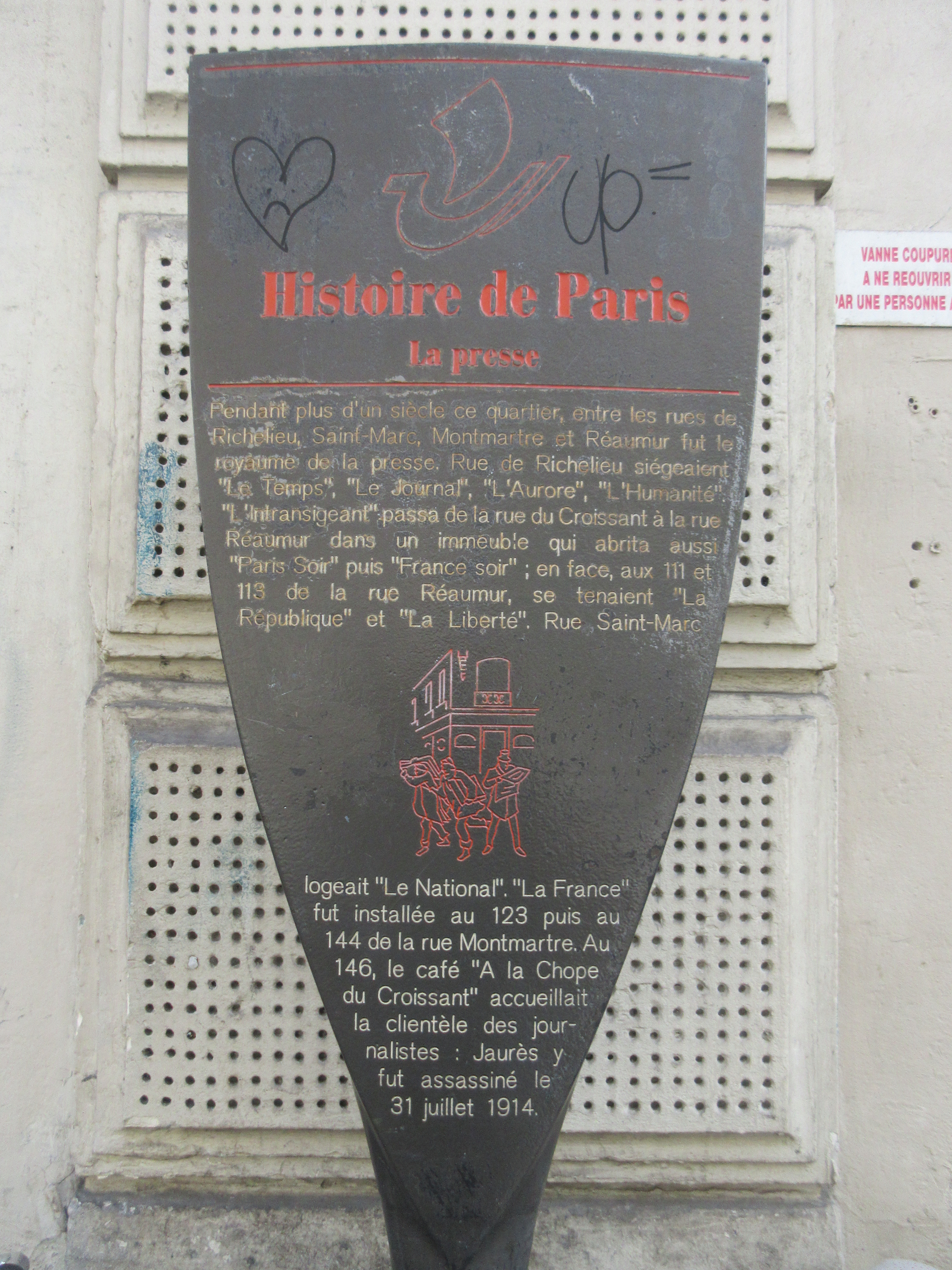
Panneau Histoire de Paris : "The Press".

The République du Croissant (literally 'Republic of the Croissant') was a nickname for Paris's press district, akin to Fleet Street in London. The term originated late in the 19th century for the area between Réaumur and Opéra in the 2nd arrondissement which housed most of the major French newspapers of the time. Several newspapers and press agencies retain premises in the area even today.

== History ==
The district was centred on the junction between rue du Croissant and rue Montmartre, site of the café du Croissant, which on 31 July 1914 saw the assassination of Jean Jaurès, founder and director of L'Humanité. In the district major press businesses tried to establish rules and means for their economic development, such as issuing cards to those who delivered and resold newspapers.

Not far from the Bourse and Grands boulevards, the district housed most of Paris's newspaper presses and newsrooms, where journalists and press barons set up organisations such as Edgar Monteil's Association syndicale professionnelle des journalistes républicains français (ASPJRF) This was a boom era for the French press – in 1914 it was the most widely-read in the world with 244 copies for every 1,000 inhabitants. and well-known reporters such as Pierre Giffard, Jules Huret, Gaston Leroux, Pierre Mille, Séverine and Fernand Xau.

At the time the French media scene was dominated by four daily newspapers published in Paris – Le Matin, Le Petit Parisien under Albert Londres and Jean Dupuy, Le Petit Journal and Le Journal.

== Timeline ==
- In 1825, Charles-Louis Havas, ruined by the 1825 crisis at the London Stock Exchange, set up the Bureau de traduction des journaux étrangers, later known as the Bureau de nouvelles, at 4 rue Jean-Jacques Rousseau.
- In 1832, the Gazette des chemins de fer, revived in 1855 by Jacques Bresson, also known as "Cours général des actions", set up offices at 31 place de la Bourse.
- In 1853, L'Illustration set up offices at 60 rue de Richelieu.
- In 1863, Le Petit Journal set up offices at 112 rue Richelieu before moving to rue Lafayette and rue Cadet.
- In 1854, La Semaine financière was founded at 83 rue de Richelieu.
- In 1857, Le Monde illustré was founded at 15 boulevard des Italiens.
- In 1873, Le Soleil (quotidiIn français) set up offices on rue du Croissant.
- In 1874, the Agence de presse Fournier was created at 1 rue de la Bourse.
- In 1874, La France set up offices at 142 rue Montmartre and Le Figaro at 26 rue Drouot.
- In 1875, La Petite République française moved into 53 Rue de la Chaussée-d'Antin.
- In 1876, the société Debons started printing L'Ordre, Le Pays, La République française, La Patrie at 16, rue du Croissant.
- In juillet 1877, the Journal des voyages set up offices at 7 rue du Croissant.
- In 1878, Le Petit Parisien left 11 rue du Faubourg-Montmartre for 18 rue d'Enghien.
- In 1879, Le Petit Parisien set up its press at 18 rue d'Enghien in the flat of Jean Dupy.
- Until 1880, the printer Dubuisson printed Le Figaro, La Gazette de France and Le Bien public at 18 Rue Coq-Héron
- In 1882, the daily newspaper Le Gaulois, formerly at 9 boulevard des Italiens then 22 boulevard Montmartre, moved to 2 rue Drouot.
- 1884
  - On 1 January Le Radical left 10 rue Saint-Joseph to move into a new building originally built for La France at 19 rue du Croissant and 142–144 rue Montmartre.
- On 26 February the daily newspaper Le Matin set up its head office at 6, boulevard Poissonnière, and offices at number 3 and 9 on the same street.
- In 1890, Le Pour et le Contre moved into 178 rue Montmartre.
- In 1892, Le Journal moved into 100 rue de Richelieu.
- From 1892 to 1900, La Libre Parole, under Édouard Drumont had offices at 14 boulevard Montmartre.
- In 1896, the Cours de la Bourse et de la Banque, previously known as Cote Desfossés edited by Victor Antoine Desfossés, set up offices in 31 place de la Bourse, in the former home of the Gazette des chemins de fer under Jacques Bresson.
- In 1896, Agence Havas set up offices at 8 place de la Bourse.
- In 1899, the daily newspaper L'Information was founded at 124, rue Réaumur, by its director Léon Chavenon.
- In 1902, L'Écho de Paris left 2 rue Taitbout to move to 6 place de l'Opéra.
- In 1912, Le Temps left 5 boulevard des Italiens to move to 5–7 rue des Italiens which became the address for Le Monde.
- In 1932, Paris-Soir left 11 boulevard Montmartre for 34 rue du Louvre.
- In 1945, France-Soir was founded at 98–100 rue Réaumur.
- In 1979, the new monthly newspaper Mieux vivre votre argent set up offices at 32 rue Notre-Dame-des-Victoires.
- In 1985, La Tribune was founded at 106–108 rue de Richelieu, near L'Agefi, bought a year earlier by Bruno Bertez.
- In 1990, Le Monde left 5–7 rue des Italiens.
- In 1992, La Tribune and La Cote Desfossés merged at 46 rue Notre-Dame-des-Victoires.
- In 1998, Indigo Publications (La Lettre du Continent, La Lettre de l'océan Indien, etc.) set up offices at 142 rue Montmartre.
- In 2004, La Tribune moved to 12 rue Vivienne.
- In 2006, Les Échos moved to 6, rue du Quatre-Septembre.

=== Other sites ===
- La Presse, initially at 11 rue Saint-Georges, moved to 123 rue Montmartre, then to 12 rue du Croissant, then to 48 rue de Richelieu.
- La France libre under Adolphe Maujan had its offices at 12 rue du Croissant.
- L'Aurore was at 142 rue Montmartre.
- In July 1898 the offices of Droits de l'homme moved to 142 rue Montmartre.
- L'Humanité was at 142 rue Montmartre before Jean Jaurès moved it to 16 rue du Croissant.
- La Lanterne was at 5 rue Coq-Héron.
- Le Nouvel Observateur was at 10/12 place de la Bourse.
- The major French regional daily newspapers set up offices on the Grands boulevards before establishing a "Hall des grands régionaux" at 25 boulevard Poissonnière in 1912.

=== Main presses under the Second Empire ===
- 16 rue du Croissant
- 5 rue Coq-Héron
- 123 rue Montmartre
- 10 Rue du Faubourg-Montmartre
- 41 rue Jean-Jacques-Rousseau
- 12 Rue de la Grange-Batelière
- 9 rue d'Aboukir
- 20 rue Bergère

Under the Belle Époque the press district had around a hundred typographic presses of various sizes.

=== Theatre, opera and food ===
The area was expanding in the 19th century, as it was outside the tax farmers' wall. As such, it gained prestigious restaurants, brasseries, theatres and opera houses.

The Théâtre national de l'Opéra-Comique set up Salle Favart on 28 April 1783 in the gardens of the Hôtel de Choiseul (Paris), on a site intended for the Caisse d'Escompte, then in 1801 merged with the neighbouring Théâtre Feydeau. In 1827 it moved next door to become the Théâtre des Nouveautés, Place de la Bourse, then in 1829 into the Salle Ventadour. On 13 February 1820 the duc de Berry's murder as he left the opéra de la rue de Richelieu opposite the Théâtre Louvois led Louis XVIII to order its demolition. The Opéra Le Peletier replaced it a year later in the gardens of the Hôtel Laborde, but burned down in 1873, a year before the opening of the Palais Garnier.

For dining there were Café Gobillard, Restaurant Champeaux, Brasserie Gallopin, Café Tortoni and Café des arcades, all around the Place de la Bourse, with La sole Marguery also on boulevard de Bonne-Nouvelle and the Maison Dorée under Casimir Moisson at 20 Boulevard des Italiens.

== Bibliography ==
- (in French) Alfred Sirven (1866). Journaux et journalistes: La Presse – La Liberté, avec les portraits des rédacteurs photographiés par Pierre Petit. Cournol.
