= Manzanares Train Robbery =

1872 train robbery in La Mancha, Southern Spain

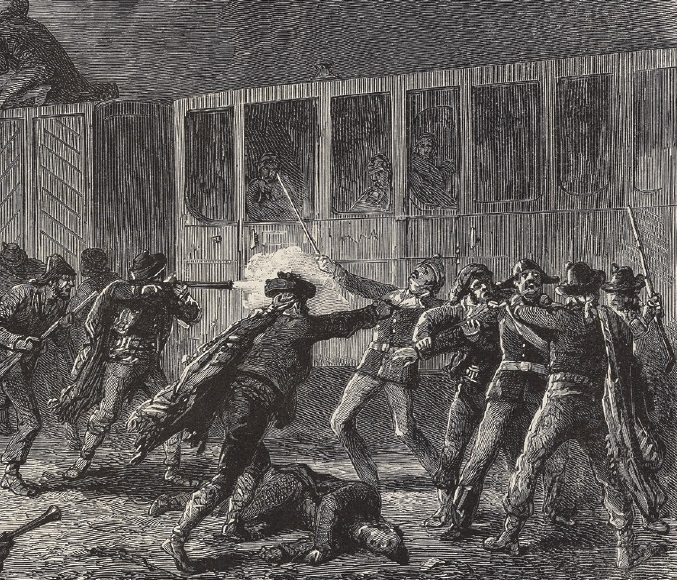
- Illustration about the Manzanares Train Robbery in Spain in the L’Illustration, Journal Universel
- Date: March 30–March 31, 1872
- Location: between Manzanares and Valdepeñas in province of Ciudad Real (now autonomous community Castilla–La Mancha of Spain)
- Participants: 25 bandits maybe from the Sierra de Siles
- Deaths: 1
- Injuries: 2

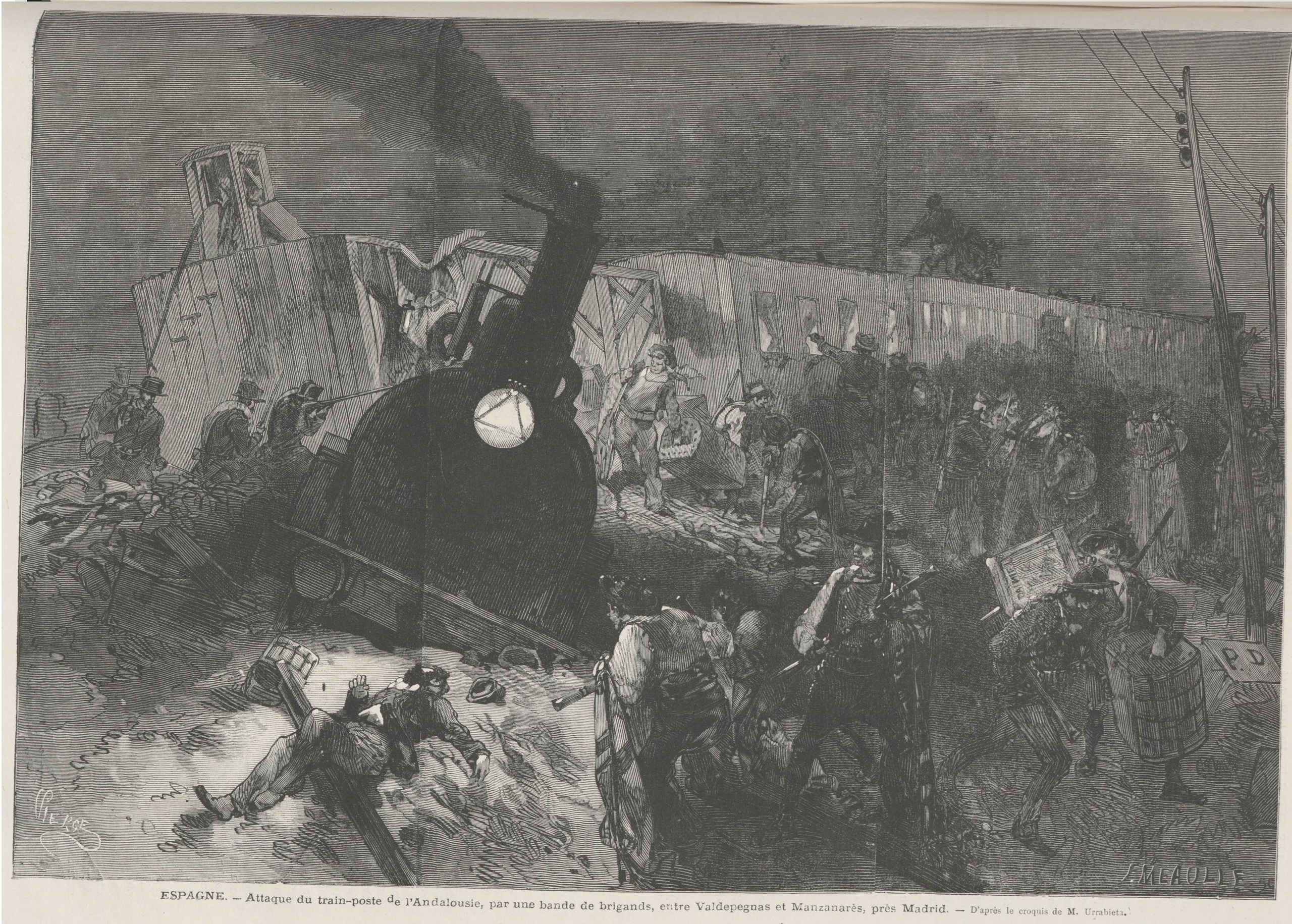
French illustration about the Manzanares Train Robberry

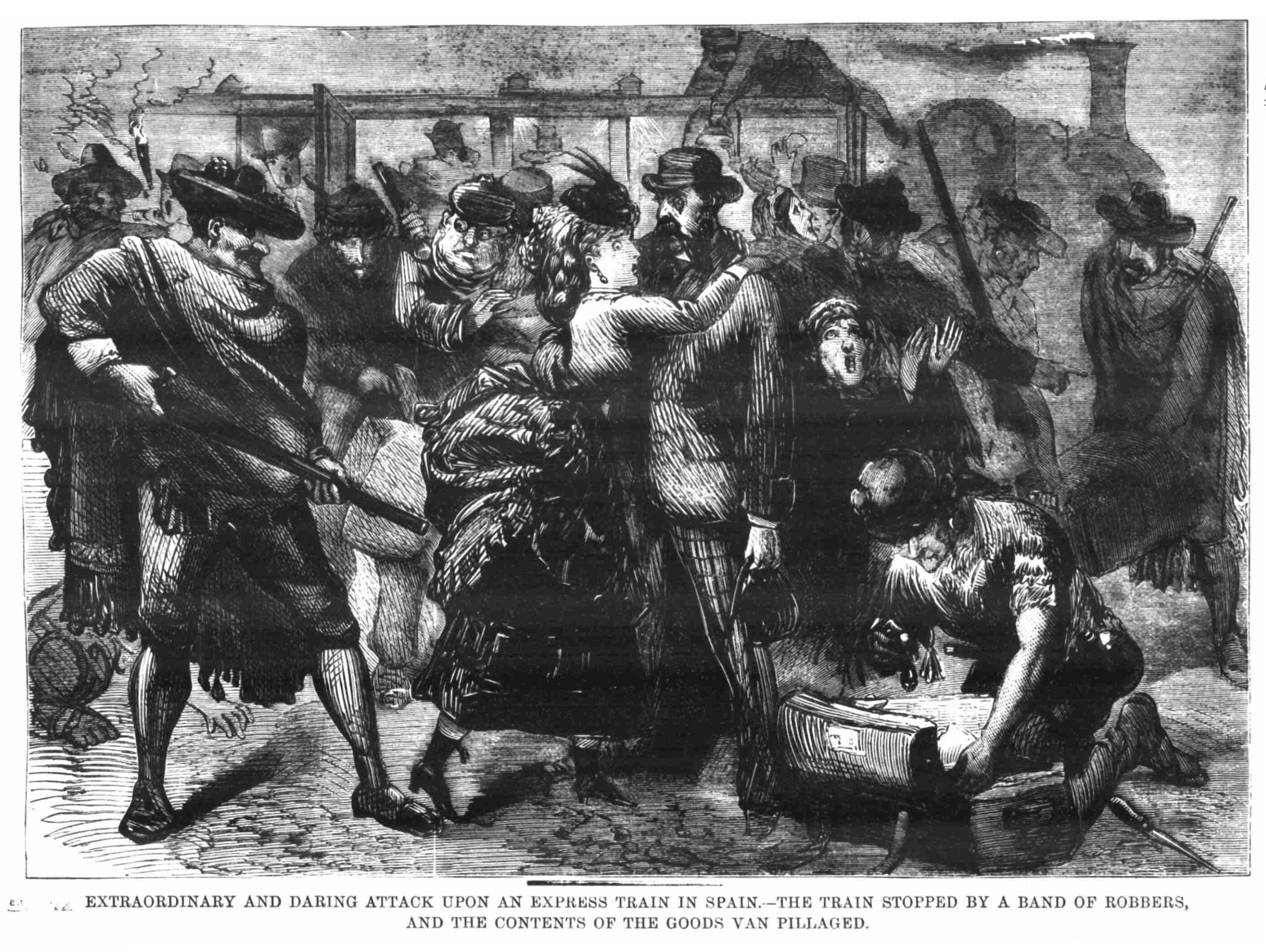
Illustration of the British newspaper The Day’s Doing about the robbery. The image is based on false information that the passengers were taken off the train by robbers

The Manzanares Train Robbery occurred in La Mancha in Southern Spain from dawn on March 30 to dawn on March 31, 1872 when the Andalusia to Madrid mail train was robbed between Manzanares and Valdepeñas in province of Ciudad Real. The crime received a great deal of attention in the world press at the time, which may have been due to the fact that Spain was on the verge of the Third Carlist War (1872-1876), and was therefore the focus of increased foreign attention. Due to the deteriorating public security situation, the Spanish central government at the time faced a lot of harsh criticism, including in connection with the robbery. Since those responsible for the crime were not found and thus not punished, the train robbery also contributed to the further escalation of tensions and the outbreak of war.

== Prelude ==
After the Peninsular War, interest in Spain increased, so many travelers visited the country's regions, which is how romantic clichés that still exist today were formed. The case of the Manzanares Train Robbery even fit well into these clichés: travelers had long ago formed idealized images of bandits with a terrifying, yet sensual and overwhelming appearance.

Contemporary accounts describe La Mancha as an extremely poor but picturesque region, and sometimes they even exaggerate this poverty to the point that they say even robbers would starve to death here. Alexandre Dumas also describes Manzanares and nearby Valdepeñas as a poor region, although he praises the beauty of the women, the good wines, and the handsome matadors.

The economy of the area had already been badly damaged by the Peninsular War and the First and Second Carlist War, crime was rampant and numerous gangs of robbers were organized. Due to the impending war, army forces and Civil Guard were redirected to the capital and the various provincial capitals, leaving virtually no armed forces to ensure public order in the countryside.

The Spanish railway company Metodía, which also operated the line near Manzanares and Ciudad Real, received a tip-off that a gang of robbers might be preparing to attack one of the trains on the Andalusian section, so the director warned the government. Later, the commander of Civil Guard in Ciudad Real also tried in vain to request permission to send units to protect the sections, after he also learned of the possible attack.

== Robbery ==
=== Preparations ===
The train robbery gang, which had 25 members, attacked the mail train traveling between Manzanares and Valdepeñas halfway, at a railway stop next to a tavern called Consolación. At 21:00 in the evening on March 30, the bandits captured two guards at the railway station and forced them to signal the approaching locomotive to stop. Before that, they even picked up part of the rails and even pushed the wheeled guardhouse onto the track to form a blockade. A few hours later, at 0:15, the mail train was approaching from Andalusia. However, the train driver did not know what to make of the signal and did not stop, which caused the train to derail.

=== The attack ===
The bandits opened fire on the locomotive from rifles and blunderbusses, from where the locomotive driver and stoker fled and tried to bring help. Apart from the passengers, there were only two members of the Civil Guard and a military officer, José Manuel Lalama, on the train. One Guardia Civile returned fire from the train, while the other Guardia and Lalama got off the train and confronted the gang, which was outnumbered by about ten times. Three bandits jumped onto the wagon and they shot through the window, seriously wounding the Guardia in his eye and face. Lalama attacked the bandits with a sword and was eventually shot in the shoulder. The other Guardia was captured by the bandits. An actor from Granada tried to help Lalama and the Guardias. The man was shot at point blank range, making him the only fatality of the train robbery.

=== Removing the money and other valuables ===
Although contemporary newspapers reported that the gang had sent the passengers off the train, in reality, once the resistance had ceased, they did not care about them, merely taking their money and other valuables and looting the baggage car. No one was hurt, but the robbers made it clear that no one should try to escape. The civilians did not offer any resistance, instead trying to hide in the wagons. When some were brave enough to venture out, all they saw were the bandits leaving with the loot. The Civil Guard and the military only learned of the train robbery late, because the retreating bandits had also cut the telegraph wires.

=== Raising the alarm ===
The news of the robbery did not reach the Civil Guard in Manzanares until 3:00 a.m.; the commander immediately went after the robbers. The railway company sent a replacement convoy to the scene, which included the company doctor, their engineer, and the alcalde of Manzanares, Luis Angulo. At the scene, one of the travelers, a doctor, Dr. Santero, was already providing care to the wounded.

Lieutenant Lalama survived the attack and was promoted for his heroism. However, the shot Guardia was blinded by his injury. The passengers and their luggage were transferred to the other train, but they were only able to continue their journey at 7:00 in the morning and arrived in Madrid at 14:00 in the afternoon. The Civil Guard pursuing the bandits found traces of the gang near the Sierra de Siles and near Bolaños de Calatrava. Discarded fake beards and fake hair were found here, which the gang members used to disguise themselves so that no one would recognize them in the area later. They also found some lost coins and broken safes. The tracks were eventually lost in a wooded area.

== Press coverage ==
The train robbery was featured on the front pages of numerous contemporary newspapers in United Kingdom, German Empire, France, Italy, and the United States, often with illustrations illustrating the events, which indicates the prominent role of the case. Brief reviews appeared as early as April 2 in The New York Herald, Chicago Tribune, New Orleans Republic, La République française, The Echo, and Pall Mall Gazette. In the following days, there was general interest in the Manzanares Train Robbery, so Spanish newspaper articles were translated or local correspondents sent the news directly.

Some newspaper articles somewhat colored the events, creating an idealized image of the bandits. The New York Dispatch's article describes the alleged leader of the gang as a young, handsome, pleasant, and polite man who defeated a Guardia in a duel-like fight, sparing his life. The French Le Rappel emphasizes the leader's alleged French origin, as they wanted to claim the gallant robber leader as their own.

However, there are several inaccuracies in these articles and reports. According to illustrations published in the newspapers L'Univers illustré or The Penny, the train was attacked in a mountainous landscape, but in reality the crime scene was on a plain. Several articles claim that the train robbery was carried out by a gang of criminals named José María el Tempranillo, who were hiding in the Sierra Morena. However, it is much more likely that his robbery was committed by a gang hiding in the Montes de Toledo. The misunderstanding may have been caused by the robbers first heading for the Sierra Morena to deceive the Guardias Civiles. Later they changed direction towards the Sierra de Siles, which is located in the direction of Toledo.

The value of the damage resulting from the robbery is also estimated differently. Foreign sources mention a horrific amount, between 125 and 200 thousand pesetas, while Spanish sources say the robbers stole 40 or 50 thousand pesetas.

Most of the articles express harsh criticism of the Spanish government and securities. The New York Dispatch highlights the government's lack of credibility by saying that there are one hundred and fifty thousand soldiers, militiamen, and Guardias Civiles available in the country, but they cannot control these robber gangs, which are mainly rampaging in the southern parts of the country. The Civil Guard investigated the case with great haste due to its worldwide repercussions, and a few months later they arrested about twenty people suspected of the robbery, who were imprisoned in Ciudad Real prison, but as no evidence was found against them, they were released in January 1873. Even the monarchist Spanish newspapers themselves spoke condemningly of the authorities and the government, drawing parallels between the Manzanares Train Robbery and attacks on trains in the United States.

The perpetrators of the Manzanares Train Robbery were never caught or prosecuted, and the incident reignited tensions in Spain. Three weeks later, the Third Carlist War broke out.

The incident inspired other bandits throughout Spain, but especially in La Mancha, to carry out more attacks on trains.
