= Georgette (disambiguation) =

Georgette is a feminine given name. It may also refer to:

- Georgette (fabric), a sheer, lightweight crepe fabric
- Hurricane Georgette (disambiguation), nine tropical cyclones in the Eastern Pacific Ocean
- SS Georgette, a steamship built in 1872
- Operation Georgette, a German World War I plan resulting in the Battle of the Lys (1918)
