= Histoire du mouvement anarchiste en France (1800–1914) =

1951 book by Jean Maitron

- Author: Jean Maitron
- Subject: Anarchism in France, labor history
- Publisher: Societe Universitaire d'Editions et de Librairie
- Publication date: 1951

Histoire du mouvement anarchiste en France (1800–1914) is a 1951 history book of the anarchist movement in France by Jean Maitron, a historian specialist of the labour movement.

== Bibliography ==
- Bowditch, John (1958). "Review of Histoire du Mouvement Anarchiste en France, 1880-1914; The Second International, 1889-1914". The Journal of Economic History. 18 (3): 369–370. doi:10.1017/S0022050700107429. ISSN 0022-0507. JSTOR 2114225. S2CID 153954951.
- Bury, J. P. T. (1953). "Review of Histoire du mouvement anarchiste en France (1880-1914)". The English Historical Review. 68 (266): 106–108. doi:10.1093/ehr/LXVIII.CCLXVI.106. ISSN 0013-8266. JSTOR 555135.
- Dolléans, E. (1951). "Review of Histoire du Mouvement anarchiste en France: 1880-1914". L'Année sociologique (1940/1948-). 5: 143–146. ISSN 0066-2399. JSTOR 27884819.
- Fournier, Roger (1952). "L'HISTOIRE DU MOUVEMENT ANARCHISTE EN FRANCE (1880-1914) de Jean Maitron". Revue d'histoire économique et sociale. 30 (3): 313–314. ISSN 0035-239X. JSTOR 24068725.
- "Review of Histoire du mouvement anarchiste en France (1880-1914). 2 e éd. revue et illustrée". Revue des Sciences philosophiques et théologiques. 41 (1): 203–204. 1957. ISSN 0035-2209. JSTOR 44411586.
- Richet, Jacques (1952). "Review of Histoire du Mouvement anarchiste en France (1880-1914)". Esprit. 197 (12): 1015–1016. ISSN 0014-0759. JSTOR 24468689.
- Schapiro, J. Salwyn (1952). "Review of Histoire du mouvement anarchiste en france (1880-1914)". The American Historical Review. 58 (1): 102–103. doi:10.1086/ahr/58.1.102. ISSN 0002-8762. JSTOR 1844810.
