= Georgette =

Georgette is a feminine given name, the French form of Γεωργία (Geōrgia), the feminine form of George.

Georgette may refer to:

== People ==
- Georgette Barry (1919–2003), stage name Andrea King, American actress
- Georgette Bauerdorf (1924–1944), American socialite, heiress and murder victim
- Georgette Berger (1901–1986), Belgian model
- Georgette Berube (1927–2005), American politician
- Georgette Bouillot (1892–1972), French embroiderer and trade unionist
- Georgette Chen (1906–1993), Singaporean painter
- Georgette Délibrias (1924–2015), pioneered radiocarbon dating
- Georgette Gómez (born 1975), American politician and community activist
- Georgette Harvey (1882–1952), African-American singer and actress
- Georgette Heyer (1902–1974), English novelist
- Georgette Kalil (born 2002), Ecuadorian model and beauty pageant titleholder
- Georgette Klinger (1915–2004), Czech-born American businesswoman and cosmetologist
- Georgette Leblanc (1869–1941, French operatic soprano, actress and author
- Georgette Lenoir (fl. 1922–1928), French track and field athlete, world record holder in the 800 meters and 1000 meters
- Georgette Meyer (1919–1965), also known as Dickey Chapelle, American photojournalist
- Georgette Mosbacher (born 1947), American business entrepreneur, executive, political activist and United States Ambassador to Poland
- Georgette Peterson (1863–1947), Hungarian-born composer, pianist and singer
- Georgette Seabrooke (1916–2011), American muralist, illustrator, art therapist, non-profit chief executive and educator
- Georgette Sheridan (born 1952), Canadian lawyer and politician
- Georgette Tsinguirides (born 1928), German ballet dancer, ballet mistress and choreologist
- Georgette Valle (1924–2024), American politician
- Googie Withers (1917–2011), Anglo-Indian actress

== Pseudonym ==
- Georgette Spelvin, variant on George Spelvin, a traditional American theatre pseudonym

== Fictional characters ==
- Georgette Franklin (Baxter), recurring character on the American sitcom Mary Tyler Moore, played by Georgia Engel
- Georgette Lemare, in the anime/manga Strike Witches
- Georgette, in the 1988 animated musical film Oliver & Company

== Other uses ==
- Georgette (fabric), a lightweight fabric
- Battle of the Lys, also known as Operation Georgette
