= La République française =

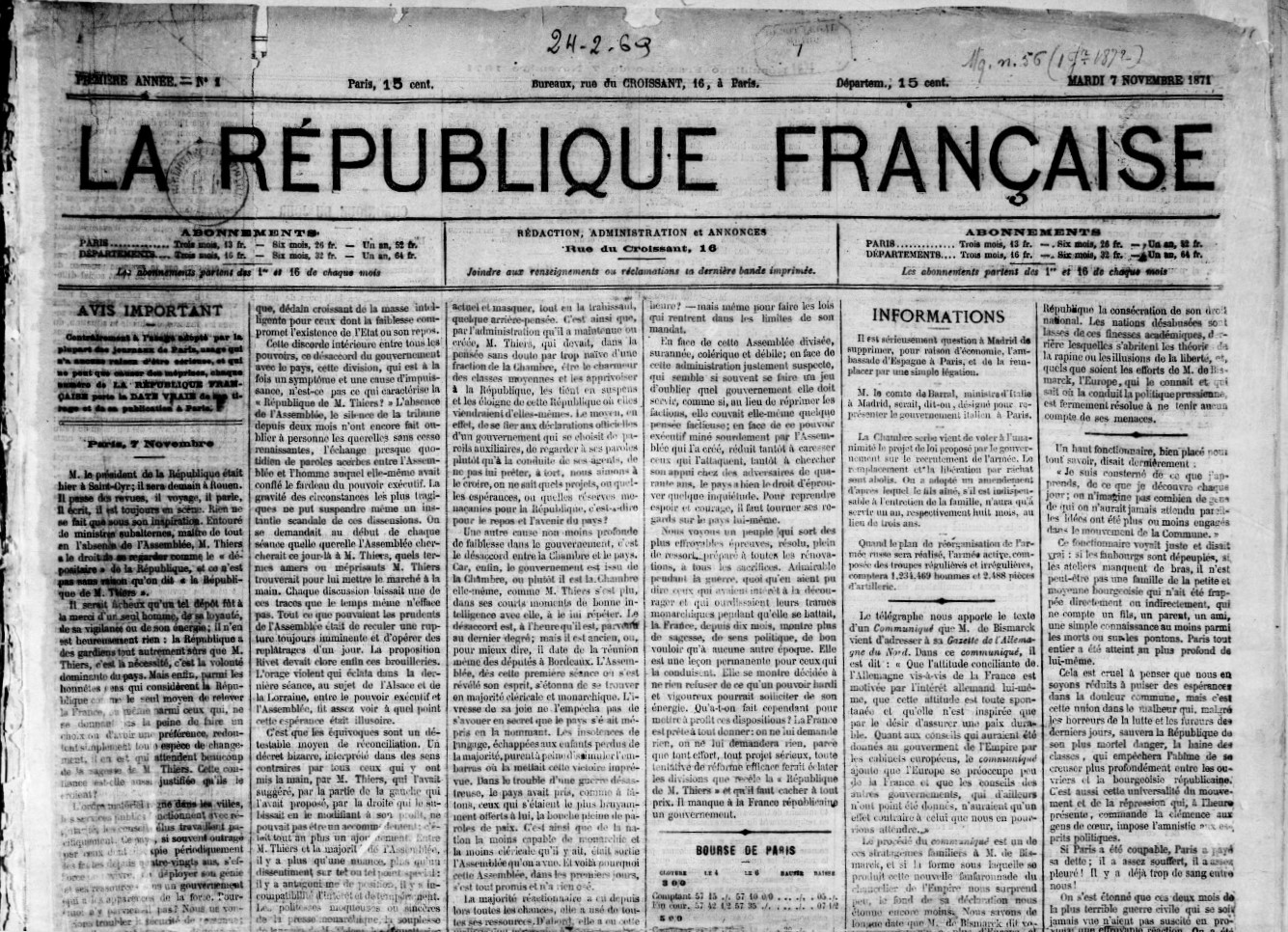
Front page of the first issue.

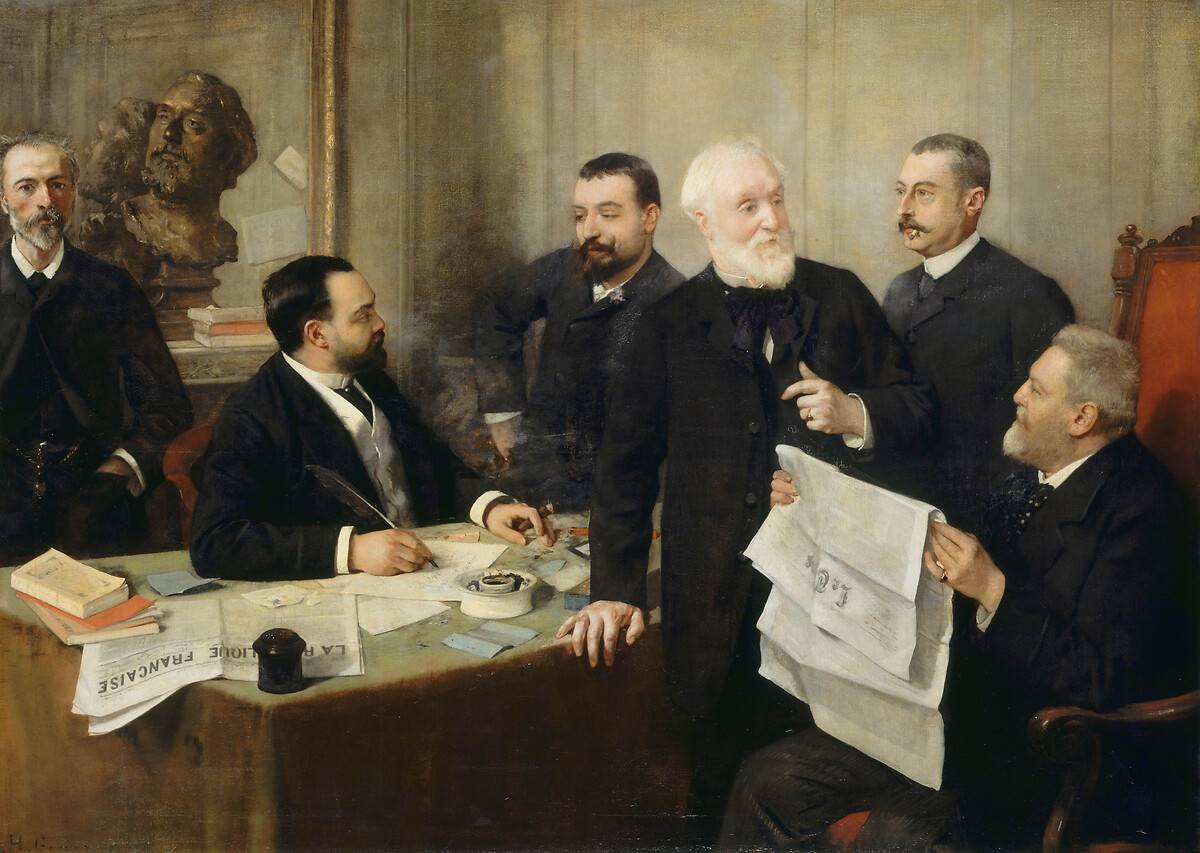
Editing La République française under the watchful eye of a bust of Gambetta. From left to right are shown Jules Roche, Joseph Reinach (sitting), Emmanuel Arène, Paul-Armand Challemel-Lacour, Pierre Waldeck-Rousseau and Eugène Spuller (sitting). - Oil on canvas by Henri Gervex, 1890, musée d'Orsay.

La République française (The French Republic) was a French daily newspaper, founded on 7 November 1871 by Léon Gambetta, with Eugène Spuller as chief editor. It continued publishing until 12 July 1924.

== History ==
Despite some will from the editorial panel to educate the less well-off, the newspaper seemed to be aimed at a more wealthy readership thanks to its high price, the austerity of its layout and the style of its language. Initially thought of as a tool for training members of the Republican Union, it quickly became successful, printing 15,000 copies a day, so much so that it helped spread the party's ideas to non-party-members.

Putting its editors in the public eye and giving them an important revenue stream, it soon allowed them to gain political power (the Union entered the Chamber of Deputies in the 1876 legislative election, with Gambetta as President of the Chamber from 1879 then President of the Council of Ministers from 1881). As the struggle for power eased, it dropped its circulation to 10,000 copies a day between 1878 and 1882, then only 4,000 after Gambetta's death in 1882.

From then until October 1893 its director was Joseph Reinach, with Paul Bluysen as chief editor The directors of the protectionist Association de l'industrie et de l'agriculture françaises (AIAF) took over control from Reinach, which then moved to the centre-right - the Association's new president Jules Méline took over the newspaper's political editorship for a time. An S.A. was set up in November 1893 to manage the newspaper, with about 480 founder-subscribers, including sixty-nine spinners and weavers in the Vosges. Chief editors in that era were Jules Domergue, also editor of the periodical La Réforme économique, linked to the AIAF (1893-1896) then Robert Charlie (1896-1900) The S.A. lasted until early in 1900.

Next Jules Roche became chief editor. During the Paris Peace Conference it, Le Rappel and all other left-leaning newspapers criticised Wilson's Fourteen Points.

== See also ==
- République du Croissant

== Bibliography ==
- Grévy, Jérôme (1998). La République des opportunistes (1870-1885). Terre d'histoire (in French). Paris: Éditions Perrin. pp. 150–170. ISBN 2-262-01344-6..
