= Georgette Bouillot =

French embroiderer and trade unionist (1892–1972)

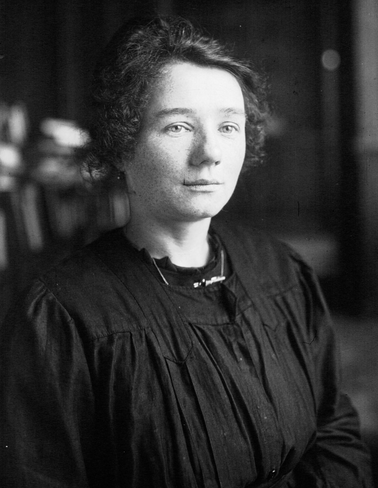
- Bouillot in 1922
- Born: 9 December 1892; 3rd arrondissement, Paris, France
- Died: 7 February 1972 (aged 79); Château-Thierry, France
- Occupations: Embroidery designer, trade unionist and women's rights activist

Georgette Bouillot (9 December 1892 – 7 February 1972) was a French embroidery designer, trade unionist and women's rights activist. She was Secretary of the Embroidery Workers Union.

== Biography ==
Bouillot was born on 9 December 1892 in Paris, the daughter of Georges Bouillot, a designer, and Louise Leprêtre, a milliner.

Bouillot was Secretary of the Embroidery Workers Union from November 1918. She led Paris embroiderers on strikes.

During his visit to France in 1919 for the Paris Peace Conference, Bouillot met the president of the United States, Woodrow Wilson, along with fellow trade unionist and feminist Jeanne Bouvier. She attended the Inter-Allied Women's Conference (also known as the Suffragist Conference of the Allied Countries and the United States), which was convened parallel to the Paris Peace Conference and to introduce women's issues to the peace process after the World War I.

In 1919, Bouillot was among the French delegation to the inaugural International Labor Conference held in Washington D.C., United States. Bouillot reported on the conference for the leftist newspaper L’Humanité.

In December 1922, Bouillot wrote to the radical-socialist newspaper La France Libre in support of equal education for women.

Bouillot died on 7 February 1972 in Château-Thierry, aged 79.
