= François Joyaux =

- Born: 1938 (age 87–88)

Academic work
- Discipline: East Asian civilization
- Institutions: INALCO, Sciences Po

François Joyaux (born in 1938) is emeritus professor of East Asian civilization at the Institut national des langues et civilisations orientales where he created the diplôme des hautes études internationales. He has also taught at the université de Paris I, the École nationale d'administration and the Instituts d'études politiques of Paris and Grenoble. He is a member of the Société Asiatique.

François Joyaux is also a collector of old garden roses and is the author of books on these flowers.

He is also interested in numismatics of East Asian countries and chairs the Asian Numismatic Society.

== Bibliography ==
=== Works on Asia ===
- 1972: Mao Tse-toung, Les Cahiers de l'Herne, n° 18 ISBN 2-2136-0414-2
- 1979: La Chine et le règlement du premier conflit d'Indochine, Genève 1954, Publications de la Sorbonne, ISBN 2-85944-013-5
- 1985: La nouvelle question d'Extrême-Orient, 1 L'ère de la guerre froide (1945–1959), Bibliothèque historique Payot, ISBN 978-2-228-13640-2
- 1988: La nouvelle question d'Extrême-Orient, 2 L'ère du conflit sino-soviétique (1959–1978), Bibliothèque historique Payot, ISBN 2-228-88089-2 - Preface by Jean-Baptiste Duroselle
- La nouvelle question d'Extrême-Orient, 3 L'ère de l'ouverture chinoise (1979–1994)
- 1991: Géopolitique de l'Extrême-Orient, Espaces et politiques, Brussels, Éditions Complexe, series "Questions au XXe", ISBN 2-87027-378-9
- 1993: Géopolitique de l'Extrême-Orient, Frontières et stratégies, Bruxelles, Éditions Complexe, series "Questions au XXe", ISBN 2-87027-504-8
- 1994: La Tentation impériale. Politique extérieure de la Chine depuis 1949, éd. Imprimerie nationale, ISBN 2-110813318
- 1993: La Politique extérieure du Japon, PUF, series "Que sais-je?" n° 2792
- 1994: La Politique extérieure de la Chine populaire, PUF, series "Que sais-je?", ISBN 2-13-045751-7
- 1998: L'Association des nations de l'Asie du Sud-Est, PUF, series "Que sais-je?" ISBN 2-13-047847-6
- 2019: Monnaies Impériales d´Annam, Éditions V. Gadoury, Monaco ISBN 978-2-906602-49-6
- 2019: Nam Phuong : La dernière impératrice du Vietnam, Perrin ISBN 978-2-262-08216-1.
- 2022: Nouvelle histoire de l'Indochine française, Perrin ISBN 978-2-262-08801-9
- 2023: Duy Tân - Un empereur dans la France libre, Perrin ISBN 978-2-262-10107-7

=== Book on roses ===
- La Rose, une passion française, 1778-1914, Éd. Complexe, 2001 ISBN 978-2-87027-871-0
- Roses anciennes, (illustrations de Josh Westrich), Éd. Cyel, ISBN 978-2-36261-000-4
- Roses et rosiéristes de l'Orléanais, Éd. Hesse, 2006 ISBN 978-2-911272-87-5,
- Les Roses de l'impératrice : la Rosomanie au temps de Joséphine, Éd. Complexe, 2005 ISBN 978-2-8048-0041-3
- Nouvelle encyclopédie des roses anciennes, Éd. Ulmer, 2005 ISBN 978-2-84138-205-7
- Deux siècles de roses : les créations Guillot, (illustrations by Vincent Motte, Jean-Pierre Guillot), Maison rustique / Flammarion, 2003 ISBN 978-2-7066-0193-4
- La Rose de France : Rosa gallica et sa descendance, (illustrations by Georges Lévêque), Imprimerie nationale, 1998 ISBN 978-2-7433-0251-1
