= La France libre (1884) =

French radical-socialist newspaper (1884–1886)

La France libre was a leftist French political daily newspaper published from 1884 to 1886.

== History ==
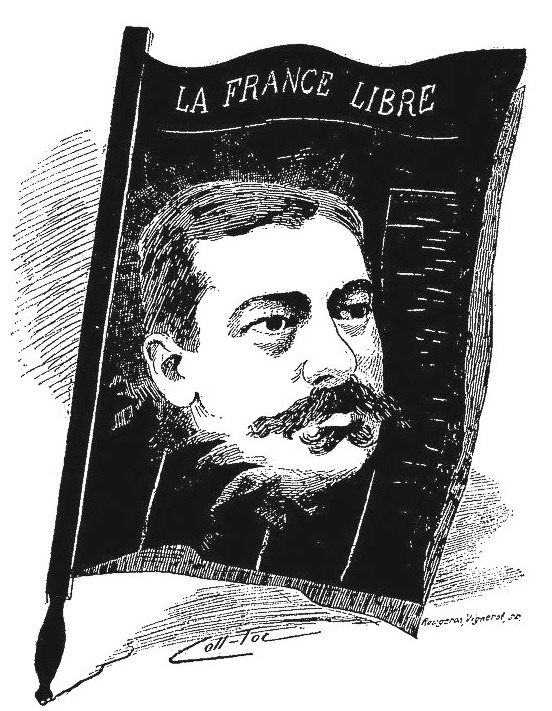
Caricature of Adolphe Maujan by Coll-Toc (1885).

After a first abortive attempt with Jean-Marguerite-Paul - known as Camille - Farcy (1840–1884) as editor in 1883, La France libre began in earnest in June 1884, when several journalists left La France, founded by Émile de Girardin and revived in 1881 by businessman Charles Lalou. Part of the radicalist press accused Lalou of having given in to pressure from judges and wanting to give guarantees to the opportunist government by interrupting Ernest Judet's virulent campaign against the policy pursued in Corsica (the Saint-Elme affair) This brutal political U-turn led to the dismissal of Judet and several other editors of La France such as Félix Granet, Charles-Marie Limousin and Raphaël Paré.

Paré and Limousin joined with Farcy and former captain Adolphe Maujan to found a new evening newspaper, reviving the title of Lalou's newspaper, with the addition of "libre". It had its headquarters at 12 rue du Croissant in Paris.

A former officer turned radical politician, Maujan was the new paper's political director. and chief editor He was strongly opposed to the opportunists (général Campenon in the Jules Ferry cabinet being responsible for his recent dismissal from the army).

The new newspaper chose "All by the people and for the people" as its motto and was open about its political programme from its very first issue on 20 June. It vowed to defend "the liberal and democratic Republic" and declared itself immune to "bargaining from secret funds" and "threatening trafficking from those in power", as well as alluding to Lalou's change of heart. The editors' determination was recognised and praised by their compatriots at the La Justice, the La Lanterne and the Radical, all of which shared its radical-socialist line.

Changes occurred in its editorship over the course of the year with Farcy's death in August then Paré and Limousin's departure, balanced out by Maurice Talmeyr, Gaston Labat and Populus 's arrival in November.

== Contributors ==
- Gustave Bichon
- Gaston Cougny
- Camille Farcy
- Gaston Labat
- Léopold Lacour
- Paul Leconte
- Anatole Le Grandais
- Charles-Marie Limousin
- Émile Max
- Raphaël Paré
- Jean-Bernard Passerieu
- Populus
- Jean Sincère
- Albert Somercour (Albert Dayrolles)
- Maurice Talmeyr
- André Vervoort

== Bibliography ==
- Émile Mermet, Annuaire de la presse française, Paris, 1885, p. LXIV-LXV.
