= Association of French Industry and Agriculture =

The Association of French Industry and Agriculture (Association de l'industrie et de l'agriculture françaises or AIAF) was a French employers' organization and pressure group created in 1878 by industrialists and parliamentary deputies during the French Third Republic.

== History ==
Its founders stated it was "for the defence of national employment", to combat liberal free trade and trade treaties and to defend a protectionist economic policy. Its status were presented and approved at an assembly in June 1878.

From the late 1880s onwards the Association became closer to notable landowners in the Société des agriculteurs de France Paul Léon Aclocque took part in the meetings of the Société des agriculteurs de France. The two associations held a joint meeting on 19 October 1892. It also linked itself to protectionist politicians like Jules Méline, who began taking part in its meetings. Together they imposed a transformation upon the customs regime in January 1892 thanks to the adoption of the 'Méline tariff', discussed by parliament since 1891. Méline became the Association's president at early in May 1893. Representatives of agriculture were merged into the Association, which changed its name to become the 'Association de l'industrie et de l'agriculture françaises'. At its general assembly in 1894 Méline also greeted the agricultural representatives:

Your presence among us is greatly satisfying. I have always thought that the best way of fighting the offensive returns of our adversaries was to meet together and closely to merge all branches of national production. The union between agriculture and industry makes our strength unshakeable. Welcome, agricultural gentlemen, industry fraternally welcomes you and you can shake the loyal hand it extends to you without a second thought..

Méline affirmed that he had only accepted the presidency on the condition that agriculture was merged into the association.

The Association's rôle diminished after 1919, when the Confédération générale de la production française was set up. It was linked to that organisation but maintained its autonomy. It tried to gain new prominence by making Pierre Lyautey its director from 1925 to 1933, who formed committees such as the Société d'économie nationale with Lucien Romier (chief editor and editorial writer for Figaro) as its president and the Comité économique international (set up in 1928). The Association specialised from then on in customs matters. René Théry, a doctor in law, and from 1925 onwards chief editor and director of L'Economiste européen succeeded P. Lyautey as delegate general.

There was a final attempt to revive the Association after 1945 via links with the Conseil national du patronat français but it was finally dissolved in 1961.

== Members and presidents ==
=== Presidents ===
- Alexandre Jullien, ironmaster, former deputy in parliament
- Paul Léon Aclocque, industrialist, former deputy for Ariège, 1888 to his death in 1893
- Jules Méline, 1893 to 1896 and 1898 to 1912
- Charles Sébline, landowner, senator for Aisne, from 1896 to 1898, replacing Méline while the latter was Minister of Agriculture
- Eugène Touron, industrialist, senator for Aisne and president of the Chambre de commerce de Saint-Quentin, 1912 until his death in December 1924
- Henry Le Mire, industrialist, deputy for Eure, 1925 to 1934
- Émile Taudière, industrialist, deputy for Les Deux-Sèvres, October 1934 à 1945
- René Théry

== Bibliography (in French) ==
- Jean Garrigues, Les patrons et la politique: 150 ans de liaisons dangereuses, 2011
- Denis Woronoff, Histoire de l'industrie en France, du XVIe siècle à nos jours, Seuil, 1994
- Gabrielle Cadier-Rey, 'Les chambres de commerce dans le débat douanier à la fin du XIXe siècle', in Histoire, économie et société, 1997 , vol. 16

== External links (in French) ==
- Archives de l'Association
- Meeting de protestation du 19 octobre 1892
- Assemblées générales de l'Association dans BNF/Gallica
- Collection du Bulletin mensuel de la Société d'économie politique nationale
