= Edmond Robert =

Edmond Robert (13 January 1849 - 20 March 1907) was a French politician. He was a prefect of four departments in succession under the French Third Republic and from 1881 to 1885 deputy for Oise.

== Life ==
Born in Metz, he studied law and became a lawyer in Paris. He contributed to the L'union des jeunes newspaper before becoming a co-founder of La basoche in 1869. and publishing a book on the history of domesticity in 1875. He was given the Legion of Honour in 1880.

He was made sub-prefect of Nogent-sur-Seine in 1876, then of Compiègne in 1877, before becoming prefect of the Ardèche department in 1879. On 21 August 1881 he was elected deputy for Oise, sitting with the Republican Left. He lost the 1885 election and returned to being a prefect, this time of the Vendée (1887–1890), Isère (1890–1893), and Côtes-du-Nord (1902–1906) departments.

He retired from public life in 1906 and died in Paris the following year - he is buried in the 41st division of the Père-Lachaise Cemetery.

== Works ==
- Les Domestiques, étude de mœurs et d'histoire, Paris : G. Baillière, 1875.

== Sources ==
- "Edmond Robert", in Adolphe Robert and Gaston Cougny, Dictionnaire des parlementaires français (1789–1891), Bourloton, Paris, 1889 Edition details Wikisource

== External links (in French) ==
- Base Léonore entry
- Portrait of Edmone Robert on the Archives du Calvados site
