= Adolphe Robert =

French historian and biographer (1833–1899)

Adolphe Robert (17 January 1833, Melun – 23 December 1899, Paris) was a 19th-century French historian and biographer.

With Gaston Cougny, he wrote the Dictionnaire des parlementaires français (1789-1889) (Paris, Edgar Bourloton, 1889–1891, 5 vol.) and collaborated to the Dictionnaire historique et biographique de la Révolution et de l'Empire by Jean-François Robinet (Paris, Librairie historique de la Révolution et de l'Empire, 1898, 2 vol.).
