= Jean Maitron =

French historian (1910–1987)

- Born: 17 December 1910; Sardy-lès-Épiry, Nièvre, France
- Died: 16 November 1987 (aged 76); Créteil, France
- Occupation: Historian
- Known for: Le Maitron

Jean Maitron (1910–1987) was a French historian specialist of the labour movement.

Maitron is best known for his Dictionnaire biographique du mouvement ouvrier français (DBMOF or, more currently, Le Maitron), a comprehensive biographical dictionary of figures from the French workers' movement which was continued after his death, as well as a study of anarchism, History of anarchism in France (first ed. 1951), which has become a classic. Starting with the 1789 French Revolution, it includes 103,000 entries gathered by 455 different authors working under Maitron's direction. The Maitron has now extended itself with international versions, treating Austria (1971), United Kingdom (1979 and 1986), Japan (1979), Germany (1990), China (1985), Morocco (1998), United States from 1848 to 1922 (2002), a transnational one about the Komintern (2001) and the most recently published about Algeria (2006), almost all published at the Éditions de l'Atelier.

Maitron wrote in 1950 a study on the anarchism movement in France and wrote a complementary study of Paul Delesalle, an anarcho-syndicalist. He retired in 1976 and was nominated as chevalier de la Légion d'honneur in 1982 and a chevalier des Arts et Lettres in 1985.

== Bibliography ==
- Histoire du mouvement anarchiste en France (1800–1914), SUDEL, Paris, 1951, 744 p., out of print. Second edition with preface from G. Bourgin, 1955, out of print. Reprinted in two volumes by François Maspero, Paris, 1975, reprinted Gallimard.
- Le Syndicalisme révolutionnaire, Paul Delesalle. Preface d'É. Dolléans, Éditions ouvrières, 1952, 176 p. Reprinted by A. Fayard in 1985.
- De la Bastille au Mont Valérien. Dix promenades à travers Paris révolutionnaire, Éditions ouvrières, 1956, 286 p. Out of print.
- Ravachol et les anarchistes, collection Archives, 1964, 216 p. Out of print.
- Publication de textes : H. Messager, Lettres de déportation, 1871-1876, Paris, Le Sycomore, 380 p., 1979.
- Les Archives de Pierre Monatte (in collaboration with Colette Chambelland), preface from E. Labrousse, Maspero, 1968, 462 p. -- Dictionnaire biographique du mouvement ouvrier, Editions ouvrières then Editions de l'Atelier.
- The series of 61 volumes of the French and international Le Maitron (34 published during his life, 27 published after his death under the direction of Claude Pennetier), Editions de l'Atelier.

== See also ==
- Anarchism in France
- Le Mouvement social
