= Claude Pennetier =

French historian (born 1947)

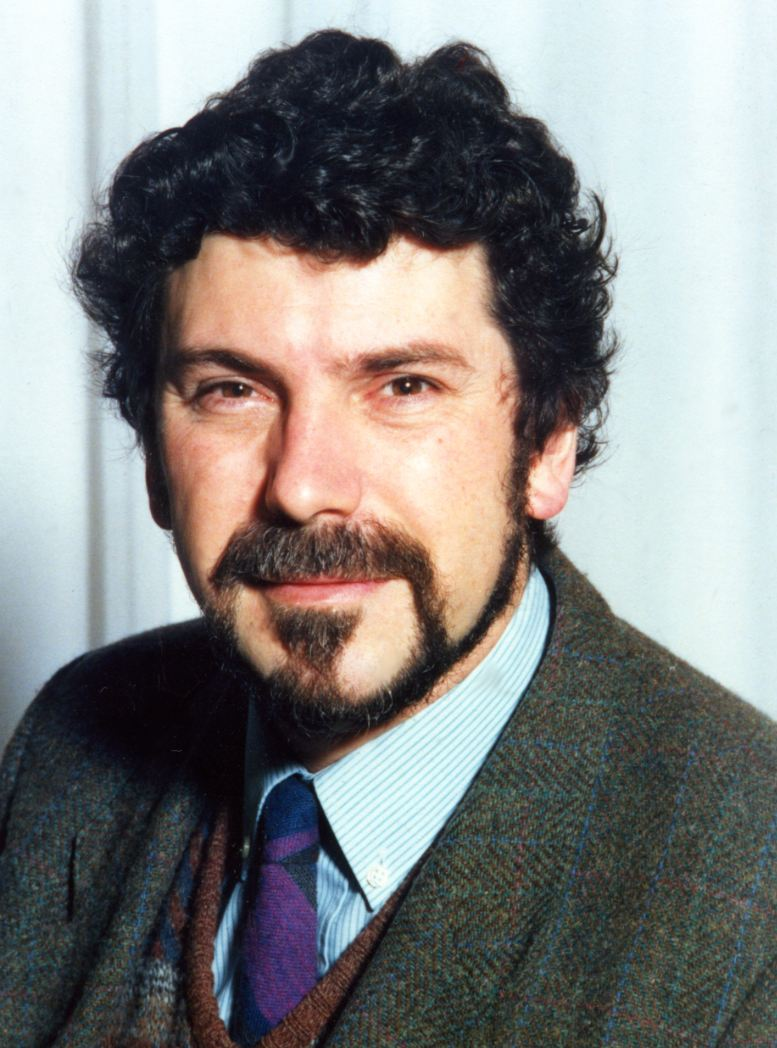
- Pennetier in 2014
- Born: 17 November 1947 (age 78)
- Occupation: Researcher
- Father: Marcel Pennetier

Academic background
- Education: History in Sorbonne University
- Thesis: Le Socialisme dans les départements ruraux français: l'exemple du Cher, 1850-1921 (1977)

Claude Pennetier (born 17 November 1947) is a French historian.

A researcher at the CNRS, he specialises in the social history of activism.

Pennetier is a member of the fondation Copernic and the Ligue des droits de l'Homme. He was publicly opposed to the 2005 French law on colonialism which defended "the positive role" of French colonialism.

== Early life and education ==
He was a son of Marcel Pennetier (1914-1993), a school teacher and philosophy licentiate who re-founded the teaching union 'École émancipée' after the liberation of France in 1944. Claude was initially a militant in the MRAP then in the action committees in 1968 whilst he was studying history at the Sorbonne. He gained his doctorate in 1977.

== Career and research ==
He spent his whole career as a researcher in the CRNS.

At the start of the 1980s, he became associated with Jean Maitron in heading the Dictionnaire biographique du mouvement ouvrier français, work he undertook alone after the creator's death in 1987. He edited the "La Part des Hommes" collection published by the Éditions de l'Atelier, which "proposed to let the reader discover itineraries of women and men, actors in the social movement, from the French Revolution to our own days" He was responsible for the "Lien militant" pole and the "Prosopographie des militants" programme at the Centre d’histoire sociale du XXe siècle in the université Paris I.

In 2000, he worked with the political scientist Bernard Pudal on the "policy of framing" put in place at the PCF in the 1930s.

He also worked on rural socialism, on the 'ceinture rouge' and on the social biography of activism, also with Bernard Pudal.

With Jean-Pierre Besse, he published Juin 40, la négociation secrète and prepared a biographical dictionary of those executed during the occupation, which he continued after Besse's death with Thomas Pouty, on the online Le Maitron.

The Dictionnaire biographique du mouvement ouvrier français, which became the Dictionnaire biographique, mouvement ouvrier, mouvement social, was published between 2006 and 2016 in 71 volumes, including 53 alphabetical French volumes. The 1940-1968 period accounted for 12 volumes. From volume 9 onwards, Pennetier and Paul Boulland shared editorship. Among thematic dictionaries he took part in the book Les anarchistes. Dictionnaire biographique du mouvement libertaire francophone (2014) and the Dictionnaire biographique des militants des industries électriques et gazières de la Libération aux années (edited by Paul Boulland).

== Publications ==
- L’histoire collective de Jean Maitron, La République des idées, 13 octobre 2017 (online version http://www.laviedesidees.fr/L-histoire-collective-de-Jean-Maitron.html)
- Le souffle d'Octobre 1917, Pourquoi ont-ils cru au communisme ?, avec Bernard Pudal, Editions de l'Atelier, février 2017.
- Les Fusillés (1940-1944) : dictionnaire biographique des fusillés et exécutés par condamnation et comme otages et guillotinés en France pendant l'Occupation, coedited with Jean-Pierre Besse, Thomas Pouty et Delphine Leneveu, Éditions de l'Atelier, 2015, 1952 p.
- Le Sujet communiste, with Bernard Pudal, Presses universitaires de Rennes, 2014
- Le Mouvement ouvrier au miroir de la biographie. Matériaux pour l’histoire de notre temps, No. 104-105, 2012, with Bruno Groppo and Bernard Pudal
- Juin 40, la négociation secrète, with Jean-Pierre Besse, Paris, Éditions de l'Atelier, 2006, 208 p.
- André Marty, l’homme, l’affaire, l’archive, with Paul Boulland and Rossana Vaccaro, Paris, Codos édition, 2005, 189 p.
- Autobiographies, autocritiques, aveux dans le monde communiste, with Bernard Pudal (sd), Paris, « Socio-histoire », Belin, 2002, 368 p.
- Marges et replis, frontières, cas limites dans la gauche française : l’apport des itinéraires militants, (sd), CHS, 2002, 78 p.
- Le Siècle des communismes, coedited with Michel Dreyfus, Bruno Groppo, Claudio Ingerflom, Roland Lew, Bernard Pudal et Serge Wolikow, Paris, Éditions de l'Atelier, 2000, 542 p. (republished as a pocket edition : Points Seuil, 2004, 790 p.).
- La Part des militants, with Michel Dreyfus and Nathalie Viet-Depaule, Paris, Éditions de l'Atelier, 1996.
- Itinéraires orlysiens. Les militants de l’entre-deux-guerres, with Nathalie Viet-Depaule, Paris, Éditions de l'Atelier, 1994, 139 p.
- L’Internationale des dictionnaires. Matériaux pour l’histoire de notre temps, no. 34, 1994, with Michel Dreyfus and Nathalie Viet-Depaule
- Le Socialisme dans le Cher, 1851-1921, La Charité/Paris, Éditions Delayance/Maison des sciences de l'homme, 1982, 306 p.
