= Dictionnaire biographique du mouvement ouvrier français =

Biographical dictionaries of the French labor movement

- Pt. 4 1914-1939
- Author: Jean Maitron
- Subject: French labor movement
- Publisher: Editions de l'Atelier
- Publication date: 1967–1997

Dictionnaire biographique du mouvement ouvrier français (DBMOF, "Biographical Dictionary of the French Workers' Movement") is a 44-volume set of biographical dictionaries of the French labor movement compiled by historian Jean Maitron and his successor Claude Pennetier between 1967 and 1997.

== Bibliography ==
- B., A. (1987). "Review of Dictionnaire biographique du mouvement ouvrier (1914-1939), tomes 27 et 28". La Revue administrative. 40 (237): 298. ISSN 0035-0672. JSTOR 40781399.
- Bouzely, Jean-Claude (1984). "Review of Dictionnaire biographique du mouvement ouvrier français". La Revue administrative. 37 (218): 214–215. ISSN 0035-0672. JSTOR 40781011.
- Cooke, James J. (1974). "Review of Dictionnaire Biographique du mouvement ouvrier français". The French Review. 47 (4): 852–853. ISSN 0016-111X. JSTOR 388492.
- Domenach, J.-M. (1965). "Review of Dictionnaire biographique du mouvement ouvrier français". Esprit. 334 (1): 286–287. ISSN 0014-0759. JSTOR 24259490.
- Dreyfus, Michel (1989). "Review of Dictionnaire biographique du mouvement ouvrier français". Revue d'histoire moderne et contemporaine (1954-). 36 (2): 353–356. ISSN 0048-8003. JSTOR 20529598.
- Groppo, Bruno (2011). "Les dictionnaires biographiques du mouvement ouvrier : analyse comparée d'un genre scientifique". Matériaux pour l'histoire de notre temps (in French). 104–105 (4): 6–15. doi:10.3917/mate.104.0006. ISSN 0769-3206.
- Lhomme, Jean (1968). "Review of Dictionnaire biographique du mouvement ouvrier français". Revue économique. 19 (2): 369. doi:10.2307/3499219. ISSN 0035-2764. JSTOR 3499219.
- Lhomme, Jean (1968). "Review of Dictionnaire biographique du mouvement ouvrier français". Revue économique. 19 (6): 1086. doi:10.2307/3499219. ISSN 0035-2764. JSTOR 4626684.
- Ceamanos Llorens, Roberto (2004). "De la biografía individual a la prosopografía: el Dictionnaire Biographique du Mouvement Ouvrier Français". Ayer (56): 245–267. ISSN 1134-2277. JSTOR 41325285.
- Lorwin, Val R. (1971). "Review of Dictionnaire biographique du mouvement ouvrier français. (Deuxième Partie: 1864-1871. La Première Internationale et la Commune.)". The French Review. 44 (5): 943–945. ISSN 0016-111X. JSTOR 386343.
- Pennetier, Claude (1994). "Le dictionnaire biographique du mouvement ouvrier français". Genèses. Sciences sociales et histoire (in French). 14 (1): 124–135. doi:10.3406/genes.1994.1219.
- Perrot, Michelle (1965). "Review of Dictionnaire biographique du mouvement ouvrier français Première partie: '1789-1864. De la Révolution française à la fondation de la Ire Internationale'. Tome 1: A à Cz". Le Mouvement Social (50): 129–130. doi:10.2307/3777345. ISSN 0027-2671. JSTOR 3777345.
- Racine, Nicole (1972). "Review of Dictionnaire biographique du mouvement ouvrier français, I re partie : 1789-1864. De la Révolution française à la fondation de la Première Internationale. II e partie : 1864-1871. La Première Internationale et la Commune". Revue française de science politique. 22 (4): 912–914. ISSN 0035-2950. JSTOR 43117858.
- Rioux, Jean-Pierre (1984). "Review of Dictionnaire biographique du mouvement ouvrier français". Vingtième Siècle. Revue d'histoire (1): 133. doi:10.2307/3770147. ISSN 0294-1759. JSTOR 3770147.
- Sorlin, Pierre (June 21, 1967). "' Le dictionnaire biographique du mouvement ouvrier français ', de Jean Maitron". Le Monde (in French).
- Thuillier, Guy (1967). "Review of Dictionnaire biographique du mouvement ouvrier français, 4 volumes". La Revue administrative. 20 (119): 641. ISSN 0035-0672. JSTOR 40780403.
- Thuillier, Guy (1969). "Review of Dictionnaire biographique du mouvement ouvrier, tome 6". La Revue administrative. 22 (130): 541. ISSN 0035-0672. JSTOR 40764664.
- Thuillier, Guy (1970). "Review of Dictionnaire biographique du mouvement ouvrier français, tome VII". La Revue administrative. 23 (136): 485. ISSN 0035-0672. JSTOR 40764890.
- Thuillier, Guy (1971). "Review of Dictionnaire biographique du mouvement ouvrier français, tome VIII". La Revue administrative. 24 (139): 115. ISSN 0035-0672. JSTOR 40766056.
- Thuillier, Guy (1974). "Review of Dictionnaire biographique du mouvement ouvrier, tomes 10 et 11". La Revue administrative. 27 (157): 95. ISSN 0035-0672. JSTOR 40766992.
- Thuillier, Guy (1976). "Review of Dictionnaire biographique du mouvement ouvrier français, tome XIII". La Revue administrative. 29 (169): 103. ISSN 0035-0672. JSTOR 40766726.
- Thuillier, Guy; A., R. (1987). "Review of Dictionnaire biographique du mouvement ouvrier français, 1914-1939, tome 29 (lettres GA-GIL)". La Revue administrative. 40 (240): 607. ISSN 0035-0672. JSTOR 40781920.
- Wall, Irwin M. (1975). "Review of Dictionnaire biographique du mouvement ouvrier français. Troisième partie: de la Commune à la Grande Guerre, tome XI (Bou à Del)". The French Review. 49 (2): 311. ISSN 0016-111X. JSTOR 388747.
- Winock, Michel (1973). "Review of Dictionnaire biographique du mouvement ouvrier français Trosième partie : 1871-1914, tome 10, « A à Bou »; Dictionnaire biographique du mouvement ouvrier international, l'Autriche". Esprit. 424 (5): 1239–1240. ISSN 0014-0759. JSTOR 24262755.
- Winock, Michel (1975). "Review of Dictionnaire biographique du mouvement ouvrier français, 1871-1914, t. XI". Esprit. 443 (2): 312. ISSN 0014-0759. JSTOR 24264253.
- Zwirn, Jacques (1964). "Review of Dictionnaire biographique du mouvement ouvrier français, 1 re partie: 1789-1864. De la Révolution française à la fondation de la première Internationale. T. I". Revue française de science politique. 14 (6): 1195–1197. ISSN 0035-2950. JSTOR 43114843.
