= Le Radical =

- Cover of Le Radical
- Founder: F. L. Morel
- Founded: 1898
- Language: French language
- Headquarters: Port Louis
- Circulation: 2,000 (early 1900s)

Le Radical ('The Radical') was a French language conservative daily newspaper published from Port Louis, Mauritius. The newspaper was founded in 1898 by F. L. Morel, who served as its editor-in-chief during its initial period. Le Radical was mainly dedicated to politics. It contained some articles in English. In 1909 a second daily edition was launched. During this period it had a circulation of around 2,000, out of which a large share were sold at the Port Louis central train station.

In 1937, its editor-in-chief was P-H. Galéa.
