= Éditions de l'Atelier =

- Parent company: La Découverte
- Status: Small press
- Predecessor: Éditions Ouvrières (named 1955, renamed 1993)
- Founded: 1929
- Founders: Jeunesse Ouvrière Chrétienne
- Country of origin: France
- Headquarters location: Ivry-sur-Seine
- Key people: Jean-Paul Bouchet (president, board of directors), Jean-Paul Guillot (director)
- Nonfiction topics: social sciences, politics, social justice
- Owner: Editis
- Official website: https://editionsatelier.com/boutique/

The Éditions de l'Atelier is a French publishing house. It was founded library for the working class in Paris in 1929 by the Young Christian Workers. The next year, it began to publish books, and from 1939 it published under the name Éditions Jeunesse Ouvrière Chrétienne. Its name was shortened to Éditions Ouvrières in 1955.

The publishing house changed its name to Éditions de l'Atelier in 1993.

In 1996, it merged with Syros (French publishing house) and La Découverte. La Découverte, part of the Editis publishing conglomerate, acquired Éditions de l'Atelier and Syros as imprints.
