= Eugen Relgis =

20th-century Romanian academic (1895 - 1987)

- Photograph of Eugen Relgis
- Born: Eisig D. Sigler (Siegler, Siegler Watchel); 22 March 1895; Iași or Piatra Neamț, Romania
- Died: 24 May 1987 (aged 92); Montevideo, Uruguay
- Other names: Eugenio Relgis, Eugène Relgis, Eugene Relgis

Academic background
- Influences: Henri Bergson, Manuel Devaldès, Mohandas Karamchand Gandhi, Remy de Gourmont, Jean-Marie Guyau, Georg Friedrich Nicolai, José Enrique Rodó, Romain Rolland, Moses Schwarzfeld, Rabindranath Tagore

Academic work
- Era: 20th century
- School or tradition: Humanitarianist, Anarchist, Pacifist, Socialist, Neo-Malthusian
- Main interests: self-help, Jewish studies, Latin American studies, eugenics, medical sociology, sexology
- Notable works: Umanitarism și eugenism (1934–1935); Esseuri despre iudaism (1936); Eros în al treilea Reich (1946); Las aberraciones sexuales en la Alemania nazi (1950); Perspectivas culturales en Sudamérica (1958); Historia sexual de la Humanidad (1961)
- Influenced: Gaspare Mancuso, Llorenç Vidal Vidal

Eugen D. Relgis (backward reading of Eisig D. Sigler; first name also Eugenio, Eugène or Eugene, last name also Siegler or Siegler Watchel; 22 March 1895 – 24 May 1987) was a Romanian writer, pacifist philosopher and anarchist militant, known as a theorist of humanitarianism. His internationalist dogma, with distinct echoes from Judaism and Jewish ethics, was first shaped during World War I, when Relgis was a conscientious objector. Infused with anarcho-pacifism and socialism, it provided Relgis with an international profile, and earned him the support of pacifists such as Romain Rolland, Stefan Zweig and Albert Einstein. Another, more controversial, aspect of Relgis' philosophy was his support for eugenics, which centered on the compulsory sterilization of "degenerates". The latter proposal was voiced by several of Relgis' essays and sociological tracts.

After an early debut with Romania's Symbolist movement, Relgis promoted modernist literature and the poetry of Tudor Arghezi, signing his name to a succession of literary and political magazines. His work in fiction and poetry alternates the extremes of Expressionism and didactic art, giving artistic representation to his activism, his pacifist vision, or his struggle with a hearing impairment. He was a member of several modernist circles, formed around Romanian magazines such as Sburătorul, Contimporanul or Șantier, but also close to the more mainstream journal Viața Românească. His political and literary choices made Relgis an enemy of both fascism and communism: persecuted during World War II, he eventually took refuge in Uruguay. From 1947 to the moment of his death, Relgis earned the respect of South American circles as an anarchist commentator and proponent of solutions to world peace, as well as a promoter of Latin American culture.

== Biography ==
=== Early life and literary debut ===
The future Eugen Relgis was a native of Moldavia region, belonging to the local Jewish community. His father, David Sigler, professed Judaism, and descended from tanners settled in Neamț County. Eisig had two sisters, Adelina Derevici and Eugenia Soru, both of whom had careers in biochemistry. Born in either Iași or Piatra Neamț, Eisig was educated in Piatra Neamț, where he became friends with the family of novelist and Zionist leader A. L. Zissu. It was in Zissu's circle that Relgis probably first met his mentor, the Romanian modernist author Tudor Arghezi; at the time, Arghezi was married to Constanța Zissu, mother of his photographer son Eli Lotar. The young writer later noted that he and Zissu were both touched by the wild landscape of the Ceahlău Massif and Piatra's shtetl atmosphere. In another one of his texts, Relgis recalled having been influenced in childhood by selective readings from the Romanian Jewish scholar Moses Schwarzfeld and his Anuarul pentru Israeliți journal (he told that, during later years, he had collected the entire Anuarul collection).

Taking his first steps in literary life, Eisig Sigler adopted his new name through forms of wordplay which enjoyed some popularity among pseudonymous Jewish writers (the case of Paul Celan, born Ancel). He was from early on a promoter of Symbolist and modernist literature, a cause into which he blended his left-wing perspective and calls for Jewish emancipation. Writing in 2007, literary historian Paul Cernat suggested that Relgis, like fellow humanitarian and Jewish intellectual Isac Ludo, had a "not at all negligible" part to play in the early diffusion of Romanian modernism. Relgis' main contribution in the 1910s was the Symbolist tribune Fronda ("The Fronde"), the three consecutive issues of which he edited, in Iași, between April and June 1912.

Like Ludo's review Absolutio (which saw print two years later), Fronda stood for the radical branch of the Romanian Symbolist movement in Iași, in contrast to both the left-leaning but traditionalist magazine Viața Românească and the more conventional Symbolism of Versuri și Proză journal. Its editorial board, Relgis included, went anonymous, but their names were known to other periodicals of the day and to later researchers. According to Cernat, Relgis was "the most significant Frondiste", seconded by two future figures in Romanian Jewish journalism: Albert Schreiber and Carol Steinberg. Like Ludo and poet Benjamin Fondane, the Fronda group represented those Romanian Jewish aficionados in Iași who followed the Symbolist-modernist school of Arghezi, and who promoted Arghezi's poetry in northern Romania: Fronda's writers were noted for saluting Viața Românească when it too began hosting poems by Arghezi.

Fronda put out three issues in all, after which time Relgis became an occasional contributor to more circulated periodicals, among them Rampa (founded by Arghezi and the socialist agitator N. D. Cocea) and Vieața Nouă (led by Symbolist critic Ovid Densusianu). In 1913, he collected his loose philosophical essays, or "fantasies", in the volume Triumful neființei ("The Triumph of Non-Being"). He published his first two books of poems during World War I, but before the end of Romania's neutrality period. The first one was a collection of sonnets, Sonetele nebuniei ("Sonnets of Madness"), printed at Iași in 1914; the second was published in the capital, Bucharest, as Nebunia ("Madness"). Some of these poems were illustrated with drawings in Relgis' own hand.

=== From Umanitatea to Mântuirea ===
After training in architecture, Relgis was enrolled at the University of Bucharest, where he took courses in Philosophy. During the period, he first left Romania on a trip to the Ottoman Empire and Kingdom of Greece. He interrupted his studies shortly after Romania entered the war, in the second half of 1916. Back in Iași after the Central Powers stormed into southern Romania, he was reportedly drafted into the Romanian Land Forces, but refused to take up arms as a conscientious objector; briefly imprisoned as a result, he was in the end discharged for his deafness.

Resuming his publishing activity upon the end of war, Eugen Relgis began publicizing his humanitarianist and pacifist agenda. In summer 1918, Relgis became one of the contributors to the Iași-based review Umanitatea ("The Humanity" or "The Human Race"). Historian Lucian Boia, who notes that Umanitatea was published when Romania's temporary defeat seemed to announce sweeping political reforms, believes that the magazine mainly reflected the "nebulous" agenda of a senior editor, the Bessarabian journalist Alexis Nour. In addition to Relgis and Nour, Umanitatea enlisted contributions from Ludo and Avram Steuerman-Rodion. The short-lived magazine, Boia writes, supported land reform, labor rights and, unusually in the context of "pronounced Romanian antisemitism", Jewish emancipation. On his own, Relgis published a magazine of the same title, issued during 1920. According to one account, Umanitatea was closed down by Romania's military censorship, which kept a check on radical publications. In 1921, an unsigned chronicle in the Cluj-based Gândirea journal recognized in Relgis "the kind and enthusiastic young man who was propagating [...] the religion of man through Umanitatea magazine".

Relgis resumed his literary activity early in the interwar period. He authored his ideological essay Literatura războiului și era nouă (Bucharest, 1919); another such piece, Umanitarism sau Internaționala intelectualilor ("Humanitarianism or the Intellectuals' Internationale"), taken up by Viața Românească in 1922. Viața Românească also published Relgis' abridged translation of The Biology of War, a pacifist treatise by German physician Georg Friedrich Nicolai. 1922 witnessed the birth of Relgis' manifesto Principiile umanitariste ("Humanitarianist Principles"), which offered Relgis' own conclusions on world peace, while reaffirming the need to create an international pacifist forum of intellectuals. It carried a preface by Nicolai.

Relgis also set up the First Humanitarianist Group of Romania, as well as a leftist library, Biblioteca Cercului Libertatea ("Freedom Circle Library"). Joined in such efforts by the veteran anarchists Han Ryner and Panait Mușoiu, Relgis also circulated an Apel către toți intelectualii liberi și muncitorii luminați ("Appeal to All the Free Intellectuals and the Enlightened Workers"). Before 1932, the Humanitarianist Group created some 23 regional branches in Greater Romania. Beginning 1925, Relgis also represented Romanian pacifists within the War Resisters' International.

In the meantime, he continued to publish sporadic poems, such as Ascetism ("Asceticism"), featured in Gândirea. The year 1923 witnessed the beginnings of a friendship between Relgis and the aspiring pacifist author George Mihail Zamfirescu. Relgis prefaced Zamfirescu's book Flamura albă ("The White Flag"), and contributed to Zamfirescu's magazine Icoane Maramureșene ("Maramureș Icons"). A prose volume, Peregrinări ("Wanderings"), saw print with Editura Socec the same year. Relgis also published, in 1924, the 3 volumes of his main novel Petru Arbore (a Bildungsroman named after its main protagonist). Two new volumes of his topical essays saw print in later years: the first one, published by the printing offices of fellow journalist Barbu Brănișteanu, was Umanitarism și socialism ("Humanitarianism and Socialism", 1925); the second, printed in 1926, was titled Umanitarismul biblic ("Humanitarianism in the Bible"). His press activity included contributions to Zionist papers: a writer for Știri din Lumea Evreiască, he was also briefly on the staff of Zissu's Mântuirea.

=== Sburătorul and Umanitarismul ===
Also during the early 1920s, Eugen Relgis came into contact with the Bucharest-based Sburătorul circle, which stood for modernist literature and aesthetic relativism. The eponymous magazine published samples of his lyrical poetry. With his humanitarian literature, Relgis was a singular figure among the many Sburătorul factions, as later noted by literary historian Ovid Crohmălniceanu in discussing the studied eclecticism of Sburătorul doyen Eugen Lovinescu. Another Romanian researcher, Henri Zalis, notes that Relgis was one of the many Jewish intellectuals whom Lovinescu cultivated in reaction to the tradition of ethno-nationalist discrimination. However, according to critic Eugen Simion, Lovinescu also greatly exaggerated Relgis' literary worth.

Relgis' contribution to Romanian literature was renewed in 1926, when he published Melodiile tăcerii ("Melodies of Silence") and the collection Poezii ("Poems"), followed in 1927 by Glasuri în surdină ("Muted Voices"). The latter novel, later republished with a foreword by Austrian author Stefan Zweig, chronicled Relgis' own difficulties with his post-lingual deafness.

At that stage in his career, Eugen Relgis was also a contributor to the Bucharest left-wing dailies Adevărul and Dimineața, part of a new generation of radical or pacifist authors cultivated by the newspaper (alongside Zamfirescu, Ion Marin Sadoveanu and various others). His pieces for Adevărul include insights into medical sociology, such as the September 1922 Înapoi, la biologie! ("Back to Biology!"). The Adevărul publishing house issued his 1925 translation of Knut Hamsun's story Slaves of Love. At around the same time, the Căminul Library, publishers of popular education books, issued Relgis' translation from Thus Spoke Zarathustra, the classic novel of German philosopher Friedrich Nietzsche. It endured as one of two Romanian-language versions of Nietzsche's main works to be published before the 1970s, together with George B. Rateș's The Antichrist. Relgis' work as a translator also included versions of writings by Zweig, Émile Armand, Selma Lagerlöf, Emil Ludwig and Jakob Wassermann.

After editing the short-lived gazette Cugetul Liber ("Freethought"), Eugen Relgis put out the political and cultural review Umanitarismul ("Humanitarianism"). It enlisted contributions from the Romanian writers Ion Barbu, Alexandru Al. Philippide and Ion Vinea, and was positively reviewed by other cultural figures (Tudor Arghezi, Enric Furtună, Meyer Abraham Halevy, Perpessicius). He published his work in a variety of periodicals, from Vinea's modernist mouthpiece Contimporanul, Ludo's Adam review and the Zionist Cuvântul Nostru to the Romanian traditionalist journal Cuget Clar. With his publishing house Editura Umanitatea, Relgis also contributed a 1929 book of interviews, based on texts previously featured in Umanitarismul: Anchetă asupra internaționalei pacifiste ("An Inquiry about the Pacifist International"). The same year, Relgis lectured at the Zionist Avodah circle about the opportunities of Jewish return to the Land of Israel.

=== Travels abroad and Șantier affiliation ===
The Romanian writer traveled extensively to promote his ideas of social change. By 1928, he was in regular correspondence with French writer and human rights activist Romain Rolland, who answered in writing to Relgis' various inquiries. He was a delegate to pacifist reunions in Hoddesdon, England and Sonntagberg, Austria (1928). Relgis also exchanged letters with various other prestigious left-wing intellectuals: Zweig, Upton Sinclair, Henri Barbusse, Max Nettlau etc. His various inquiries also enlisted positive replies from other international supporters of pacifism: physicist Albert Einstein, biologist Auguste Forel, writer Heinrich Mann and anarchist militant Paul Reclus. He became a contributor to Sébastien Faure's Anarchist Encyclopedia, with the "Humanitarianism" entry. In 1929, Delpeuch company published his French-language essay L'Internationale pacifiste ("The Pacifist International"), reissued the same year in Valencia, Spain, as La Internacional Pacifista.

Around 1930, Relgis was in Paris, where he met with Han Ryner, and in Berlin, where he conversed with his mentor Nicolai. In its new translated editions, Apel către... was signed by a number of leading pacifist intellectuals of various persuasions, among them Zweig, Sinclair, Barbusse, Campio Carpio, Manuel Devaldès, Philéas Lebesgue, Rabindranath Tagore. While in France, where his work was notably popularized by L'En-Dehors magazine and Gérard de Lacaze-Duthiers's Bibliothèque de l'Artistocratie book collection, he was for a while close to Barbusse's Clarté circle, but left it after discovering its communist militancy and Soviet connections. His Intellectuals' Internationale therefore took distance from both the Comintern and the International Working Union of Socialist Parties.

In 1932, he published the German-language collection of interviews Wege zum Friede ("Path toward Peace"). His other travels into Bulgaria, where he represented Romanian vegetarians at an international congress, were discussed in his 1933 volume Bulgaria necunoscută ("Unknown Bulgaria"). The volume Cosmometápolis, about the creation of a world government, was first published in Bucharest by Cultura Poporului imprint, and reissued in Paris by Mignolet et Storz.

Relgis' participation in left-wing causes was attacked at home by the antisemitic and proto-fascist National-Christian Defense League, whose press organ Înfrățirea Românească alleged that "squire Siegler" and his Umanitarismul, together with the Women's International League for Peace and Freedom, were fostering communist agitation. After the 1933 establishment of a Nazi regime in Germany, Relgis' books of interviews became subject to ceremonial burnings.

By that moment in his career, Relgis became a contributor to Vremea newspaper and to Ion Pas' political and art magazine, Șantier. The latter periodical was close to the Romanian Social Democratic Party, and had a strongly anti-fascist agenda. It published, in 1932, the Relgis essay Europa cea tânără ("Young Europe"), which talked about civilization, imperialism and war. Relgis' contributions to Șantier also include a January 12, 1934 essay about "anonymous works" and their impact on art history, which was later quoted in Viața Românească. The same year, Relgis published the novel Prieteniile lui Miron ("Miron's Friendships") with Editura Cugetarea.

In his subsequent activity as a journalist and publisher, Relgis combined his humanitarianism with topical interests. He was by then an advocate of eugenics, an interest reflected in his 1934 (or 1935) tract Umanitarism și eugenism ("Humanitarianism and Eugenism"), published by Editura Vegetarianismul company. In 1936, he also released the collection Esseuri despre iudaism ("Essays on Judaism") with Cultura Poporului. He was at the time active within the Jewish Cultural Institute, an annex of the Bucharest Choral Temple. His international activity peaked during the Spanish Civil War, when he helped organize anarchist support for the Spanish Republican regime, elected Councilor of the International Antifascist Solidarity.

=== World War II, persecution and departure ===
Eugen Relgis was still active on the literary scene during the first two years of World War II, before Romania formalized its military alliance with the Axis powers. The Phoney War caught him in France, but he returned to Romania shortly after, exposing himself to persecution by the growing Romanian fascist movements. In February 1940, he gave a retrospective lecture, republished by the newspaper L'Indépendance Roumaine, on the work of Austrian psychoanalyst Sigmund Freud. Another book of his political prose, Spiritul activ ("The Active Spirit"), saw print the same year.

The emergence of antisemitic and fascist regimes (see Romania in World War II, Holocaust in Romania) signified the beginning of Relgis' marginalization. During the short-lived National Legionary State, established by the Iron Guard fascists between 1940 and early 1941, the author lived in seclusion. His Biblioteca Cercului Libertatea was banned in 1940, but Relgis secretly moved the books into a stable. After the Guard fell from power, the Ion Antonescu dictatorship still included Relgis on a nationally circulated list of banned Romanian Jewish authors, but Relgis continued to write. His texts of the time include a posthumous praise of his pacifist disciple Iosif Gutman, the son of a Bucharest rabbi, who had been killed during the Bucharest pogrom. The essay was planned as part of Rabbi Gutman's volume Slove de martiri ("Notes by Martyrs"), which, although anti-Guard, was not given Antonescu's imprimatur. Relgis was however able to publish an article in the Jewish-only magazine Renașterea Noastră, on the occasion of Iosif's yahrtzeit, where he compared the Gutmans to Laocoön and His Sons. Relgis' own son fled Romania in 1942, and settled in Argentina.

A final period in Relgis' Romanian activity came after the August 1944 Coup toppled Antonescu and denounced Romania's Axis alliance. In 1945, he was dedicated a public celebration at the Jewish Cultural Institute, which included a speech by Chief Rabbi Alexandru Șafran. Slove de martiri was eventually published that year, and a revised Romanian edition of Petru Arbore saw print in 1946. Also then, he completed work on an essay about Nazism, The Holocaust and sexuality: Eros în al treilea Reich ("Eros in the Third Reich"). Relgis was again active in the political press, lending his signature to several independent newspapers: Sebastian Șerbescu's Semnalul, Tudor Teodorescu-Braniște's Jurnalul de Dimineață etc. He described himself as diametrically opposed to the process of communization, as well as to the Soviet occupation of Romania.

With refugee status, having reportedly been singled out for arrest by the Romanian Communist Party officials, Relgis departed from Romania in 1947, shortly before the communist regime took hold. After a brief stay in Paris, he spent some time in Argentina, with his son and his female companion Ana Taubes. He later went to Montevideo, in Uruguay, where he lived the remainder of his life. At home, his works were included in an official Publicații interzise ("Works Forbidden from Publishing") list, published by the communist censorship apparatus.

During his last decades, Eugen Relgis dedicated himself to sociological research and political activism. He embarked on a series of university lectures, which carried him throughout Uruguay, Argentina and Brazil. In 1950, he founded an international anarchist archive in Montevideo, reportedly one of the few political libraries in South America at the time of its creation. The effort was supported by the exiled Spanish anarchist Abraham Guillén, and received documentary funds from Europe, but reputedly drew suspicion from Uruguay police forces, and was consequently shut down.

=== South American career ===
With noted help from anarchist translator Vladimiro Muñoz, Relgis began his new career as a Spanish-language writer and publicist with a succession of works. Umanitarism și eugenism was translated into a Spanish edition: Humanitarismo y eugenismo, Ediciones Universo, Toulouse, 1950. The same imprint released his essay Las aberraciones sexuales en la Alemania nazi ("Sexual Aberrations in Nazi Germany"), which discussed in some depth the characteristics of Nazi eugenics. Also in 1950, with his Montevideo printing office Ediciones Humanidad, Relgis released a Spanish edition of his Principiile, a version of Max Nettlau's World Peace volume, as well as reissuing Cosmometápolis. Two years later, Ediciones Humanidad published Relgis' biographical essay Stefan Zweig, cazador de almas ("Stefan Zweig, the Soul Hunter"), followed in 1953 by a Hachette version of De mis peregrinaciones europeas ("From My Wanderings in Europe"). Relgis also tried to get his contributions translated into Portuguese, asking anarchist philosopher José Oiticica for assistance. He was at the time employed by El Plata daily, editing its Wednesday literary page, and helping to discover, in 1954, the twelve-year-old poet Teresa Porzecanski.

In 1954, Relgis printed another biographical study, on Romain Rolland: El hombre libre frente a la barbarie totalitaria ("A Free Man Confronts Totalitarian Barbarity"). The following year, he gave a public lecture at the University of the Republic, titled "A Writer's Confession", and reissued Esseuri despre iudaism as Profetas y poetas. Valores permanentes y temporarios del judaísmo ("Prophets and Poets. The Permanent and Timely Values of Judaism"). A Spanish version of Umanitarism sau Internaționala intelectualilor was published, as El Humanitarismo, by Editorial Americalee in Buenos Aires (1956). One edition of the latter was prefaced by Nicolai, who was at the time living in Argentina. In November 1956, the same company issued Relgis' Diario de otoño ("Autumn Diary"), a collection of notes he had kept during the war years. Another tract, Albores de libertad ("Dawns of Freedom"), was prefaced by Rudolf Rocker, the anarcho-syndicalist thinker.

In 1958, the University of the Republic published Eugen Relgis' acclaimed political essay Perspectivas culturales en Sudamérica ("Cultural Perspectives in South America"), for which he received a prize from the Uruguayan Ministry of Public Instruction and Social Prevision. Relgis' reputation was consolidated in the intellectual circles and, in 1955, his name was unsuccessfully advanced for the Nobel Peace Prize. The same year, a volume of his collected Spanish texts and studies on his work was published in Montevideo, as Homenaje a Eugen Relgis en su 60º aniversario ("Homage to Eugen Relgis on His 60th Anniversary").

Relgis returned to poetry in 1960 and 1961, with the volumes En un lugar de los Andes ("Some Place in the Andes") and Locura ("Madness"), both translated by Pablo R. Troise. They were followed by two other booklets, also in Troise's translation: Corazones y motores ("Hearts and Engines", 1963), Últimos poemas ("The Last Poems", 1967). His complete Obras ("Works") were published over the next decades, while the essay ¿Qué es el humanitarismo? Principios y acción ("What Is Humanitarianism? Principles and Action") went through several successive editions and featured a prologue by Albert Einstein. Another one of Relgis' Spanish-language volumes, Testigo de mi tiempo ("A Witness of My Time"), with more essays on Judaism, came in 1961. His leading eugenics and sexology treatise, Historia sexual de la Humanidad ("The Sexual History of Humanity"), was also published in 1961 (Libro-Mex Editores, Mexico City), and, in 1965, his biography of Nicolai saw print in Buenos Aires.

=== Final years and death ===
In 1962, Eugen Relgis visited Israel and Jerusalem, tightening his links with the Romanian Israeli community, including the Menora Association and Rabbi David Șafran. It was in Israel that Relgis published another volume of memoirs, in his native Romanian language: Mărturii de ieri și de azi ("Testimonies of Yesterday and Today"). In 1972, he was made an honorary staff member of the Hebrew University of Jerusalem.

From the early 1960s, Relgis was in correspondence with figures in the Italian radical circles, such as the anarchist Gaspare Mancuso. In 1964, Mancuso and Regis' other Italian disciples founded the political journal Quaderini degli amici di Eugen Relgis ("The Friends of Eugen Relgis Notebooks"). He also became an occasional contributor to Mujeres Libres, the Spanish anarcha-feminist tribune in the United Kingdom. During the 1960s and '70s, as a spell of liberalization occurred in Nicolae Ceaușescu's Romania, Relgis was again in contact with Romanian intellectuals. Before the massive earthquake of 1977 devastated Bucharest, he was in regular correspondence with scholar Mircea Handoca.

Eugen Relgis lived the final decade of his life as a pensioner of the Uruguayan state—in 1985, a law raised his pensión graciable to 20,000 new pesos a month. In the 1980s, Relgis was exchanging letters with Romanian cultural historian Leon Volovici, and entertained thoughts about a recovery of his work by Romanian critics and historians. He died before this could happen, in Montevideo, at age 92.

== Political doctrine ==
=== Main ideas ===
Throughout his career, Relgis was the proponent of anarchism. The Romanian writer spoke about the negativity of "state fetishism", seeking to overturn it and create "universal fraternity", and, in Diario de otoño, postulated a necessary distinction between Law ("which may be interpreted for or against") and Justice ("elementary" and unavoidable). Relgis likewise believed that war could be overcome once humanity shall have toppled "the three idols: State, Property, Money." Political philosopher Ángel Cappelletti argues: "Relgis was not an anarchist militant, but was always close to libertarian ideas".

According to Stefan Zweig, Relgis fought "tirelessly for the great goal of spiritual fraternity." The sentiment was echoed by Romain Rolland, who recognized in Relgis his disciple: "There is no other European man in whose hands I could place, with as much confidence, [...] my pacifist and universalist idea, for it to be passed on into the future. For none other has such far-reaching intelligence to this goal, and none other would feel this idea so intimately connected to his being." Speaking from the cultural mainstream, Romanian literary historian George Călinescu observed Relgis' anti-establishment and anti-artistic rhetoric, but described it as mere "idealist reverie", "without any daring proposals that would threaten our self-preservation instincts". Contrarily, scholar William Rose sees Relgis as "an idealist deeply preoccupied by social problems", "a practical and not a utopian thinker", and a theorist aware that social or economic evolution was needed before his goals could be achieved.

Relgis' humanitarianism (also known as humanism or pan-humanism; Spanish: humanitarismo) was a practical extension of anarcho-pacifism. William Rose describes this doctrine as both "universalist and pacifist", noting that one of its leading purposes was to eliminate those things "which separate man from man and cause wars". Relgis himself spoke of his movement as a form of "active thought", and "a critical method applied to natural, human and social realities", while expressing admiration for the nonviolent resistance tactics advocated in British India by Mohandas Karamchand Gandhi or Rabindranath Tagore. At the time, he attacked all forms of pan-nationalism, from Pan-Germanism to Pan-European nationalism, defining pan-humanism as "the only 'pan' that can be accepted as a natural law of the human species". In El humanitarismo, he called all internationalist movements, except his own, corrupted by "the practice of violence and intolerance".

Writing in 1933, the leftist literary columnist Ion Clopoțel stressed that Relgis' vision combined humanitarianism with "a lively, dynamic and innovating socialism". Although left-wing, Relgis' vision also incorporated militant anti-communism. As noted by literary historian Geo Șerban, he was from early on skeptical about the outcome of "social revolutions" and Bolshevik insurgency. In the first issue of Umanitarianismul, Relgis criticized both the far right and the far left, noting that his ideology was "apolitical, in fact antipolitical". In Europa cea tânără, he referred to the Soviet Union as the home of "proletarian imperialism". These thoughts were detailed by Diario de otoño, which drew a direct comparison between the Red Army, pushing Romania into an "armed peace", and the Wehrmacht.

=== Judaism, Zionism, Jewish culture ===
Beginning in the late 1920s, Relgis was also a supporter of Zionism, convinced that the path of Jewish assimilation was unsatisfactory for the affirmation of Jewish talents. He also adhered to philosopher Martin Buber's ideas about reuniting the three paths chosen by diaspora Jews: universalism, Zionism and Conservative Judaism. In his 1929 Avodah conference, he analyzed the ongoing Jewish resettlement into the Land of Israel, and investigated the causes of violent clashes between Jewish migrants and the Palestine Arabs. In other public statements, Relgis proudly stated his Judaic faith, noting that he had never actually left Judaism, "being integrated into its vast reality by the very reality of my own preoccupations, sociological and ethical, humanitarianist and pacifist." However, he explained to Iosif Gutman that joining a Zionist organization was not worth the effort, since membership was a form of captivity, and elsewhere suggested that Zionism was justified only as long as it did not follow "the restrictive methods of vulgar nationalism." The writer also described himself as committed to Romanian culture, and, as late as 1981, noted that Romanian was still his language of choice.

His essays on Judaism (some of which were dedicated to his father David) speak about the threat of societal collapse, which the author connected with mankind's spiritual decline after World War I. His theory on "dehumanization" postulated: "the spiritual evolution of mankind has proceeded to descent just as mankind is progressing in material terms." As a reversal of this trend, Relgis proposed a return to the roots of Judaism, in whose monotheism and Messianism he decoded the basic representation of moral responsibility, and the immediate precursors of Christianity. The Romanian writer was interested in those aspects of Jewish ethics which anticipated humanitarianism or pacifism, citing the Bible as "that most humane book", and identifying himself with the lament of Malachi 2:10 ("Why do we deal treacherously every man against his brother, profaning the covenant of our fathers?"). He later wrote that Jews, and Israelis in particular, were entrusted with keeping alive "the ancient wisdom, poetry and faith", with creating "new values from the old ones". Defining in his own terms the relationship between Biblical proto-universalism and 20th century humanitarianism, Relgis wrote: "Judaism is comprised into modern humanitarianism like a flame within a crystal globe."

In tandem, he rejected those aspects of Judaism or Christianity which he believed where bigotry, and his pacifist discourse criticized all religions as potential instigators or ideological props of hawkish rhetoric. He reserved special criticism for the notions of a "vengeful God" and "Jewish chosenness", arguing that they are "primitive", and expressed more sympathy for Buddhist universalism. His texts, including the 1922 Apel către..., are thought by some to be purposefully reusing the pro-universalist vocabulary of Freemasons.

Relgis' Judaic-themed tracts cover a wide range of subjects. In several of them, Relgis concentrates on the Biblical prophet Moses, in whom he sees the symbol of "great human aspirations". Some texts trace the impact of Moses' teaching on more modern authors (from Baruch Spinoza to Charles Darwin), others talk about secular Jewish culture, and still others focus on individual Jewish personalities: Buber, Edmond Fleg, Theodor Herzl. As a critic, he also investigated the survival of ancient Judaic themes in the modern art of Marcel Janco, Lazăr Zin or Reuven Rubin, and in the literature of Zweig, S. Ansky, Mendele Mocher Sforim and even Marcel Proust. Other such writings are individual portraits of Romanian Jewish men of letters, from A. L. Zissu and Iosif Brucăr to Avram Steuerman-Rodion and Enric Furtună. According to Geo Șerban, Relgis spent much of his later career promoting "a more fertile awareness of the links between Judaism and the modern world."

A critic of antisemitism, Eugen Relgis also dedicated some of his main works in the essay genre to the cause of anti-fascism. Early on, he exposed claims about Judeo-Masonic domination as canards, and noted that antisemitism was a negative reaction to the Jews' own status as natural innovators in both politics and culture. He wrote: "I take antisemitism to be that psychological disease whose manifestations display the characteristics of a phobia, that is to say an obsession. When someone is obsessed with an image, an individual or even a collective entity, these become the center of their world—and all causes and effects, no matter how far apart and different from each other, are connected to the initial obsession."

Writing in 1946, shortly after the scale of The Holocaust became known to Romanian Jews, Relgis gave credit to the popular, but since challenged rumor that Nazis fabricated human soap. Historian of ideas Andrei Oișteanu analyzes Relgis' text as more of a reaction to Nazism's own obsessive take on cleanliness, and writes that, at that time, Jews and Christians in Romania had been collecting certain brands of German soap and burying them as human remains.

=== On Latin America ===
After his move to Uruguay, Relgis developed a personal theory on Latin America as a "neohumanist" continent. Earlier, in Europa cea tânără, Relgis had claimed that the European continent needed to revisit its "pathetic history" of violence and imperialism, and reconvert by combining the lessons of Eastern philosophy and United States models of industrialization. Both models, he warned, carried risks: Asia's "spiritual renunciations" were mirrored by a "cancer of machinism" in North America.

With Perspectivas culturales en Sudamérica, he expanded on a distinction between civilization and culture: the former as a transitory phase in human development, the latter as a permanent and characteristic sum of ideas; civilization, he argued, was in existence within the New World, but a Latin American culture was still ahead. Relgis identified this as a merit, describing South America in general and Uruguay in particular as exceptionally fertile and a "healthier" example for the whole world, offering safe haven to independent thinkers and defying the ideological divisions of the Cold War era. Summarizing the future links between the Latin American regions and Europe as envisaged by Relgis, William Rose wrote: "the cultural mission of America consists in a careful selection of the eternal and universal values of Europe and their assimilation [...] to create typically American values that later, transcending the limits of this continent, will carry their message of peace and fraternity to the entire world." Latin America, Relgis cautioned, should leave behind its own traditions of dictatorial government, fanaticism and "utilitarian mentality", while fighting the "false moral" of North America; it could thus contribute to the cultural renaissance of a Europe corrupted by totalitarianism and imperialism. Also important in Relgis' assessment was Latin America's capacity to resist modern dehumanization by granting a social role to its intellectuals, an idea impressed upon him by the writings of Uruguayan humanist José Enrique Rodó.

Relgis' theory was received with interest by some of his South American colleagues. One was Argentine poet and historian Arturo Capdevila, who wrote about Relgis as a "meritorious" visionary with a "grave and vital message", assuring him: "You can say from now on that you did not suffer in vain, gravely and deeply, the sorrows of the spirit. Your voice will be heard; all of your lesson will be applied." Those Uruguayan public figures who paid homage to Relgis on his 60th anniversary included Socialist Party leader Emilio Frugoni, Colorado Party politician Amílcar Vasconcellos, Zionist academic Joel Gak and poet Carlos Sabat Ercasty. While comparing Relgis' pacifist message with the legendary warnings of Antigone, Frugoni's praise was somewhat skeptical, noting that the Romanian's projects, however grand, could find themselves in disagreement with "the constricting reality". Reviewing such appraisals, Uruguayan philosopher Agustín Courtoisie calls Relgis "eccentric and genial", and sees in him a real-life version of characters in Jorge Luis Borges' fantasy literature.

=== Eugenics ===
Like other intellectuals of his generation, Eugen Relgis believed that biology served to explain the background of "social and cultural problems that influence the intellectual movement." Controversially, he merged his anarchist perspective with support for eugenics, advocating universal birth control and compulsory sterilization in cases of "degeneration". According to Agustín Courtoisie: "Anarchist pacifism and the once fashionable eugenics seem to be the concepts one can associate with [Relgis]". In favoring this option, Relgis identified himself with those of his anarchist forerunners who were also dedicated neo-Malthusians, and especially with Manuel Devaldès. He praised Devaldès' call for vasectomy as a regulatory practice, calling the procedure "a true revolution" in population growth. His works defended other anarchists who recommended the practice, including the tried anarchist eugenists Norbert Bardoseck and Pierre Ramus. According to Romanian biomedicine historian Marius Turda, Relgis was among the social scientists who, in 1930s Romania, "forced [eugenic sterilization] into the realm of public debate".

Turda also notes that Umanitarism și eugenism went beyond sterilization advocacy to propose the involuntary euthanasia of "degenerate" individuals: those with "pathological characteristics or incurable diseases." Relgis' call to action in eugenics came with a provision: "It is, however, preferable, from all points of view, that degenerates should not be born, or, even better, not conceived." His views on this subject included an economic rationale, since, he argued, the community could not be expected to provide for sexually "prolific", but otherwise "degenerate", individuals. To this goal, he supported abortion, both for eugenic and pro-choice reasons. Relgis also argued: "Instead of natural selection, man should practice rational selection." With Las aberraciones sexuales..., Relgis condemned Nazi eugenics as barbaric, but agreed that those identified as "sub-humans" needed to be reeducated and (if "incurable") sterilized by non-Nazi physicians.

In this context, Relgis identified multiracial society as a positive paradigm. The emergence of an exemplary Latin American culture was conceived by Relgis as running parallel to a future American racial type. In this, Relgis saw the "integral man" of his humanitarianism, "healthy and strong", with a mind unbound by "super-refined culture", and without the traumatic experience of "tyrannical ideologies". The idea, Rose noted, was somewhat similar to, but "more universal" than, the Cosmic Race theory of Mexican academic José Vasconcelos.

== Literary contribution ==
=== Literary style and principles ===
Eugen Relgis blended a critique of capitalism, advocacy of internationalism and modern art interest with all his main contributions to literature. In his essays and "all too cerebral" novels, George Călinescu argues, Eugen Relgis was "obsessed with humanitarianism" and self-help techniques. With his 1934 piece for Șantier, Relgis divided the experience and nature of art into a primordial, collective, form and a newer, individualist one: in the past, Relgis noted, creativity was consumed into creating vast anonymous works ("the pyramid, the temple, the cathedral"), often demanding "the silent and tenacious effort of successive generations." Presently, he thought, the combat against the "imperative of Profit" and "vulgar materialism" justified the "ethical and aesthetic individualism". Relgis' essay described industrial society in harsh terms, as directed by "the bloody gods" of "Capitalism and War", and cautioned that the advocacy of anonymity in modern art could lead to kitsch ("serialized production, without the significance it used to carry in bygone days"). Elsewhere, however, Relgis also argued that books needed to have a formative value, and that literature, unlike journalism, "needs to be the expression of length and depth."

Some of Relgis' preferences were shaped from his time at Fronda. Its art manifestos, described by Paul Cernat as "virtually illegible", announced radical ideals, such as art for art's sake through Neronian destruction: Qualis artifex pereo. Leon Baconsky, a historian of Romanian Symbolism, notes that all Frondistes were at the time enthusiastic followers of French literary theorist Remy de Gourmont, to whom Cernat adds philosopher Henri Bergson and Epicurean thinker Jean-Marie Guyau (both of them dedicated "prolix-metaphoric commentary" in the review's pages). In matters of poetics, the group declared its deep admiration for the loose Symbolism of Tudor Arghezi (whose poems were amply reviewed by all three Fronda issues) and, to a lesser extent, Ion Minulescu—according to Baconsky, Fronda was the first-ever voice in literary criticism to comment on Arghezi's work as an integral phenomenon.

The cause of pacifism infused Relgis' work as a writer: a contemporary, the literary critic Pompiliu Păltânea, believed that, with his contribution to Romanian literature, Relgis was part of a diverse anti-war "ideological" group of writers (alongside Felix Aderca, Ioan Alexandru Brătescu-Voinești, Barbu Lăzăreanu and some others). According to Călinescu, Relgis' literary ideal became "the living book", the immediate and raw rendition of an individual's experience, with such "idols" as Rolland, Zweig, Henri Barbusse, Heinrich Mann and Ludwig Rubiner. An additional influence was, according to poet-critic Boris Marian, European Expressionism, in fashion at the start of Relgis' career.

In addition to political essays and fiction, Relgis' prose includes contributions to travel literature, deemed "his most characteristic works" by William Rose. These writings include attempts by Relgis to illustrate in plastic terms the application of his ideology: Ion Clopoțel noted that, in his volume about interwar Bulgaria, Relgis went beyond the facade of "savage" Bulgarian militarism to depict the humanist, vegetarian and "Tolstoyan" civil society of that age. Bulgaria necunoscută also worked as a manifesto of anti-intellectualism, chastising the "demagogue" academics and praising the simplicity of "collective life". In a similar way, Relgis' scattered memoirs, among them Strămoșul meu, "David Gugumanul" ("My Ancestor, 'Nitwit David' "), shed intimate light on his ideas about Judaism.

Other such didactic texts detail Relgis' advice on the art of living. Glasuri în surdină is noted for depicting the disorientation of a young man who becomes deaf: Relgis' alter ego, Miron, finds that such a disability has turned his old friends into opportunistic exploiters, but his imaginative spirit and his (minutely chronicled) self-determination allow him to rebel and start over in life. However, deaf studies experts Trenton W. Batson and Eugene Bergman write, Miron "is not really representative of the deaf majority", leading a life of isolation and, out of despair, seeking out a miracle cure for deafness. Relgis' patron Eugen Lovinescu was especially critical of the work, judging its "self-analyzing" internal monologue as burdensome.

The Bildungsroman Petru Arbore is noted by Geo Șerban as a "rarity" in Romanian literature, "instructive despite its excessive rhetoricism." Eugen Lovinescu notes its traditional theme of social "inadaptation", which, to him, echoes the right-wing didacticism of Sămănătorul writers. Over the three volumes, the idealistic Arbore falls in love with women of various conditions, and, to the backdrop of World War I, tries to build a business as an army supplier. Relgis himself warned that the book should not be seen as his autobiography, but as the "spiritual mirror" of each reader. Lovinescu believed the work to be heavily influenced by Rolland's Jean-Christophe, lacking "inventiveness".

Called a "sweet volume of essays" by Clopoțel, Prieteniile lui Miron chronicles love and desire in relation to age and sex. The work shows a young girl losing and then regaining her faith in true love, a daring young man, "who mistakes love for sport", being rejected by his female companions, and lastly a mature couple whose love has undergone the test of friendship. Clopoțel praised the text for its "seriousness", "finesse" and "reflections enlightened by knowledge and responsibility", concluding: "[This is] a literature of moral health."

These characteristics were also discerned by critics in his various contributions to Latin American literature. Courtoisie found Diario de otoño, a book that is "miscellaneous, multithematic, [moving] between the poetic and the everyday", comparable to the Fermentario essays of Uruguay's Carlos Vaz Ferreira. According to critic William T. Starr, El hombre libre frente a la barbarie totalitaria and other such recollections reveal "more about Relgis than about Rolland".

=== Poetry ===
During his time at Fronda, Eugen Relgis and his fellow writers published collective, experimental and unsigned poems, largely echoing the influence of Arghezi and Minulescu, but, according to Cernat, "aesthetically monstrous". This perspective is echoed by Șerban, who notes that Relgis' debut as a poet was largely without "convincing results". In Triumful neființei, the main stylistic reference was, according to Lovinescu, the Romanian Symbolist prose poet Dimitrie Anghel, imitated to the point of "pastiche".

With time, Relgis developed a style deemed "the poetry of professions" by George Călinescu. According to Călinescu's classification, Relgis the poet is similar in this respect to fellow Symbolists Alexandru Tudor-Miu and Barbu Solacolu, but also to Simona Basarab, Leon Feraru, Cristian Sârbu and Stelian Constantin-Stelian. The same critic notes that Relgis "attempted, with some beautiful poetic suggestions, to establish a modern-era mythology with abstract gods [...] and other machinist monsters." Lovinescu describes the poet in Relgis as one who "survived" through humanitarian propaganda, returning "in a compact Verhaeren form, rhetorical and accumulative." Lovinescu includes the resulting works in a category of "descriptive" and "social" poems, relating Relgis to Feraru, Alice Călugăru, Aron Cotruș, Vasile Demetrius, Camil Petrescu and I. Valerian.

Relgis' poems, Călinescu notes, were individual portraits of industrial machinery ("The Elevator", "The Cement Mixer") or workers ("The Builder", "The Day Laborer"), as temples and deities; by "natural association", the critic suggests, Relgis applied the same technique in his lyrical homages to the very large animals ("The Giraffe", "The Elephant"), but "this requires greater means of suggestion". In one piece quoted by George Călinescu, Relgis showed a bricklayer contemplating the modern city from the top of a scaffolding structure:

De sus, pe schelele ușoare
Orașul îl cuprind întreg,
Masiv și dârz: —enormă stâncă
Ce-a fost ascunsă-n noapte-adâncă,
Și care s-a ivit sub soare
Prin străduinți a mii de ani—
Urcând încet, neînfrânat,
Prin forța micilor titani.

Translation:

Up there, on flimsy scaffolds,
I stare all across this city,
Massive and daring: —enormous rock
That was hidden into deepest night
And reemerged under the sun,
Millennial efforts behind it—
Climbing slowly, ceaselessly,
Fed by the force of tiny titans.

== Legacy ==
The political ideas of Eugen Relgis were largely incompatible with the totalitarianism prevalent in Romania between World War II and the Romanian Revolution of 1989: as Rose notes, the scholar was persecuted by "four dictatorial regimes in his native country". Before this, Șerban writes, Relgis' intellectual contacts may have stimulated public debate, even though the writer himself could not claim the status of "opinion maker". Likewise, Boris Marian describes Relgis as "almost forgotten" by Romanians after his self-exile. In addition to Iosif Gutman, Relgis' Jewish Romanian disciples included Fălticeni journalist Iacob Bacalu, founder of a Relgis Circle. According to journalist Victor Frunză, Relgis' targeting by communist censorship had a paradoxical antisemitic undertone, as one of the repressive measures which touched Jewish culture in general.

Attempts to recover Relgis' work were made during the latter half of Romanian communist rule and after the 1989, several of them from within the Romanian Jewish community. In April 1982, the Jewish cultural journal Revista Cultului Mozaic published Leon Volovici's note about Relgis and Judaism. Late in the 1980s, Volovici also contacted Relgis' surviving sisters, then Relgis himself, becoming curator of the manuscripts left behind by the philosopher upon his relocation to South America. These were later donated to the Philippide Institute of the Romanian Academy, where they are kept as the Eugen Relgis library fund.

Relgis enjoys a more enduring reputation abroad. Initially, his anarchist eugenics enjoyed some popularity among Spanish anarchists; his pacifism also inspired Llorenç Vidal Vidal, the Balearic poet and educator. Some of his tracts have been reissued after 2001, with the Anselmo Lorenzo Foundation (Confederación Nacional del Trabajo). Italian-language versions of his novels, poems and political tracts, including Cosmometápolis, were published by Gaspare Mancuso and his Libero Accordo group, over the 1960s and '70s.

By then, Relgis' works had been translated into fourteen languages, although they still remained largely unknown in the United States; Principiile umanitariste alone had been translated into some 18 languages before 1982. The popularization of Relgis' ideas in America was first taken up by reviews such as The Humanist and Books Abroad, while Oriole Press reprinted Muted Voices. A second revised edition of Profetas y poetas, prefaced by the Spanish intellectual Rafael Cansinos-Asséns, saw print in Montevideo (1981). At around the same time, in Mexico, his poems were being reprinted in Alfonso Camín's Norte literary review.

In addition to the Philippide Institute collection, part of Relgis' personal archive is being preserved in Jerusalem, at the National Library of Israel. His other notebooks and letters are kept in the Netherlands, at the International Institute of Social History. Relgis' likeness is preserved in drawings by Marcel Janco, Lazăr Zin, Louis Moreau and Carmelo de Arzadun.

== See also ==
- List of peace activists
