= De Lacaze =

de Lacaze is a French surname. Notable people with the surname include:

- Gérard de Lacaze-Duthiers (1876–1958), French anarchist writer
- Henri de Lacaze-Duthiers (1821–1901), French biologist, anatomist and zoologist
