= Duthiers =

Duthiers is a surname. Notable people with the surname include:

- Gérard de Lacaze-Duthiers (1876–1958), French anarchist writer
- Henri de Lacaze-Duthiers (1821–1901), French biologist, anatomist, and zoologist
- Vladimir Duthiers (born 1969), American television journalist
