= L'Endehors =

French anarchist newspaper

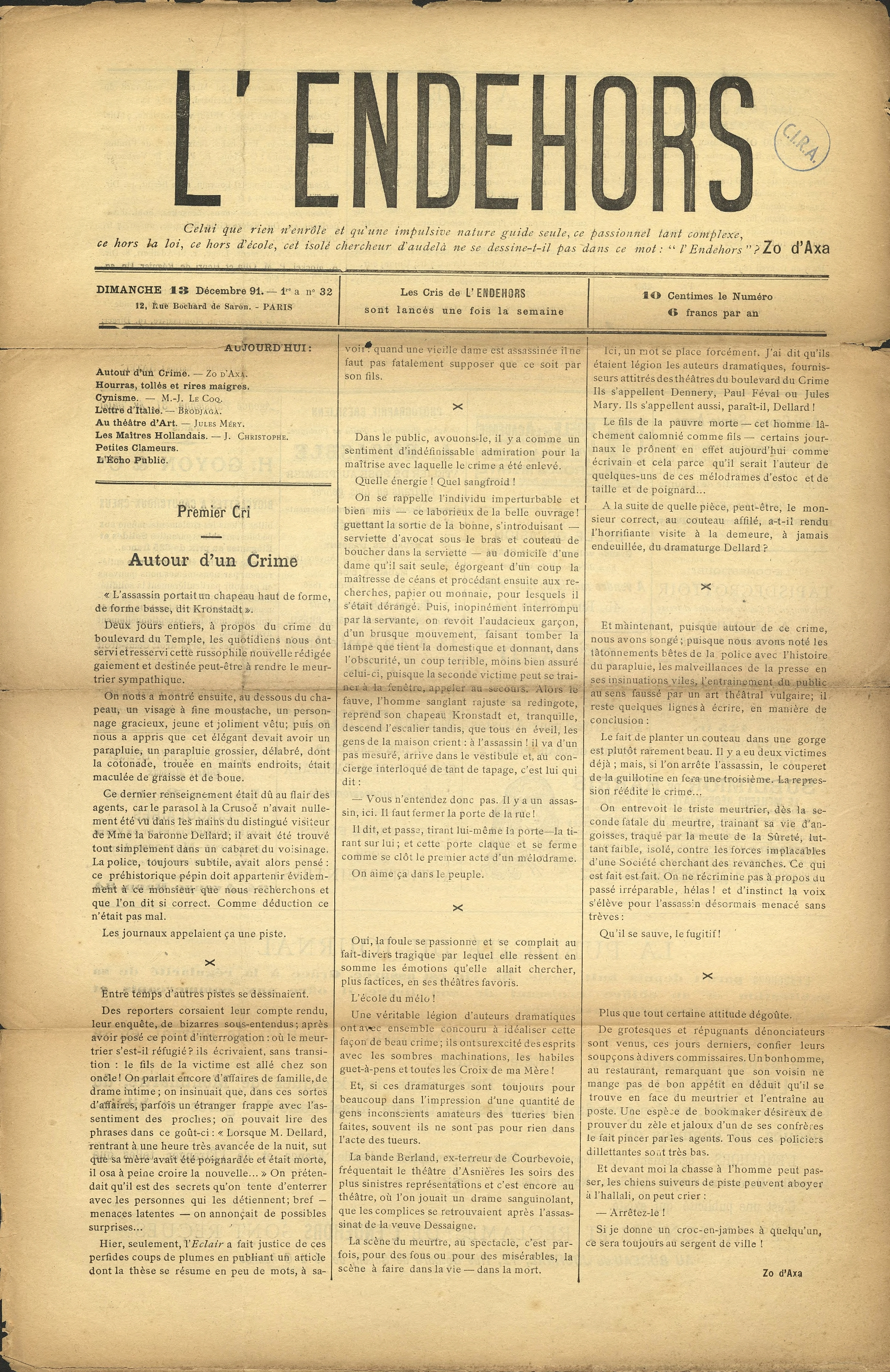
- Front page of the first l'Endehors (13 December 1891)
- Editor-in-chief: Zo d'Axa (1st); Émile Armand (2nd)
- Ceased publication: 1891-1893 (1st); 1922-1939 (2nd)
- Political alignment: Anarchism; Individualist anarchism
- Language: French
- Headquarters: Paris

l'Endehors and l'en dehors (French pronunciation: [lɑ̃dəɔʁ], The Outside/r) is the title of two distinct French anarchist periodicals.

The first was published by Zo d'Axa between 1891 and 1893. It was a prominent publication during the Ère des attentats (1892–1894). The journal brought together a significant number of figures from the anarchist and artistic circles of the time, particularly from individualist anarchism, though not exclusively. Alongside Le Père Peinard and Le Révolté, it was one of the three major publications of the golden age of anarchist press in France. Zo d'Axa's l'Endehors distinguished itself from its competitors by adopting a middle ground between them and placing a strong emphasis on literary and aesthetic subjects.

The second was published by E. Armand between 1922 and 1939 and also followed an individualist anarchist line. This second periodical was particularly interested in issues concerning interpersonal relationships and sexual freedom. Errico Malatesta was the only militant to publish in both journals.

== l'Endehors (1891-1893) ==
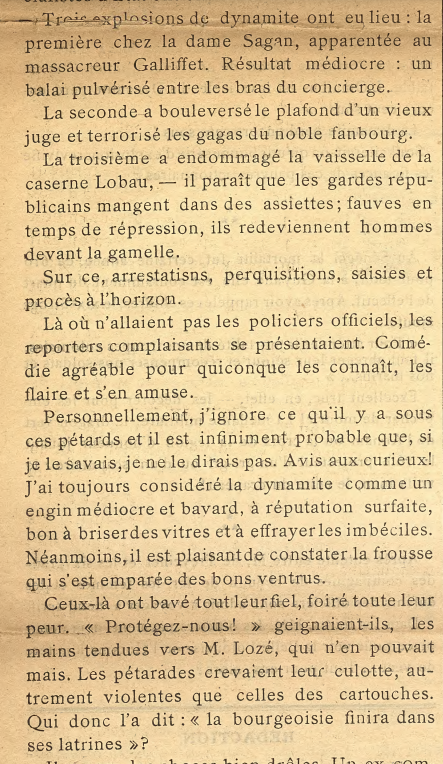
The fear by Charles Malato in L'Endehors (26 March 1892), at the beginning of the Ère des attentats.

The first journal l'Endehors was founded by Zo d’Axa, an anarchist writer, on 5 May 1891. Its members were closely linked with the ones who had published in La Révolution cosmopolite a few years earlier. Its exact title was l’Endehors, with a lowercase l and written as one word, as confirmed by the epigraph printed at the beginning of each issue:

The one whom nothing enrolls and whom an impulsive nature alone guides — that passionate and complex being, that outlaw, that outsider to schools, that solitary seeker of the beyond — is he not captured in this word: 'l’Endehors' (ie 'the Outside' or 'the Outsider')?

At the beginning of the Ère des attentats, the periodical was one of the most influential anarchist newspapers in France. It took a more radical line than Jean Grave and Peter Kropotkin’s Le Révolté—supporting the strategy of propaganda by the deed more fully than that rival. It responded to the first attacks with irony and mockery, for example in Charles Malato’s article The fear whereas Le Révolté remained rather reserved, and Le Père Peinard, the other major anarchist paper of the period in France, nearly entirely written by Émile Pouget, was in turn fully supportive of those methods. L’Endehors thus occupied a middle ground between La Révolte and Le Père Peinard. These more radical perspectives boosted the paper's sales, and, like Le Père Peinard, it became more widely read than Le Révolté, which was overtaken by its political moderation and read less by the base of anarchist militants. Richard Sonn described L’Endehors as the literary wing of the French anarchist press of the period, while Le Père Peinard belonged rather to the social wing and Le Révolté to the theoretical wing.

When Ravachol was arrested, Zo d'Axa proposed his help to the family and was also arrested. The paper was targeted by the Trial of the Thirty, a show trial of anarchists in France in 1894.

The full list of contributors was provided by the anarchist historian René Bianco, a specialist in anarchist press from the period. The complete list of individuals known to have contributed to the journal is as follows:

Paul Adam, Jean Ajalbert, Victor Barrucand, Baruch, Tristan Bernard, Boutin, Georges Brandal, Jules Braut, Ch. de Brhay, Brodjaga, Arthur Byl, O. Carrie, Paul Chabard, Louis Chalan, Charles Chatel, Henri Cholin, Jules Christophe, A. Cohen, Edmond Cousturier, Georges Darien, Étienne de Crept, Georges Deherme, Lucien Descaves, Gaston Dubois, Édouard Dubus, Sébastien Faure, Félix Fénéon, Henri Fevre, Eugène Gaillard, Georges Lecomte, René Ghil, Paul Gravelin, Émile Henry, A. Ferdinand Herold, Paul, Armand Hirsch, Marie Huot, Abbé Jouet, Bernard Lazare, Julien Leclercq, M. J. Le Oq, Paul Macon, Errico Malatesta, Charles Malato, Ludovic Malquin, Marie Malthuriel, Jean Manescau, Camille Marchand, Louis Matha, Gustave Mathieu, Camille Mauclair, Victor Meintore, Alexandre Mercier, Jules Méry, Louise Michel, Octave Mirbeau, Jean Mortsauf, Lucien Muhlfeld, Mathias Night, Théo Praxis, Pierre Quillard, Henri de Régnier, P. N. Roinard, Saint-Pol-Roux, Charles Saunier, Jan Steen, Théophile Steinlen, Joachim Stwot, Adolphe Tabarant, Pierre Veber, André Veidaux, Émile Verhaeren, Francis Vielé-Griffin, Michel Zévaco, Zo d’Axa.

== l'en dehors (1922-1939) ==
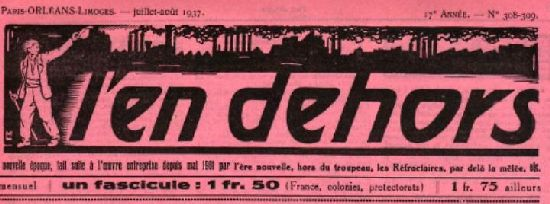
L'en dehors, 1937.

The second journal, l'en dehors (in two words), first appeared in 1922 under the direction of E. Armand (pen name of Ernest Juin). The publication was issued twice a month. E. Armand advocated for individual freedom both in the resolution of interpersonal matters and in the realm of sexual liberties. He extensively developed, in responses to letters from anarchist activists, his concept of sexual comradeship, according to which anarchists, in his view, should not place great importance on sexual relations among themselves—engaging in them out of comradeship and friendship, without attaching romantic or emotional significance. He also asserted that such practices should be guided by the free choice of individuals. The non-exhaustive list of individuals contributing to the journal, compiled by Bianco, is as follows:

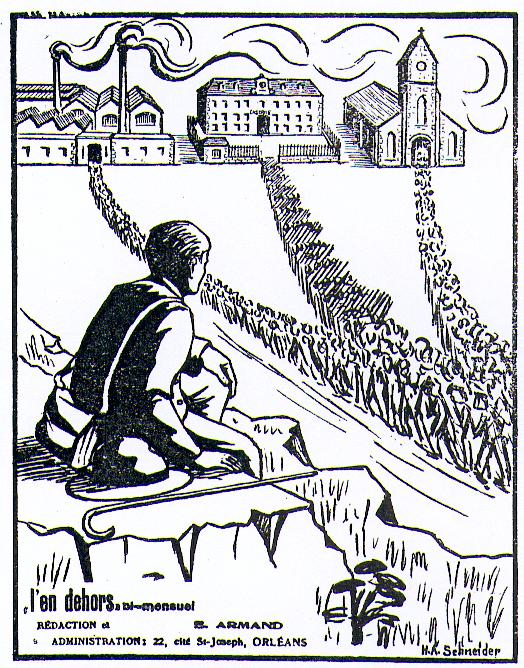
Depiction from l'en dehors

M. Acharya, E. Armand, H. Arrigoni, Cynthia Asquith, Aimé Bailly, A. Baillif, Banville d'Hostel, Lucien Barbedette, F.G. Beranger, Camillo Berneri, Edouard Bertran, Eugène Bevant, Eugène Bizeau, P. Bonniel, Charles-Auguste Bontemps, Benjamin de Cassères, Paul Caubet, Pierre Chardon, Hervé Coatmeur, Gigi Damiani, Hen Day, Marguerite Desprès, Manuel Devaldès, Ovide Ducauroy, Renée Dunan, Clément Duval, Fred Esmargès, Louis Estève (Louise Stevens), Fernand Fortin, Eliezer Fournier, Emilio Ganté, Gabriel Gobron, Urbain Gohier, Anatolii Horelik, G.M. Gouté, Joseph Grandjean, Grilliot de Givry, A. Guitton, Al.-L. Herrera, Eugène Humbert, Maurice Imbard, R.F. Ishill (Jacques Mesnil), Costa Iscar, Ixigrec, Marius Jean, Dr Kuntz-Robinson, Jo Labadie, Gérard de Lacaze-Duthiers, A. Laforge, Aristide Lapeyre, Dr Juan Lazarte, Albert Lecomte, Marc Lefort, Abel Léger, Dyer Lum, Augustin Mabilly, John Henry Mackay, Stephen Mac Say, Pierre Madel, Errico Malatesta, Dr G. Maranon, Pol Manylha, A. Mauzé, M.Lt. and J. Mayoux, Michael Monahan, Federica Montseny, Max Nettlau, Raoul Odin, Paul Pailliette, Marius Personneaux, Madeleine Pelletier, G. Pioch, P. Prat, Axel Rodinson Proskovsky, Leda Rafanelli, Pierre Ramis, Eugénie Ravet, Eugen Relgis, Anna Riedel, L. Rigaud, Georgette Ryner, Han Ryner, Sakountala, Clémentine Sautéjet, A. Scott, Henri Seyrmon, Louis Simon, Elie Soubeyran, Camille Spiess, Georgette Vidal, Maurice Wullens, Henri Zisly.

l'en dehors ceased publication in October 1939 after releasing 335 issues. After the war, E. Armand would go on to publish another periodical: L'Unique.

== See also ==
- List of anarchist periodicals
- Individualist anarchism in Europe

== Bibliography ==
- Eisenzweig, Uri (2001). Fictions de l'anarchisme [Fictions of anarchism] (in French). France: C. Bourgois. ISBN 2-267-01570-6.
- Sonn, Richard D. (1989). Anarchism and cultural politics in fin de siècle France. Nebraska: University of Nebraska Press. ISBN 9780803241756.
- Manfredonia, Gaetano (2000). E. Armand et "la camaraderie amoureuse" : Le sexualisme révolutionnaire et la lutte contre la jalousie [E. Armand and "amorous comradeship": revolutionary sexualism and the struggle against jealousy] (PDF) (in French). International Institute of Social History (IISH).
