= Anarchism in France =

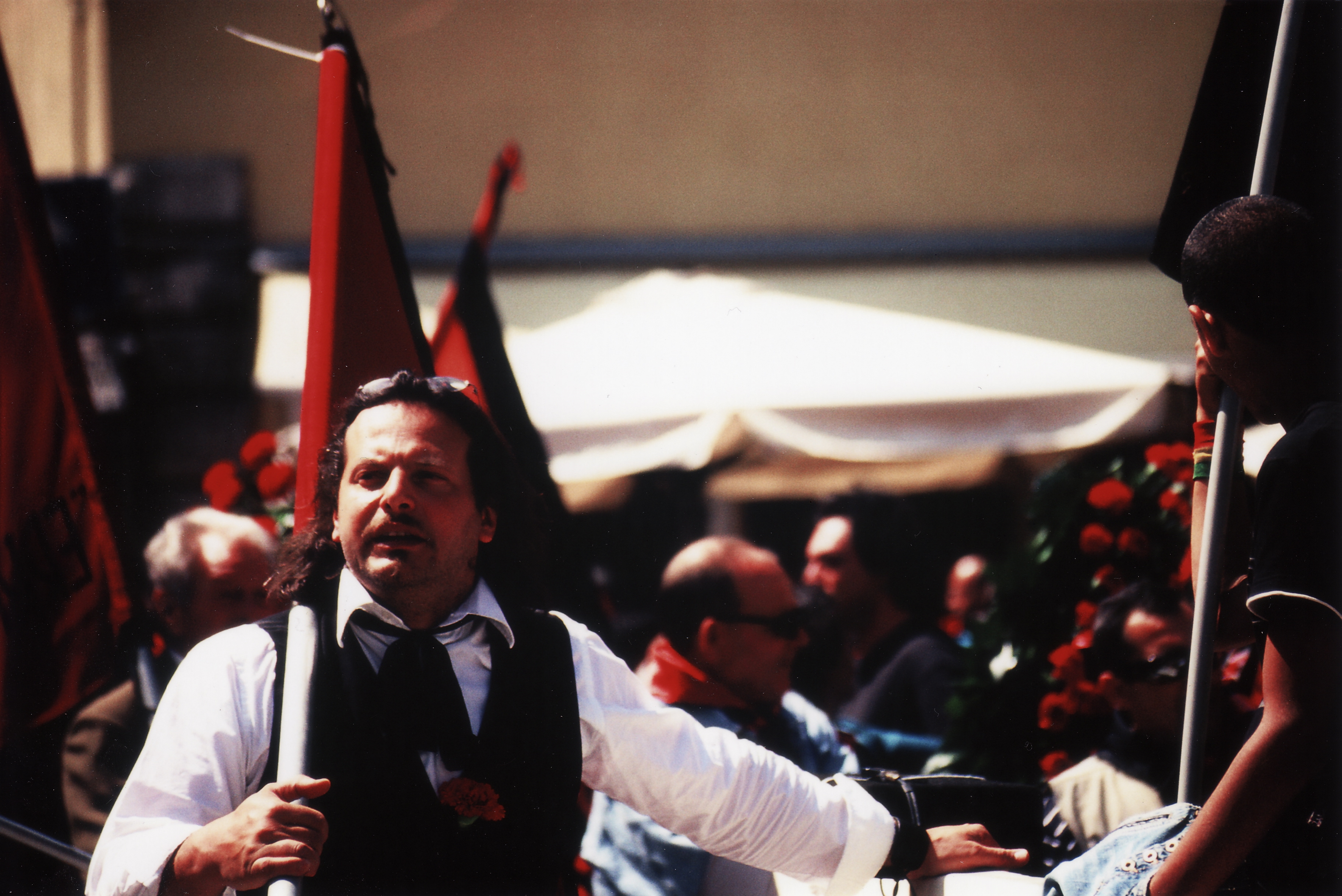
Anarchists in France

Anarchism in France (French: Anarchisme) can trace its roots to thinker Pierre-Joseph Proudhon, who grew up during the Restoration and was the first self-described anarchist. French anarchists fought in the Spanish Civil War as volunteers in the International Brigades. According to journalist Brian Doherty, "The number of people who subscribed to the anarchist movement's many publications was in the tens of thousands in France alone."

== History ==
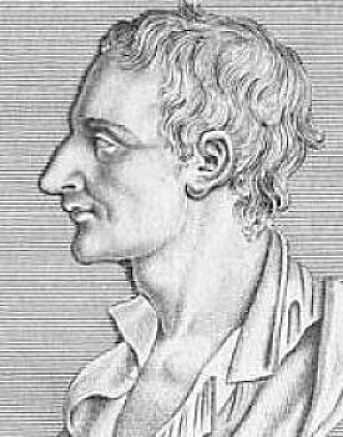
Sylvain Maréchal

The origins of the modern anarchist movement lie in the events of the French Revolution, which the historian Thomas Carlyle characterized as the "open violent Rebellion, and Victory, of disimprisoned Anarchy against corrupt worn-out Authority". Immediately following the storming of the Bastille, the communes of France began to organize themselves into systems of local self-government, maintaining their independence from the State and organizing unity between communes through federalist principles. Direct democracy was implemented in the local districts of each commune, with citizens coming together in general assemblies to decide on matters without any need for representation. When the National Constituent Assembly attempted to pass a law concerning the governance of the communes, the districts instantly rejected it as it had been constituted without their sanction, causing the scheme to be abandoned by its proponents.

In particular, the sans-culottes of the Paris Commune were denounced as "anarchists" by the Girondins. The Girondin Jacques Pierre Brissot spoke at length about the need for the extermination of the "anarchists", a group that did not form any political grouping in the National Convention, but nevertheless were active participants in the revolution and vocal opponents of the nascent bourgeoisie. The Enragés were among the defenders of the sans-culottes and expressed a form of proto-socialism that advocated for the transformation of France into a directly democratic "Commune of Communes", a call later taken up by the 19th century French anarchist movement. The Enragés attacked the bourgeoisie and the representational composition of the National Convention, which they opposed in favor of the sectional assemblies.

The conflict between the Paris Commune and the National Convention escalated into a "third revolution", as an insurrection was openly championed by the Enragés led by Jean-François Varlet, who desired to overthrow the convention and establish direct democracy throughout France. However, this attempted "revolution of anarchy" was defeated by the Girondins, partly due to a lack of support from the Jacobin Club and the National Guard. Nevertheless, the continuing escalation of the conflict and increasing radicalization culminated in the Insurrection of 31 May – 2 June 1793, during which the Girondins were purged from the Convention and the Montagnards took control, centralizing power in the hands of the Committee of Public Safety and leaving the direct democratic ambitions of the sans-culottes and Enragés completely unfulfilled.

With the beginning of the Reign of Terror, the Enragés underwent a campaign of repression by the committee, although the government also attempted to make some economic concessions in order to not alienate the sans-culottes. The Enragés leader Jacques Roux committed suicide after being called to trial by the Revolutionary Tribunal and by 1794 the Enragés had all but disappeared from public view. The Committee subsequently began to move against sectional democracy and undertook a vast bureaucratization of the state machinery, converting elected positions into ones appointed by the state and transferring power from the hands of the sectional assemblies into those of the government. The power of the sans-culottes began to wane as the Terror intensified, with the Hébertists and Dantonists also being suppressed. Eventually, the fall of Maximilien Robespierre brought an end to the Terror and the Thermidorian Reaction began to rollback many of the revolutionary changes that had taken place.

The lasted vestiges of revolutionary anarchism were expressed by the Conspiracy of the Equals, which advocated for the overthrow of the Directory and its replacement with a communist society. In his Manifesto of the Equals (1796), the proto-anarchist thinker Sylvain Maréchal demanded "the communal enjoyment of the fruits of the earth" and looked forward to the disappearance of "the revolting distinction of rich and poor, of great and small, of masters and valets, of governors and governed." The Conspiracy's attempt to overthrow the Directory failed and its leader François-Noël Babeuf was executed by guillotine, but their ideas carried on into the 19th century. Following the Napoleonic Wars and the restoration of monarchy, socialist and anarchist ideas inspired by the Enragés and Equals began to replace republican ideals, setting up a new framework for French radicalism that began to reach an apex during the time of the July Monarchy.

=== From the Second Republic to the Jura Federation ===
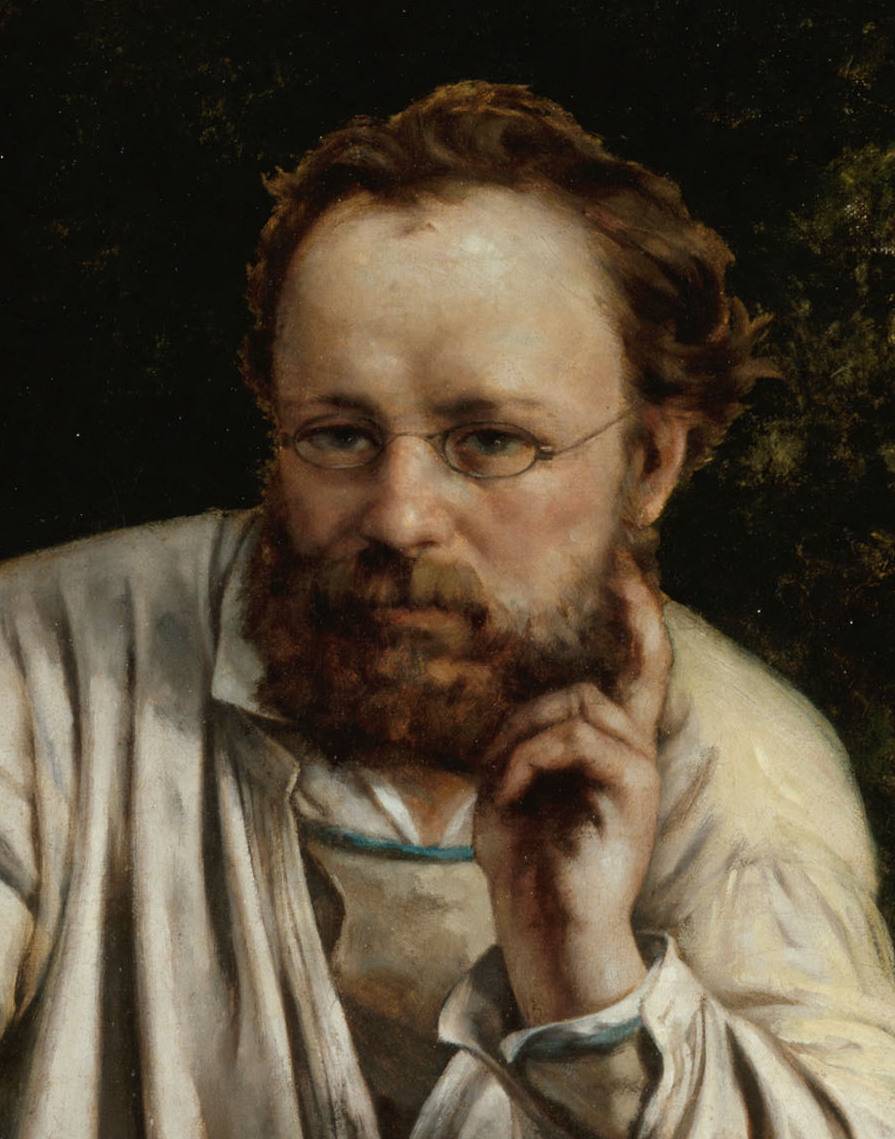
Pierre-Joseph Proudhon, the first self-identified anarchist

Pierre-Joseph Proudhon (1809–1865) was the first philosopher to label himself an "anarchist." Proudhon opposed government privilege that protects capitalist, banking and land interests, and the accumulation or acquisition of property (and any form of coercion that led to it) which he believed hampers competition and keeps wealth in the hands of the few. Proudhon favoured a right of individuals to retain the product of their labor as their own property, but believed that any property beyond that which an individual produced and could possess was illegitimate. Thus, he saw private property as both essential to liberty and a road to tyranny, the former when it resulted from labor and was required for labor and the latter when it resulted in exploitation (profit, interest, rent, tax). He generally called the former "possession" and the latter "property." For large-scale industry, he supported workers associations to replace wage labour and opposed the ownership of land.

Proudhon maintained that those who labor should retain the entirety of what they produce, and that monopolies on credit and land are the forces that prohibit such. He advocated an economic system that included private property as possession and exchange market but without profit, which he called mutualism. It is Proudhon's philosophy that was explicitly rejected by Joseph Déjacque in the inception of anarchist-communism, with the latter asserting directly to Proudhon in a letter that "it is not the product of his or her labor that the worker has a right to, but to the satisfaction of his or her needs, whatever may be their nature."

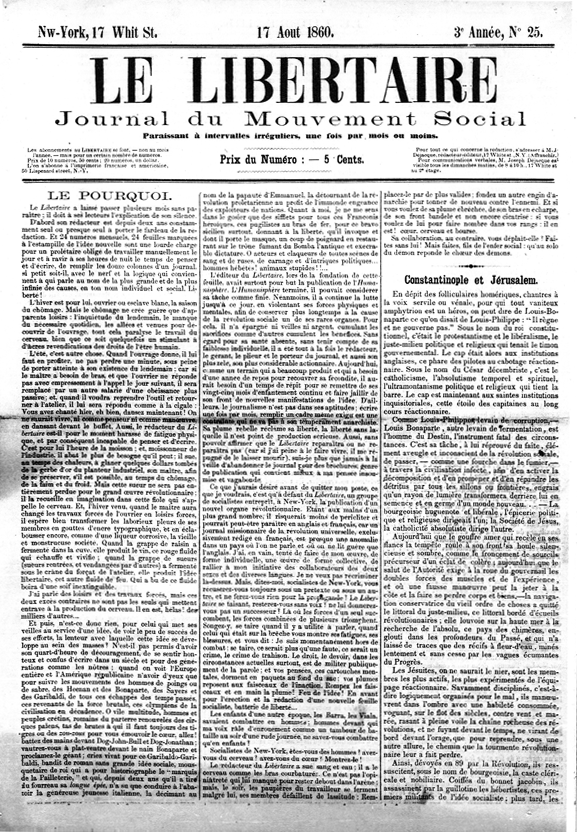
Le Libertaire, Journal du mouvement social. Libertarian Communist publication edited by Joseph Déjacque. This copy is of the August 17, 1860, edition in New York City.

An early anarchist communist was Joseph Déjacque, the first person to describe himself as "libertaire". Unlike Proudhon, he argued that, "it is not the product of his or her labor that the worker has a right to, but to the satisfaction of his or her needs, whatever may be their nature." According to the anarchist historian Max Nettlau, the first use of the term libertarian communism was in November 1880, when a French anarchist congress employed it to more clearly identify its doctrines. The French anarchist journalist Sébastien Faure, later founder and editor of the four-volume Anarchist Encyclopedia, started the weekly paper Le Libertaire (The Libertarian) in 1895.

Déjacque was a major critic of Proudhon. Déjacque thought that "the Proudhonist version of Ricardian socialism, centred on the reward of labour power and the problem of exchange value. In his polemic with Proudhon on women's emancipation, Déjacque urged Proudhon to push on 'as far as the abolition of the contract, the abolition not only of the sword and of capital, but of property and authority in all their forms,' and refuted the commercial and wages logic of the demand for a 'fair reward' for 'labour' (labour power). Déjacque asked: 'Am I thus... right to want, as with the system of contracts, to measure out to each — according to their accidental capacity to produce — what they are entitled to?' The answer given by Déjacque to this question is unambiguous: 'it is not the product of his or her labour that the worker has a right to, but to the satisfaction of his or her needs, whatever may be their nature.'"...For Déjacque, on the other hand, the communal state of affairs — the phalanstery 'without any hierarchy, without any authority' except that of the 'statistics book' — corresponded to 'natural exchange,' i.e. to the 'unlimited freedom of all production and consumption; the abolition of any sign of agricultural, individual, artistic or scientific property; the destruction of any individual holding of the products of work; the demonarchisation and the demonetarisation of manual and intellectual capital as well as capital in instruments, commerce and buildings.

Déjacque "rejected Blanquism, which was based on a division between the 'disciples of the great people's Architect' and 'the people, or vulgar herd,' and was equally opposed to all the variants of social republicanism, to the dictatorship of one man and to 'the dictatorship of the little prodigies of the proletariat.' With regard to the last of these, he wrote that: 'a dictatorial committee composed of workers is certainly the most conceited and incompetent, and hence the most anti-revolutionary, thing that can be found...(It is better to have doubtful enemies in power than dubious friends)'. He saw 'anarchic initiative,' 'reasoned will' and 'the autonomy of each' as the conditions for the social revolution of the proletariat, the first expression of which had been the barricades of June 1848. In Déjacque's view, a government resulting from an insurrection remains a reactionary fetter on the free initiative of the proletariat. Or rather, such free initiative can only arise and develop by the masses ridding themselves of the 'authoritarian prejudices' by means of which the state reproduces itself in its primary function of representation and delegation. Déjacque wrote that: 'By government I understand all delegation, all power outside the people,' for which must be substituted, in a process whereby politics is transcended, the 'people in direct possession of their sovereignty,' or the 'organised commune.' For Déjacque, the communist anarchist utopia would fulfil the function of inciting each proletarian to explore his or her own human potentialities, in addition to correcting the ignorance of the proletarians concerning 'social science.'"

After the creation of the First International, or International Workingmen's Association (IWA) in London in 1864, Mikhail Bakunin made his first tentative of creation an anti-authoritarian revolutionary organization, the "International Revolutionary Brotherhood" ("Fraternité internationale révolutionnaire") or the Alliance ("l'Alliance"). He renewed this in 1868, creating the "International Brothers" ("Frères internationaux") or "Alliance for Democratic Socialism".

Bakunin and other federalists were excluded by Karl Marx from the IWA at the Hague Congress of 1872, and formed in Switzerland the Jura Federation, which met the next year at the 1872 Saint-Imier Congress, where was created the Anarchist St. Imier International (1872–1877).

=== Anarchist participation in the Paris Commune ===
In 1870 Mikhail Bakunin led a failed uprising in Lyon on the principles later exemplified by the Paris Commune, calling for a general uprising in response to the collapse of the French government during the Franco-Prussian War, seeking to transform an imperialist conflict into social revolution. In his Letters to A Frenchman on the Present Crisis, he argued for a revolutionary alliance between the working class and the peasantry and set forth his formulation of what was later to become known as propaganda of the deed.

Anarchist historian George Woodcock reports that "The annual Congress of the International had not taken place in 1870 owing to the outbreak of the Paris Commune, and in 1871 the General Council called only a special conference in London. One delegate was able to attend from Spain and none from Italy, while a technical excuse - that they had split away from the Fédération Romande - was used to avoid inviting Bakunin's Swiss supporters. Thus only a tiny minority of anarchists was present, and the General Council's resolutions passed almost unanimously. Most of them were clearly directed against Bakunin and his followers." In 1872, the conflict climaxed with a final split between the two groups at the Hague Congress, where Bakunin and James Guillaume were expelled from the International and its headquarters were transferred to New York. In response, the federalist sections formed their own International at the St. Imier Congress, adopting a revolutionary anarchist program.

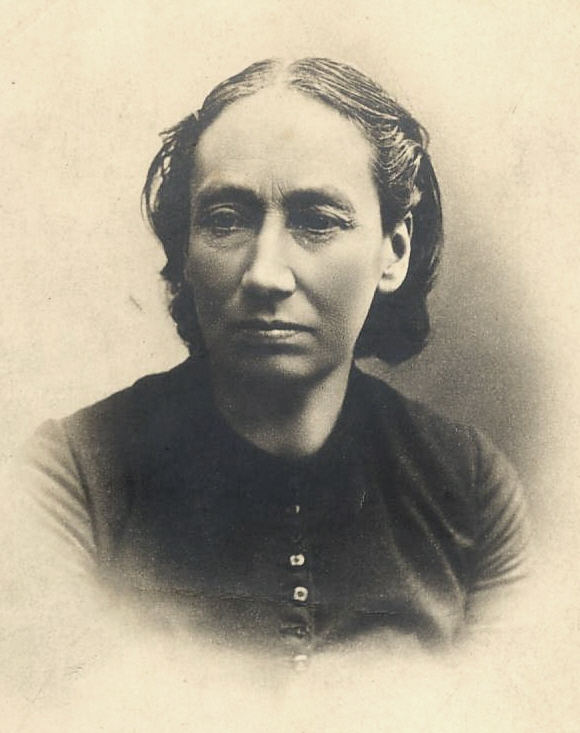
Louise Michel anarchist communard

The Paris Commune was a government that briefly ruled Paris from March 18 (more formally, from March 28) to May 28, 1871. The Commune was the result of an uprising in Paris after France was defeated in the Franco-Prussian War. Anarchists participated actively in the establishment of the Paris Commune. They included Louise Michel, the Reclus brothers, and Eugène Varlin (the latter murdered in the repression afterwards). As for the reforms initiated by the Commune, such as the re-opening of workplaces as co-operatives, anarchists can see their ideas of associated labour beginning to be realised...Moreover, the Commune's ideas on federation obviously reflected the influence of Proudhon on French radical ideas. Indeed, the Commune's vision of a communal France based on a federation of delegates bound by imperative mandates issued by their electors and subject to recall at any moment echoes Bakunin's and Proudhon's ideas (Proudhon, like Bakunin, had argued in favour of the "implementation of the binding mandate" in 1848...and for federation of communes). Thus both economically and politically the Paris Commune was heavily influenced by anarchist ideas.". George Woodcock manifests that "a notable contribution to the activities of the Commune and particularly to the organization of public services was made by members of various anarchist factions, including the mutualists Courbet, Longuet, and Vermorel, the libertarian collectivists Varlin, Malon, and Lefrangais, and the bakuninists Elie and Élisée Reclus and Louise Michel."

Louise Michel was an important anarchist participant in the Paris Commune. Initially she worked as an ambulance woman, treating those injured on the barricades. During the Siege of Paris she untiringly preached resistance to the Prussians. On the establishment of the Commune, she joined the National Guard. She offered to shoot Thiers, and suggested the destruction of Paris by way of vengeance for its surrender.

In December 1871, she was brought before the 6th council of war, charged with offences including trying to overthrow the government, encouraging citizens to arm themselves, and herself using weapons and wearing a military uniform. Defiantly, she vowed to never renounce the Commune, and dared the judges to sentence her to death. Reportedly, Michel told the court, "Since it seems that every heart that beats for freedom has no right to anything but a little slug of lead, I demand my share. If you let me live, I shall never cease to cry for vengeance."

Following the 1871 Paris Commune, the anarchist movement, as the whole of the workers' movement, was decapitated and deeply affected for years.

=== The propaganda of the deed period and exile to Britain ===
Parts of the anarchist movement, based in Switzerland, started theorizing propaganda of the deed. From the late 1880s to 1895, a series of attacks by self-declared anarchists brought anarchism into the public eye and generated a wave of anxieties. The most infamous of these deeds were the bombs of Ravachol, Emile Henry, and Auguste Vaillant, and the assassination of the President of the Republic Sadi Carnot by Caserio.

After Auguste Vaillant's bomb in the Chamber of Deputies, the "Opportunist Republicans" voted in 1893 the first anti-terrorist laws, which were quickly denounced as lois scélérates ("villainous laws"). These laws severely restricted freedom of expression. The first one condemned apology of any felony or crime as a felony itself, permitting widespread censorship of the press. The second one allowed to condemn any person directly or indirectly involved in a propaganda of the deed act, even if no killing was effectively carried on. The last one condemned any person or newspaper using anarchist propaganda (and, by extension, socialist libertarians present or former members of the International Workingmen's Association (IWA)):

"1. Either by provocation or by apology... [anyone who has] encouraged one or several persons in committing either a stealing, or the crimes of murder, looting or arson...; 2. Or has addressed a provocation to military from the Army or the Navy, in the aim of diverting them from their military duties and the obedience due to their chiefs... will be deferred before courts and punished by a prison sentence of three months to two years.

Thus, free speech and encouraging propaganda of the deed or antimilitarism was severely restricted. Some people were condemned to prison for rejoicing at the 1894 assassination of French president Sadi Carnot by the Italian anarchist Caserio. The term of lois scélérates ("villainous laws") has since entered popular language to design any harsh or injust laws, in particular anti-terrorism legislation which often broadly represses the whole of the social movements.

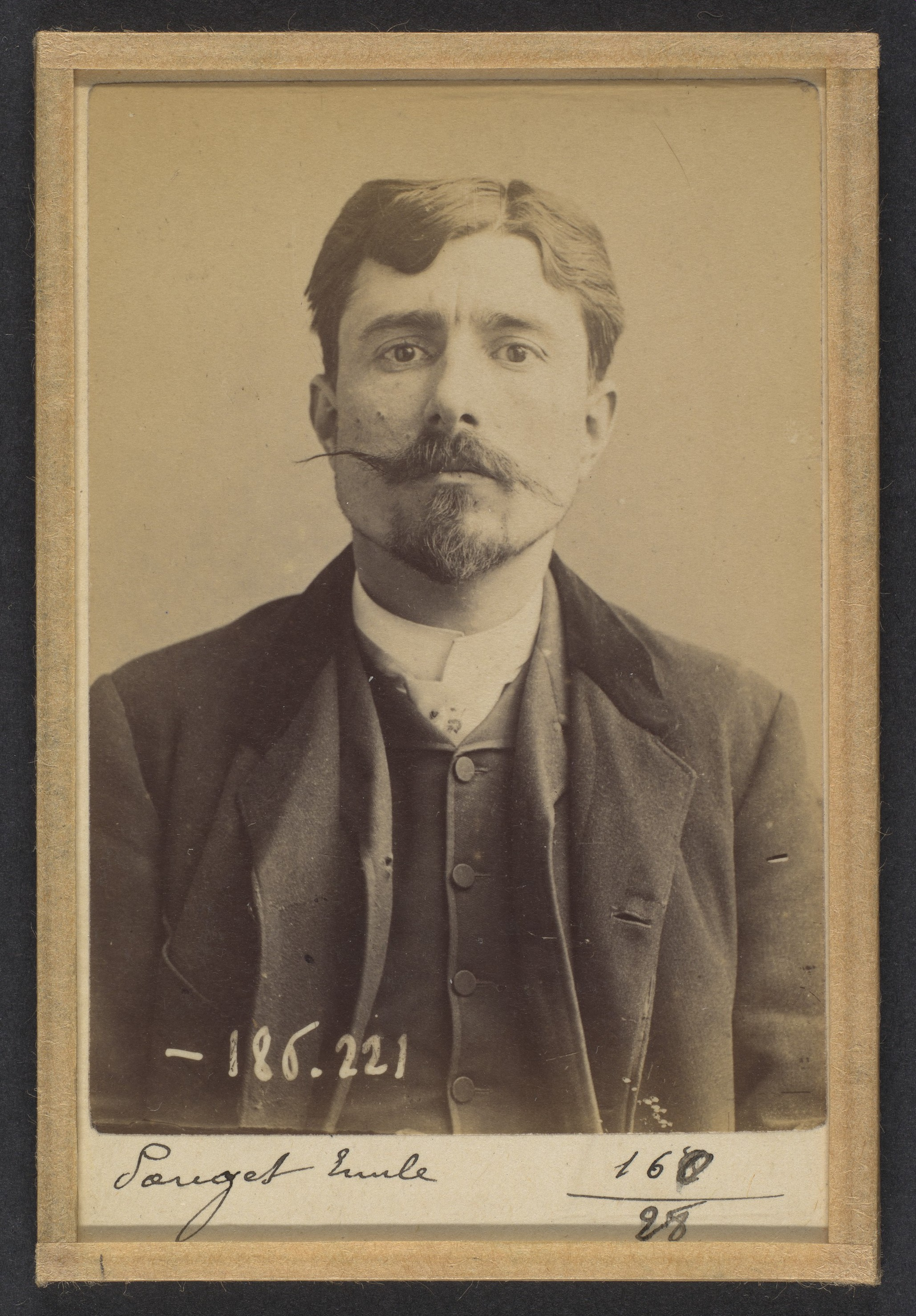
Émile Pouget

The United Kingdom quickly became the last haven for political refugees, in particular anarchists, who were all conflated with the few who had engaged in bombings. Already, the First International had been founded in London in 1871, where Karl Marx had taken refuge nearly twenty years before. In the 1890s, the UK became a nest for anarchist colonies expelled from the continent, in particular between 1892 and 1895, which marked the height of the repression, with the "Trial of the Thirty" taking place in 1894. Louise Michel, a.k.a. "the Red Virgin", Émile Pouget and Charles Malato were the most famous of the many anonymous anarchists, deserters or simple criminals who had fled France and other European countries. Many of them returned to France after President Félix Faure's amnesty in February 1895. A few hundred persons related to the anarchist movement would however remain in the UK between 1880 and 1914. The right of asylum was a British tradition since the Reformation in the 16th century. However, it would progressively be eroded, and the French immigrants were met with hostility. Several hate campaigns would be issued in the British press in the 1890s against these French exiles, relayed by riots and a "restrictionist" party which advocated the end of liberality concerning freedom of movement, and hostility towards French and international activists.

=== 1895–1914 ===
Le Libertaire, a newspaper created by Sébastien Faure, one of the leading supporters of Alfred Dreyfus, and Louise Michel, alias "The Red Virgin", published its first issue on November 16, 1895. The Confédération générale du travail (CGT) trade-union was created in the same year, from the fusion of the various "Bourses du Travail" (Fernand Pelloutier), the unions and the industries' federations. Dominated by anarcho-syndicalists, the CGT adopted the Charte d'Amiens in 1906, a year after the unification of the other socialist tendencies in the SFIO party (French Section of the Second International) led by Jean Jaurès and Jules Guesde.

Only eight French delegates attended the International Anarchist Congress of Amsterdam in August 1907. According to historian Jean Maitron, the anarchist movement in France was divided into those who rejected the sole idea of organisation, and were therefore opposed to the very idea of an international organisation, and those who put all their hopes in syndicalism, and thus "were occupied elsewhere". Only eight French anarchists assisted the Congress, among whom Benoît Broutchoux, Pierre Monatte and René de Marmande.

A few tentatives of organisation followed the Congress, but all were short-lived. In the industrial North, anarchists from Lille, Armentières, Denains, Lens, Roubaix and Tourcoing decided to call for a Congress in December 1907, and agreed upon the creation of a newspaper, Le Combat, which editorial board was to act as the informal bureau of an officially non-existent federation. Another federation was created in the Seine and the Seine-et-Oise in June 1908.

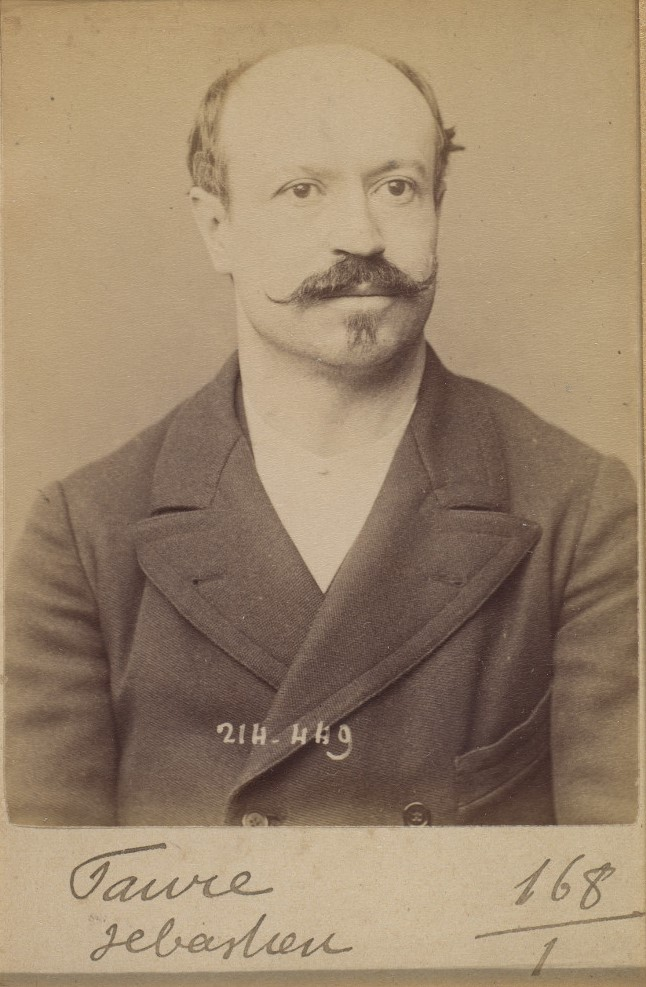
Sébastien Faure

However, at the approach of the 1910 legislative election, an Anti-Parliamentary Committee was set up and, instead of dissolving itself afterwards, became permanent under the name of Alliance communiste anarchiste (Communist Anarchist Alliance). The new organisation excluded any permanent members. Although this new group also faced opposition from certain anarchists (including Jean Grave), it was quickly replaced by a new organization, the Fédération communiste (Communist Federation).

The Communist Federation was founded in June 1911 with 400 members, all from the Parisian region. It quickly took the name of Fédération anarcho-communiste (Anarcho-Communist Federation), choosing Louis Lecoin as secretary. The Fédération communiste révolutionnaire anarchiste, headed by Sébastien Faure, succeeded to the FCA in August 1913.

The French anarchist milieu also included many individualists. They centered around publications such as L'Anarchie and L'En-Dehors. The main French individualist anarchist theorists were Émile Armand and Han Ryner who also were influential in the Iberian Peninsula. Other important individualist activists included Albert Libertad, André Lorulot, Victor Serge, Zo d'Axa and Rirette Maîtrejean. Influenced by Max Stirner's egoism and the criminal/political exploits of Clément Duval and Marius Jacob, France became the birthplace of illegalism, a controversial anarchist ideology that openly embraced criminality.

Relations between individualist and communist anarchists remained poor throughout the pre-war years. Following the 1913 trial of the infamous Bonnot Gang, the FCA condemned individualism as bourgeois and more in keeping with capitalism than communism. An article believed to have been written by Peter Kropotkin, in the British anarchist paper Freedom, argued that "Simple-minded young comrades were often led away by the illegalists' apparent anarchist logic; outsiders simply felt disgusted with anarchist ideas and definitely stopped their ears to any propaganda."

After the assassination of anti-militarist socialist leader Jean Jaurès a few days before the beginning of World War I, and the subsequent rallying of the Second International and the workers' movement to the war, even some anarchists supported the Sacred Union (Union Sacrée) government. Jean Grave, Peter Kropotkin and others published the Manifesto of the Sixteen supporting the Triple Entente against Germany. A clandestine issue of the Libertaire was published on June 15, 1917.

==== French individualist anarchism ====
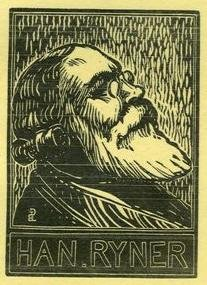
Han Ryner

From the legacy of Proudhon and Stirner there emerged a strong tradition of French individualist anarchism. An early important individualist anarchist was Anselme Bellegarrigue. He participated in the French Revolution of 1848, was author and editor of 'Anarchie, Journal de l'Ordre and Au fait ! Au fait ! Interprétation de l'idée démocratique' and wrote the important early Anarchist Manifesto in 1850. Catalan historian of individualist anarchism Xavier Diez reports that during his travels in the United States "he at least contacted (Henry David) Thoreau and, probably (Josiah) Warren."Autonomie Individuelle was an individualist anarchist publication that ran from 1887 to 1888. It was edited by Jean-Baptiste Louiche, Charles Schæffer and Georges Deherme.

Later, this tradition continued with such intellectuals as Albert Libertad, André Lorulot, Émile Armand, Victor Serge, Zo d'Axa and Rirette Maîtrejean, who developed theory in the main individualist anarchist journal in France, L'Anarchie in 1905. Outside this journal, Han Ryner wrote Petit Manuel individualiste (1903). Later appeared the journal L'En-Dehors created by Zo d'Axa in 1891.

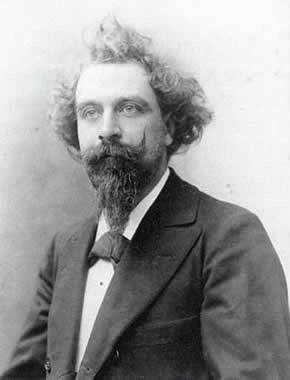
Zo d'Axa

French individualist circles had a strong sense of personal libertarianism and experimentation. Naturism and free love contents started to have an influence in individualist anarchist circles and from there it expanded to the rest of anarchism also appearing in Spanish individualist anarchist groups. "Along with feverish activity against the social order, (Albert) Libertad was usually also organizing feasts, dances and country excursions, in consequence of his vision of anarchism as the "joy of living" and not as militant sacrifice and death instinct, seeking to reconcile the requirements of the individual (in his need for autonomy) with the need to destroy authoritarian society."

Anarchist naturism was promoted by Henri Zisly, Émile Gravelle and Georges Butaud. Butaud was an individualist "partisan of the milieux libres, publisher of "Flambeau" ("an enemy of authority") in 1901 in Vienna. Most of his energies were devoted to creating anarchist colonies (communautés expérimentales) in which he participated in several.

"In this sense, the theoretical positions and the vital experiences of french individualism are deeply iconoclastic and scandalous, even within libertarian circles. The call of nudist naturism, the strong defence of birth control methods, the idea of "unions of egoists" with the sole justification of sexual practices, that will try to put in practice, not without difficulties, will establish a way of thought and action, and will result in sympathy within some, and a strong rejection within others."

==== Illegalism ====
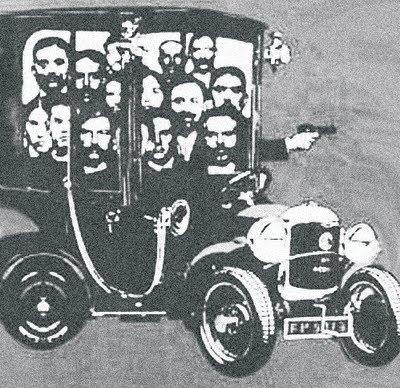
Caricature of the Bonnot gang

Illegalism is an anarchist philosophy that developed primarily in France, Italy, Belgium, and Switzerland during the early 1900s as an outgrowth of Stirner's individualist anarchism. Illegalists usually did not seek moral basis for their actions, recognizing only the reality of "might" rather than "right"; for the most part, illegal acts were done simply to satisfy personal desires, not for some greater ideal, although some committed crimes as a form of Propaganda of the deed. The illegalists embraced direct action and propaganda by the deed.

Influenced by theorist Max Stirner's egoism as well as Proudhon (his view that Property is theft!), Clément Duval and Marius Jacob proposed the theory of la reprise individuelle (Eng: individual reclamation) which justified robbery on the rich and personal direct action against exploiters and the system.,

Illegalism first rose to prominence among a generation of Europeans inspired by the unrest of the 1890s, during which Ravachol, Émile Henry, Auguste Vaillant, and Caserio committed daring crimes in the name of anarchism, in what is known as propaganda of the deed. France's Bonnot Gang was the most famous group to embrace illegalism.

=== From World War I to World War II ===
After the war, the CGT became more reformist, and anarchists progressively drifted out. Formerly dominated by the anarcho-syndicalists, the CGT split into a non-communist section and a communist Confédération générale du travail unitaire (CGTU) after the 1920 Tours Congress which marked the creation of the French Communist Party (PCF). A new weekly series of the Libertaire was edited, and the anarchists announced the imminent creation of an Anarchist Federation. A Union Anarchiste (UA) group was constituted in November 1919 against the Bolsheviks, and the first daily issue of the Libertaire got out on December 4, 1923.

Russian exiles, among them Nestor Makhno and Piotr Arshinov, founded in Paris the review Delo truda (Дело труда, The Cause of Labour) in 1925. Makhno co-wrote and co-published The Organizational Platform of the Libertarian Communists, which put forward ideas on how anarchists should organize based on the experiences of revolutionary Ukraine and the defeat at the hand of the Bolsheviks. The document was initially rejected by most anarchists, but today has a wide following. It remains controversial to this day, some (including, at the time of publication, Volin and Malatesta) viewing its implications as too rigid and hierarchical. Platformism, as Makhno's position came to be known, advocated ideological unity, tactical unity, collective action and discipline, and federalism. Five hundred people attended Makhno's 1934 funeral at the Père Lachaise Cemetery.

In June 1926, "The Organisational Platform Project for a General Union of Anarchists", best known under the name "Archinov's Platform", was launched. Volin responded by publishing a Synthesis project in his article "Le problème organisationnel et l'idée de synthèse" ("The Organisational Problem and the Idea of a Synthesis"). After the Orléans Congress (July 12–14, 1926), the Anarchist Union (UA) transformed itself into the Communist Anarchist Union (UAC, Union anarchiste communiste). The gap widened between proponents of Platformism and those who followed Volin's synthesis anarchism.

The Congress of the Fédération autonome du Bâtiment (November 13–14, 1926) in Lyon, created the CGT-SR (Confédération Générale du Travail-Syndicaliste Révolutionnaire) with help from members of the Spanish Confederación Nacional del Trabajo (CNT), which prompted the CGT's revolutionary syndicalists to join it. Julien Toublet became the new trade-union's secretary. Le Libertaire became again a weekly newspaper in 1926.

At the Orléans Congress of October 31 and November 1, 1927, the UAC became Platformist. The minority of those who followed Volin split and create the Association des fédéralistes anarchistes (AFA) which diffused the Trait d'union libertaire then La Voix Libertaire. Some Synthesists later rejoined the UAC (in 1930), which took the initiative of a Congress in 1934 to unite the anarchist movement on the basis of anti-fascism. The Congress took place on 20 and 21 May 1934, following the February 6, 1934, far right riots in Paris. All of the left-wing feared a fascist coup d'état, and the anarchists were at the spearhead of the anti-fascist movement. The AFA dissolved itself the same year, and joined the new group, promptly renamed Union anarchiste. However, a Fédération communiste libertaire later created itself after a new split in the UA.

Anarchists then participated in the general strikes during the Popular Front (1936–1938) which led to the Matignon Accords (40 hours week, etc.) Headed by Léon Blum, the Popular Front did not intervene in the Spanish Civil War, because of the Radicals' presence in the government. Thus, Blum blocked the Brigades from crossing the borders and sent ambulances to the Spanish Republicans, while Adolf Hitler and Benito Mussolini were sending men and weapons to Francisco Franco. In the same way, Blum refused to boycott the 1936 Summer Olympics in Berlin, and to support the People's Olympiad in Barcelona. Some anarchists became members of International Antifascist Solidarity (Solidarité internationale antifasciste), which helped volunteers illegally cross the border, while others went to Spain and joined the Durruti Column's French-speaking contingent, The Sébastien Faure Century. A Fédération anarchiste de langue française (FAF) developed from a split in the UA, and denounce the collusion between the French anarchists with the Popular Front, as well as criticizing the CNT–FAI's participation to the Republican government in Spain. The FAF edited Terre libre, in which Volin collaborated. Before World War II, there are two organizations, the Union anarchiste (UA), which had as its newspaper Le Libertaire, and the Fédération anarchiste française (FAF) which had the Terre libre newspaper. However, to the contrary of the French Communist Party (PCF) which had organized a clandestine network before the war – Édouard Daladier's government even had made it illegal after the Molotov–Ribbentrop Pact – the anarchist groups lacked any clandestine infrastructure in 1940. Hence, as all other parties apart from the PCF, they quickly became completely disorganized during and after the Battle of France.

=== Under Vichy ===
After Operation Barbarossa and the Allies' landing in North Africa, Marshal Philippe Pétain, head of the new "French State" (Vichy regime) which had replaced the French Third Republic, saw "the bad wind approaching." ("le mauvais vent s'approcher"). The Resistance began to start organizing itself in 1942–1943. Meanwhile, the French police, under the orders of René Bousquet and his second in command, Jean Leguay, systematically added to the list of targets designed by the Gestapo (communists, freemasons, Jews, and anarchists.)

On 19 July 1943, a clandestine meeting of anarchist activists took place in Toulouse; they spoke of the Fédération internationale syndicaliste révolutionnaire. On January 15, 1944, the new Fédération Anarchiste decided on a charter approved in Agen on October 29–30, 1944. Decision was taken to publish clandestinely Le Libertaire as to maintain relations; its first issue was published in December 1944. After the Liberation, the newspaper again became a bi-weekly, and on October 6–7, 1945, the Assises du mouvement libertaire were held.

=== The Fourth Republic (1945–1958) ===
The Fédération Anarchiste (FA) was founded in Paris on December 2, 1945, and elected Georges Fontenis as its first secretary the next year. It was composed of a majority of activists from the former FA (which supported Volin's Synthesis) and some members of the former Union anarchiste, which supported the CNT-FAI support to the Republican government during the Spanish Civil War, as well as some young Resistants. A youth organization of the FA (the Jeunesses libertaires) was also created. Apart from some individualist anarchists grouped behind Émile Armand, who published L'Unique and L'EnDehors, and some pacifists (Louvet and Maille who published A contre-courant), the French anarchists were thus united in the FA. Furthermore, a confederate structure was created to coordinate publications with Louvet and Ce qu'il faut dire newspaper, the anarcho-syndicalist minority of the reunited CGT (gathered into the Fédération syndicaliste française (FSF), they represented the 'Action syndicaliste' current inside the CGT), and Le Libertaire newspaper. The FSF finally transformed itself into the actual Confédération nationale du travail (CNT) on 6 December 1946, adopting the Paris charter and publishing Le Combat Syndicaliste.

The Confédération nationale du travail (CNT, or National Confederation of Labour) was founded in 1946 by Spanish anarcho-syndicalists in exile with former members of the CGT-SR.

The anarchists started the 1947 insurrectionary strikes at the Renault factories, crushed by Interior Minister socialist Jules Moch, whom created for the occasion the Compagnies Républicaines de Sécurité (CRS) riot-police. Because of the CNT's inner divisions, some FA activists decided to participate to the creation of the reformist CGT-FO, issued from a split within the communist dominated CGT. The FA participated to the International Anarchist Congress of Puteaux in 1949, which gathered structured organizations as well as autonomous groups and individuals (from Germany, USA, Bolivia, Cuba, Argentina, Peru and elsewhere). Some communist anarchists organized themselves early in 1950 in a fraction, named Organisation pensée bataille (OPB) which had as aim to impose a single political stance and centralize the organization.

The GAAP (Groupes anarchistes d'action prolétarienne) were created on February 24–25, 1951, in Italy by former members of the FAI excluded at the congress of Ancône. The same year, the FA decides, on a proposition from the Louise Michel group animated by Maurice Joyeux, to substitute individual vote to the group vote. The adopted positions gain federalist status, but are not imposed to individuals. Individualists opposed to this motion failed to block it. "Haute fréquence", a surrealist manifest was published in Le Libertaire on July 6, 1951. Some surrealists started working with the FA. Furthermore, the Mouvement indépendant des auberges de jeunesse (MIAJ, Independent Movement of Youth Hostels) was created at the end of 1951.

In 1950 a clandestine group formed within the FA called Organisation Pensée Bataille (OPB) led by Georges Fontenis. The OPB pushed for a move which saw the FA change its name into the Fédération communiste libertaire (FCL) after the 1953 Congress in Paris, while an article in Le Libertaire indicated the end of the cooperation with the French Surrealist Group led by André Breton. The FCL regrouped between 130 and 160 activists. The new decision-making process was founded on unanimity: each person has a right of veto on the orientations of the federation. The FCL published the same year the Manifeste du communisme libertaire. The FCL published its 'workers' program' in 1954, which was heavily inspired by the CGT's revendications. The Libertarian Communist International (ICL), which groups the Italian GAAP, the Spanish Ruta and the North African Libertarian Movement (MLNA), was founded to replace the Anarchist International, deemed too reformist. The first issue of the monthly Monde libertaire, the news organ of the FA which would be published until 1977, came out in October 1954.

Several groups quit the FCL in December 1955, disagreeing with the decision to present "revolutionary candidates" to the legislative elections. On August 15–20, 1954, the Ve intercontinental plenum of the CNT took place. A group called Entente anarchiste appeared which was formed of militants who didn't like the new ideological orientation that the OPB was giving the FCL seeing it was authoritarian and almost marxist. The FCL lasted until 1956 just after it participated in state legislative elections with 10 candidates. This move alienated some members of the FCL and thus produced the end of the organization.

A group of militants who didn't agree with the FA turning into FCL reorganized a new Federation Anarchiste which was established in December 1953. This included those who formed L'Entente anarchiste who joined the new FA and then dissolved L'Entente. The new base principles of the FA were written by the individualist anarchist Charles-Auguste Bontemps and the non-platformist anarcho-communist Maurice Joyeux which established an organization with a plurality of tendencies and autonomy of group organized around synthesist principles. According to historian Cédric Guérin, "the unconditional rejection of Marxism became from that moment onwards an identity element of the new Federation Anarchiste" and this was motivated in a big part after the previous conflict with Fontenis and his OPB. Also it was decided to establish within the organization a Committee of Relations composed of a General Secretary, a Secretary of Internal Relations, a Secretary of External Relations a Committee of Redaction of Le Monde Libertaire and a Committee of Administration. In 1955 a Commission on Syndicalist Relations was established within the FA as proposed by anarcho-syndicalist members.

Regrouping behind Robert and Beaulaton, some activists of the former Entente anarchiste quit the FA and created on November 25, 1956, in Bruxelles the AOA (Alliance ouvrière anarchiste), which edited L'Anarchie and would drift to the far-right during the Algerian war.

The French Surrealist group led by André Breton now openly embraced anarchism and collaborated in the Fédération Anarchiste. In 1952 Breton wrote "It was in the black mirror of anarchism that surrealism first recognised itself." "Breton was consistent in his support for the francophone Anarchist Federation and he continued to offer his solidarity after the Platformists around Fontenis transformed the Fédération Anarchiste into the Federation Communiste Libertaire. He was one of the few intellectuals who continued to offer his support to the FCL during the Algerian war when the FCL suffered severe repression and was forced underground. He sheltered Fontenis whilst he was in hiding. He refused to take sides on the splits in the French anarchist movement and both he and Peret expressed solidarity as well with the new Fédération Anarchiste set up by the synthesist anarchists and worked in the Antifascist Committees of the 60s alongside the Fédération Anarchiste."

=== The Fifth Republic (1958) and May 1968 ===
Many leaders of the Mouvement du 22 Mars, the March 1968 decentralized student protest in Nanterre, came from small anarchist groups. The anarchists rejected the Fédération anarchiste (FA), which they described as dogmatic, and instead mixed with other revolutionaries, such as Trotskyites and other militants. Anarchism was in a lull at the time of the radical May 1968 events. It was minimally present in the events. Even the Situationists, who held similar positions, bristled at being publicly grouped with the anarchists. Daniel Guérin's Anarchism: From Theory to Practice was popular during the May 1968 events.

Logo of Fédération anarchiste

Anarchism influenced but did not capitalize on the 1968 student committees and workplace occupations. Anarchist groups active during the May 1968 events in France included the FA, Mouvement communiste libertaire (MCL), Union fédérale des anarchistes, Alliance ouvrière anarchiste, Union des groupes anarchistes communistes (UGAC), Noir et Rouge, Confédération nationale du travail, Union anarcho-syndicaliste, Organisation révolutionnaire anarchiste (ORA), Cahiers socialistes libertaires, À contre-courant, La Révolution prolétarienne, and the publications close to Émile Armand. The ORA grew within the FA and became independent in 1971. It formed over 100 groups in the early 1970s and split into Organisation Communiste Libertaire and the Union des Travailleurs Communistes Libertaires. The latter became Alternative Libertaire.

In the seventies the FA evolved into a joining of the principles of both synthesis anarchism and platformism. Today the FA is constituted of about one hundred groups around the country.

The contemporary movement is divided into multiple groups. The social anarchists of FA run a radio station, a weekly periodical, and a bookshop network. Alternative Libertaire is a smaller organization.

== List of French libertarian organisations ==
- EnDehors (individualist anarchist, 1891)
- Bonnot Gang (illegalist, 1911)
- Fédération Anarchiste (synthesist, 1945, member of International of Anarchist Federations)
- L'Anarchie (individualist anarchist, 1905)
- CNT-F (revolutionary-syndicalist, 1945)
- CNT-AIT (anarcho-syndicalist, 1945) http://cnt-ait.info English section of the web site :
- Libertarian Communist Organization (France) (OCL, platformist, 1976)
- Union of Libertarian Communist Workers (UTCL, anarcho-syndicalist, 1978)
- Action directe (1979)
- Anarchists Union (1979)
- CLODO (1980)
- No Pasaran (SCALP, antifascist,1984)
- Alternative libertaire (1991, platformist member of the Anarkismo)
- Libertarian Communist Union (platformist, 2019)

== See also ==
- À Nous la Liberté
- Anarchism in Belgium
- Anarchism in Monaco
- Anarchism in Switzerland
- Communism in France
- French Left
- List of anarchist movements by region
- The Coming Insurrection, an eclectic amalgamation of post-situationist and anarcho-communist ideas attributed to the Tarnac Nine

== Bibliography ==
- Berry, Dave (2018). "Anarchism and 1968". In Levy, Carl; Adams, Matthew S. (eds.). The Palgrave Handbook of Anarchism. Palgrave Macmillan. pp. 449–470. ISBN 978-3-319-75619-6.
- Berry, David. A history of the French anarchist movement: 1917 to 1945. Greenwood Press. 2002. new edition AK Press. 2009.
- Carr, Reg. Anarchism in France: The Case of Octave Mirbeau. Montreal. 1977.
- Daniel, Evan Matthew; Heath, Nick (2009). "Anarchism, France". The International Encyclopedia of Revolution and Protest. John Wiley & Sons, Ltd. pp. 1–4. doi:10.1002/9781405198073.wbierp0054. ISBN 978-1-4051-9807-3.
- Frémion, Yves. L'anarchiste: L'affaire Léauthier. Paris. 1999.
- Maitron, Jean. Histoire du mouvement anarchiste en France (1880–1914) (first ed., SUDEL, Paris, 1951, 744 p.; Reedition in two volumes by François Maspero, Paris, 1975, and reedition Gallimard)
- Merriman, John. Dynamite Club: How a Bombing in Fin-de-Siècle Paris Ignited the Age of Modern Terror. Houghton Mifflin Harcourt. 2009.
- Nataf, André. La vie quotidienne des anarchistes en France, 1880–1910. Paris, 1986.
- Patsouras, Louis. The Anarchism of Jean Grave. Montreal. 2003.
- Porter, David (2011). Eyes to the South: French Anarchists & Algeria. AK Press. ISBN 978-1-84935-076-1.
- Shaya, Gregory. "How to Make an Anarchist-Terrorist: An Essay on the Political Imaginary in Fin de Siècle France", Journal of Social History 44 (2010). online
- Sonn, Richard D. Anarchism and Cultural Politics in Fin-de-Siècle France. University of Nebraska Press. 1989.
- Sonn, Richard D. Sex, Violence, and the Avant-Garde: Anarchism in Interwar France. Penn State Press. 2010.
- Varias, Alexander. Paris and the Anarchists. New York. 1996.
