= Sex, Violence, and the Avant-Garde =

2010 book by Richard D. Sonn

- Author: Richard D. Sonn
- Subject: Anarchism in France
- Publisher: Penn State University Press
- Publication date: 2010
- Pages: 259
- ISBN: 978-0-271-03663-2

Sex, Violence, and the Avant-Garde: Anarchism in Interwar France is a 2010 history book by Richard D. Sonn.
