= Sainte-Pélagie Prison =

Prison in Paris used between 1790–1899

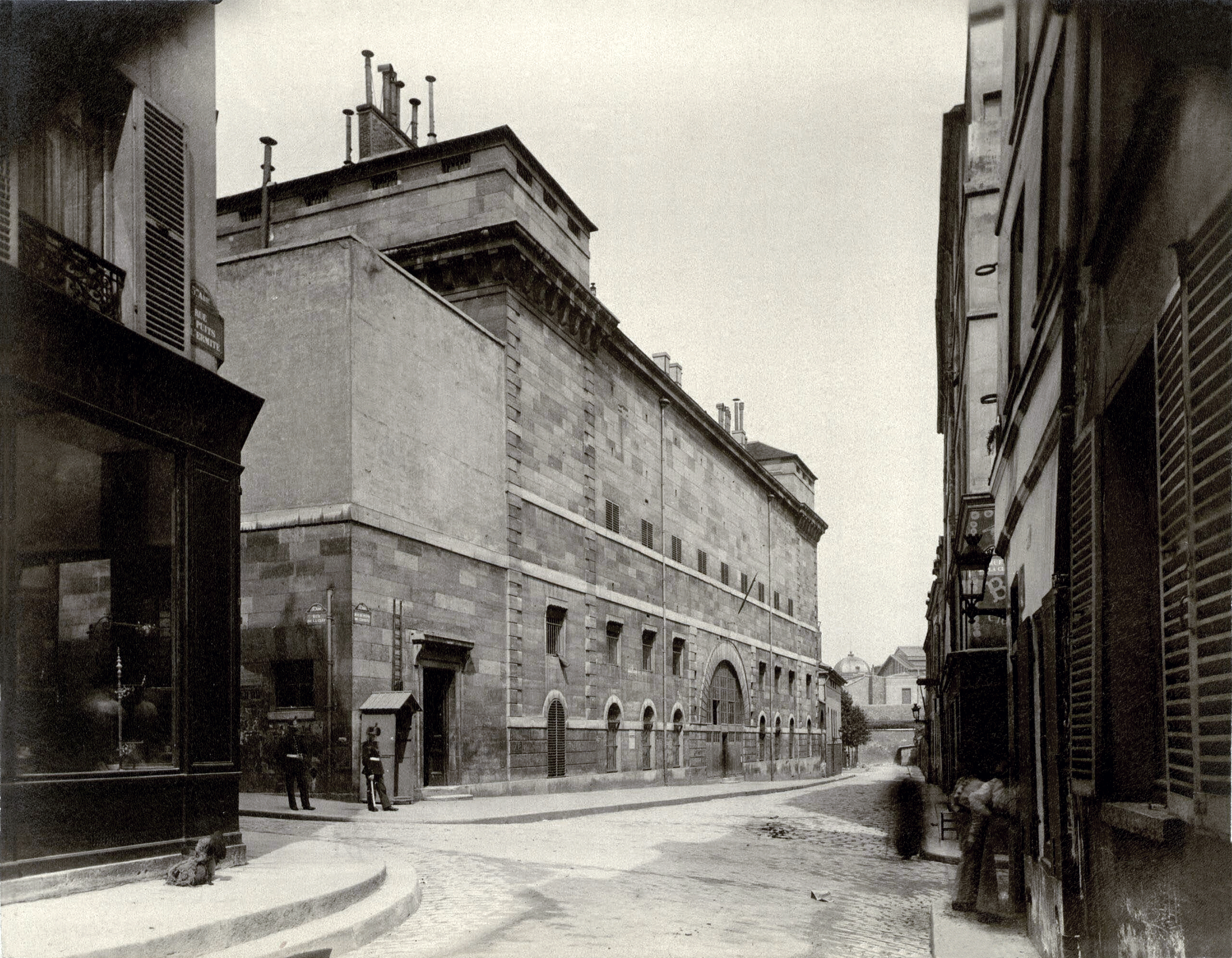
- By Eugène Atget, Sainte-Pélagie prison in 1898, destroyed in May 1899.

- Sainte-Pélagie location in Paris
- Location: 5th arrondissement of Paris; 48.842581°N 2.352720°E
- Status: Demolished
- Opened: 1790
- Closed: May 1899

Notable prisoners
- Madame Roland; Grace Elliott; Évariste Galois; Gustave Courbet; Marquis de Sade; Pierre-Jean de Béranger; James Swan; Zo d'Axa

Sainte-Pélagie was a prison in Paris, in active use from 1790 to 1899. It was founded earlier than that, however, in 1662, as place for "repentant girls" and later "debauched women and girls." The former Parisian prison was located between the current group of buildings bearing No. 56 Rue de la Clef with Rue du Puits-de-l'Ermite in the 5th arrondissement of Paris at the old Place Sainte-Pélagie.

The penal structure held many noted prisoners during the French Revolution, with Madame Roland, Grace Dalrymple Elliott and Marie-Louise O'Murphy being among the known prisoners. After the revolution, the Marquis de Sade was imprisoned here, as was the young mathematician Évariste Galois. During the July Monarchy, the "April insurgees" were also detained there, and some managed to escape through a tunnel. The painter Gustave Courbet was also imprisoned here for his activities in the Paris Commune. He painted a self-portrait titled, Gustave Courbet: Self-Portrait at Sainte-Pélagie.

== See also ==
- Bagne of Toulon
- Grand Châtelet
- La Force Prison
- Timeline of the French Revolution
