= Zo d'Axa =

French journalist and anarchist (1864–1930)

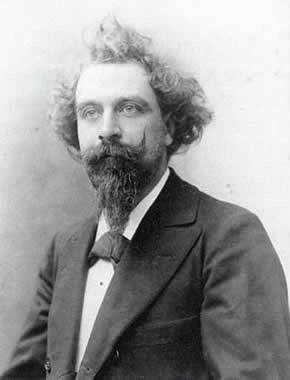
- Born: Alphonse Gallaud de la Pérouse; 28 May 1864; Paris, France
- Died: 30 August 1930 (aged 66); Marseille, France
- Occupations: Adventurer; journalist
- Known for: L'Endehors; La Feuille

Alphonse Gallaud de la Pérouse (28 May 1864 – 30 August 1930), better known as Zo d'Axa (French pronunciation: [zo daksa]), was a French adventurer, anti-militarist, satirist, and journalist. He founded two highly influential French magazines, L'Endehors and La Feuille. A descendant of the famous French navigator Jean-François de Galaup, comte de Lapérouse, he was one of the most prominent French individualist anarchists at the turn of the 20th century.

== Life ==
Alphonse Gallaud de la Pérouse was born on 28 May 1864 in Paris, France. He was a cavalryman but deserted to Belgium and was exiled to Italy in 1889. There he ran an ultra-Catholic newspaper and seduced the native womenfolk. According to popular myth, d'Axa during his time in Italy was hesitating between becoming an anarchist or a religious missionary when he was accused (wrongfully, he contended) of insulting the Empress of Germany, and was made an anarchist by the subsequent legal proceedings against him. He spent the next few years being pursued from one country to the next by the police, before taking advantage of the general amnesty and returning to France.

At this point, having led (in the words of historian Jules Bertaut) "a most disreputable life", and being an agitator by temperament, d'Axa gravitated towards the anarchist movement. He founded the famous anarchist newspaper L'EnDehors in May 1891 in which numerous contributors such as Jean Grave, Louise Michel, Sébastien Faure, Octave Mirbeau, Tristan Bernard and Émile Verhaeren developed libertarian ideas. D'Axa and L'EnDehors rapidly became the target of the authorities after attacks by Ravachol and d'Axa was arrested, charged with 'association to commit crimes' and kept in Mazas Prison. After his release he wrote numerous pamphlets and met Camille Pissarro and James Whistler in London. He was again arrested in Jaffa, and transferred to Sainte-Pélagie Prison, Paris, where he spent 18 months before his release in july 1894. He died by suicide on 30 August 1930, burning most of his papers the previous night.

== Philosophy ==
An individualist and aesthete, d'Axa justified the use of violence as an anarchist, seeing propaganda of the deed as akin to works of art. Anarchists, he wrote, "had no need to hope for distant better futures, they know a sure means of plucking the joy immediately: destroy passionately!" "It is simple enough.", d'Axa proclaimed of his contemporaries, "If our extraordinary flights (nos fugues inattendues) throw people out a little, the reason is that we speak of everyday things as the primitive barbarian would, were he brought across them." D'Axa was a bohemian who "exulted in his outsider status", and praised the anti-capitalist lifestyle of itinerant anarchist bandit precursors of the French illegalists. He expressed contempt for the masses and hatred for their rulers. He was an important anarchist interpreter of the philosophy of individualist anarchist Max Stirner, defender of Alfred Dreyfus during the Dreyfus affair and opponent of prisons and penitentiaries.

== Publications ==
- From Mazas to Jerusalem (De Mazas à Jérusalem) (1895). Illustrations by Lucien Pissarro, Steinlen and Félix Vallotton. OCLC 459248131
- L'Endehors (1891–1893) ISBN 978-1-909053-53-3
- La Feuille (1897–1899)

== See also ==
- Anarchism in France
- Bonnot Gang
- Individualist anarchism in Europe
