= L'Unique =

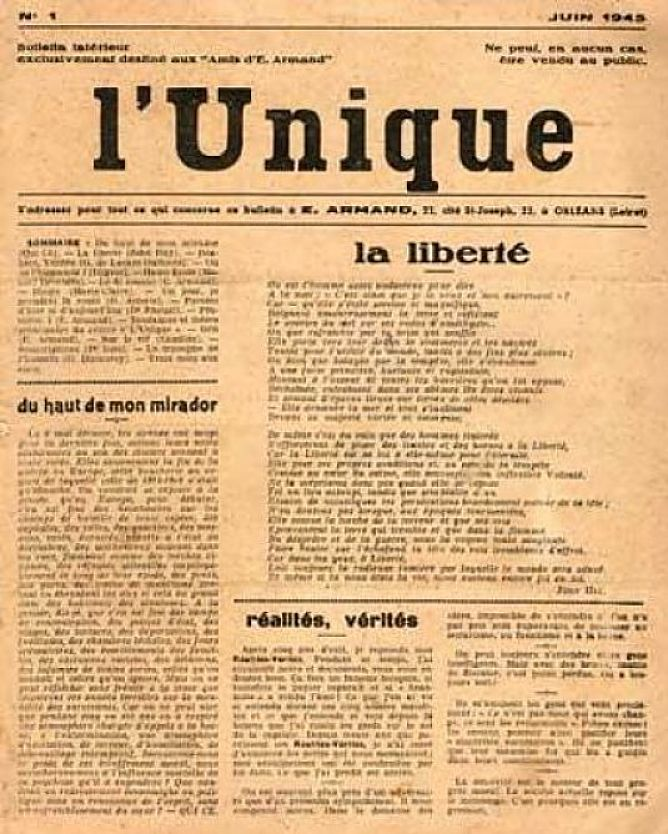
L'Unique

L'Unique was a French individualist anarchist publication edited by Émile Armand. It ran from 1945 to 1956 and reached 110 numbers. Other writers include Gérard de Lacaze-Duthiers, Manuel Devaldès, Lucy Sterne, Thérèse Gaucher and others. Louis Moreau provided illustrations. L'Unique was an eclectic publication with a focus on philosophy and ethics.

== See also ==
- Individualist anarchism in Europe
