= Émile Armand =

French individualist anarchist (1872–1962)

E. Armand
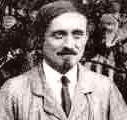
- Born: Ernest-Lucien Juin; 26 March 1872; Paris, France
- Died: 19 February 1962 (aged 89); Rouen, France

Philosophical work
- Era: 20th-century philosophy
- Region: Western philosophy
- School: Individualist anarchism
- Main interests: The individual, love, sex, ethics, free love
- Notable ideas: Camaraderie amoureuse, millieux libres

E. Armand (March 26, 1872 – February 19, 1962), pseudonym of Ernest-Lucien Juin, was an influential French individualist anarchist at the beginning of the 20th century and also a dedicated free love/polyamory, intentional community, and pacifist/antimilitarist writer, propagandist and activist. He wrote for and edited the anarchist publications L'Ère nouvelle (1901–1911), L'Anarchie, L'En-Dehors (1922–1939) and L'Unique (1945–1953).

== Life and activism ==
Armand collaborated in anarchist and pacifist journals such as La Misère, L'Universel and Le Cri de révolte. In 1901, he established with Marie Kugel (his companion until 1906) the journal L'Ère nouvelle, which initially adhered to Christian anarchism.

In 1908 he published the book Qu'est-ce qu'un anarchiste. In 1911 he married Denise Rougeault who helped him financially and with this he was able to concentrate on his activism. From 1922 on he published the magazine L'En-Dehors which lasted around 17 years. At the same time he wrote Poésies composées en prison, l'Initiation individualiste anarchiste (1923) and La révolution sexuelle et la camaraderie amoureuse (1934). In 1931 he published "Ways of communal life without state and authority. Economic and sexual experiences through history" in which he presented intentional communities anarchist and non-anarchist from different times. In it he argued that these experiments were ways of resistance and propaganda by the deed of the possibility of living differently according to affinity groups will. In this way he revitalized utopian socialist thought and practice of thinkers such as Robert Owen and especially Charles Fourier with whom he could also connect with his viewpoints on free love and freedom of personal exploration.

By then, his thought had an important influence in the Spanish anarchist movements through the help of Spanish individualist anarchists activists such as José Elizalde (his main translator into Spanish) and his group "Sol y Vida" and the individualist anarchist press such as La Revista Blanca, Ética and Iniciales from Barcelona. Iniciales especially had a specific strong influence by Armand's thought. On the debate within anarchist circles he defended the Ido constructed language over Esperanto with the help of José Elizalde. He also maintained a fluid contact with important individualist anarchists of the time such as the American Benjamin Tucker and the French Han Ryner. He also contributed in a few articles in Sébastien Faure´s Anarchist Encyclopedia.

French individualist anarchists grouped behind Armand and published L'Unique during and after World War II. L'Unique went from 1945 to 1956 with a total of 110 numbers.

Armand was an atheist.

He died on 19 February 1963, in Rouen.

== Armand's individualist anarchism ==
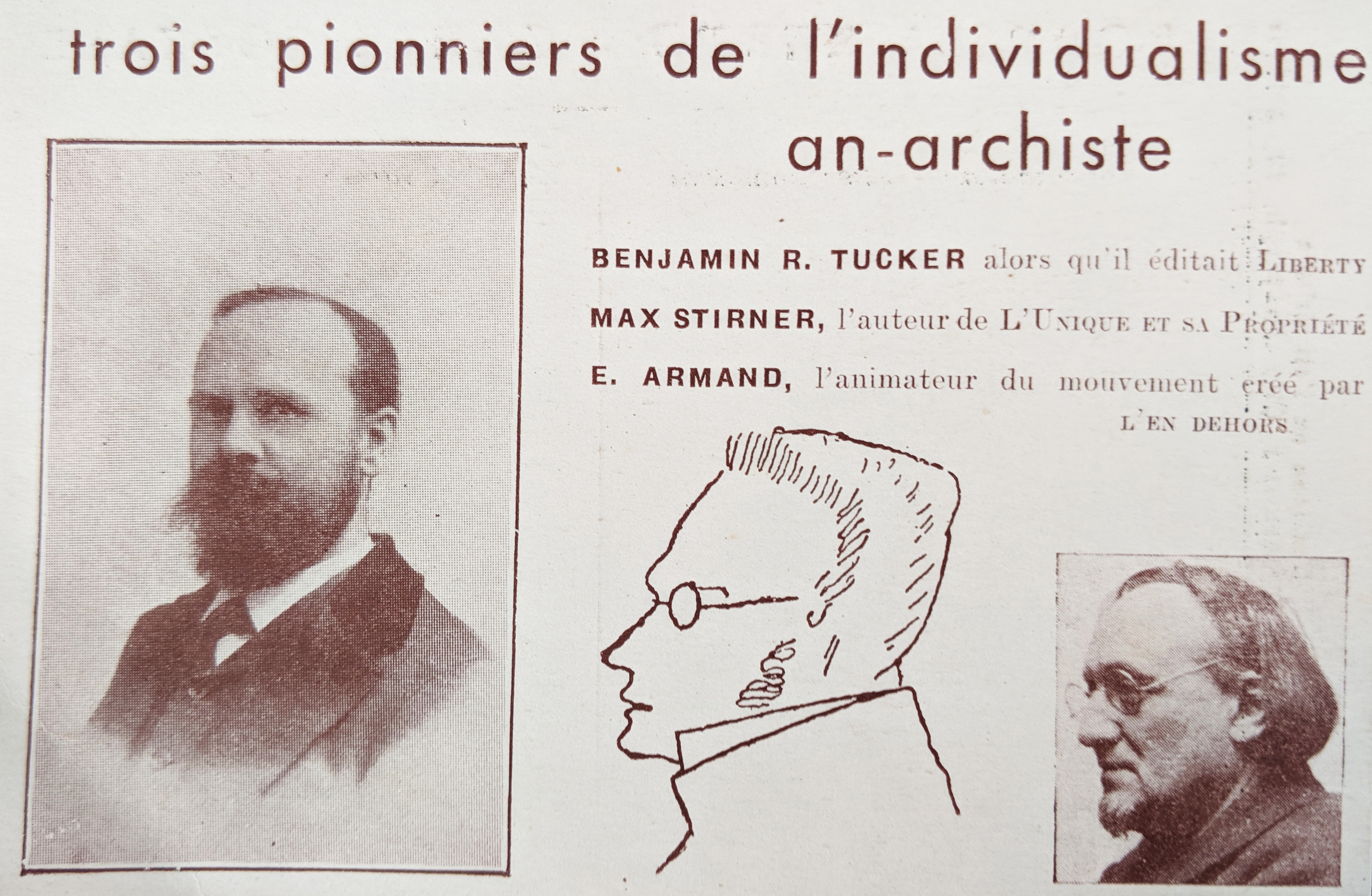
Tucker, Stirner, and Armand: "Three pioneers of individualist anarchism"

For Spanish historian Xavier Diez, the political philosophy of Émile Armand can be understood through the consideration of four main themes: his definition of individualism, the dynamics between the individual and society, individualist ethics, and the subject of association between individualists.

Armand liked to emphasize the difference that his individualist anarchism has with the social anarchist currents. As such, he rejected the usual call of anarcho-communism for revolution. He argued that waiting for revolution meant waiting for the masses to gain awareness and will and delaying the enjoyment of liberty until that event comes. Instead, he advocated living under one's own conditions in the present time, revolting against social conditioning in daily life and living with those with an affinity to oneself in accord to the values and desire they share. He says the individualist is "a presentist" and "he could not, without bad reasoning and illogic, think of sacrificing his being, or his having, to the coming of a state of things he will not immediately enjoy".

From the influence of Max Stirner he embraces egoistical denial of social conventions, dogmas and accords in order to live in accord to one's own ways and desires in daily life since he emphasized anarchism as a way of life and practice. In this way he manifests "So the anarchist individualist tends to reproduce himself, to perpetuate his spirit in other individuals who will share his views and who will make it possible for a state of affairs to be established from which authoritarianism has been banished. It is this desire, this will, not only to live, but also to reproduce oneself, which we shall call "activity" ".

His views on society can be summarized as follows:

The ruling classes, through the intermediary of the State, ensure that only their own views on culture, morality and economic conditions, are allowed to penetrate to the masses. They set up their own views in the form of civil dogmas, which no man may violate under pain of punishment, just as in former times, during the reign of the Church, there were severe penalties for daring to challenge religious dogmas. The State – the laic form of the Church – has replaced the Church which was the religious form of the State – but the aim of both has always been to form, not free beings, but true believers or perfect citizens. In other words slaves to dogma or law. The anarchist replies that when solidarity is imposed from without it is worthless; that when a contract is enforced there is no longer any question of rights or duties; that coercion releases him from the bonds which attach him to a so-called society whose executives he knows only in the guise of administrators, law-givers, judges and policemen; that he supports only the solidarity of his everyday relationships. Fictitious and imposed solidarity is worthless solidarity.

From an individualist perspective Armand sees that one better look for those with an affinity to oneself and freely associate with one another with the possibility of breaking or interrupting the association or encounter at any time one of the parts wants it. In this way he applies this rule to friendship, love, sexual encounters and economic transactions. He adheres to an ethics of reciprocity and sees the chances of one's self realization as enhanced by the association with others seeing this as the main reason for propaganda of one's own values. Armand's

"ideas about freedom in sexual matters come from Fourier's "theory of the four movements", which was as disdained by some "puritan" anarchists as Proudhon was. Fourier explains that humans have to follow the patterns of a markedly sexual universe which always moves in harmony, proposing a new organization of the amorous world in which everyone would be able to express their individuality in the plurality of encounters, which would permit all forms of love, encouraging every imaginable kind of associations."

A hedonistic individualism is advocated when he manifests that

"(Charles) Fourier saw it clearly when he launched his truly majestic expression of "the utilization of the passions". A reasonable being utilizes; only the senseless suppress and mutilate. "Utilize one's own passions" yes, but for whose benefit? For one's own benefit, to make one's self someone "more alive", that is, more open to the multiple sensations that life offers. The happiness of living! Life is beautiful for whoever goes beyond the borders of conventional existence, whoever evades the hell of industrialism and commercialism, whoever rejects the stink of the alleys and taverns. Life is beautiful for whoever constructs it without care for the restrictions of respectability, of the fear of "what they'll say" or of the gossips...Our individualism is not an individualism of the graveyard, an individualism of sadness and of shadow, an individualism of pain and suffering. Our individualism is a creator of happiness, in us and outside of us. We want to find happiness wherever it is possible, thanks to our potential as seekers, discoverers, realizers.".

For this a hedonistic logic is put forward and so Armand does not

"classify pleasures as superior or inferior, good or bad, useful or harmful, favorable or inconvenient. The ones that make me love life more are useful. The ones that make me hate it or depreciate it are harmful. Favorable are the enjoyments that make me feel like I'm living more fully, unfavorable those that contribute to the shrinking of my feeling of being alive. I feel myself to be a slave as long as I consent to others judging my passions. Not because I'm not really passionate, but because I want to flesh out my passions and impassion my flesh.".

=== Economics ===
In economics he says that the individualist anarchist "inwardly he remains refractory – fatally refractory – morally, intellectually, economically (The capitalist economy and the directed economy, the speculators and the fabricators of single are equally repugnant to him.)" He adheres to the following pluralistic logic as a form of individualist anarchist economics:

Here and there everything happening – here everyone receiving what they need, there each one getting whatever is needed according to their own capacity. Here, gift and barter – one product for another; there, exchange – product for representative value. Here, the producer is the owner of the product, there, the product is put to the possession of the collectivity.

== Free love activism and practice ==
Armand was an important propagandist of free love. He advocated free love, naturism and polyamory in what he termed la camaraderie amoureuse. Above all he advocated a pluralism in sex and love matters in which one could find "Here sexual union and family, there freedom or promiscuity". He wrote many propagandist articles on this subject such as "De la liberté sexuelle" (1907) where he advocated not only a vague free love but also multiple partners, which he called "plural love". In the individualist anarchist journal L'En-Dehors, he and others continued in this way. Armand seized this opportunity to outline his theses supporting revolutionary sexualism and camaraderie amoureuse that differed from the traditional views of the partisans of free love in several respects.

Later, Armand submitted that from an individualist perspective, nothing was reprehensible about making "love" even if one did not have very strong feelings for one's partner. "The camaraderie amoureuse thesis entails a free contract of association (that may be annulled without notice, following prior agreement) reached between anarchist individualists of different genders, adhering to the necessary standards of sexual hygiene, with a view toward protecting the other parties to the contract from certain risks of the amorous experience, such as rejection, rupture, exclusivism, possessiveness, unicity, coquetry, whims, indifference, flirtatiousness, disregard for others, and prostitution."

He also published Le Combat contre la jalousie et le sexualisme révolutionnaire (1926), followed over the years by Ce que nous entendons par liberté de l'amour (1928), La Camaraderie amoureuse ou "chiennerie sexuelle" (1930), and, finally, La Révolution sexuelle et la camaraderie amoureuse (1934), a book of nearly 350 pages comprising most of his writings on sexuality.

In a text from 1937, he mentioned among the individualist objectives the practice of forming voluntary associations for purely sexual purposes of heterosexual, homosexual, or bisexual nature or of a combination thereof. He also supported the right of individuals to change sex and stated his willingness to rehabilitate forbidden pleasures, non-conformist caresses (he was personally inclined toward voyeurism), as well as sodomy. This led him allocate more and more space to what he called "the sexual non-conformists", while excluding physical violence. His militancy also included translating texts from people such as Alexandra Kollontai and Wilhelm Reich and establishments of free love associations which tried to put into practice la camaraderie amoureuse through actual sexual experiences.

The prestige in the subject of free love of Armand within anarchist circles was such as to motivate the young Argentinian anarchist América Scarfó to ask Armand in a letter on advice as to how to deal with the relationship she had with notorious Italian anarchist Severino Di Giovanni. Di Giovanni was still married when they began the relationship. "The letter was published in L'En-Dehors" on 20 January 1929 under the title "'An Experience', together with the reply from E. Armand". Armand replied to Scarfó, "Comrade: My opinion matters little in this matter you send me about what you are doing. Are you or are you not intimately in accord with your personal conception of the anarchist life? If you are, then ignore the comments and insults of others and carry on following your own path. No one has the right to judge your way of conducting yourself, even if it were the case that your friend's wife be hostile to these relations. Every woman united to an anarchist (or vice versa), knows very well that she should not exercise on him, or accept from him, domination of any kind."

== Works ==
- L'idéal libertaire et sa réalisation., 1904.
- De la liberté sexuelle, 1907.
- Mon athéisme, 1908.
- Qu'est-ce qu'un anarchiste ? Thèses et opinions, Paris, Éditions de l'anarchie, 1908, 179 p.
- Le Malthusianisme, le néo-malthusianisme et le point de vue individualiste, 1910.
- La Procréation volontaire au point de vue individualiste, 1910.
- Est-ce cela que vous appelez « vivre ? », 1910.
- Les Ouvriers, les syndicats et les anarchistes, 1910.
- Mon point de vue de « l'anarchisme individualiste », 1911.
- La Vie comme expérience, 1916.
- Les besoins factices, les stimulants et les individualistes, 1917.
- Le plus grand danger de l'après-guerre, 1917.
- Lettre ouverte aux travailleurs des champs, 1919.
- L'illégalisme anarchiste. Le mécanisme judiciaire et le point de vue individualiste, 1923.
- L'illégaliste anarchiste est-il notre camarade ?, 1923. in english
- L'Initiation individualiste anarchiste, 1923.
- Entretien sur la liberté de l'amour, 1924.
- L'ABC de « nos » revendications individualistes anarchistes, 1924.
- Liberté sexuelle, 1925.
- Amour libre et liberté sexuelle, 1925.
- Realism and Idealism mixed – Reflections of an Anarchist Individualist. 1926.
- Ways of Life in Common without State nor Authority: Sexual and Economic Experiences through History. 1931
- Libertinage and Prostitution: great prostitutes and famous libertines: influence of the sexual act in the political and social life of humanity 1936
- La révolution sexuelle et la camaraderie amoureuse [The Sexual Revolution and the Loving Fellowship]. Paris: Zones. 2009 [1934]. ISBN 9782355220104. OCLC 319674542.

== Publications ==
- L'Anarchie
- L'Ère nouvelle (1901–1911)
- Hors du troupeau (1911)
- Par-delà la Mêlée (1916)
- L'EnDehors (1922)
- L'Unique (1945)

== See also ==
- Anarchism in France
- Individualist anarchism in Europe
- Individualist anarchism in France
- List of peace activists
