= Louis Moreau =

French artist (1883–1958)

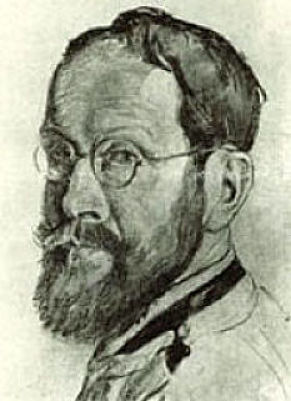
- Born: April 15, 1883; Châteauroux, Indre, Centre, French Third Republic
- Died: March 9, 1958 (aged 74); Malakoff, Seine, French Fourth Republic
- Movement: Anarchism

Louis Moreau (1883–1958) was a French wood-engraver, anarchist and militant pacifist.
