= Henri de Lacaze-Duthiers =

French biologist, anatomist and zoologist (1821–1901)

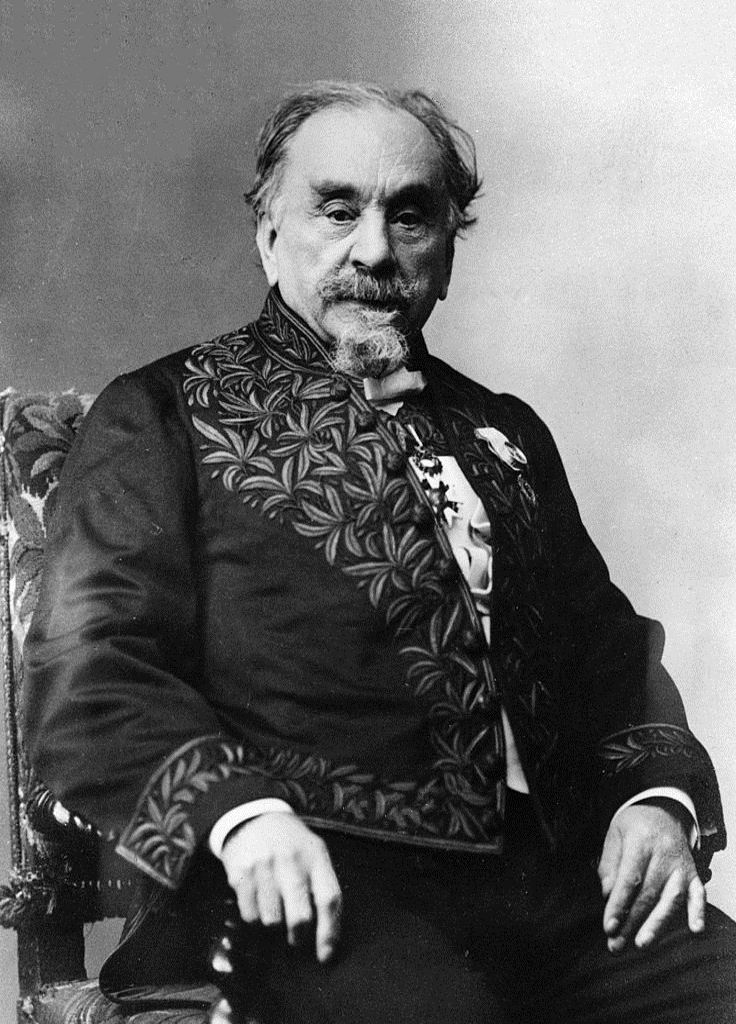
- Born: 15 May 1821; Montpezat, France
- Died: 21 July 1901 (aged 80)
- Citizenship: France
- Scientific career
- Fields: Biology, zoology
- Thesis: Recherches sur l'armure génitale femelle des insectes (1853)

Félix Joseph Henri de Lacaze-Duthiers (15 May 1821 – 21 July 1901) was a French biologist, anatomist and zoologist born in Montpezat in the department of Lot-et-Garonne. He was a leading authority in the field of malacology.

He studied medicine in Paris, and worked at Necker Hospital under Armand Trousseau (1801–1867). Later on, with Jules Haime (1824–1856), he travelled to the Balearic Islands to study marine life. In 1854, he returned to Paris as an assistant to Henri Milne-Edwards (1800–1885), and soon afterwards became a professor of zoology in Lille.

In 1865, he succeeded Achille Valenciennes (1794–1865) as chair of histoire naturelle des mollusques, des vers et des zoophytes at the National Museum of Natural History, France, and in 1868 became a professor at the University of Paris. In 1871, he was elected to French Academy of Sciences in the department of anatomy and zoology.

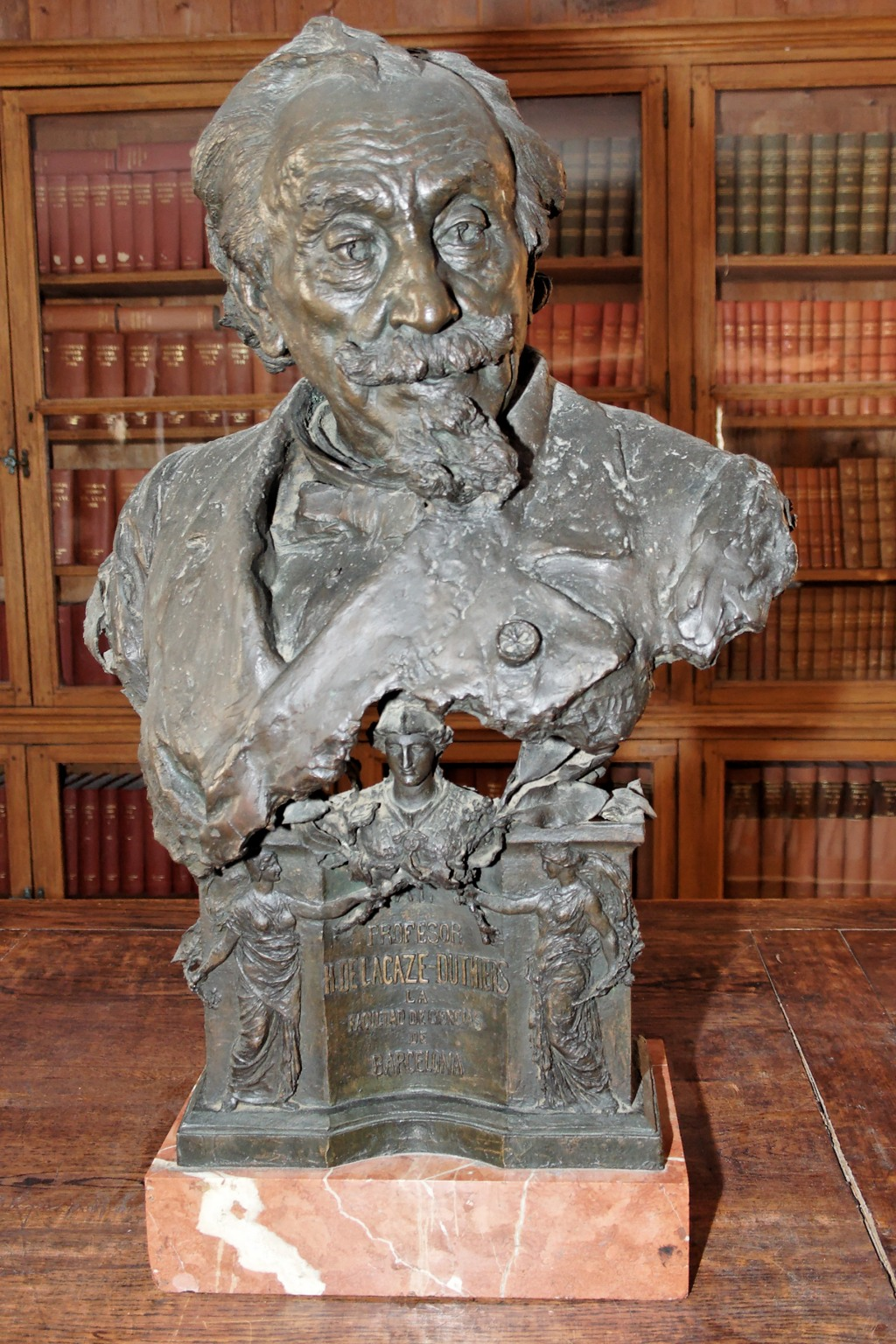
Bronze bust of Lacaze-Duthiers

Lacaze-Duthiers is remembered for his study of the anatomy and developmental history of mussels, coral, snails, brachiopods and other invertebrate marine animals. In 1858, he discovered three mollusks in the Mediterranean that produced purple-blue dyes. One of the species, named murex trunculus, was the source of the distinctive purple-blue dye used by the ancient Phoenicians and Canaanites. He realised the dying process could be used to create a photographic image in purple-blue dye which he named the Mucographé process. Examples are preserved in the Sorbonne and the Royal Society in London.

He conducted pioneer exploration of marine life of coastal Algeria, that included scientific studies of coral. A result of this research was the publication of "Histoire naturelle du corail" (1864).

He was the founder of two laboratories devoted to marine biology; the biological station at Roscoff in 1872, and the Arago laboratory at Banyuls-sur-Mer in 1882. A number of species bear his name, a few of them being: Strophomenia lacazei, Convoluta lacazi and Dileptus lacazei. In 1872, he founded the journal "Archives de zoologie expérimentale et générale" (Archives of Experimental and General Zoology).
