= Gérard de Lacaze-Duthiers =

French anarchist writer (1876–1958)

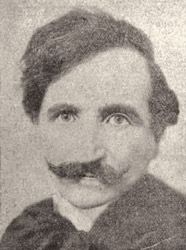
Gérard de Lacaze-Duthiers

Gérard de Lacaze-Duthiers (26 January 1876 – 3 May 1958) was a French writer, art critic, pacifist and anarchist.

Lacaze-Duthiers, an art critic for the Symbolist review journal La Plume, was influenced by Oscar Wilde, Nietzsche and Max Stirner. His (1906) L'Ideal Humain de l'Art helped found the 'Artistocracy' movement - a movement advocating life in the service of art. His ideal was an anti-elitist aestheticism: "All men should be artists". Together with André Colomer and Manuel Devaldes, he founded L'Action d'Art, an anarchist literary journal, in 1913.

He was a contributor to the Anarchist Encyclopedia. After World War II he contributed to the journal L'Unique.

== Works ==
- L'Ideal Humain de l'Art, 1905.
- Le Découverte de la Vie, 1906.
- Guy de Maupassant: son œuvre: portrait et autographe: document pour l'histoire de la littérature française, 1926.
- Manuels et intellectuels, 1932.
- Visages de ce temps: visages de mensonge, visages de haine, visages de fous, 1950.
- C'était en 1900: souvenirs et impressions (1895-1905), 1957.
