= Émile Pouget =

French anarchist and revolutionary syndicalist (1860–1931)

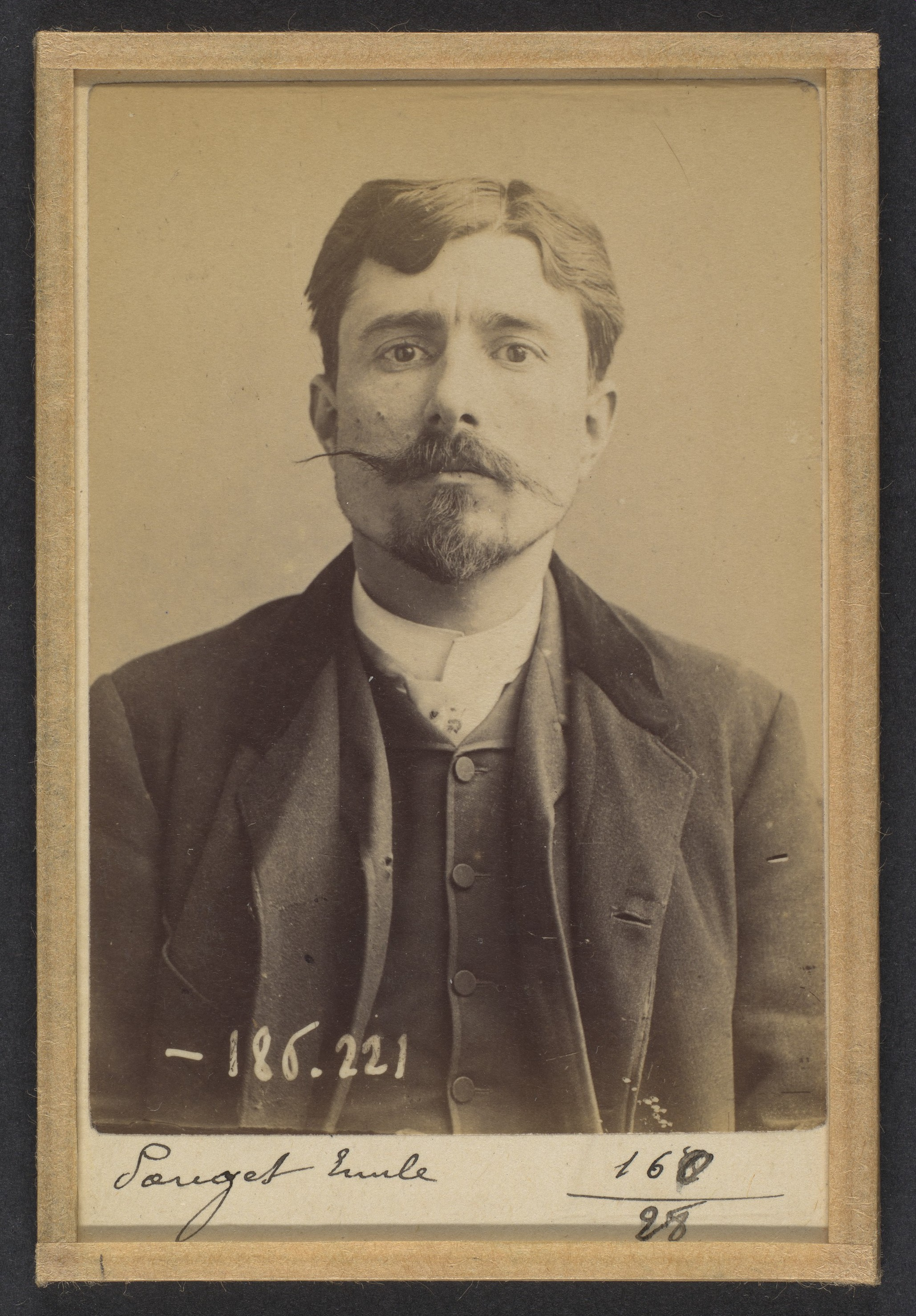
- 1892 mugshot of Pouget
- Born: 12 October 1860; Pont-de-Salars, Aveyron, France
- Died: 21 July 1931 (aged 70); Palaiseau, Seine-et-Oise, France
- Occupations: Journalist, writer
- Years active: 1879–1915
- Movement: Anarchism; Revolutionary syndicalism
- Partner: Stéphanie Boisteux (1882–1904)

Émile Pouget (French: [emil puʒɛ]; 12 October 1860 – 21 July 1931) was a French journalist, anarchist pamphleteer and trade unionist, known for his pivotal role in the development of revolutionary syndicalism in France. His newspaper Le Père Peinard stood out from previous anarchist publications with its inventive use of vernacular and urban slang. Notably, Pouget introduced the term "sabotage" as a tactical approach, a concept later adopted by the General Confederation of Labour (CGT) at its Toulouse Congress in 1897. Pouget's combination of anarchist political theory and revolutionary syndicalist tactics has led several authors to identify him as an early anarcho-syndicalist.

Having been introduced to radical politics through his stepfather's involvement in political journalism, Pouget emerged as a prominent figure in the anarchist movement. In 1883, Pouget and Louise Michel were jailed after they led a protest at Les Invalides, where the emblematic anarchist black flag is said to have been flown for the first time. The enactment of the Lois scélérates, which sought to suppress anarchist activities, forced Pouget into exile in London from 1894 to 1895. There, he was exposed to international anarchist militants like Errico Malatesta, as well as the British trade unionist movement, which inspired his contributions to revolutionary syndicalism. Returning to France, Pouget resumed his political activities, starting the newspaper La Sociale in 1895 and collaborating closely with Fernand Pelloutier to promote revolutionary syndicalist ideas within the French labor movement. By 1902, he had become an integral part of the revolutionary faction within CGT leadership, and was arrested with other leaders of the CGT in 1908 following violent strikes in Draveil and Villeneuve-Saint-Georges. After his release, Pouget began to distance himself from activism, a trend that accelerated following the collapse of his final newspaper, La Révolution, in 1909. He lived quietly outside Paris until his death in 1931.

== Early life ==
Émile Pouget was born on 12 October 1860 in Pont-de-Salars in the department of Aveyron. His father, a notary, died at an early age in 1863. Shortly after his father's death, Pouget's mother remarried. He grew up in a middle-class household with Republican and left-wing tendencies. Pouget's stepfather Philippe Vergely lost his position as a petty official because of his political writings in a small-scale journal that he had established titled L'Aveyron Republicain (The Aveyron Republican). Vergely took the young Pouget to attend the trial of several members of the Narbonne Commune in nearby Rodez, which played a pivotal role in sparking Pouget's interest in politics.

Studying high school in Rodez, Pouget developed a passion for journalism. In 1875, he launched his first newspaper, Le Lycéen républicain (The Republican High Schooler). That same year, his stepfather died and Pouget was forced to move to Paris in search of work. In 1877, he began working at Le Bon Marché, a department store in the city. While employed there, he started following political gatherings and attended meetings of progressive groups in his free time. In 1879, Pouget was a founder of the first shop assistants' union in Paris, through which he published his earliest antimilitarist texts.

== Anarchist movement ==
From 1882 onwards, Pouget entered a relationship with Stéphanie Boisteux. She supported him in the following years, including during his exile years.

During the 1880s, before anarchists began to enter the organized labor movement in large numbers, they typically agitated among the unemployed. In March 1883, the chamber of the carpenters' union summoned the unemployed to protest at Les Invalides. This protest split into two groups, with around 500 protesters, led by Pouget and former Communard Louise Michel, proceeding to march toward the Boulevard Saint-Germain. It was at this protest that the emblematic anarchist black flag was flown for the first time. The protesters pillaged three bakeries before being confronted by police at Place Maubert. Michel and Pouget were arrested and sentenced to six and eight years in prison respectively. Pouget's case was complicated by the fact that revolutionary antimilitarist leaflets advocating mutiny were found in his room. Public opinion towards the trial was somewhat negative, leading to both activists' early release. Pouget was granted amnesty after serving only three years of his sentence, thanks to pressure from Henri Rochefort.

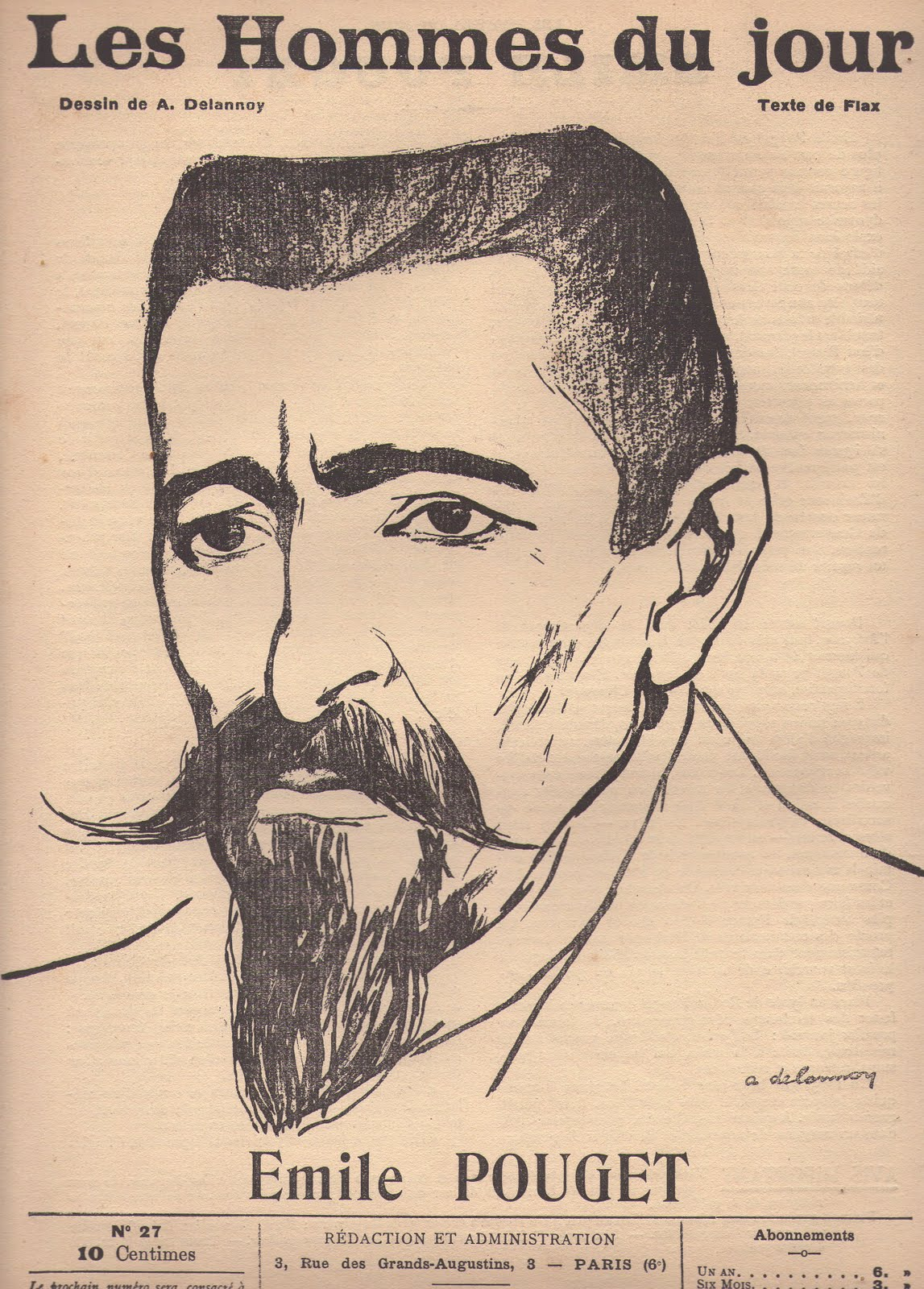
Portrait by Aristide Delannoy

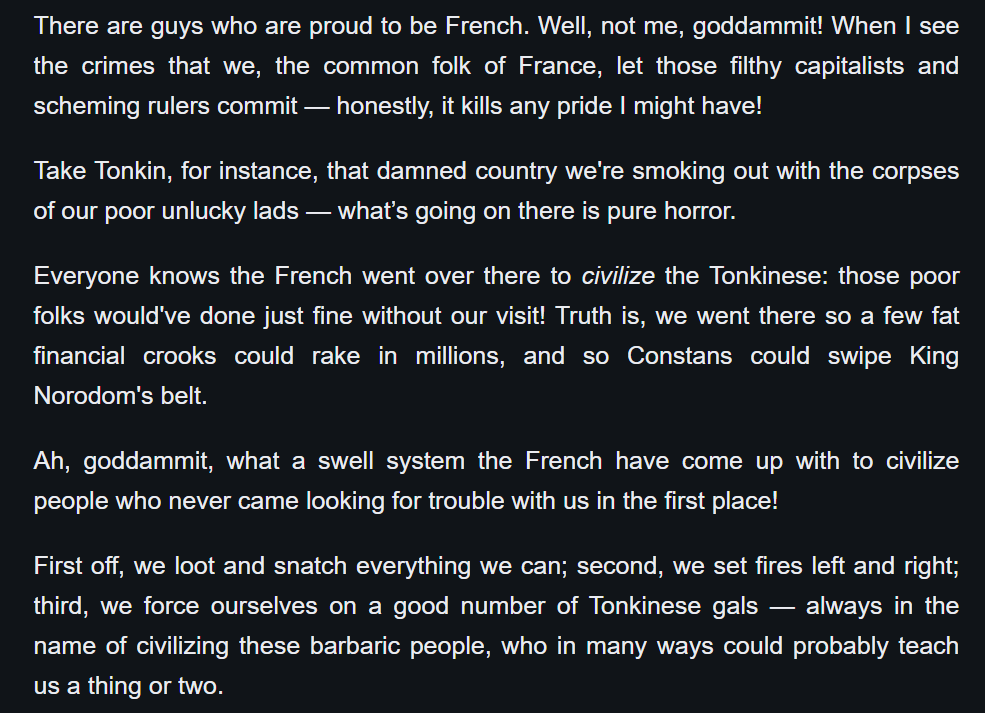
First lines of his anticolonial article "French Barbarity" on the colonization of Vietnam (12 January 1890)

After his release from prison, Pouget edited the anarchist bimonthly Ça ira from 27 May 1888 to 13 January 1889, in collaboration with former Communard Constant Martin. He became a regular at meetings of the Cercle Anarchiste International, which gathered in Paris' 15th arrondissement to discuss tactics including the general strike and a potential alliance with the Bourse du Travail labor councils. On 24 February 1889, he established his iconic newspaper, Le Père Peinard. Reminiscent of Rochefort's La Lanterne (The Lantern), the paper was published in small pamphlet form. It was written in working-class French slang and was inspired in tone by Jacques Hébert's Le Père Duchesne, popular during the Reign of Terror. In a September 1889 edition of Le Père Peinard, Pouget praised the London dock strike, marking the first step in his evolution into syndicalism. However, at this time, he criticized the British workers' formal association into labor unions and especially the unions' parliamentary orientation and reformism.

Following the promulgation of the Lois scélérates, a set of press laws outlawing the advocacy of any crime, in December 1893, the anarchist movement started a series of political assassinations. This in turn led to a series of arrests of prominent anarchists, and on 21 February 1894 Pouget went into exile to avoid the Trial of the Thirty. Pouget and his partner Marie travelled to Algiers and then London, where they stayed in Giovanni Defendi's delicatessen and from which he continued to publish Le Pére Peinard.

Pouget's period of exile in London led to a cross-pollination of ideas between anarchist militants from several countries around Europe. During this time, he avoided the anarchist circle Club Autonomie, composed mainly of French immigrants in London, but maintained contact with Louise Michel, Augustin Hamon and Fernand Pelloutier. Crucially, Pouget's tactical approach became heavily influenced by an international group of militants including Errico Malatesta and Olivia Rossetti Agresti, all of whom were contributors to the anarchist newspaper The Torch of Anarchy.

In August 1894, Pouget was charged in absentia during the Trial of the Thirty, but was ultimately acquitted. During his exile, he planned to start a newspaper called Le Droit à l'Aisance (The Right to Comfort) with the help of Malatesta, but in the end relaunched Le Père Peinard in September 1894 from London. The London-based newspaper ran for six months and printed a total of eight issues. In October 1894, the newspaper argued in favor of anarchists participating within the trade union movement, as a space in which to make contact with the wider working class outside of anarchist affinity groups and subcultures.

Pouget had been in contact with Malatesta since 1893, but was influenced by him even more profoundly during his time in London; at some point they even shared dwellings at Defendi's delicatessen. Pouget's period in London led to his adoption of syndicalist tactics which would, together with Pelloutier's similar trajectory, prove instrumental in the eventual rise to dominance of revolutionary syndicalism in the French labor movement. His combination of anarchist political theory and revolutionary syndicalist tactics has led several authors to identify Pouget as an early anarcho-syndicalist.

== Syndicalism and the CGT ==
After returning to France in 1895, Pouget resumed his political activities. On 11 May 1895, he started the newspaper La Sociale, through which he started promoting a more strategic and concrete form of anarchism which would work to influence the labor union movement from within. During the publishing of La Sociale, Pouget collaborated closely with Fernand Pelloutier and Bernard Lazare, advocating for revolutionary syndicalist ideas within the French labor movement and seeking to unite anarchists with antiparliamentarian socialists across Europe.

In July 1896, Pouget attended the fourth congress of the Second International in London. At this congress, the antiparliamentarian delegates, the majority of whom were anarchists, were expelled from the international. This marked the culmination of the process which started with the exclusion of the anarchists at the Zürich Congress three years prior. The antiparliamentarians set up a debate in margin to the London Congress where, concurring with Malatesta's views, Pouget criticized the Marxists' economic determinism and argued against forcibly collectivizing agricultural land, as well as the notion of waiting in anticipation for the ostensibly inevitable proletarianization of the peasant class.

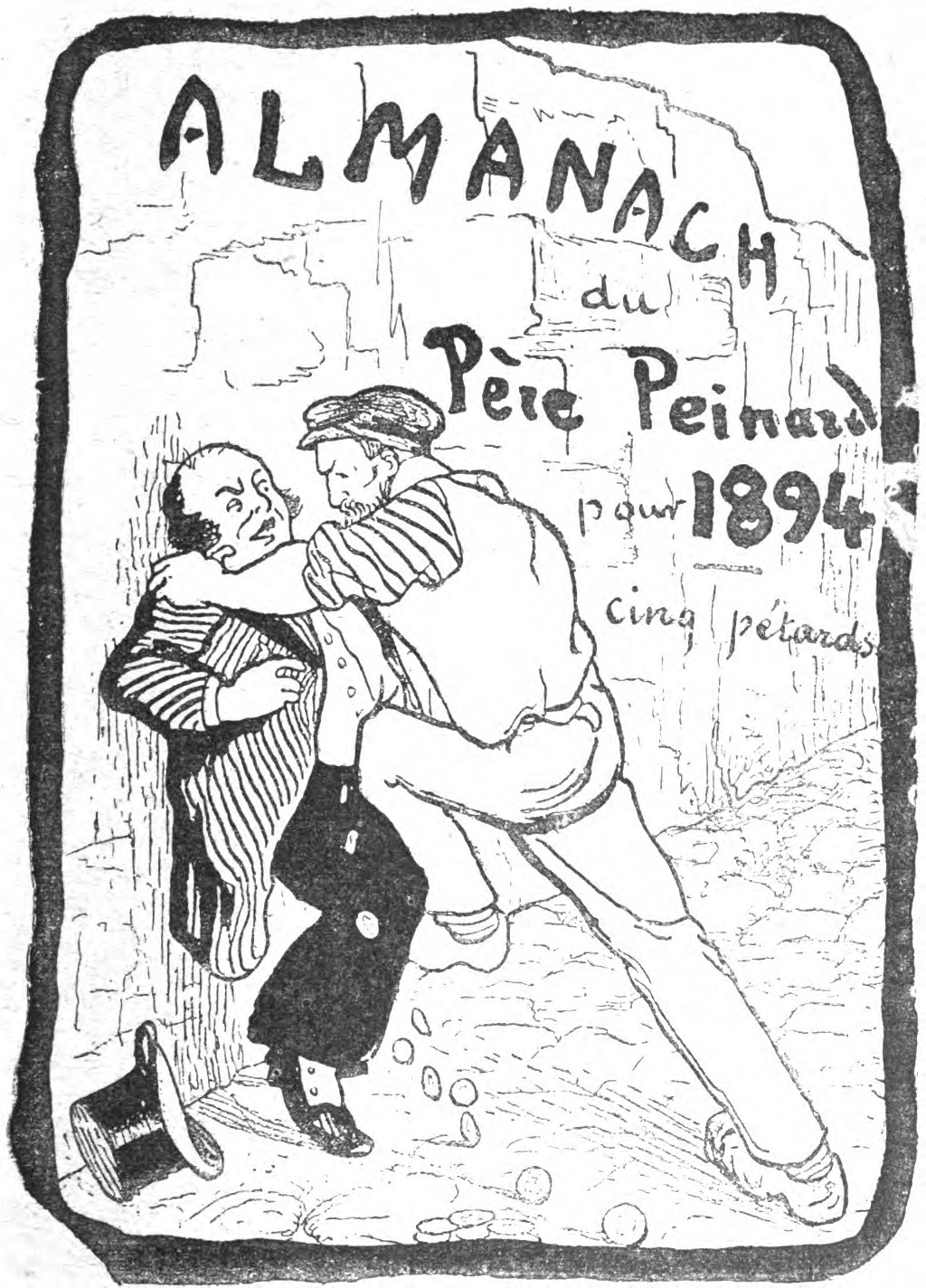
Illustration on the cover of the 1894 Almanach du Père Peinard

In La Sociale, Pouget first argued for the tactic of "sabottage", as it was initially spelled. This tactic was inspired by the concept of "ca'canny", meaning slowdown, which he came into contact with in the British trade union movement. This was the first mention of the term "sabotage" in this context. The newspaper continued until October 1896, when Pouget started publishing a renewed Le Père Peinard in which his views became increasingly internationalist and militant. He passionately argued for sabotage as a tactic of the labor movement, leading to its adoption by the General Confederation of Labour (CGT) at its Toulouse Congress in September 1897. His views on sabotage, as well as a nod to its origins in the British movement, were outlined in greater detail in his 1898 pamphlet "Le Sabotage". For Pouget, sabotage would entail "poor work for poor pay", as well as physical damage against machines and property, but not persons.

During the mid-1890s, the Dreyfus affair, stemming from accusations of espionage against the French Jewish Captain Alfred Dreyfus, intensified into a major political and judicial scandal. French society became deeply polarized, with supporters of Dreyfus known as Dreyfusards and opponents labeled anti-Dreyfusards, reflecting underlying tensions of antisemitism. Pouget was initially reluctant to support the Dreyfusard cause, proclaiming his lack of interest in defending a capitalist and even going so far as to employ antisemitic stereotypes. However, during 1898 his views began to shift. He used the instability to organize a campaign in favor of anarchists condemned to forced labour, and in October co-signed a manifesto of a Revolutionary Coalition Committee which brought together various libertarian factions in opposition to anti-Dreyfusard nationalism. In February 1899, Pouget became a contributor to Sébastien Faure's Dreyfusard Journal du peuple (The People's Journal), where he argued for a revolutionary defense of Dreyfus against the reactionary forces of the army and Catholic Church, and against relying on the impartiality of the legal system.

In 1900, Le Père Peinard was discontinued and Pouget became the editor of the CGT's daily newspaper La Voix du peuple (Voice of the People), its title a reference to Pierre-Joseph Proudhon. The first issue was published on 1 December 1900.

The year 1902 marked the culmination of the anarchist permeation of trade unions, with the merger of the CGT and the Fédération des Bourses de travail, a federation of local labor exchanges. The Fédération had been headed by anarchist Georges Yvetot from March 1901, following the death of Fernand Pelloutier. The now enlarged CGT elected former Blanquist Victor Griffuelhes as general secretary, while Yvetot and his former assistant Paul Delesalle headed the section of Bourses du Travail and Pouget headed the section of national federations as vice-secretary and remained the editor of La Voix du peuple. Pouget, Griffuelhes, Yvetot and Delesalle thus became the effective leaders of the syndicalist movement in France in the following decade, forming the revolutionary faction of the union's leadership.

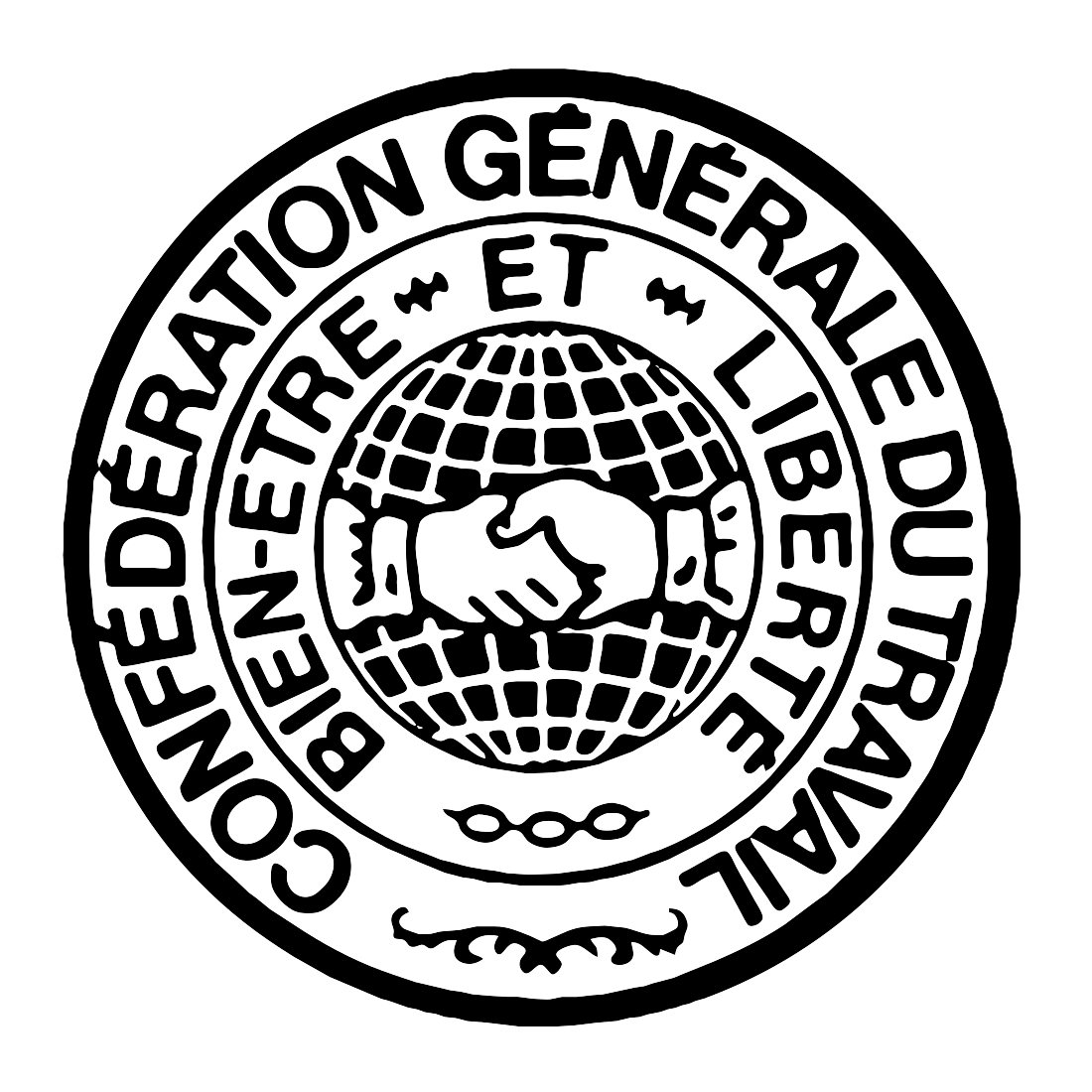
1906 logo of the General Confederation of Labor (CGT)

Tensions came to the fore between reformist and revolutionary wings of the CGT in 1903. Pouget emerged as the leading polemicist in defense of the leading revolutionary faction, opposed by the reformist Auguste Keufer. The two exchanged views in two articles regarding the theme of reform or revolution in 1903, where Pouget argued that their methods were not necessarily opposed to one another. His position was that the struggle for immediate reforms, if done through direct action, was not only an end in itself, but also an evolutionary moment in a process of social change which would gradually intensify to the point of revolution and the overthrow of wage labor. Therefore, he argued, individual reforms served to build a mass social movement with sufficient strength and consciousness to challenge and ultimately end capitalism. For Pouget, direct action meant the activity of trade unions, undertaken without reliance on political actors. Another major point of contention was the method of selection and representation within the CGT, with Keufer advocating for proportional representation, which favored larger unions, while Pouget argued for equal representation regardless of a union's size. Pouget's stance reflected his broader disdain for representative democracy, the adoption of which within the CGT he feared would suppress the "conscious minority". Keufer's proposals were in the end heavily defeated at the 1904 Congress of Bourges and the incumbent CGT leadership secured an easy victory.

In 1904, Boisteux died, leaving Pouget in a very sad condition. Augustin Hamon wrote a letter to him in order to support him, remembering the dead Boisteux with fondness.

The issue reappeared at the Congress of Amiens in October 1906. Here, the two factions agreed on the Charter of Amiens, co-drafted by Pouget, which codified the union's revolutionary syndicalism. The charter announced the complete autonomy of the syndicalist movement and denied all political allegiances, and was the result of a political compromise that both factions could interpret to their advantage. Namely, for the revolutionary faction, this affirmed its stance against compromise with political parties and thus against parliamentarism, whereas for the reformist faction, this meant an aversion to all forms of politics including anarchism.

In May 1908, strikes erupted in Draveil and Villeneuve-Saint-Georges with the CGT eagerly sending recruiters in support of the striking quarry workers. After a month of demonstrations, the strikers clashed with the police who opened fire leaving two workers dead and ten wounded. Following the strikes, the leaders of the CGT, including Pouget, were arrested. The union convened in Marseille and reaffirmed its tactical position, however the reformist faction started blaming the leadership for the deaths due to their "reckless tactics". On 2 February 1909, Griffuelhes resigned and the CGT elected reformist Louis Niel to the position of general secretary.

After his release from prison, Pouget did not return to his position in the CGT or in La Voix du peuple. According to Pierre Monatte, this decision might have been influenced by a growing personal antipathy towards Griffuelhes, which became apparent in Pouget's vehement rejection of the proposal for Griffuelhes to assume an administrative role in the new newspaper he was preparing. In February 1909, Pouget and other members of the revolutionary faction launched the newspaper La Révolution. It was badly financed and a commercial failure, and ran only until March of that same year. After the failure of this newspaper, Pouget became disillusioned and ceased his participation in the syndicalist movement.

== Later years and death ==
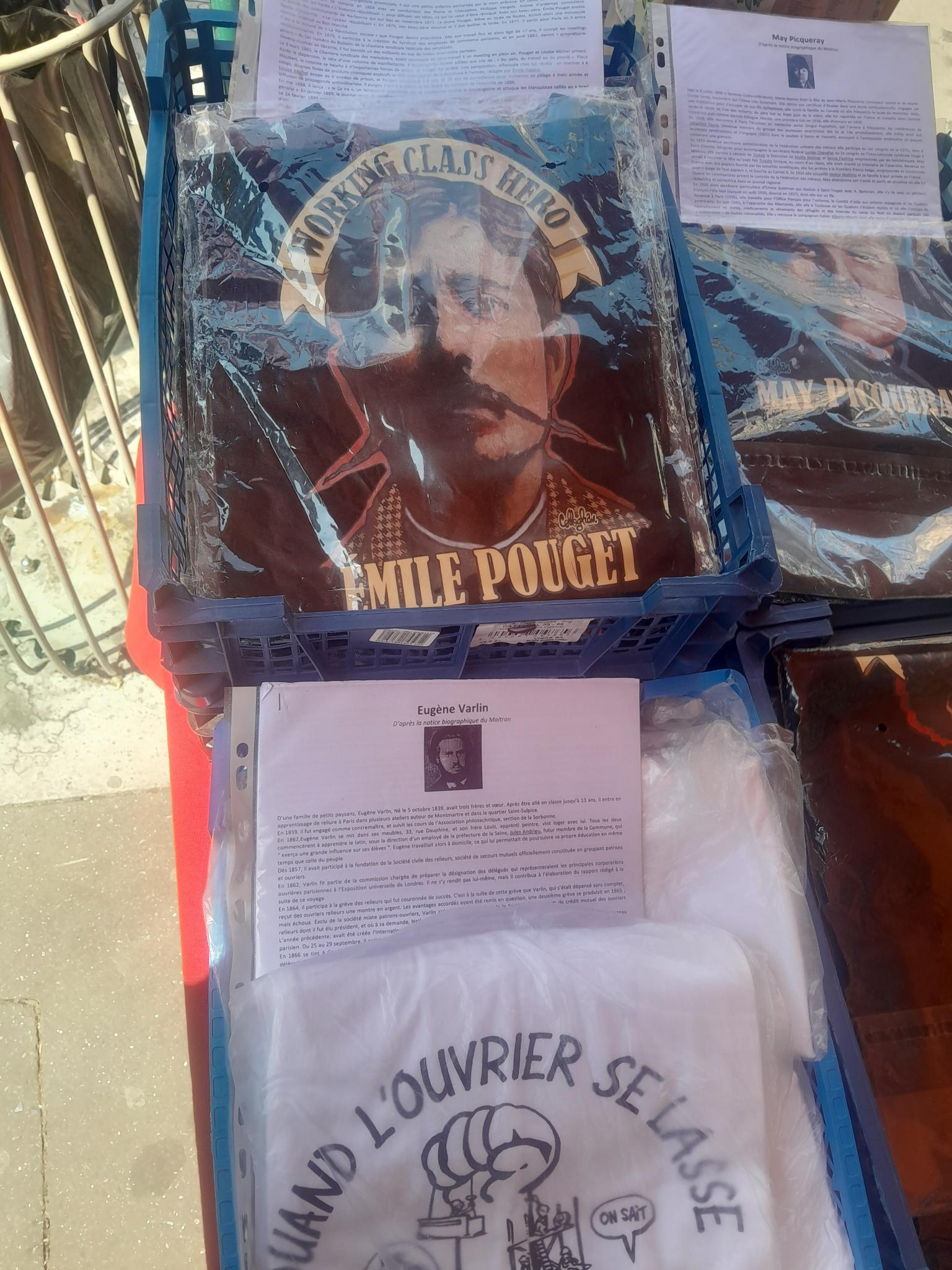
Stand of the CNT-Construction during the Anarchist demonstration of 1 May in Paris in 2026, selling T-shirts of anarchist figures, including Pouget

Following the failure of La Révolution in March of the same year, Pouget transitioned to become a regular columnist in Gustave Hervé's insurrectionist La Guerre sociale in late 1909, signaling a shift away from his involvement in syndicalism. Nonetheless, he maintained his advocacy for syndicalist tactics such as the general strike and sabotage until the outbreak of World War I. Additionally, he authored several stories in Jean Jaurès' L'Humanité in 1913. From July until 6 September 1914, Pouget unexpectedly lent his unequivocal support to France against Germany. The following year, he authored a daily serial in L'Humanité titled Vieille Alsace (Old Alsace), a patriotic story concerning the lives of French Alsatians living under German rule.

By 1920, Pouget was no longer involved in activism. He spent his final years living a quiet life in the southern outskirts of Paris with his wife, earning a modest living compiling artists' catalogues.

Pouget died on 21 July 1931, in Lozère, a neighborhood of Palaiseau. He was interred at the cemetery of Palaiseau.

== Works ==
=== Articles ===
- (12 January 1890) French Barbarity, Le Père Peinard, n°45, Paris (French: Barbarie française)
- (3 August 1890) The Socialist little Rats, Le Père Peinard, Paris (French: Les Ratichons Socialos)
- (10 August 1890) A pig, Le Père Peinard, Paris (French: Un cochon)
- (25 April 1891) May 1st, Le Père Peinard, Paris (French: Le 1er Mai)
- (24 January 1892) At the Palace of Injustice, Le Père Peinard, Paris (French: Au Palais de l'Injustice)
- (26 February 1892) The big Scare!, Le Père Peinard, Paris (French: La grande Trouille!)
- (26 February 1892) Anarcho villains, Le Père Peinard, Paris (French: Anarchos malfaiteurs)
- (24 April 1892) The trial of the dynamiters, Le Père Peinard, Paris (French: Anarchos malfaiteurs)
- (25 September 1892) The La Villette Refinery Women, Le Père Peinard, Paris (French: Raffineuses de La Villette)
- (4 June 1893) Patron assassin, Le Père Peinard, Paris (English: Assassin Boss)
- (1894) Pourquoi et comment Le Père Peinard s'est bombardé Journaleux, Almanach du Père Peinard (English: Why and How Père Peinard Became a Journalist)
- (1894) Jabotage entre bibi et un fiston, Almanach du Père Peinard, Paris (English: A Chat Between Meself and a Lad)
- (January 1895 - London series) A Judas!, Le Père Peinard, Paris (French: Un Judas !)
- (1896) Faramineuse consultation sur l'avenir, Almanach du Père Peinard, Paris (English: Far-Reaching Consultation on the Future)
- (1896) Le Muselage Universel, Almanach du Père Peinard, Paris (English: The Universal Muzzle)
- (1897) L'Automne, Almanach du Père Peinard, Paris (English: Autumn)
- (1897) Le Printemps, Almanach du Père Peinard, Paris (English: Spring)
- (1897) L'Hiver, Almanach du Père Peinard, Paris (English: Winter)
- (1897) L'été, Almanach du Père Peinard, Paris (English: Summer)
- (1898) Le Sabotage, Almanach du Père Peinard, Paris (English: Sabotage)
- (1899) Qu'on châtre la frocaille ! En attendant mieux, Le Père Peinard, Paris (English: Let's Castrate the Frocks! While Waiting for Better)

=== Almanacs ===
- (1894) Almanach du Père Peinard, Paris (English: Almanac of Père Peinard)
- (1896) Almanach du Père Peinard, Paris
- (1897) Almanach du Père Peinard, Paris
- (1898) Almanach du Père Peinard, Paris

=== Brochures ===
- (1897) Variations guesdistes (English: Guesdist changes)
- (1899) Les lois scélérates de 1893-1894, in collaboration with Francis de Pressensé and Léon Blum, Paris: La Revue blanche (English: The Villainous Laws of 1893-1894)
- (1902) Le Parti du Travail, Paris (English: The Party of Labor)
- (1904) L'action directe, Nancy: Le Réveil ouvrier (English: Direct Action)
- (1910) La Confédération générale du travail, Paris: Marcel Rivière (English: The General Confederation of Labor)
- (1911) Le Sabotage, Paris (English: Sabotage)

=== Novels ===
- (1909) Comment nous ferons la Révolution, in collaboration with Émile Pataud, Paris: Jules Tallandier (English: How We Shall Bring About The Revolution)

== Notes ==
Trade union offices
Preceded by New position	Administrative Secretary of the General Confederation of Labour; 1901–1902	Succeeded by Jean Bousquet
