= Stéphanie Boisteux =

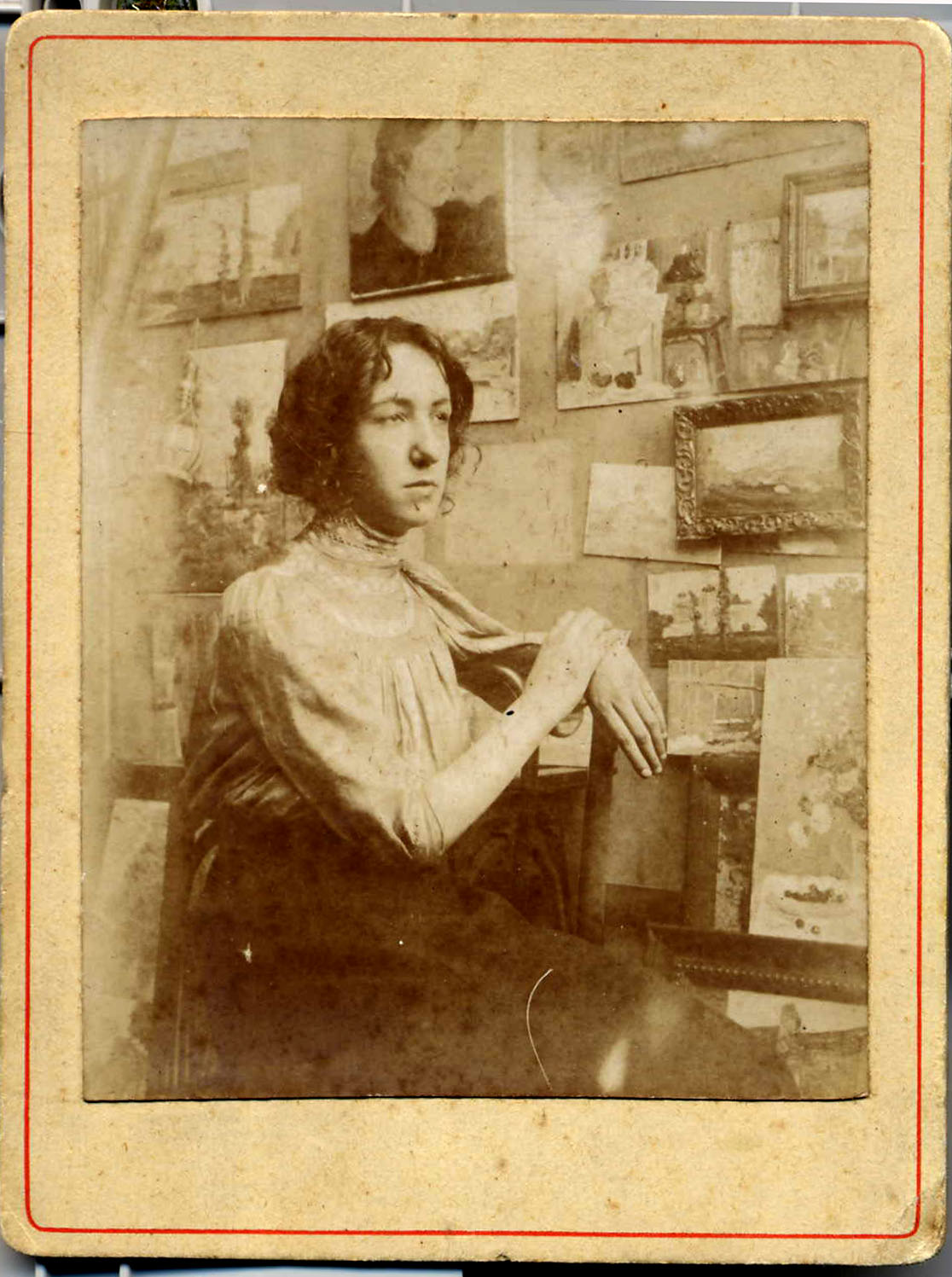
- Stéphanie Boisteux found by Marianne Enckell from the ICRA Lausanne to document her on the DIMA
- Born: 16 October 1850; Saint-Géréon, Loire-Inférieure, France
- Died: August 1, 1904 (aged 53); Paris (18th arrondissement), France
- Other name: Mère Peinard
- Years active: 22
- Movement: Anarchism
- Partner: Émile Pouget (1882–1904)

Stéphanie Boisteux (1850–1904), nicknamed La Mère Peinard (in English: Mother Chill), was a French anarchist. She is best known for having been the loyal companion (Note: The term companion in the current context contrasts with the conventional meaning of it in the English language. It denotes participation in the interpersonal relationship system in anarchist culture in Western Europe.) of Émile Pouget, a prominent figure in the movement, for twenty-two years until her death.

Throughout her relationship with Pouget, Boisteux supported him in his anarchist initiatives and during his exile in London. Her fellow companions affectionately gave her the nickname Mère Peinard, and anarchists such as Augustin Hamon remembered her extremely positively. After her death in 1904, she was cremated at the Père Lachaise Cemetery in Paris.

== Biography ==
Stéphanie Boisteux (sometimes spelt Boiteux) was born on 16 October 1850, in Saint-Géréon, a former commune in the Loire Atlantique department of western France, to Stéphanie Garnier and Alexis Boisteux.

Boisteux entered into a relationship with Émile Pouget in 1882, in which she remained until her death. Companions of both genders called her affectionately Mère Peinard (Mother Chill) in reference to Le Père Peinard, the title of her companion's newspaper. Throughout this entire period, her companion held a prominent place among anarchists in France. Consequently she moved in circles alongside key figures in the movement.

In 1894, Pouget and Boisteux went into exile to enable him to avoid the Trial of the Thirty. They travelled to Algiers and then to London, where they stayed in Giovanni Defendi's delicatessen, from which he continued to publish his iconic newspaper Le Père Peinard. While there, Pouget and very likely Boisteux, met anarchist militants from several countries around Europe.

French anarchist Augustin Hamon regarded Boisteux as being an important person in Pouget's life and he expressed his condolences to Pouget upon her death as follows:

'Having known Mrs. Pouget myself, and knowing how good she was, and what a companion she was to you, helping you endure the hardships of a militant's life, I can well imagine the pain and sadness gripping you […] she who, in London in 1894, somewhat softened the hardships of exile.' (Note: Hamon's papers are held at the International Institute of Social History in Amsterdam.)

Boisteux died in their home at 15 rue Véron in the 18th arrondissement of Paris, and was cremated at the Père-Lachaise Cemetery on 1 August 1904.
