= Paul Delesalle =

French anarchist and writer (1870–1948)

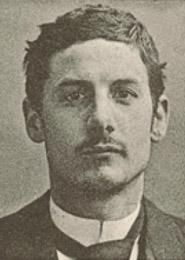
- Paul Delesalle
- Born: 29 July 1870; Issy-les-Moulineaux, Seine, France
- Died: 8 April 1948 (aged 77); Palaiseau, Seine-et-Oise, France
- Occupations: Precision instrument maker, bookseller
- Known for: CGT leader

Paul Delesalle (29 July 1870 – 8 April 1948) was a French anarchist and syndicalist who was prominent in the trade union movement. He started work as a machinist, became a journalist, and later became a bookseller, publisher and writer.

== Early years ==
Maurice Paul Delesalle was born on 29 July 1870 in Issy-les-Moulineaux, Seine. He came from a working-class family. He was trained as a metalworker, and made precision instruments. Delesalle became involved in anarchist activity in the 18th arrondissement of Paris, was arrested before May Day in 1892 and detained in Mazas Prison for eighteen days. In 1895 he built the first movie camera (appareil chronophotographique) following the plans of Auguste and Louis Lumière. Delesalle attended the Second International Congress in London from 26 July to 1 August 1896 as a trade union delegate rather than an anarchist. At the opening of the proceedings he tried to speak at the podium but was thrown down to the floor and injured. He contributed to the journal La Révolte and then worked for Les Temps nouveaux, where in 1897 he became the assistant of Jean Grave.

== Union activity ==
Delesalle thought that anarchist activity had to start with syndicalism, and became active in the General Confederation of Labour (France) (CGT: Confédération Générale du Travail). He was assistant secretary of the Federation of Trade Councils (Fédération des bourses du travail), and assistant secretary of the CGT Trade Councils section from 1897 to 1907. He became one of the most influential anarcho-syndicalists in France during this period. At the Congress of Toulouse in 1897 his motion advocating the use of general strikes, boycotts and sabotage was adopted unanimously.

For a period in 1906 and again in 1907 he filled in at the secretariat of the Trade Councils for Georges Yvetot, who was imprisoned. Delesalle was a regular writer in La Voix du peuple, the CGT journal, and edited the Labor section of Les Temps nouveaux until 1906. He left Les Temps nouveaux after writing an antisemitic article. In 1906 he was a member of Liberté d'opinion (Freedom of opinion), a committee to assist political prisoners. Other activists in the committee included René de Marmande, Charles Desplanques, Alphonse Merrheim, Émile Janvion and Auguste Garnery.

In 1906 Delesalle was involved in developing the Charter of Amiens. In this manifesto the CGT proclaimed that it was independent of all political movements. Delesalle took the position that the union was a basic part of the worker's life, unlike a political party which people could join or leave at any time as their opinions changed. The workers did not need capitalists or politicians, who served no useful function. Due to a CGT poster after the events in Midi in 1907 he was charged with insulting the army and provoking soldiers to disobedience, but was eventually acquitted.

== Bookseller ==
At the start of 1908 Delesalle set up as a bookseller and publisher in the rue Monsieur-le-Prince in the Latin quarter. He resigned from the CGT. His shop soon became a meeting place for militants, journalists and writers. He specialized in research of old political documents and works. Delesalle wrote several brochures on the CGT, Labor Exchanges, May Day and so on, and also published literary works. He was carried away with enthusiasm by the Russian Revolution in 1917, and briefly joined the Communist Party.

In 1932, suffering from depression, Delesalle sold his bookstore and retired to a small house in Palaiseau, Seine-et-Oise. There he devoted himself for the remainder of his life to studies of social history and of the Paris Commune. In the mid-1930s Delesalle wrote four articles for La Vie ouvrière on the First International during the Paris Commune, on the Revolutions of 1848, the June Days Uprising and the first Guesdist demonstration in 1880 at Père Lachaise Cemetery. The articles celebrated Marxism and political activism, He died in Palaiseau on 8 April 1948 aged 77. His wife Leona (1875–1966) survived him by almost twenty years.

== Selected works ==
- Paul Delesalle. Les deux méthodes du syndicalisme. Paris: La Publication sociale.
- Paul Delesalle (1899). Les conditions du travail chez les ouvriers en instruments de précision de Paris. Paris: Bourse du travail.
- Paul Delesalle (1900). La grève !. Paris: Temps nouveaux.
- Paul Delesalle (1901). L'action syndicale et les anarchistes. Paris: l'Education libertaire.
- Paul Delesalle (1907). La Confédération générale du travail. Historique, constitution, but, moyens... Paris: La Publication sociale. p. 31.
- Paul Delesalle (1908). Congrès anarchiste tenu à Amsterdam, août 1907. Paris: La Publication sociale.
- Paul Delesalle (1910). Les Bourses du Travail et la C.G.T., Bibliothèque du mouvement prolétarien. Rivière. p. 64.
- Paul Delesalle (1 September 1922). "Georges Sorel". L'Humanité.
- Paul Delesalle (1937). Paris sous la Commune: documents et souvenirs inédits. Au bureau d'éditions.
- Paul Delesalle, Émile Pouget. Histoire du syndicalisme révolutionnaire et de l'anarcho-syndicalisme.

== Sources ==
- Bantman, Constance (2015). "Delesalle, Paul (1870–1948)". Blackwell Reference.
- "Delesalle, Paul (1870-1948)". BnF (in French).
- "DELESALLE Paul [Maurice, Paul, dit]". Dictionnaire des anarchistes (in French). Maitron.
- Gildea, Robert (1996-01-01). The Past in French History. Yale University Press. ISBN 978-0-300-06711-8.
- Guérin, Daniel (2005). No Gods, No Masters: An Anthology of Anarchism. AK Press. ISBN 978-1-904859-25-3.
- "Paul Delesalle (1870-1948)". Anarlivres (in French).
- "René de Marmande", Ephéméride Anarchiste 22 octobre (in French)
- Schecter, Darrow (1994). Radical Theories: Paths Beyond Marxism and Social Democracy. Manchester University Press. ISBN 978-0-7190-4385-7.
