= Lois scélérates =

1893–94 anti-anarchist French laws

France
- Enacted: December 1893-July 1894
- Status: In force (amended)

The lois scélérates (English: Villainous laws) were a set of three anti-anarchist laws passed by the French state between December 1893 and the summer of 1894. Passed in a period the French public and press called l'Ère des attentats, these laws were adopted under the pretext of stopping anarchist propaganda of the deed attacks. The first law banned and criminalized the anarchist press while giving authorities greater powers for arrests without trial and raids. The second law condemned a new offense, the "understanding", which was poorly defined and used to criminalize anarchists. The third law, which was abolished in 1992, prohibited all anarchist 'activities'.

Immediately after they were passed, the laws were criticized for their disregard of several principles of criminal law by figures such as the anarchists Jean Grave and Émile Pouget, and socialists like Jean Jaurès, Léon Blum, and Francis de Pressensé. Despite the harshness of the laws' provisions, their application was inconsistent. While they could be used to further criminalize anarchists, they were difficult to defend in highly publicized trials, with the Trial of the Thirty resulting in the almost complete acquittal of all the accused. Moreover, the effects of those laws to stop anarchist terrorism is hugely debated, as they had the result of radicalizing anarchists which were already at large, effectively pushing for a resumption of attacks.

== History ==
=== Context ===
==== Repression ====
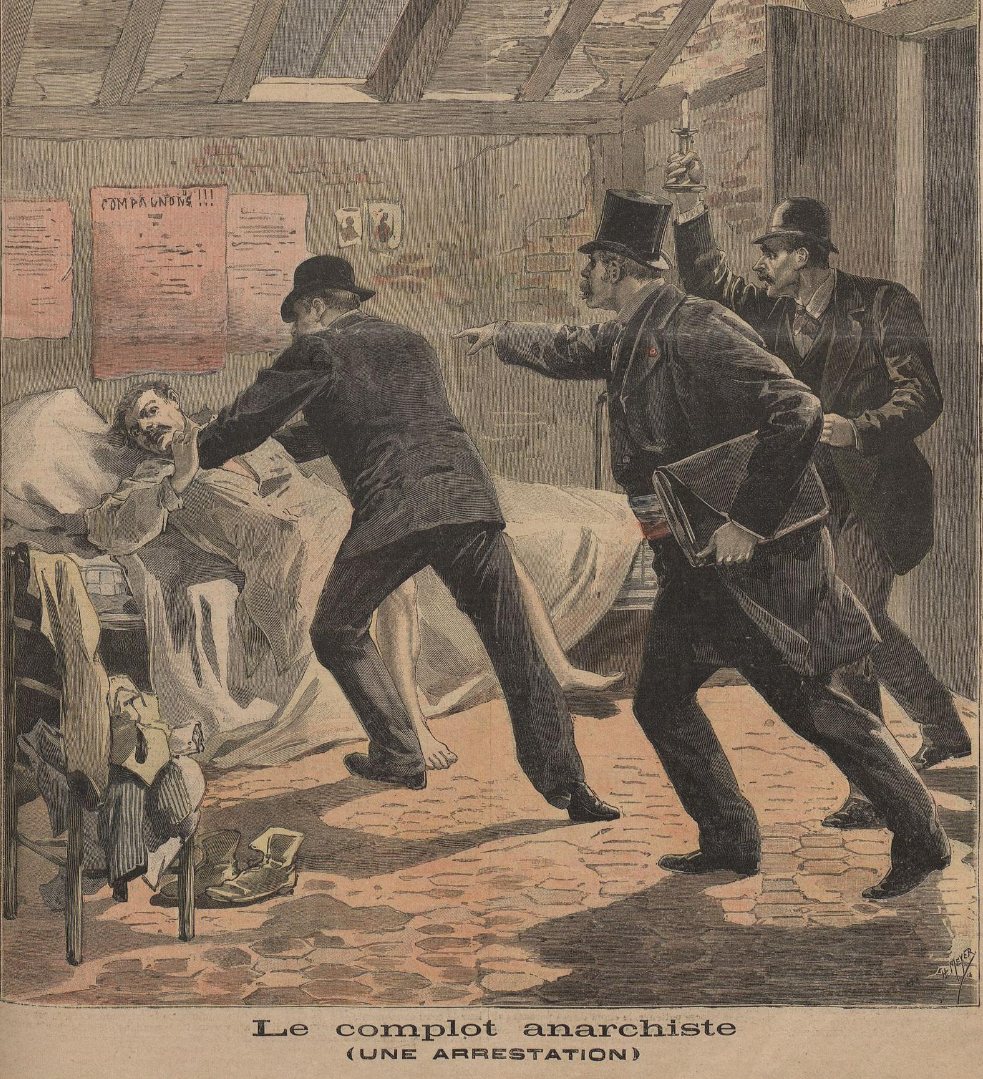
Representation of an anarchist arrest during the Ère des attentats, Le Petit Journal (3 June 1893) with the caption 'The anarchist plot : an arrest'

In the 19th century, anarchism emerged and took shape in Europe before spreading. Anarchists advocate a struggle against all forms of domination perceived as unjust including economic domination brought forth by capitalism. They are particularly opposed to the State, seen as the organization that legitimizes a good number of these dominations through its police, army and propaganda.

Following the repression of the Paris Commune (1871), anarchists were subjected to increasing government repression. While their initial methods were peaceful and relatively open, this repression pushed them to seek ways to avoid state surveillance and persecution. Among the laws targeting them, one could find, for example, the law of 14 March 1872, which criminalized 'organizations promoting strikes, the abolition of private property, family, or religion', a clear targeting of the Anti-authoritarian International, which was banned, and the relatively liberal Freedom of the Press law of 28 July 1881, which already declared that the Minister of the Interior could ban the distribution of a newspaper by simple decision. They were also targeted in several articles of the French criminal code.

==== Ère des attentats (1892–1894) ====
In parallel with this increasing repression, anarchists developed the idea and practice of propaganda of the deed, aiming to convey anarchist ideas directly through action, without relying on discourse. This practice gained importance in France starting in 1881 with the Thiers statue bombing and progressively spread, strengthening as repression intensified.

In 1892, following the harsh judicial treatment of anarchist victims of police violence in the Clichy affair, Ravachol and other anarchists launched a series of attacks that the French public and press dubbed the Ère des attentats. This period was marked by growing political violence from both the French state and anarchist terrorists. During the period, starting in April 1892, the French state started legal repression targeting anarchists, blocking their declarations at their trials from being read or shared in the press, for example.

After the execution of Ravachol—even though he had not killed anyone in his bombings—an anarchist named Auguste Vaillant decided to avenge him by throwing a bomb into the Chamber of Deputies, which he did on 9 December 1893. The deputies were only lightly injured, a deliberate choice on Vaillant's part, according to his testimony. During that time, both the French authorities and the press widely promoted the idea that anarchists were part of a vast international conspiracy, using this narrative to justify their repression.

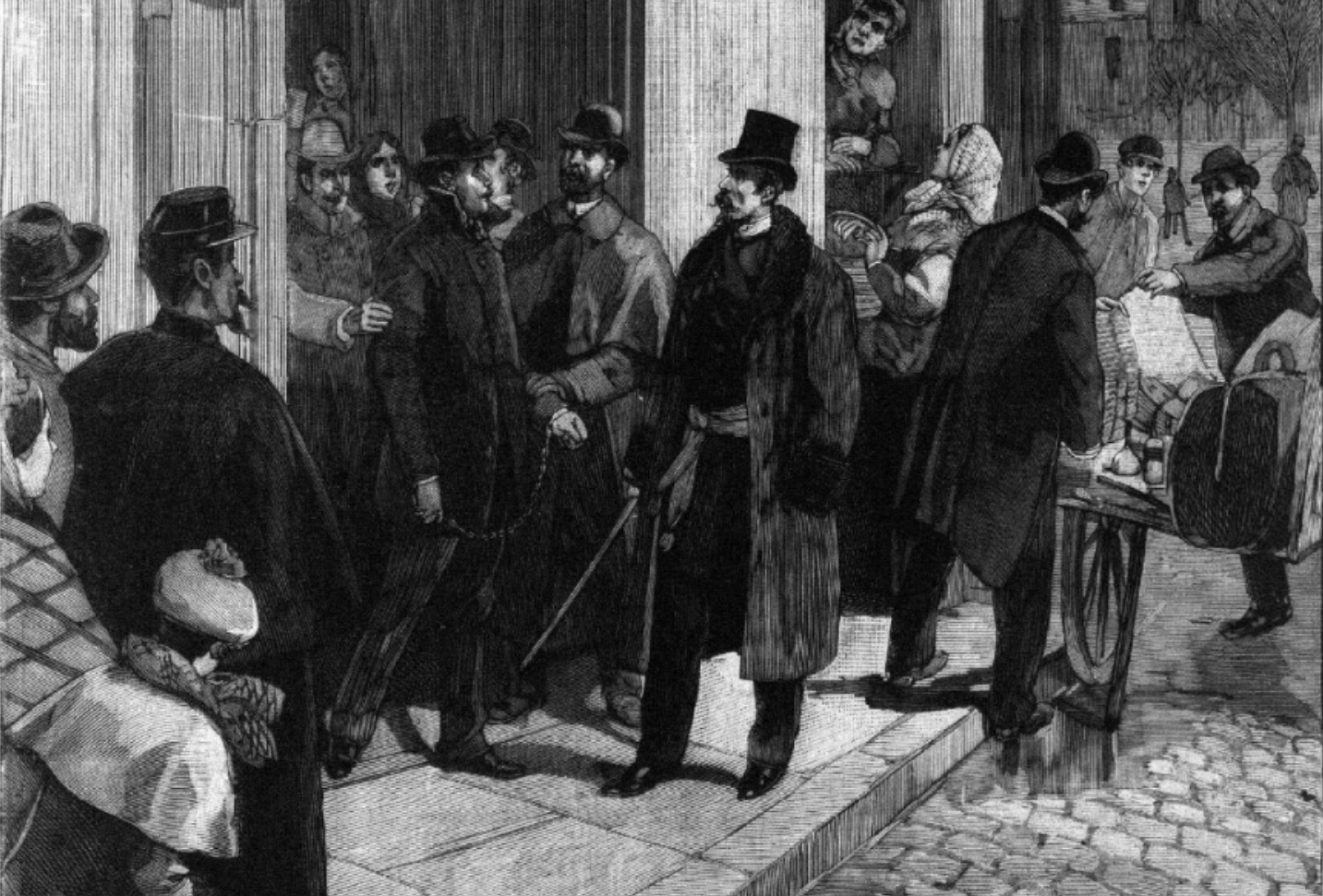
Representation of an anarchist being arrested in Le Petit Parisien: supplément illustré (4 April 1894)

=== Lois scélérates ===
==== First law (12 December 1893) ====
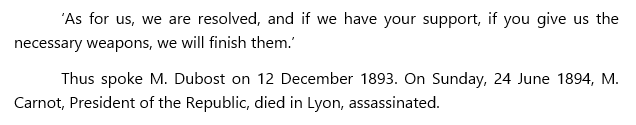
Excerpt of the criticisms by Pouget, Blum and Pressensé, talking about the uselessness of the villainous laws in combating terrorism

The arrest of Vaillant provided a 'very convenient pretext' for passing the first law. The law was drafted and ready in less than two days after the attack and was presented by Jean-Casimir Perier, the future President of the Republic who would succeed Sadi Carnot. The bill was presented to the Chamber of Deputies and simply read aloud from the podium; it was not distributed or printed for the deputies to review. Perier, with the help of Minister of Justice Antonin Dubost, quickly brought it to a vote, arguing for the urgency of the measure. Two socialist deputies attempted to block the vote by asking for clarifications on the law, but were unsuccessful. The law was passed after less than half an hour of debate by an immense majority of the Chamber, with the exception of a few socialists, in a vote of 413 to 63. The next day, the Senate took up the bill and voted it into law without any discussion, with the unanimous support of the 263 senators present.

The text of this first law significantly altered several articles of the Freedom of the Press law of 28 July 1881. It no longer respected the principles of liberal law. Whereas the original press law condemned direct incitement to commit crimes, this new law condemned indirect incitement, or apology, for example, of terrorism—a relatively vague category left to the judges' discretion. It also increased the penalties for all previously punishable acts and now allowed for preventative arrests and seizures of propaganda material, simply upon a judge's request.

==== Second law (December 1893) ====
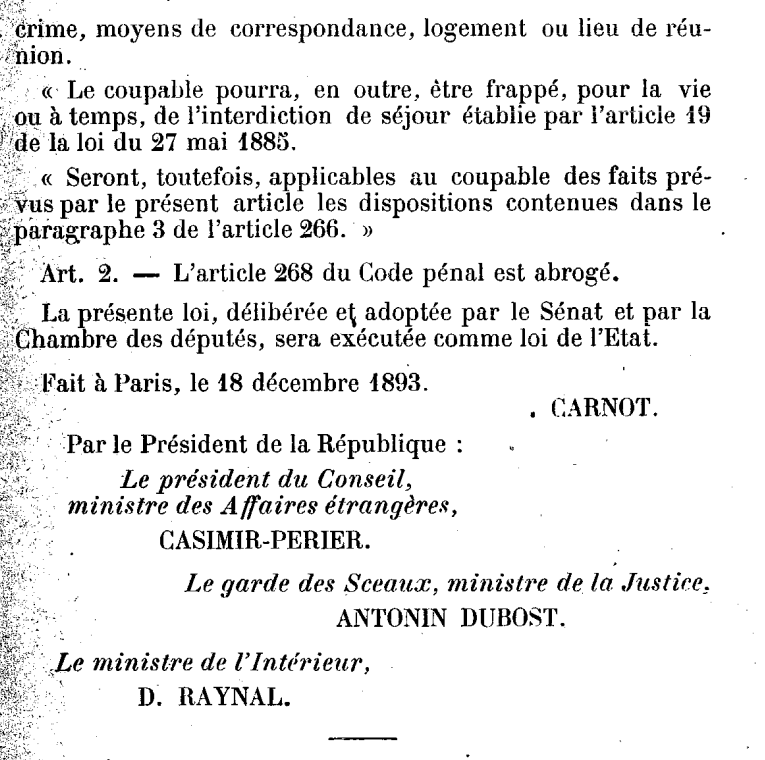
Excerpt and end of the second villainous law

The second law followed a similar legislative path. It was drafted and filed just two days after the bombing and began to be debated on the 15th. Dubost defended it by stating that it was about giving the government the means 'to definitely finish with' the anarchists, and that this second law would make it possible. Once again, socialist deputies tried to slow down the procedure and proposed amendments to make the text less problematic, but all were rejected. After 45 minutes of discussion, the law was adopted with 406 votes against 39. In the Senate, on 18 December, the law was adopted without even a discussion, with the unanimous vote of the 263 senators present.

This second law was even more problematic from the perspective of French criminal law. While the law stipulated that a "guilty act can only be punished when it has been manifested by a precise act of execution," this new law introduced a new crime: the 'understanding'. The definition of understanding was not precise, and the socialists' amendments aimed to make it more specific, for example, by applying the definition given to a conspiracy. The rejection of these amendments kept the law on its original path. While the government maintained that only understandings to commit criminal acts would be punished, such a characterization was complex and open to broad interpretation.

==== Interval (December 1893 – July 1894) ====
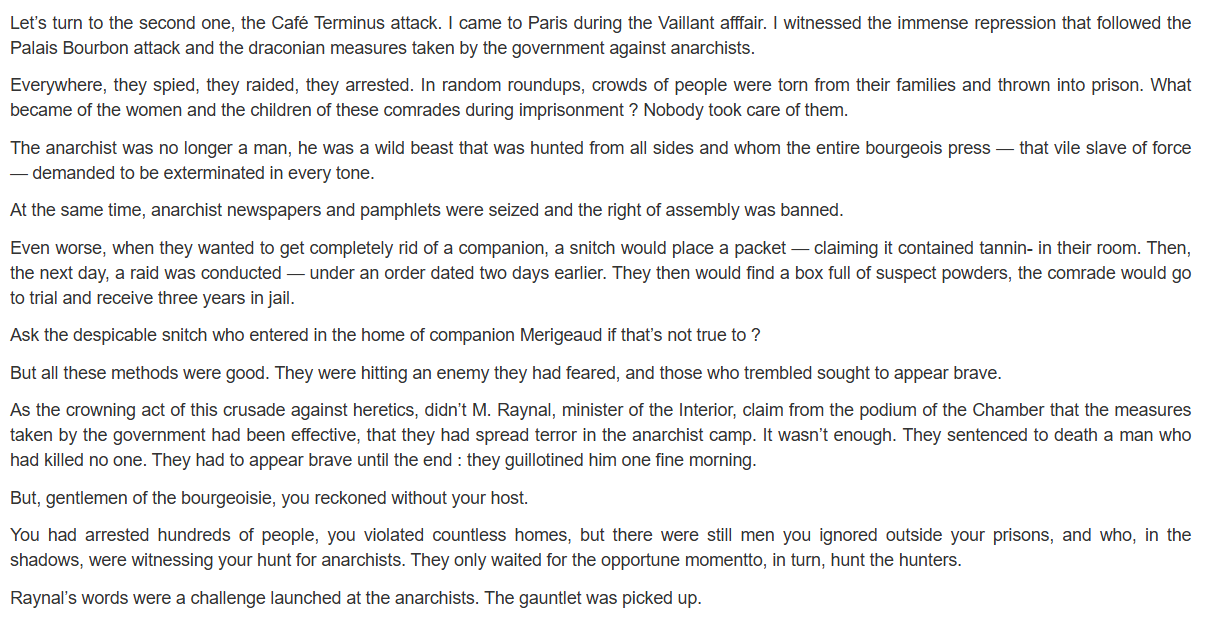
Excerpt of Émile Henry declaration at his trial, speaking about the repression of January and February 1894 and the laws as the main motives behind the Café Terminus bombing

Starting in early January 1894, France launched a vast crackdown on anarchists, leading to thousands of arrests, raids, and repressive measures. In some cases, authorities used illegal methods, such as planting false evidence in the homes of anarchists they wanted to imprison before conducting a raid. However, overall, this campaign failed to uncover caches of weapons or explosives. It also had the unintended effect of radicalizing the anarchists who escaped, often the most dangerous ones, pushing them to resume their attacks.

The third villainous law, intended to be even harsher than the first two, was being drafted during the first part of 1894. The French state was also involved in troubled activities during this period, likely being behind the Foyot bombing, a false flag anarchist bombing possibly designed to legitimize the vote on the third villainous law.

==== Third law (28 July 1894) ====
At the end of June 1894, President Sadi Carnot, the main person responsible for the repression, was assassinated in Lyon by the Italian companion Sante Caserio, who stabbed and killed him. This assassination caused a significant shock in France and allowed the deputies to pass the third villainous law, once again by a large majority.

This third law prohibited any anarchist or anti-militarist activity and any public propaganda of such ideas.

=== Trial of the Thirty ===
As an example of the effectiveness of the villainous laws, French authorities rounded up dozens of anarchists, thirty of whom (including five who were then in exile) were put on trial for criminal conspiracy. The trial mixed prominent figures of anarchism in France such as Jean Grave with less radical activists and illegalists, a number of whom were from the Ortiz gang.

Contrary to expectations, the judges in charge of the trial were not convinced by the prosecutors' arguments, which attempted to prove a criminal conspiracy among people who, for the most part, had never even met. The jurors acquitted nearly all of the defendants, with the exception of those in exile and three illegalists, Paolo Chiericotti, Léon Ortiz and Orsini Bertani. Émile Pouget, who received a heavy sentence while in London, returned the following year and was acquitted on appeal.

== Aftermath and legacy ==
=== Application and effectiveness ===
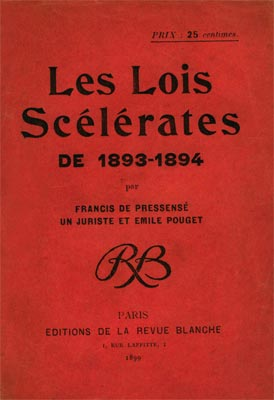
Les Lois Scélérates de 1893-1894 - cover of the book by de Pressensé, Pouget and Blum

The effectiveness of the "lois scélérates" is a subject of debate among historians. Instead of stopping anarchist attacks, the laws may have intensified them by radicalizing those who were not caught. The legal categories introduced by the laws were often vague and difficult to apply in trials. For example, of these debates, while the historian Jean Maitron contended that the first villainous law had a significant impact on the anarchist press of the era, Vivien Bouhey argues that this impact was limited. Bouhey's position is based on the fact that many anarchist newspapers were already being banned after only a few issues, even before the new laws were passed.

In 1899, Francis de Pressensé, member of the Human Rights League, Émile Pouget and Léon Blum, future French president, revisited the application of these laws. They documented several legal cases where state repression, based on these laws, targeted anarchists. Their findings showed that the laws were indeed responsible for a significant crackdown, particularly the second and third laws, which often used vague criteria to hand down harsher sentences.

=== Criticisms ===
Immediately after the laws were passed, they were opposed by a number of politicians, generally socialists. Jean Jaurès, a key figure in the French Socialist Party, spoke out and gave a speech against these laws. While he distanced himself from the anarchists, he opposed the adoption of the laws. Jaurès echoed the arguments of anarchist Jean Grave, who maintained that the best way to stop the attacks was to reduce poverty, which would naturally lead to an end of such acts.

The critiques from Blum, de Pressensé, and Pouget gave the entire set of laws the name of Lois scélérates, and they have been known by this name ever since.

=== Partial repeal in 1992 of third law ===
Only the Law of 28 July 1894, which explicitly targeted anarchist activities, was repealed on 1 March 1994 with the entry into force of Article 372 of the law relating to the institution of the new Penal Code, which was voted on 16 December 1992.

=== Enduring measures ===
Since 2014, the offenses criminalized in the first villainous law (apology of terrorism, among others) are punishable under Article 421-2-5 of the Penal Code. It is now subject to the standard criminal procedure, and its scope has been extended. The offense is no longer limited to the press; it now includes behaviors, actions, speeches, written materials, or images disseminated publicly, regardless of the medium used.

== Primary sources ==
- First loi scélérate (12 December 1893)
- Second loi scélérate (18 December 1893)
- Third loi scélérate (29 July 1894)

== Bibliography ==
- Bach Jensen, Richard (2015). The Battle against Anarchist Terrorism: An International History, 1878–1934. Cambridge: Cambridge University Press (CUP). ISBN 978-1-107-03405-1.
- Bantman, Constance (2014), "« Anarchistes de la bombe, anarchistes de l'idée » : les anarchistes français à Londres, 1880-1895" ['Bomb anarchists, idea anarchists': French anarchists in London, 1880-1895], Le Mouvement Social (in French), 246 (1), Paris: 47–61, doi:10.3917/lms.246.0047
- Bouhey, Vivien (2008), Les Anarchistes contre la République [The Anarchists against the Republic] (in French), Rennes: Presses universitaires de Rennes (PUR), ISBN 9782753507272
- Chambost, Anne-Sophie (2017), "" Nous ferons de notre pire… ". Anarchie, illégalisme … et lois scélérates" [«We’ll Do our Worse». Anarchy, Illegalism … and Evil Law], Droit et Cultures (in French), 74 (2): 65–87, doi:10.4000/droitcultures.4264
- Eisenzweig, Uri (2001). Fictions de l'anarchisme [Fictions of anarchism] (in French). France: C. Bourgois. ISBN 2-267-01570-6.
- Jourdain, Edouard (2013). L'anarchisme [Anarchism] (in French). Paris: La Découverte. ISBN 978-2-7071-9091-8.
- Merriman, John M. (2016). The dynamite club: how a bombing in fin-de-siècle Paris ignited the age of modern terror. Yale University Press. ISBN 978-0-300-21792-6.
- Oriol, Philippe (1993). À propos de l'attentat Foyot [à Paris] : quelques questions et quelques tentatives de réponse [About the Foyot bombing [in Paris]: some questions and some attempts at answers] (in French). Paris: Au Fourneau. ISBN 978-2-86288-400-4.
- de Pressensé, Francis; Pouget, Émile (1899), Les lois scélérates de 1893-1894 (PDF) (in French), Paris: La Revue Blanche – via Bibliothèque nationale de France Gallica
- Ward, Colin (2004). Anarchism: A Very Short Introduction. Oxford University Press (OUP). ISBN 0-19-280477-4.
