= Law of Three Years =

French Law regarding military service

Xth legislative Chamber of the French Third Republic
- Territorial extent: France
- Enacted by: Xth legislative Chamber of the French Third Republic
- Enacted: August 7, 1913
- Commenced: August 8, 1913
- Introduced by: Louis Barthou

Summary
- Law of August 7, 1913, amending the laws governing the infantry, cavalry, artillery and engineers, concerning unit strength, and setting the conditions for active army recruitment and the duration of service in the active army and its reserves.
- Status: Amended

The Law of Three Years was a French law passed in 1913 to increase the length of military service from two to three years, in order to prepare the French army for a possible war with Germany, which would occur the following year and become World War I.

Since the Tangier crisis (1905) and the Agadir crisis (1911), conflict appeared increasingly inevitable in the eyes of some public opinion, while the nationalist right and part of the republican left demanded revenge against the victor of 1870. Nevertheless, a whole section of the left, from the Radical Socialists to the SFIO, opposed it, in the name of antimilitarism and diplomatic negotiations with Germany to ward off the threat of war. The law was thus one of the major debates of 1913.

== Debates ==
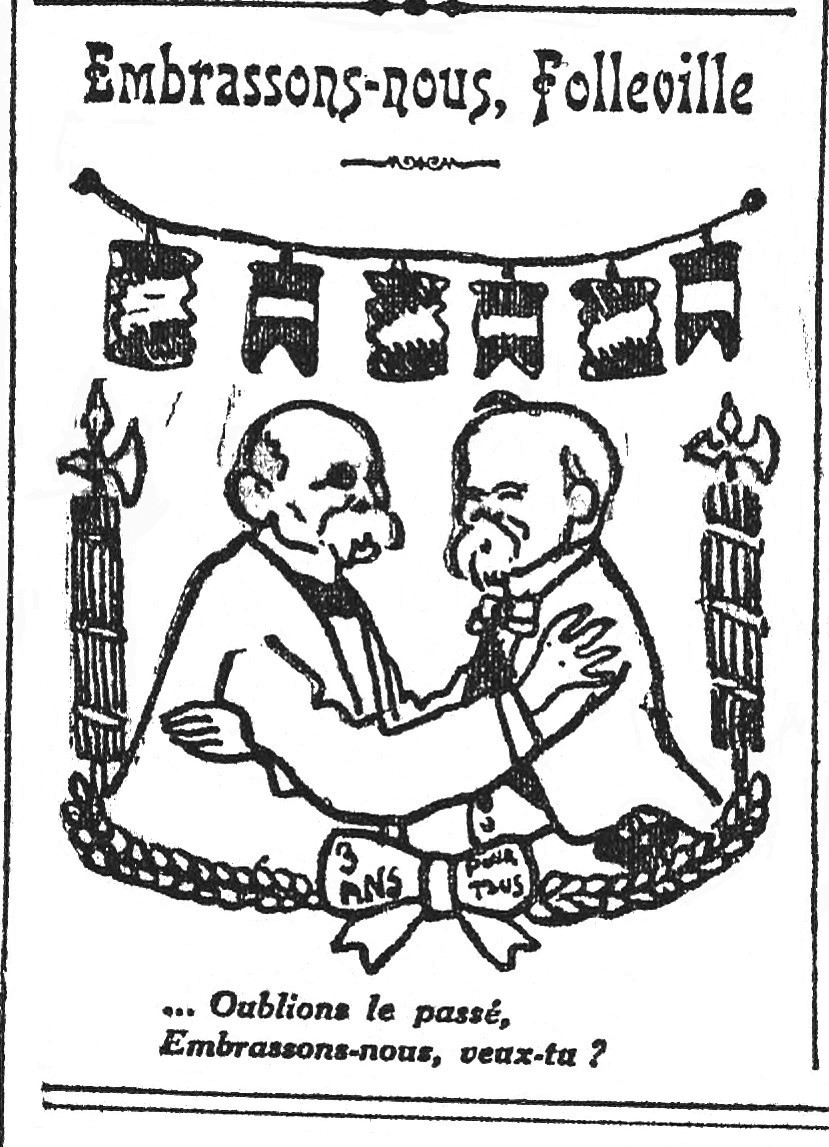
Embrassons-nous, Folleville ! (Let's kiss, Folleville!) « Oublions le passé… Embrassons-nous, veux-tu ? » (“Let's forget the past... Let's embrace, shall we?”) Cartoon from L'Humanité published on May 27, 1913, showing radical Senator Clemenceau and President Poincaré reconciled in joint support for the Law of Three Years.

The bill had first seen the light of day under the Briand cabinet. Once this was overthrown, it was reintroduced by the Barthou government, with the support of the President of the Republic, Raymond Poincaré.

While the SFIO socialists were opposed to the law, the radical Senator Clemenceau supported it. Although far removed from revanchism, he had been particularly concerned about the outbreak of war with Germany since the Tangier crisis of 1905. In his newspaper L'Homme libre, he constantly warned public opinion of the danger posed by the German threat (“Pour la défense nationale”, May 21, 1913; “Vouloir ou mourir”, May 24; “Ni défendus ni gouvernés”, July 15, etc.).

On May 23, 1913, Poincaré received Clemenceau at the Élysée Palace: this sign was intended for the Chamber of Deputies, warning that if it overthrew the government, Clemenceau, rather than Joseph Caillaux, would be appointed President of the Council. L'Humanité got angry, and published a cartoon mocking the reconciliation between these two adversaries.

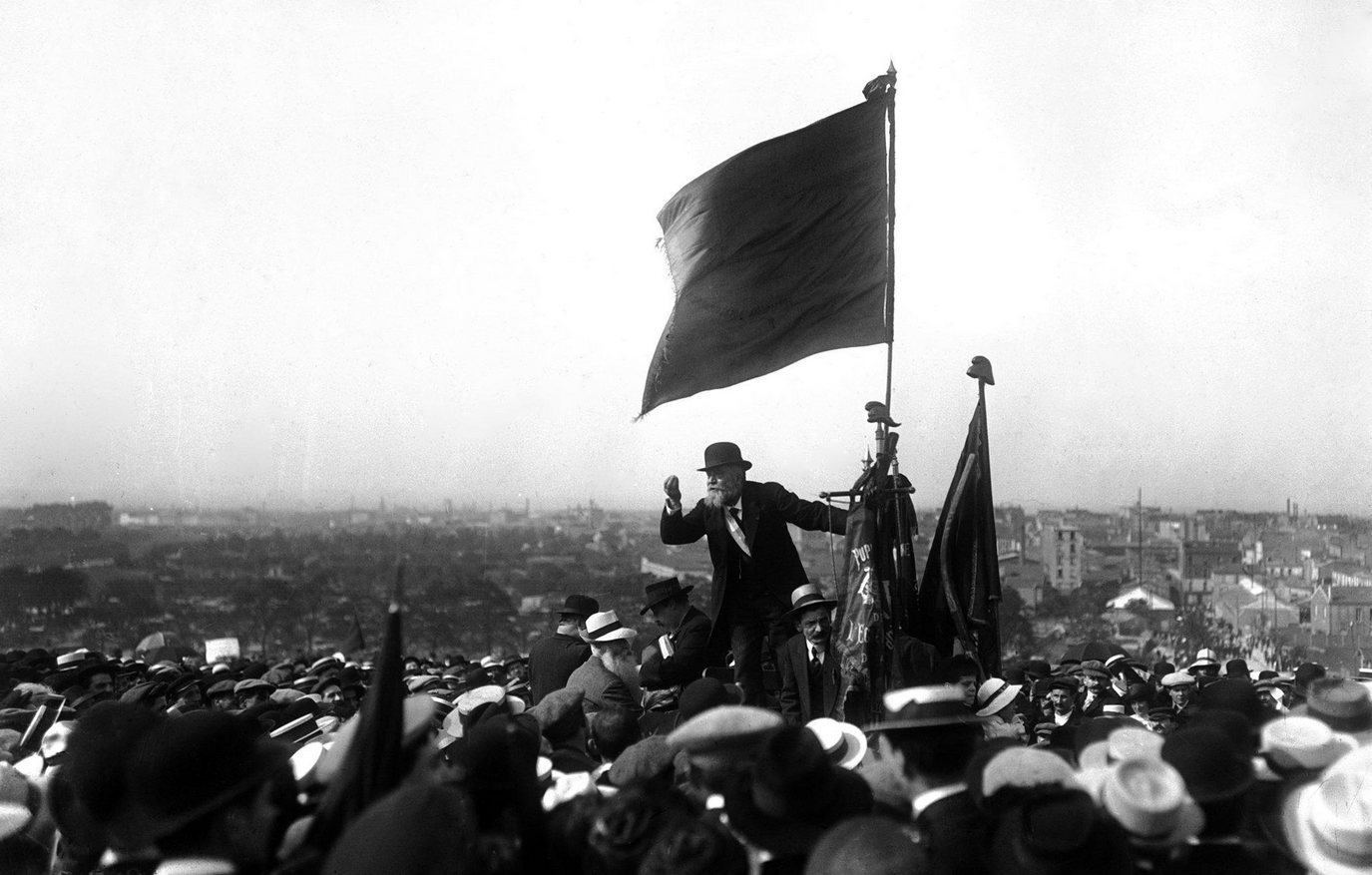
Speech by Jaurès at Pré-Saint-Gervais, during the demonstration against the Law of Three Years, on May 25, 1913.

SFIO deputy and pacifist Jean Jaurès was resolutely opposed to the law, relying on workers' internationalism to prevent the outbreak of war, while preferring a diplomatic and long-term solution for Alsace-Lorraine. On May 25, 1913, the SFIO organized a demonstration against the law at Le Pré-Saint-Gervais, attended by between 70,000 (according to Clemenceau's L'Homme libre) and 150,000 (according to L'Humanité), with dozens of speakers, including Jaurès. At the time, antimilitarism was widely shared on the left, partly because of the constant use of the French armed forces to suppress strikes (Draveil in 1908, Languedoc in 1907, etc.). Jaurès defended an alternative proposal, aimed at setting up citizen militias (see below).

== Unrest in the barracks ==
When conscripts of the 1911 class learned that their time of service was to be extended by a year without delay, discontent was rife. From Toul to Rodez, a wave of unrest swept through French barracks between May 18 and 24. Soldiers protested, sang The Internationale, jostled officers and sometimes tried to leave the barracks collectively.

General Paul Pau, in charge of the investigation, attributed this movement to the anti-militarist action of the CGT and anarchists, who strongly opposed the new law. What followed was a wave of searches and arrests in revolutionary circles, the imprisonment of some twenty CGT leaders and a trial in early 1914. Some, like linguist Paul Passy, founder of the Union of Christian socialists, lost their professorships because of their involvement in the protest campaign.

== Vote on the Law ==
The bill was debated in the Chamber of Deputies from June 2, 1913. It was passed on July 19, 1913, by 358 votes to 204, with the support of the Right wing against two-thirds of the Radical-Socialist deputies and the SFIO. The bill was then debated in the Senate, from July 31 to August 7, at a time when the Balkans were at war again. With Paul Doumer as rapporteur, the Senate voted overwhelmingly in favor.

Other proposals were discarded: some advocated 30 months' service rather than 36, or even 20 months (Louis Briquet's proposal), while Jaurès advocated a kind of militia theory, close to the Swiss example: 18 months' service, one day of exercise per month for young people aged 17 to 21, two days of maneuvers for reservists per trimester, and, from October 1916, one year's service, then six months in October 1918.

== Consequences ==
The repeal of the Law of Three Years was one of the themes of the April-May 1914 legislative campaign.

The Law increased the number of French soldiers from 480,000 to 750,000, while the German army was 850,000 strong. New regiments were created, such as the 49th artillery regiment. Armament, however, remained old-fashioned.

Conservative Catholic deputy Albert de Mun, committed defender of the law, joined the Finance Committee to defend its application, supporting the plan to borrow 1,400 million francs for this purpose.

== See also ==
- French Third Republic
- Sacred Union
- World War I
