= Bourse du Travail =

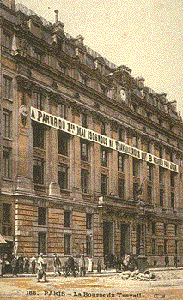
The Paris Bourse du Travail, May 1st 1906.

Poster announcing the 1893 Nantes Bourse du Travail founding.

The Bourse du Travail (French for "labour exchanges"), a French form of the labour council, were working class organizations that encouraged mutual aid, education, and self-organization amongst their members in the late nineteenth and early twentieth centuries.

== Role ==
=== Labour ===
Early Third Republic France was a time of dramatic social and economic change. With the tremendous growth of industrial capitalism in the last twenty years of the 19th century and the continued migration of workers to cities, the traditional system of meeting places for those seeking work was overtaxed. Skilled and unskilled trades alike had gradually developed systems to match those seeking work with employers, but the legalisation of trades unions in 1884, helped formalise these structures. Employers, too, were creating private labour placement offices.

The Republican government of Gambetta relied upon the support of working class voters, and so helped create the first Bourses du Travail under the control of newly legalised labour unions. Socialists and radicals, elected to city offices in some areas, made the funding of Bourses du Travail a priority. As the system expanded, radicals in local government extended aid. The loi du 14 mars 1904 mandated that every city of over ten thousand inhabitants had to create a bureau de placement, establishing job offices and undercutting employer run placement agencies. These government offices were usually placed in the local Bourses du Travail.

With government support came government regulation. While there was no legal obligation for the state or the municipality to put in place these buildings, their construction helped both the workers' movement and surveillance of its activities. Business interests and the police saw the formalisation of Bourses du Travail as a way to channel the labour movement away from revolutionary change or to keep an eye on those who promoted it.

=== Role in revolutionary ideology ===
The ideology behind the explosion in Bourses du Travail, popularized by revolutionary syndicalists like Fernand Pelloutier, intended to create in them the key organizational component of radical economic transformation. By acting as future co-ordinating bodies, facilitating communication between syndicates (unions), the Bourse du Travail would co-ordinate production and consumption in the absence of both the state and the private ownership of the means of production. These institutions were central to the notion of Revolutionary Syndicalism which dominated the Confédération Générale du Travail, France's largest labor federation in the first twenty years on the 20th century. Pelloutier and other revolutionary syndicalists argued that the Bourses—small scale, local, self made—were the guarantee that the CGT would remain both directly democratic and revolutionary. They saw labor organizations as interconnecting in three ways: a national federation uniting each specific union (traditional craft or trade unions); a national federation of all unions (in this case, the CGT); and all local workers, across union and political boundaries, united in the Bourse du travail. Supporters of the Bourse movement believed this structure last should become the most important form of workers' association.

=== Cultural ===
The other major change of this period was the Republican promulgation of Laic laws, taking education out of the hands of the Catholic church, and eventually taxing and regulating Church institutions. Bourses du Travail, like civil marriage or lay funerals, filled a communal role once played by local parishes.

Bourses du Travail were centres of working class culture. Almost every one contained lending libraries, classrooms, meeting halls, and theatres. Family and community celebrations took place here (away from the church), as did classes and political discussions, formal meetings and light entertainment. The Bourses du Travail buildings are still often the locations of theatres and concert venues.

== History ==
=== Birth in the Third Republic ===
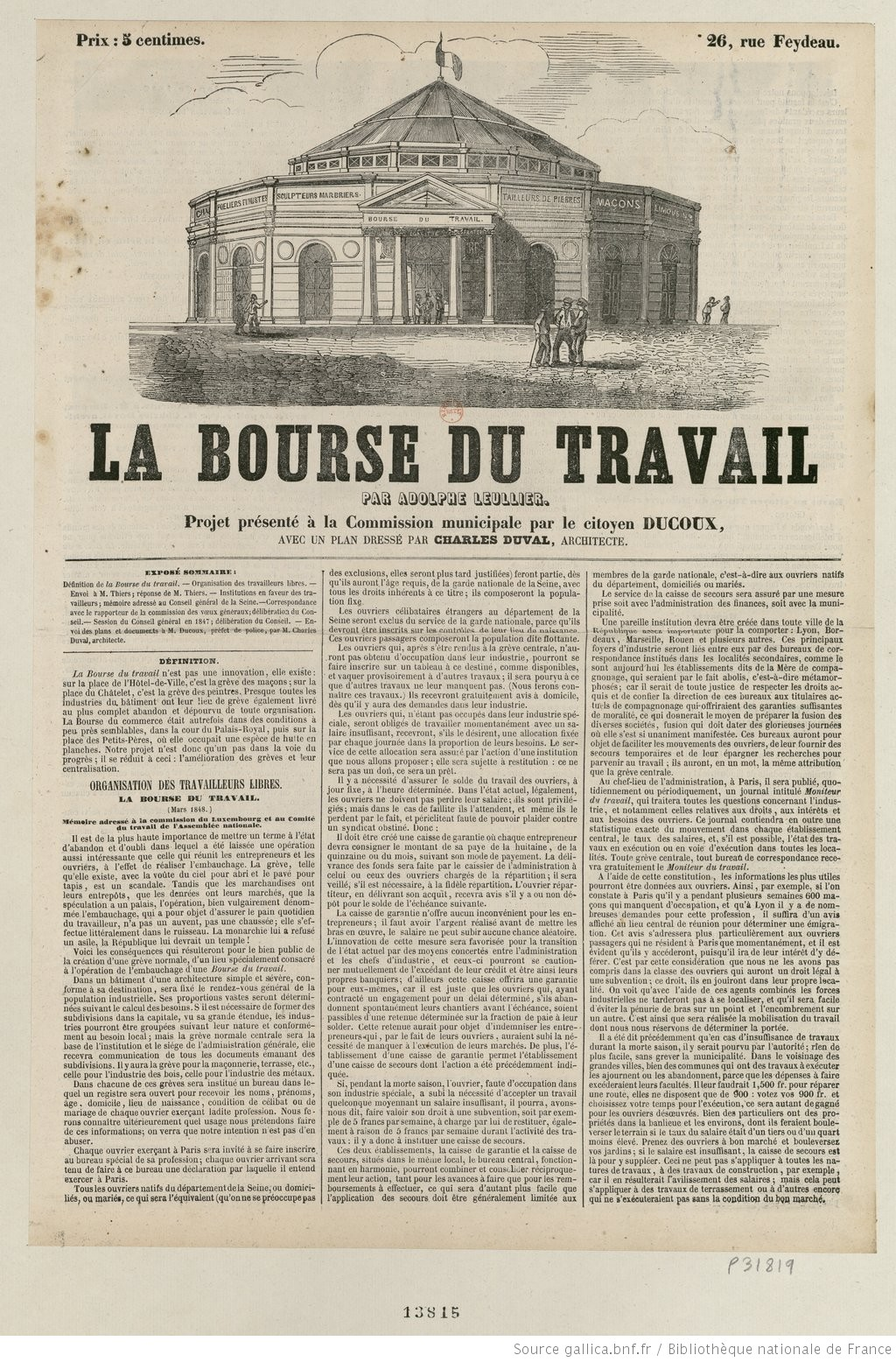
La Bourse du Travail Ducoux (1851)

A women's convention at the Troyes Bourse, c. 1900

Sign in sheet at the Aubusson Bourse, c. 1920.

The idea of French labour exchanges far predates the institution. In 1790, at the height of the French Revolution, an abortive Bourse du Travail was established in Paris. The loi Le Chapelier of 1791 outlawed this and any other labour organisation, and despite the brief legalisation during the Second Republic, unions remained illegal until 1884. Adolphe Leullier presented in 1845 a similar project which he called the Bureau central des ouvriers.

The idea of creating a Labour Exchange (Bourse du travail) is credited to the economist Gustave de Molinari in 1845. In February 1851 François Joseph Ducoux submitted a bill to the Legislative Assembly that proposed to establish a state-run Labour Exchange in Paris. His project was also submitted to the Paris Municipal Commission. The project was abandoned, but later revived in 1875 and 1883 and eventually came into force in 1886.

In 1875, workers petitioned the Paris municipal council to establish a Bourse du Travail, which was rejected. Labour organisations had existed underground or by other names, but their new status led to an explosion of radical activity. The French Revolutionary tradition was evolving into the economic sphere of union organising, rather than the seizure of power (exemplified by Auguste Blanqui).

The first Bourse du Travail, in Paris, was begun in 1887. A building on rue JJ Rousseau was donated by the Socialist municipal council, and a second on rue du Château d’eau was created in 1892. By this time there were 14 Bourses du Travail established around France, by 1902 83, with a further 75 created by 1914.

=== Fédération des Bourses de travail and the CGT ===
See also fr:Confédération générale du travail, fr:Charter of Amiens and Anarcho-syndicalism

The Fédération des Bourses de travail (Federation of Labour Exchanges) was created in 1892 at the Congress of Saint-Etienne by Fernand Pelloutier to federate each city's workers' organisations. It was first led by Bernard Resset (1892), then Rieu Cordier, then Fernand Pelloutier (1895) and from 1901 to 1918 by Georges Yvetot.

The Federation of Labour Exchanges merged in 1895 with the Fédération nationale des syndicats (National Federation of Trade-Unions), which had been created in 1886, giving rise to the Confédération générale du travail (CGT), which was dominated by a revolutionary syndicalist strategy until 1921.

The Federation merged with the CGT in 1902.

Many of the leaders of the Bourse du Travail went on to lead the CGT, and the FBT was a co-equal partner with individual unions in the CGTs founding. Bourses have thus been called the mère des syndicat (the mother of unions) for their role.

Structurally, individual Bourses comprised the building itself (and its social, education, and other practical resources), and the Bourse as a council of local unions. Unions paid a fee to join the bourse, though CGT affiliated unions were often exempted, and sent representatives to regular meetings of all the local unions. The administration of the bourse was by elected representatives. Contrary to Pelloutier's vision, these representatives came from a variety of ideological backgrounds which both represented the local political leanings of unions, but also the wider political left in the area. In many towns there were socialist municipal councils and mayors, either in Jules Guesde's French Workers' Party, the Jauresin possibilists of the French Section of the Workers' International (SFIO), or independent reformers of the Briand group. This leaves aside the constellation of syndicalist focused socialists (like Jean Allemane's Revolutionary Socialist Workers' Party), cooperativists, and individualist anarchist workers who sometimes played active roles in their local Bourse. In most places anarcho-syndicalism was but one small faction in both the bourses and the CGT, and so the bourses took on roles of a reformist, or Marxist, or strictly trade unionist character which presaged the CGT split.

=== Rise of the PCF and decline of the Bourse ===
The birth of the French Communist Party began the decline of the Bourse du Travail movement. The CGT, which had regrouped the individual organisations, was swept up in the ideological tumult of the post war years. It became, like much of the French left, dominated by the Communists ideological vision, which saw the loose federalism of Revolutionary Syndicalism as a reason for the failure of the 1918-1919 strike wave. In 1921, the CGT revised its structure, eliminating the local Bourses du Travail as constituent organisation of the Union, and replacing them with a network of Unions Locales. From here on, the CGT followed a British and American model of local trade specific unions, federated into a single national structure.

A split, eventually into three federations, created a French Section of the Workers' International (SFIO)-dominated CGT, the United General Confederation of Labour (Confédération générale du travail - unitaire or CGTU), where communists cohabited with anarchists and revolutionary trade unionists, and the Revolutionary Trade Unionist General Confederation of Labour (Confédération générale du travail - syndicaliste révolutionnaire or CGTSR) in 1923 when the communists gained control of the CGTU. (The CGT and CGTU reunited in 1936, and remained close to the French Communist Party.) Predictably, these often bitter party divisions in the labor movement made the local and inclusive vision of the Bourses impossible.

The Bourses du Travail survived, often as a single organisation union hall, while the history of splits in the French labour movement saw the buildings pass from one hand to another, revert to municipalities, or disappear entirely.

== Today ==
=== Buildings and communities ===
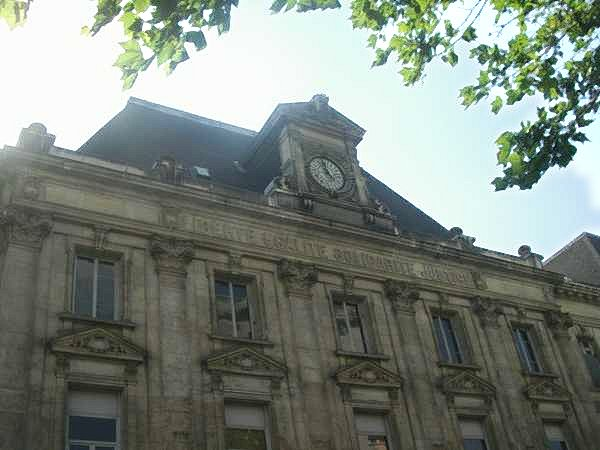
The Bourse du Travail building, Paris, 2005.

Bourse du Travail buildings and institutions remain in most large French cities. Many are headquarters of the local unions which are federated into the Confédération nationale du travail, or of other unions which split from the French Communist Party. Many bourses were central as places of organizing and resistance during May 1968. In some places municipal governments have retained ownership, or community and radical groups have taken them over. Some have simply been sold off for office space or torn down.

In Lille, one of the earliest bourses remains as the home of five unions and a radical community center, and came center stage in the resistance to the deportation of undocumented immigrants, when 460 sans-papiers staged a 30-day hunger strike to oppose government policies.

=== Ideology ===
The Bourse du Travail concept has been central to Anarcho-syndicalists across the globe, and the model greatly influenced Council communism and other forms of left communism. Anarchists of many stripes point to the Bourse du Travail as an example of a directly democratic, small scale federalist institutional structure.

== Outside France ==
The Bourse du Travail idea was exported along with French imperialism. The FBT's full name was actually Fédération des Bourses du Travail de France et des Colonies, though in practice this meant there were sections in the French settler dominated parts of Algeria. These declined with their French counterparts, and did not survive the anticolonial struggle.

In Subsaharan Africa, Bourses du Travail were implanted in two ways. In French controlled regions, labor unions were organized by the CGT in the 1930s and 1940s. Their labour halls were styled Bourses du travail, some of which remain as centers of union activity.

The rulers of Belgian Congo created a Bourse du travail at Katanga in 1910 as a state controlled hiring hall, in an attempt to lure labor to areas of planned industrial (mostly mining) concentration. Attempts by local officials to recast this cynically created employment agency into a more worker run operation suggest that the idea of a Bourse du travail never lost its syndicalist connotations.

== See also ==
- Labour council
- Popular education
- Workers' council

== Bibliography ==
=== Historical Works ===
- (in French) Daniel Colson. Bourse du Travail et syndicalisme d'entreprise avant 1914: les Acieries de Saint-Etienne in Le Mouvement social, No. 159 (Apr. - Jun., 1992), pp. 57–83.
- (in French) Paul Delesalle. Les Bourses du Travail et la C.G.T., Bibliothèque du mouvement prolétarien, 64 pages, Rivière, 1912.
- Robert Gildea. Review Article: La Vie quotidienne des anarchistes en France, 1880-1910 by Andre Nataf; Naissance des Bourses du travail. Un appareil ideologique d'Etat a la fin du XIXe siecle by Peter Schottler; Souvenirs d'un anarchiste by Maurice Joyeux; in The English Historical Review, Vol. 103, No. 409 (Oct., 1988), pp. 1000–1001.
- Patrick H. Hutton (ed.). Historical Dictionary of the Third French Republic, 1870-1940. University of Michigan (1986) p. 122 ISBN 0-313-22080-8
- (in French) Jean-Yves Martin. Aux origines de la Bourse du Travail de St-Nazaire de 1892 à la fin du siècle, in Cahier de l’AREMORS n°3 (1992)
- (in French) Fernand Pelloutier. Histoire des bourses du travail, (1901).
- (in French) Maurice Poperen. Creation des Bourses du Travail en Anjou 1892-1894 in Le Mouvement social, No. 40 (Jul. - Sep., 1962), pp. 39–55.
- (in French) Jean Sagnes. Le mouvement ouvrier en Languedoc: Syndicalistes et socialistes de l'Herault de la foundation des bourses du travail a la naissance du Parti communiste (Midi et son histoire). Privat(1980) ISBN 2-7089-8600-7
- (in French) Peter Schöttler. Naissance des Bourses du travail. Un appareil idéologique d'Etat à la fin du XIXe siècle. Presses universitaires de France (1985).
- Michael Seidman. The Birth of the Weekend and the Revolts against Work: The Workers of the Paris Region during the Popular Front (1936–38) in French Historical Studies, Vol. 12, No. 2 (Autumn, 1981), pp. 249–276.
- (in French) Danielle Tartakowsky. Review article: Bourses du travail et federations d'industrie. Trois etudes in Le Mouvement social, No. 178, France-Belgique Fin de Siecle (Jan. - Mar., 1997), pp. 150–151.

=== Online Resources ===
- (in French) Fernand Pelloutier's Histoire des Bourses du travail, the complete text, online at pelloutier.net (accessed 28-06-2007). Also at on anarkhia.org, and with biographic information and documents on kropot.free.fr
- (in French) Pierre Besnard. Bourse du Travail Encyclopédie anarchiste. 13 April 2005.
- (in French) à la Bourse du Travail Fr:Wikipedia on Anarchist Bourse du Travail in the 1930s
- (in French) des bourses du travail Fr:Wikipedia list of Bourse du Travail
- (in French) Loi relative à la création des syndicats professionnels du 21 mars 1884
- (in French) Association Bourse du Travail Mémoire Vivante, Troyes
- 1982 Film on the history of la Bourse du Travail de Paris
- (in French) FERNAND PELLOUTIER et les Bourses du Travail: Documentary Film.
- (in French) Timeline and history of the Bourse dutravail of Saint-Etienne.

=== In Francophone Africa ===
- (in French) Albert Ayache. Essai sur la vie syndicale en Algerie, l'annee du Centenaire (1930) in Le Mouvement social, No. 78, Special Issue: Le Mouvement Ouvrier Francais et l'Afrique du Nord. (Jan. - Mar., 1972), pp. 95–114
- Aldwin Roes. The Bourse du Travail du Katanga: ?A parastatal recruitment organisation with monopsonistic powers?? State-capital relations in the mobilization of Katanga?s labour power, 1910-1914. London School of Economics, (2007)
- (in French) Guy Bertrans Wonkam La grève au Labogenie préoccupe la Cstc in Le Quotidien Mutations (Yaoundé), 16 December 2003.

=== Further reading ===
- (in French) A Bourse du Travail bibliography from the University of Nantes: Centre d'histoire du travail

== Some operating Bourses du Travail ==
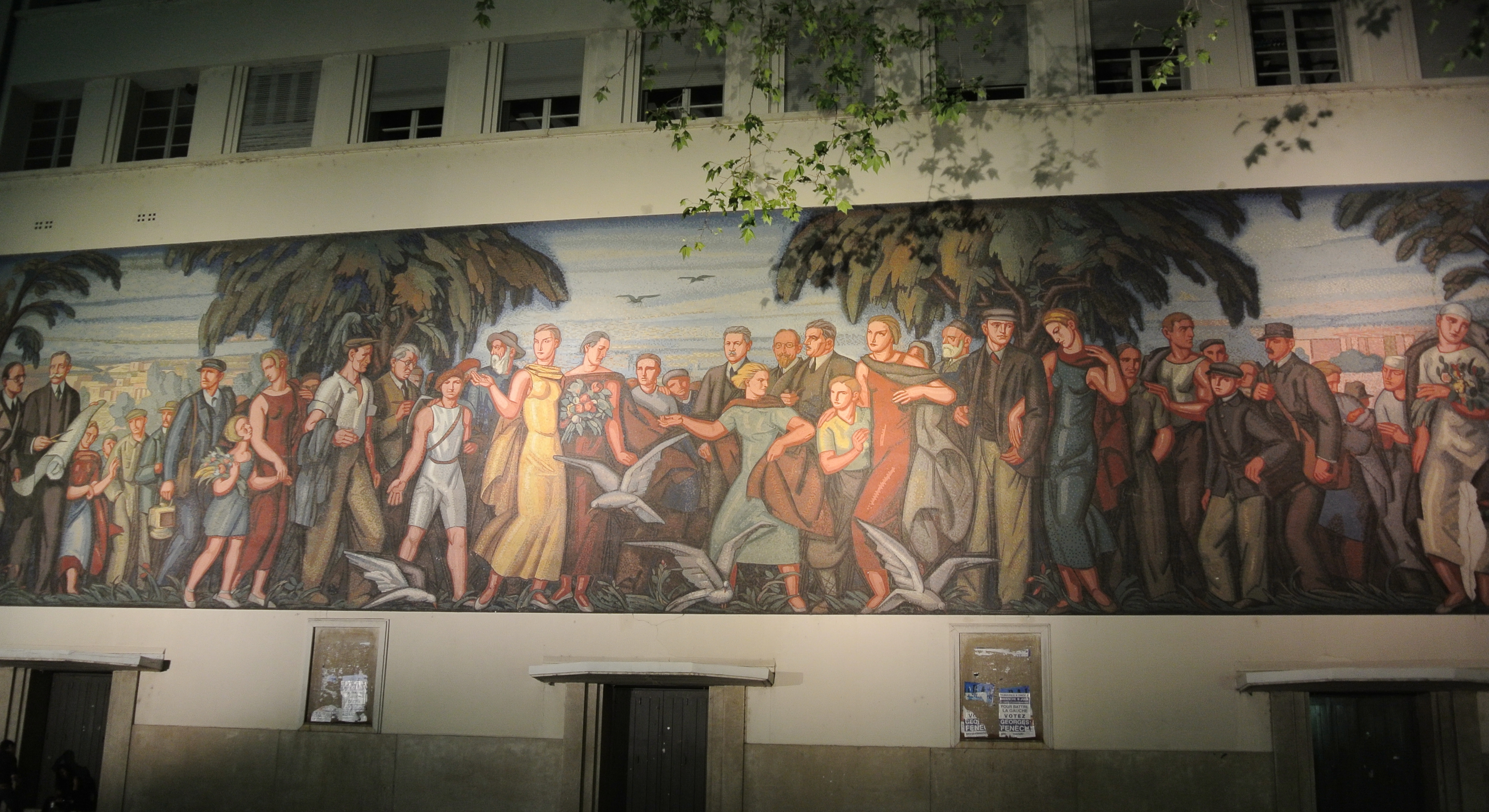
Fresco on the western facade of the Bourse du travail of Lyon

Lyon
Bourse du travail
3 ème Arr. Métro B-Station Place Guichard.

Paris (château d'Eau)
Bourse du Travail
3 rue du château d'Eau - Métro République.

Angers
Bourse du Travail
14, place Louis Imbach
49000 Angers

Creil
Bourse du travail
rue Fernand Pelloutier
60100 Creil

Bordeaux
Bourse du Travail
44, cours Aristide Briand
33000 Bordeaux
