= Charter of Amiens =

The Charter of Amiens (French: Charte d'Amiens) was adopted at the 9th Congress of the Confédération générale du travail (CGT) French trade-union, which took place in Amiens in October 1906. Its main proposal was the separation between the union movement and the political parties. The CGT was then dominated by anarcho-syndicalists who preferred the constitution of an alternate system through the elaboration of workers' unions rather than moderate reforms through the electoral path. The motion for the Charter was drafted by Victor Griffuelhes, general secretary of the CGT, and Émile Pouget. The Charter was adopted by 830 participants, eight having voted "no" and one abstained, and marked the victory of the current of revolutionary syndicalism in the CGT of the time.

== Aims ==
The Charter of Amiens assigned two aims to the workers' movement: the "defense of immediate and daily demands" and the "struggle for a global transformation of society in complete independence from political parties and from the state." By this Charter, the CGT explicitly recognized class struggle. Immediate goals included reduction of worktime (the 8 hours day) and increase of wages. But the longer-term goal was nothing less than "expropriation of the capitalists" through the means of a general strike. It considered the trade-union to be the future group of production and of social repartition and the basis for a social reorganization — a main view of the syndicalism movement.

== Legacy ==
The Charter of Amiens has become a cornerstone of the unions' tradition in France and the guarantee of their autonomy from political parties, although after World War II and the creation of the social-democrat Force Ouvrière (FO) trade-union, close to the French Section of the Workers' International (SFIO) and then to the French Socialist Party (PS), the CGT has maintained unofficial links with the French Communist Party (PCF). The CGT, FO, the Union nationale des syndicats autonomes (UNSA), the Union syndicale Solidaires, the Confédération nationale du travail (CNT), the FGAAC and the Fédération syndicale unitaire (FSU) today all claim as theirs the Charter of Amiens. The CNT-AIT, founded in 1922, is the only one to reject the Charter, alleging that by proclaiming an autonomy between trade-unions and political parties it organizes the submission of the workers' union to parties. Furthermore, the CNT-AIT — French section of the International Workers' Association (IWA) — which qualifies itself as an anarchist communist organization, also criticizes the formulation according to which the trade-union will become the future cell of social organization: in its views, in the event of an overhaul of Capitalism, the trade-unions will be called to disappear lest they become organizations of control.

== See also ==
- Trade unions in France
- History of the Left in France
- International Anarchist Congress of Amsterdam (1907, in particular Pierre Monatte's speech)
- Politics of France
- Anarchism in France
