= Edmond de Pressensé =

French Protestant religious leader

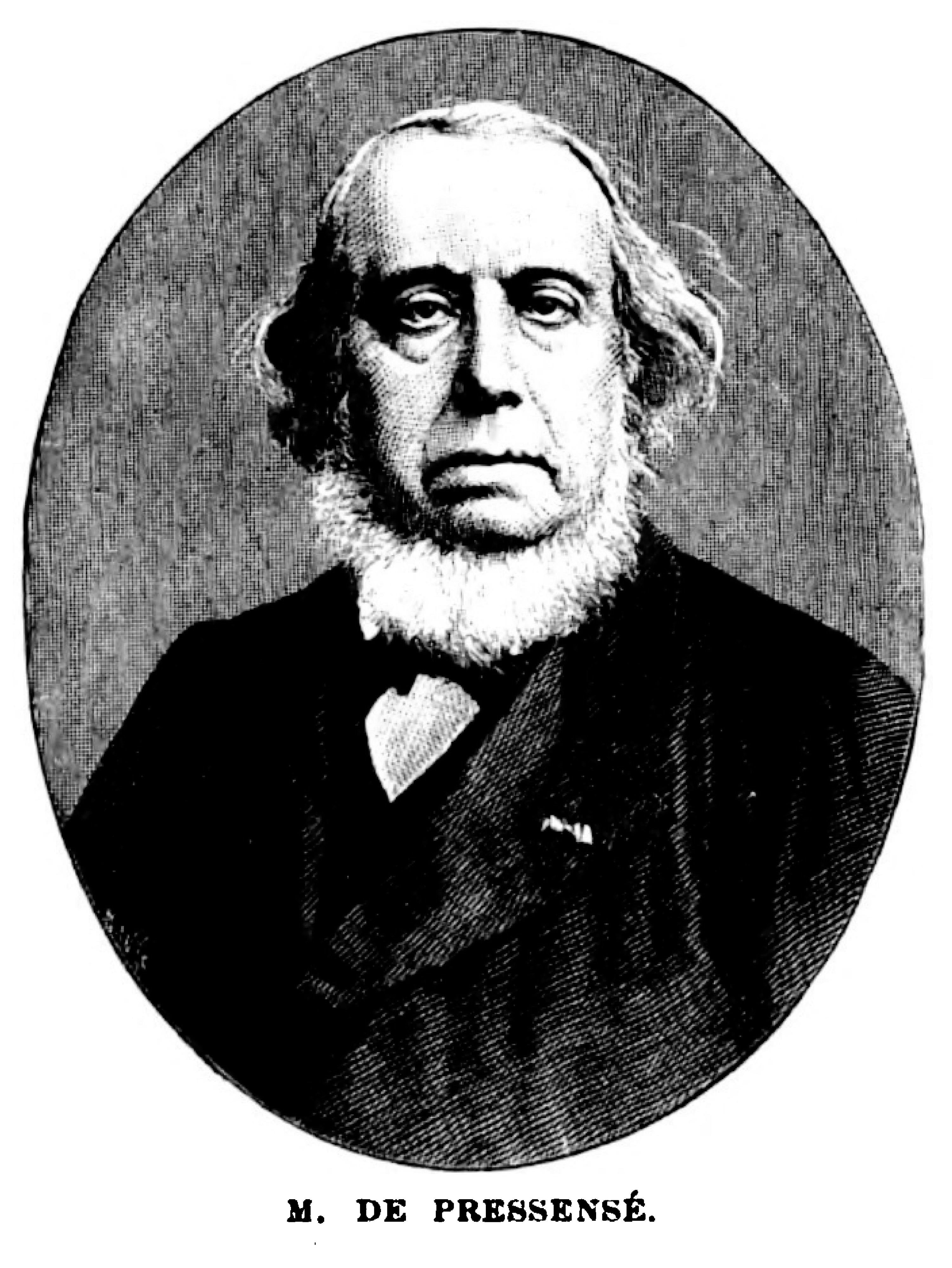

Edmond Dehault de Pressensé (7 January 1824 – 8 April 1891) was a French Protestant religious leader.

== Biography ==
He was born in Paris, and studied in Lausanne under Alexandre Vinet. He went on to the University of Halle as a pupil of Friedrich August Tholuck and to Humboldt University in Berlin, where he studied under August Neander. In 1847 he became a pastor in the Evangelical Church at the chapel of Taitbout in Paris.

He was a powerful preacher and political orator; from 1871 he was a member of the National Assembly, and from 1883 a life senator. In 1890 he was elected a member of the Académie des sciences morales et politiques. Pressensé laboured for the revival of biblical studies. He contended that the Evangelical Church ought to be independent of the power of the state.

His son Francis de Pressensé was a French politician and man of letters.

== Published works ==
In 1854 he founded the Revue chrétienne, and in 1866 the Bulletin idéologique. His works include:

- L'Immaculée conception: histoire d'un dogme Catholique-Roman (1855)
- Histoire des trois premiers siècles de l'Église chrétienne (6 volumes. 1856–1877; new edition 1887–1889)
- L'Église et la Révolution française (1864)
- Jésus-Christ, son temps, sa vie, son œuvre (against Ernest Renan, 1866)
- Les Origines, le problème de la connaissance; le problème cosmologique (1883)

Several of his works have been translated into English:

- The Immaculate Conception (1857) translated by Adolf Zytogorski
- Jesus Christ: his times, life, and work (1866) translated by Annie Harwood Holmden
- The early years of Christianity: a comprehensive history of the first three centuries of the Christian church (4 volumes, 1879) translated by Annie Harwood Holmden
- A Study of origins: or, the problems of knowledge, of being, and of duty (1883) translated by Annie Harwood Holmden
- The ancient world and Christianity (1888) translated by Annie Harwood Holmden
