= Victor Griffuelhes =

French socialist

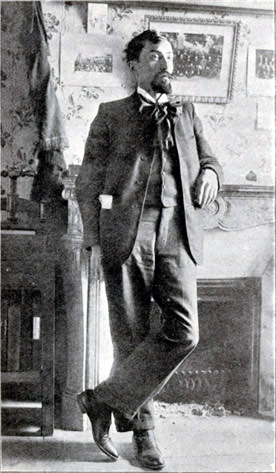
Victor Griffuelhes, 1906.

Victor Griffuelhes (French: [ɡʁifɥɛl]; 14 March 1874, Nérac – 30 June 1922, Saclas) was a French socialist and leader of the General Confederation of Labour (CGT) in France. He was drawn to anarcho-syndicalism and advocated the establishment of socialism through independent trade union action.

== Dreyfus affair ==
According to Zeev Sternhell, Griffuelhes, like Emile Pouget, has been indifferent to the Dreyfus Affair, seeing it as a bourgeois mystification to distract the people from true issues.

== Publications ==
- "Romantisme révolutionnaire", L'Action directe, no. 15, 23 April 1908
- L'Action syndicaliste, Bibliothèque du mouvement socialiste, IV, Librairie des sciences politiques et sociales, Paris, Marcel Rivière, 1908
- "Le syndicalisme révolutionnaire", La Publication sociale, coll. Bibliothèque d'études syndicalistes, no. 1, 1909
- "De 1899 à 1909 : la leçon du passé", La Vie ouvrière, no. 1, 5 October 1909
- "À propos d'un livre" (Comment nous ferons la Révolution, par Pataud et Pouget), La Vie ouvrière, no. 5, 5 December 1909
- With Louis Mercier-Vega, Anarcho-syndicalisme et syndicalisme révolutionnaire, Éditions Spartacus, Paris, 1978

== Bibliography ==
- Vandervort, Bruce (1996). Victor Griffuelhes and French Syndicalism 1895-1922. Louisiana State University Press. ISBN 0-8071-2045-6.
