= Le Père Peinard =

French anarchist newspaper

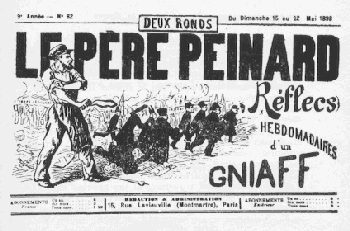
- Le Père Peinard (1898)
- Editor-in-chief: Émile Pouget
- Founded: 24 February 1889
- Ceased publication: 1902
- Political alignment: Anarchism; Anarcho-syndicalism; Feminism; Decolonization; Antimilitarism; Anti-clericalism; Illegalism; Propaganda by the deed
- Language: French
- Headquarters: Paris

Le Père Peinard was a weekly French anarchist newspaper founded in 1889. Its main author was also its founder, Émile Pouget, though other anarchists contributed as well. Alongside Le Révolté and l'Endehors, it was one of the three major publications during the golden age of anarchist press in France. Le Père Peinard stood out from its contemporaries by taking a more radical stance and focusing heavily on social issues.

The paper is seen as a forerunner of anarcho-syndicalism and addressed a wide range of topics, including feminism and anti-colonialism. Its frequent use of slang also provides valuable insight into the Parisian and anarchist cants of the time.

It was the first newspaper to systematically report on social unrest in France and to give significant attention to the struggles of rural communities in its political coverage.

== History ==
=== Context ===
Émile Pouget was a prominent figure in the anarchist movement in France. In 1879, he took part in the founding of one of the first employee unions in France. He was a friend and close associate of Louise Michel, and both were involved in a riot in Paris during which bakeries were looted. Pouget, attempting to free Michel from police custody by force, was arrested. He was sentenced to eight years in prison and incarcerated in Melun, but was released after three years due to an amnesty. Upon release, he remained as committed and radical as before.

For the legislative election of January 27, 1889, he published a poster titled Le Père Peinard au populo ('Father Chill to the people').

=== 1889-1894: First series (Paris) ===
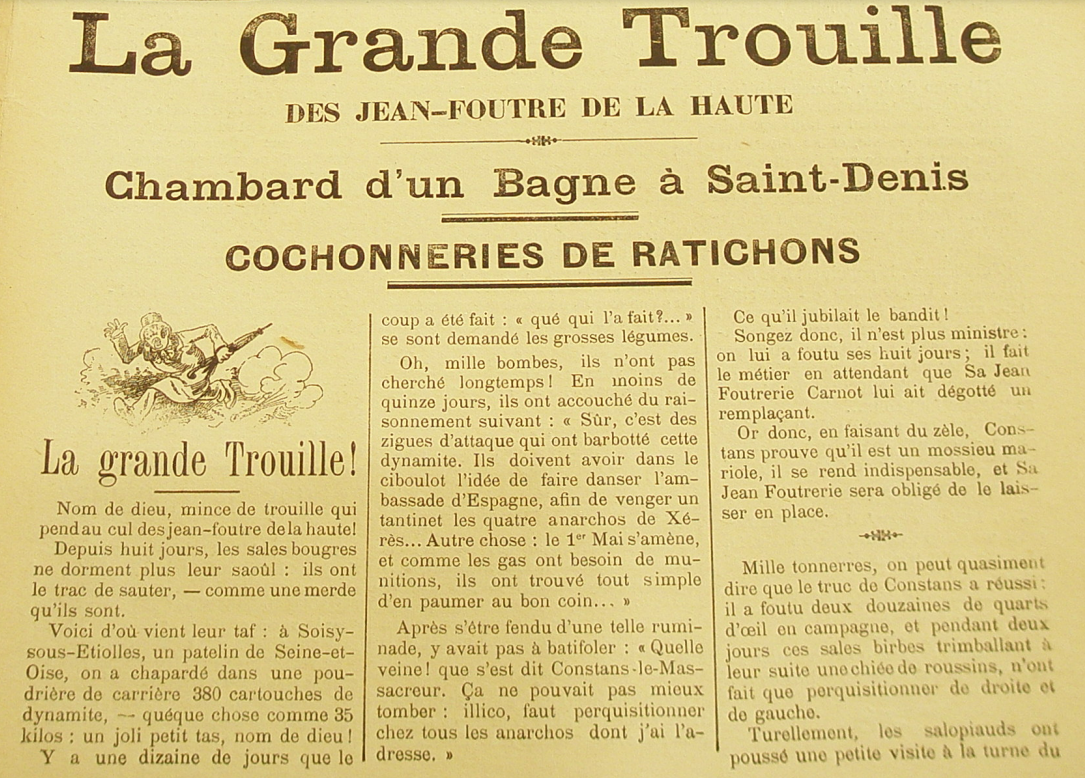
'The big fear of the wankers of the upper class', front page of Le Père Peinard, discussing the robbery of Soisy-sur-Seine.

On 24 February 1889, Pouget published the first issue of Le Père Peinard. The name of the newspaper was a reference to Le Père Duchesne, a radical journal from the French Revolution. Pouget concealed his identity behind a fictional character, Père Peinard ('Father Chill'), a Parisian shoemaker who offered his opinions on current events and commented on the news.

In general, Pouget took strong social positions, engaging with any topic he could address. He showed a particular interest in crime and sensational news stories, which Le Père Peinard regularly reported on and used. As the journal developed, Pouget’s views shifted increasingly toward a form of pre-revolutionary syndicalism, making Le Père Peinard a forerunner of the anarcho-syndicalist movement. It was also the first newspaper to consistently report on social unrest in France and to give significant attention in its political struggles to the rural population there. It quickly gained a significant following among French workers; many cities that had previously been outside the reach of anarchist ideas were now influenced by the widely read journal.

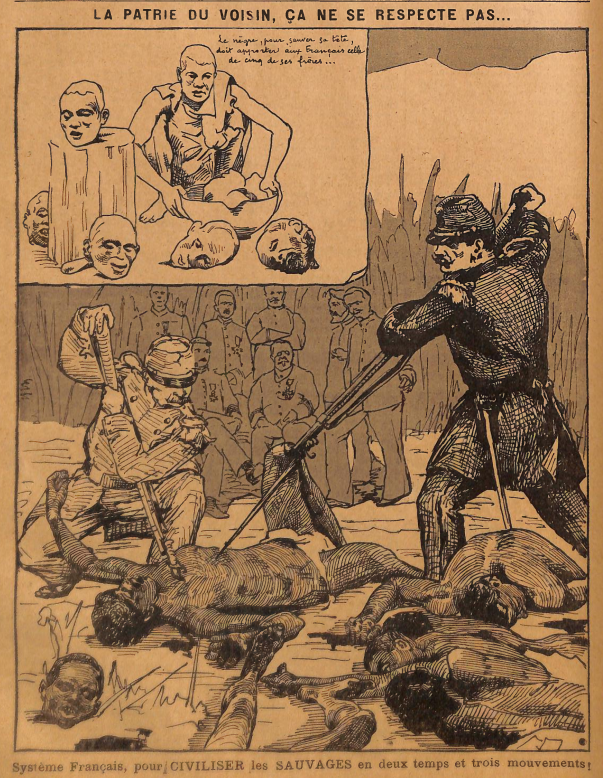
'French system to civilize the savages quickly', Le Père Peinard (26 April 1891)

Pouget was not the only contributor to the newspaper; he received provincial news from various anarchist correspondents, such as Edouard Guérdat from Lille and Pierre Narcisse from Toulouse. It is also likely that several of the paper’s managers participated in writing or editing articles. Émile Henry is also known to have contributed to the publication according to René Bianco. The illustrations were created by Maximilien Luce, Georges Manzana-Pissarro, Lucien Pissarro, Adolphe Willette, and Constant Marie.

Le Père Peinard took a far more radical stance than Le Révolté by Jean Grave and Peter Kropotkin—supporting the strategy of propaganda by the deed more strongly than these competitors, including l'Endehors. The paper fully endorsed anarchist attacks and actions as legitimate. These more radical perspectives boosted the paper’s sales, and, like l'Endehors, it became more widely read than Le Révolté, which was overtaken by its political moderation and read less by the base of anarchist militants. Historian Richard Sonn described Le Père Peinard as representing the social branch of French anarchist press at the time, in contrast to l'Endehors, which leaned toward artistic themes, and Le Révolté, which focused on theoretical content.

From its early months, during the Pini affair, Le Père Peinard was among the anarchist publications to defend the illegalist anarchist involved. The journal was very receptive to illegalist practices and encouraged similar actions, promoting theft and individual reclamation as forms of resistance against capitalism. State justice was a primary target of the periodical, which considered it essentially a "class justice", meaning an instrument used by the bourgeoisie to repress the proletariat and anarchists. In this context, it can be said that the anarchist publication explicitly put state justice on trial.

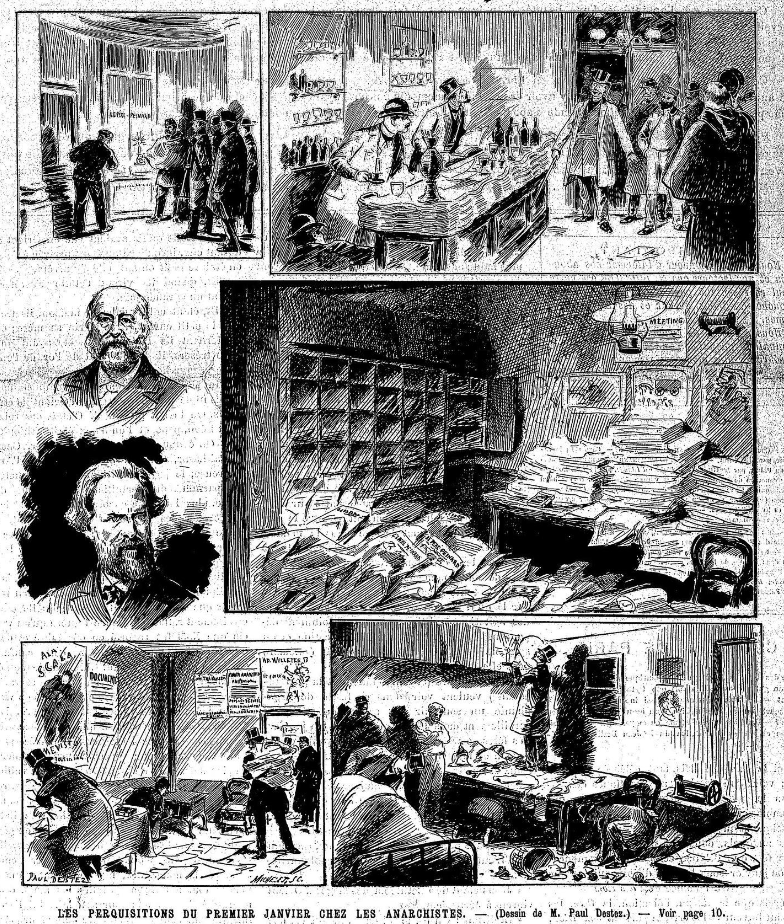
Depiction of the 1 January 1894 raids in L'Univers illustré (6 January 1894), showing police operations at anarchist locations including Le Père Peinard offices and Reclus brothers' portraits

Its editorial line was broad, engaging with nearly every social struggle of its time. Le Père Peinard was at once anti-clerical, anti-militarist, anti-colonial, and feminist. For example, in the article French Barbarity, the paper openly denounced colonization, called for revolt, and drew parallels between colonial repression and the oppression faced by workers and anarchists.

The newspaper was repeatedly raided and even ransacked by the police. During the repression of January and February 1894, it was once again targeted: the publication was raided, its stock destroyed, it was banned from sale in French Algeria, and then entirely banned in France.

=== 1894-1895: Second series (London) ===
During this time, Pouget took refuge in London, where he began publishing the London series, which included eight issues between 1894 and 1895. From there, Pouget immediately set out to resume the publication of the newspaper. He partnered with other anarchists in exile there—then a central hub for anarchist meetings and coordination—and restarted the publication.

The eight issues produced during this London series were in formats that differed greatly from the previous version of the journal. To avoid censorship by the French authorities, the newspaper was disguised within brochures that bore no resemblance to the usual appearance of Le Père Peinard and then smuggled into France. Moreover, the text never explicitly mentioned the name or the character Le Père Peinard.

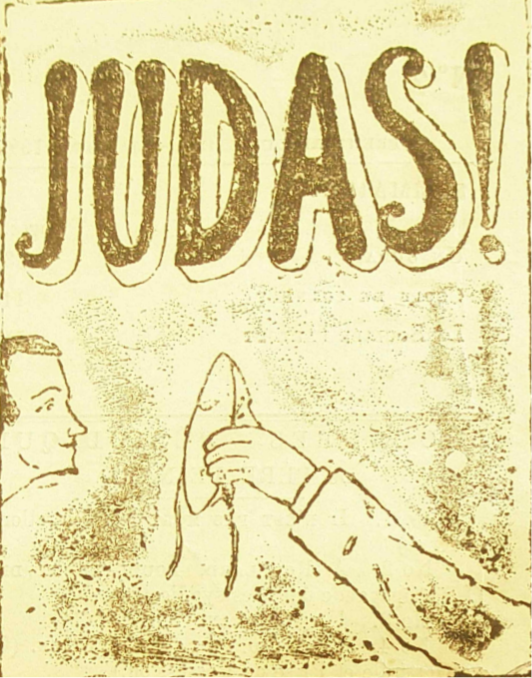
'Judas' depiction of Eugène Cotin being busted by London anarchists, a way for Le Père Peinard to introduce their A Judas! article (January 895 - London series)

In this London series, Pouget expressed even more clearly than before the internationalism that was one of his perspectives and turned even more toward revolutionary syndicalism. He also provided many practical tips to help fellow anarchists evade the authorities. In one issue, for instance, he detailed the confessions extracted from a French police informant, Eugène Cotin, who had been sent to spy on anarchists in London. This served as an introduction to share information about the tactics of both French and British police. He offered a range of details designed to serve as a manual for anarchists of the time—such as "spy payments, the types of information expected, discreet methods for sending information from London to Paris, techniques for avoiding being 'burned' by anarchists"...

=== 1896-1902: Third series (Paris) ===
After being acquitted and returning to France in 1895, Pouget relaunched the newspaper, initially under the name La Sociale, before restoring its original title in October 1896. The last issue of this second series appeared on 1 May 1899. A third series was published from January to April 1900. In 1902, a single issue of a fourth series was released.

== Legacy ==
=== Slang ===
Le Père Peinard, through its heavy use of slang forms, is a valuable source of information on the French popular language of the period. Alain Rey considered it the most important source of this kind for the final decade of the 19th century.

== Bibliography ==
- Eisenzweig, Uri (2001). Fictions de l'anarchisme [Fictions of anarchism] (in French). France: C. Bourgois. ISBN 2-267-01570-6.
- Bantman, Constance (2024), "La série londonienne du Père Peinard, une fenêtre sur les réseaux anarchistes transnationaux" [The Père Peinard London series : a witness of transnational anarchist networks], Parlement[s], Revue d'histoire politique (in French), vol. 40, no. 3, Paris, pp. 181–188
- Guérin, Daniel (2012). Ni Dieu ni maître : Une anthologie de l'anarchisme (in French). Paris: La Découverte. doi:10.3917/dec.gueri.2012.01. ISBN 978-2-7071-6690-6.
- Merriman, John M. (2016). The dynamite club: how a bombing in fin-de-siècle Paris ignited the age of modern terror. Yale University Press. ISBN 978-0-300-21792-6.
- Sonn, Richard D. (1989). Anarchism and cultural politics in fin de siècle France. Nebraska: University of Nebraska Press. ISBN 9780803241756.
