= Augustin Hamon =

French socialist-anarchist writer (1862–1945)

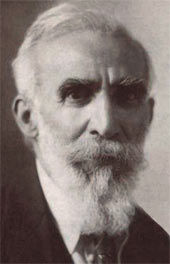
- Augustin Frédéric Hamon
- Born: December 3, 1862.
- Died: January 20, 1945 (aged 82)

Augustin Frédéric Adolphe Hamon (3 December 1862 – 20 January 1945) was a French socialist-anarchist and later communist editor, translator, and writer on philosophy and social psychology.

== Biography ==
Hamon studied at the Lycée Condorcet in Paris, where he lived until 1904. He was interested in psychology, criminology and politics. He began writing in 1881 and collaborated with various journals on science, sociology, and psychology. His first works, published from 1884 to 1891, were on hygiene; his first political book, co-authored with Georges Bachot, appeared in 1889.

In 1893, he became an anarchist. A disciple of Bakunin, he converted Fernand Pelloutier to anarchism. Due to the publication of studies on anarchism, he was monitored by the police. In 1894, when President Sadi Carnot was assassinated, he left France. He returned after a year in England and Scotland. Hamon became a freemason since 1894 and belonged to several lodges. He was also a member of the French Association of Freethinkers.

Hamon founded the anarchist magazine L'Humanité nouvelle in 1897, and edited it until 1903.

Hamon met George Bernard Shaw for the first time at a Fabian Congress in London in 1894. From 1904 onwards he and his wife Henriette (née Rynenbroeck) translated Shaw's work into French.

Hamon was a proponent of using antisemitism to appeal to a mass audience, arguing in an 1898 interview that "With the petty bourgeois especially, anti-Judaism is the road to Socialism. . .the stage through which the petty bourgeois passes before becoming a Socialist".

During the First World War, not being mobilized, he went into exile with his family in Great Britain and, as a lecturer, gave 13 courses at the University of London. He returned to Brittany and involved in local political struggles.

The electoral victory of the Popular Front was an opportunity for a resurgence his notoriety, thanks to his stature as an anti-fascist and pacifist political writer. During the war, he participated in the Resistance on the side of the Communists. After the liberation, he joined the French Communist Party, shortly before his death.

His papers are held at the International Institute of Social History.

== Works ==
- Les hommes et les théories du l'anarchie, 1893
- Psychologie de l'anarchiste-socialiste, 1895
- La psychologie du militaire professionnel, 1894
- Patrie et Internationalisme, 1896
- Un Anarchisme, fraction du socialisme, 1896
- Une enquête sur la guerre et le militarisme, 1899. Reprinted 1972.
- The Universal Illusion of Free Will and Criminal Responsibility. 1899.
- The twentieth century Molière: Bernard Shaw, 1911
- The technique of Bernard Shaw's plays, 1912
- Lessons of the world-war, 1917
