= Le Mouvement social =

Le Mouvement social is a French-language quarterly journal of social history.
