= Francis de Pressensé =

French politician and journalist

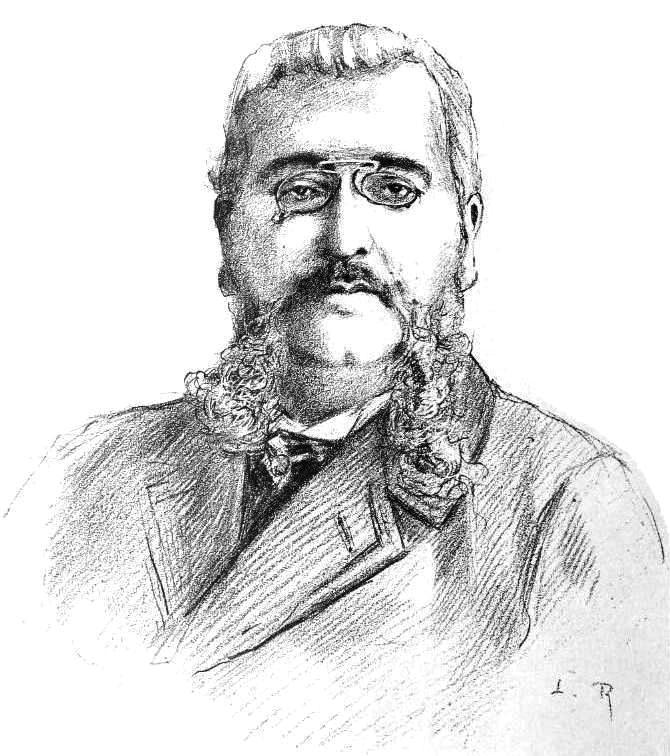
Francis de Pressensé

Francis Charles Dehault de Pressensé (September 30, 1853, Paris – January 19, 1914, Paris) was a French politician and journalist.

== Biography ==
He was the son of Protestant religious leader Edmond de Pressensé. He was educated at the Lyceé Bonaparte. He served on General Chanzy’s staff during the war of 1870 and was taken prisoner at Le Mans, but after the war entered the public service. After a short period at the Ministry of Public Instruction, he entered the diplomatic service, and was appointed first secretary at Washington, D.C. In 1882 he returned to France and took up journalism. He was a contributor to many journals, including the Revue des Deux Mondes and the République Française, and in 1888 became foreign editor of the Temps.

During this period, Pressensé associated with a number of anarchists, an ideology he was close to at the time. He moved in circles that also included Albert Libertad, Antoine Cyvoct, and Pierre Martinet.

On the rise of the Dreyfus Affair (1895) de Pressensé identified himself with the cause of the prisoner. He wrote in support of General Picquart, and in consequence of his advocacy of Émile Zola's cause was struck off the roll of the Legion of Honour. This led to his resignation from the Temps, and he came forward as a socialist politician, being in 1902 elected socialist deputy for the Rhône. He was prominent in the debates on the question of the separation of church and state, and a bill brought in by him formed the basis of the one finally carried by Aristide Briand.

== Honors ==
A street in Sofia, Bulgaria is named after him. A street in Lille, France, is named after him. A square in Bordeaux, France is named after him.
