= Draveil-Villeneuve-Saint-Georges strike =

1908 sand quarry worker strike near Paris

The Draveil-Villeneuve-Saint-Georges strike was a strike action of sand quarry workers in Draveil, Vigneux, and Villeneuve-Saint-Georges in 1908 that ended with two workers dead and repression of the French CGT labor union.
