= Giovanni Defendi =

Italian anarchist

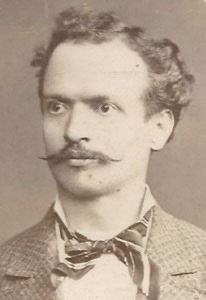
- Giovanni Defendi, c. 1875
- Born: 24 June 1849; Casalmaggiore, Austrian Empire
- Died: October 10, 1925 (aged 76)
- Occupation: Grocer
- Known for: Anarchism

Giovanni Defendi was an Italian revolutionary who fought for the Paris Commune, was imprisoned, and after release spent many years as a grocer and anarchist leader in exile in London.

== Early years ==
By his own account, Giovanni Defendi was born on 24 June 1849 in Casalmaggiore, Italy. He became a confectioner. He fought with Garibaldi in the war for Italian independence. On 17 or 18 May 1871 Defendi arrived in Paris after the demobilization of the red shirts, and participated in the Paris Commune. For this, on 27 April 1872 he was sentenced to 15 years in prison and was sent to Belle Île. After being released, he moved to London in 1880. On 21 February 1881 the Italian consul described him as 32 years old, almost 1.49 metres (4 ft 11 in) in height, who had spent eight years imprisoned in a small cell.

== Life in exile ==
Defendi met wife Emilia Tronzio, in London. A native of Cosenza, she had lost her parents in a cholera epidemic and had been adopted by the family of the internationalist Tito Zanardelli. In the 1870s she was the mistress of Errico Malatesta. In 1880 a letter was published in the Citoyen of Paris in which Giovanni Defendi and Emilia Tronzi-Zanardelli announced that on 1 May 1880 they had contracted a union libre, as opposed to a judicial or religious marriage. A similar statement was published in La Plebe of Milan on 2 May 1880. The Defendis opened a delicatessen at 12 Archer Street in the Soho section of London, home to many immigrants. They had six children. Giovanni used to go through the Italian colony selling his produce from a handcart, assisted by his son Enrico.

In 1885 Defendi was one of the leaders of the anarchists in London, along with Biagio Poggi and Vito Solieri. In 1896 Defendi was one of three judges on an anarchist court of honor that found Francesco Cini guilty of stealing some money he had collected to help Spanish militants who had been tortured while imprisoned in Montjuïc Castle. His children Enrico and Luigia also became anarchists, and were watched by the police. Defendi opened a grocery shop at 112 W. High Street in Islington. Emilia was the victim of an influenza epidemic in World War I.

== Sources ==
- Briguglio, Letterio (1965). Correnti politiche nel Veneto dopo Villafranca (1859-1866). Ed. di Storia e Letteratura. GGKEY:Q6U97LX9LTD.
- Deschamps, Nicolas; Jannet, Claudio (1881). Les sociétés secrètes et la société, ou, Philosophie de l'histoire contemporaine (in French). Seguin. p. 345.
- Dipaola, Pietro (April 2004). "The 1880s and the International Revolutionary Socialist Congress". Italian Anarchists in London (PDF). Archived from the original (PDF) on 2015-09-07.
- Gremmo, Roberto (2000). Gli anarchici che uccisero Umberto I ̊: Gaetano Bresci, il "Biondino" e i tessitori biellesi di Paterson. Storia Ribelle. p. 179.
- Rivista storica dell'anarchismo. Biblioteca Franco Serantini. 2001.
- "Sur les traces de Malatesta". A Contretemps (in French). January 2010.
- Toda, Misato (1988). Errico Malatesta da Mazzini a Bakunin: la sua formazione giovanile nell'ambiente napoletano (1868-1873) (in Italian). Guida Editori. p. 109. ISBN 978-88-7042-915-2.
