= Fernand Pelloutier =

French anarchist (1867–1901)

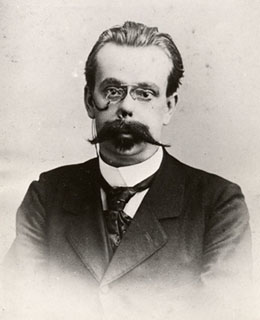
- Pelloutier (c. 1890s)

General secretary of the Federation of Labour Exchanges
- In office 1895–1901
- Preceded by: Rieul Cordier
- Succeeded by: Georges Yvetot

Personal details
- Born: 1 October 1867 17th arrondissement of Paris, France
- Died: 13 March 1901 (aged 33) Sèvres, Seine-et-Oise, France
- Cause of death: Lupus vulgaris
- Party: French Workers' Party (1892)
- Other political affiliations: Federation of Labour Exchanges (1892–1901)
- Children: Maurice Pelloutier
- Parent: Léonce Adrien Saint-Ange Pelloutier (father)
- Occupation: Journalist, trade unionist

Fernand Léonce Émile Pelloutier (1867–1901) was a French journalist, trade union organiser, and anarchist theoretician. A revolutionary from an early age, after beginning a career in journalism, Pelloutier became involved in socialist politics. He briefly joined the French Workers' Party, but following a disagreement with its leader over his proposal for a general strike, he left the party and joined the anarchist movement. He became the leader of the Bourses du Travail, in which he advocated for anarcho-syndicalism. Having suffered from tuberculosis luposa for most of his career, he eventually succumbed to the disease, and died in 1901 at the age of 33.

== Biography ==
Fernand Pelloutier was born in Paris on 1 October 1867. He was from a nonconformist family, which originated in Piedmont and settled in France after the death of Louis XIV. His grandfather was a republican, from whom he inherited revolutionary sentiments. While he was twelve, his family moved to Saint-Nazaire, where his father had been appointed as a post officer. Educated at a religious boarding school, Fernand attempted to escape and was eventually expelled for his anti-clericalism. He went on to enroll at the local secular college, but failed his baccalauréat in 1885.

After leaving school, Pelloutier went into a career in journalism, collaborating on Aristide Briand's journal La Démocratie de l'Ouest. In 1888, he contracted tuberculosis luposa and took some months to recover at the seaside. He attempted to go back to work, in order to support Briand's candidacy in the 1889 French legislative election, but his condition got worse again and he was forced to take two years off to recover.

In January 1892, he returned to Saint-Nazaire and was appointed as the editor-in-chief of La Démocratie de l'Ouest. He also joined the French Workers' Party, for which he acted as the secretary of its local section and with which he helped establish the Saint-Nazaire Bourse du Travail (English: Labour Exchange). In September 1892, he attended a regional workers' congress, at which he proposed the general strike as a means for the party to achieve its aims. He was opposed by the party's leader Jules Guesde, convincing Pelloutier to resign from the party. He moved back to Paris, where he joined the growing anarchist movement and began advocating for revolutionary syndicalism.

Under Pelloutier's leadership, the Bourses united into a national organisation, the Fédération des Bourses du travail (English: Federation of Labour Exchanges; FBT). In 1895, he was elected general secretary of the FBT. In an article for Les Temps Nouveuax, titled "Anarchism and the Workers' Unions", he advocated for anarchists to integrate themselves into the trade union movement, arguing that it was becoming increasingly revolutionary and opposed to parliamentary politics. He saw trade unions as an ideal transitionary organisation that could take workers through revolution towards anarchist communism. On 1 February 1897, he established the FBT's journal L'ouvrier des deux Mondes, for which he worked tirelessly for nearly two years. Under Pelloutier's leadership, the Bourses grew to count more than 250,000 members in its ranks.

Pelloutier's dedication to his work ended up exhausting him and contributed to the further deterioration of his physical health. He retired to Sèvres in January 1899, and by July of that year, he was beginning to suffer from haemoptysis. In order to improve his material situation, his friend Georges Sorel solicited the aid of Jean Jaurès, who managed to secure Pelloutier with a job as a clerk from the trade minister Alexandre Millerand. Despite worsening chronic pain, in September 1900, Pelloutier attended the FBT's congress, where he was forced to defend his government job and reaffirm his anti-statist principles. He returned from the congress completely exhausted and spent the last months of his life bedridden and in constant pain. Pelloutier died on 13 March 1901.

== Legacy ==
Pelloutier has been recognised as one of the most important figures in French socialism. French trade unionist Pierre Monatte described Pelloutier as the "father of revolutionary syndicalism". Pelloutier's theories were exceptionally important to the revolutionary syndicalist movement in Italy that appeared towards the end of the nineteenth century, and he is a source of major influence in this regard for Georges Sorel. Both saw the socialist movement as divided between those supporting the political action of parties and those supporting direct action. In 1902, a year after Pelloutier's death, the Bourses du Travail merged with the Confédération Générale du Travail.

That same year saw the posthumous publication of his Histoire des bourses du travail, which formed the theoretical foundation for anarcho-syndicalism.

== Selected works ==
- Qu’est-ce que la Grève générale? / What Is the General Strike? (1894)
- Anarchism and the Workers' Unions (1895)
- L'Organisation corporative et l'anarchie (1896)
- Art and Revolt (1896)
- History of the Bourses du Travail (1902)

== Bibliography ==
- Davranche, Guillaume (1 November 2019) [4 March 2014]. "PELLOUTIER Fernand, Léonce, Émile". Dictionnaire des anarchistes (in French).
- Jennings, Jeremy (1990). "Fernand Pelloutier and Revolutionary Syndicalism". Syndicalism in France. New York: St. Martin's Press. ISBN 0-312-04027-X. LCCN 89-24114. OCLC 20391176.
- Maitron, Jean (23 November 2022) [30 March 2010]. "PELLOUTIER Fernand, Léonce, Émile". Dictionnaire biographique du mouvement ouvrier français (in French).
- "Fernand Pelloutier". Encyclopædia Britannica. 27 September 2023 [20 July 1998].
- Stanley, John (1981). The Sociology of Virtue: The Political & Social Theories of Georges Sorel. University of California Press. ISBN 978-0-520-03790-8.
