= Fernand Desprès =

French journalist (1879–1949)

Fernand Désiré Alfred Després
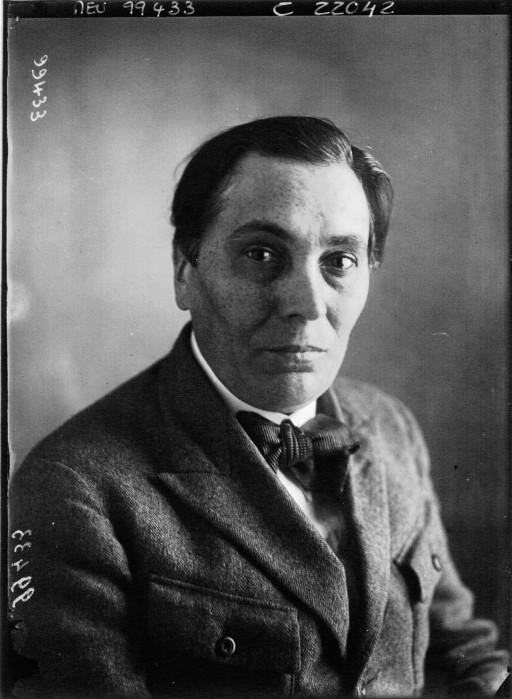
- Després in 1922
- Born: 13 April 1879; Ouzouer-le-Marché, Loir-et-Cher, France
- Died: 14 February 1949 (aged 69); Algiers, Algeria
- Occupations: Shoemaker and journalist.

Fernand Désiré Alfred Desprès (or Després depending on the source) (13 April 1879 – 14 February 1949) was a French shoemaker, anarchist, journalist and later a Communist activist. As a young man he was a close friend of the poet Gaston Couté.

== Early years ==
Fernand Désiré Alfred Després was born in Ouzouer-le-Marché, Loir-et-Cher on 13 April 1879. He was born in the hamlet of Mauvelles. (Note: Another source gives his birthplace as the hamlet of Chandry, also in the commune of Ouzouer-le-Marché. Chandry is a slightly larger community a few hundred meters to the southeast of Mauvelles.) While young he spent holidays with a friend of the father of the future poet Gaston Couté. He and Gaston Couté formed a friendship that would last after they had moved to Paris. Després went with Couté and his parents to Mauves, and Couté went with Després to Beauce. Després found work as a shoemaker with Constant Marie, known as Père La Purge, an anarchist theoretician. He met the young anarchist Miguel Almereyda (Eugène Bonaventure Vigo) around 1896 and would be godfather to his son, the future filmmaker Jean Vigo. (Note: Almereyda died in 1917. Després would provide moral support to his son, Jean Vigo (1905–1934), while he completed his education and during his short but influential career as a filmmaker.)

== Journalist ==
In 1899 Després began to contribute to the Journal du Peuple, edited by Sébastien Faure. In 1901 he and Almereyda were charged in a case involving manufacture of explosives, but his charge was dismissed. In 1901 he became a full-time journalist. He contributed to the journal L’Homme that year, then to Libertaire, La Guerre sociale and La Bataille syndicaliste. He occasionally wrote violent articles for L'Humanité. He also wrote for the Les Cahiers de l’Université Populaire, an anarchist journal, in 1906 and 1907. He was charged with forgery in 1909, but the charge was dismissed.

In 1911 Després was on vacation in Chandry, Ouzouer-le-Marché when he heard of the death of Gaston Couté. Without access to notes, he wrote a leading article on Couté for a special edition of La Guerre Sociale entirely from memory. He later wrote other articles on Couté in the Vie Ouvrière (1911), the Journal du Peuple, the Bataille Syndicaliste and in Humanité (1924).

From 1912 Després devoted himself to the trade union struggle. He became one of the leading writers using the pseudonym "A. Desbois". He was registered in Carnet B before World War I (1914–18). He was a militant pacifist in 1915 with Romain Rolland, Marcelle Capy, Pierre Monatte and others. In August 1915 he and his partner Marcelle Capy resigned from the La Bataille syndicaliste because the paper had adopted the union sacrée position and would not let him write in defense of his friend Romain Rolland. Després contributed to the anarchist journal L’École de la Fédération between 1915 and 1919.

In 1918–19 Després was charged with aiding the enemy after staying with Romain Rolland in Geneva, but the charge was dismissed. In 1918 Després, Marcel Martinet and Jean de Saint-Prix published La Plèbe, a magazine that was harassed by the censors and then banned. Després contributed to the L’Avenir international between 1918 and 1920, a review that was very favorable to the Russian Revolution. He stayed in Aisne after the war, then in 1920 moved to Anzin, Nord, where he worked as a boilermaker. There he established the revolutionary syndicalist committee of Valenciennes, and in 1921 became its secretary.

== Communist activist ==
Després joined the French Communist Party when it was founded in December 1920. He left the Nord department at the end of 1921. He contributed to the Communist journal L'Humanité. His salary at L'Humanité was that of a skilled workman, enough to cover expenses but not much more. Although Després remained a member of the party for the rest of his life, he also remained a convinced revolutionary syndicalist, a position that began to seem old fashioned. He was not always willing to follow the party line, which caused some difficulties when he was working for party's official organ, although he was highly respected and his position was reasonably secure.

Després was a delegate to the 11th Congress of the Communist Party in October 1922. In 1926 he was a member of the party's Colonial Commission. Després ran unsuccessfully as Communist candidate for election to the legislature in 1932 for Fontenay-le-Comte, Vendée He later worked as a proofreader while continuing to contribute to l’Humanité. Després left Paris for Nice at the start of World War II (1939–45). In June 1940 he took refuge in North Africa, where he lived alone in a hotel room. The Germans destroyed all his books and papers. After the war, he was not allowed to travel. He wrote for the press in Oran and Algiers, and worked for the radio service in Algiers until the end.

Fernand Desprès died in Algiers on 14 February 1949, aged 69. He had suffered a paralyzing stroke a few days earlier, and died in hospital.

== Sources ==
- "Fernand-Désiré-Alfred Després". Medias19 (in French).
- Gauthier, R. (1949). "Fernand Desprès N'est Plus ..." (PDF). Les Amis de Gaston Couté. 3 (6).
- Gomes, Paulo Emílio Salles (1971-01-01). Jean Vigo. University of California Press. p. 49. ISBN 978-0-520-01676-7.
- Robin, François Paul (2014-10-25). "Monographie sur "·Fernand, Désiré, Alfred DESPRÉS dit A. Dubois·"". Itinéraire Gaston Couté (in French). Archived from the original on 2015-02-03. (A slightly shorter version of this article was found on 2015-02-03 in the Dictionnaire des militants anarchistes dated 28 February 2007, signed "R.D.", and giving sources.)
