= Directorate General for External Security =

France's external intelligence agency

- Direction générale de la Sécurité extérieure
- Seal of the DGSE

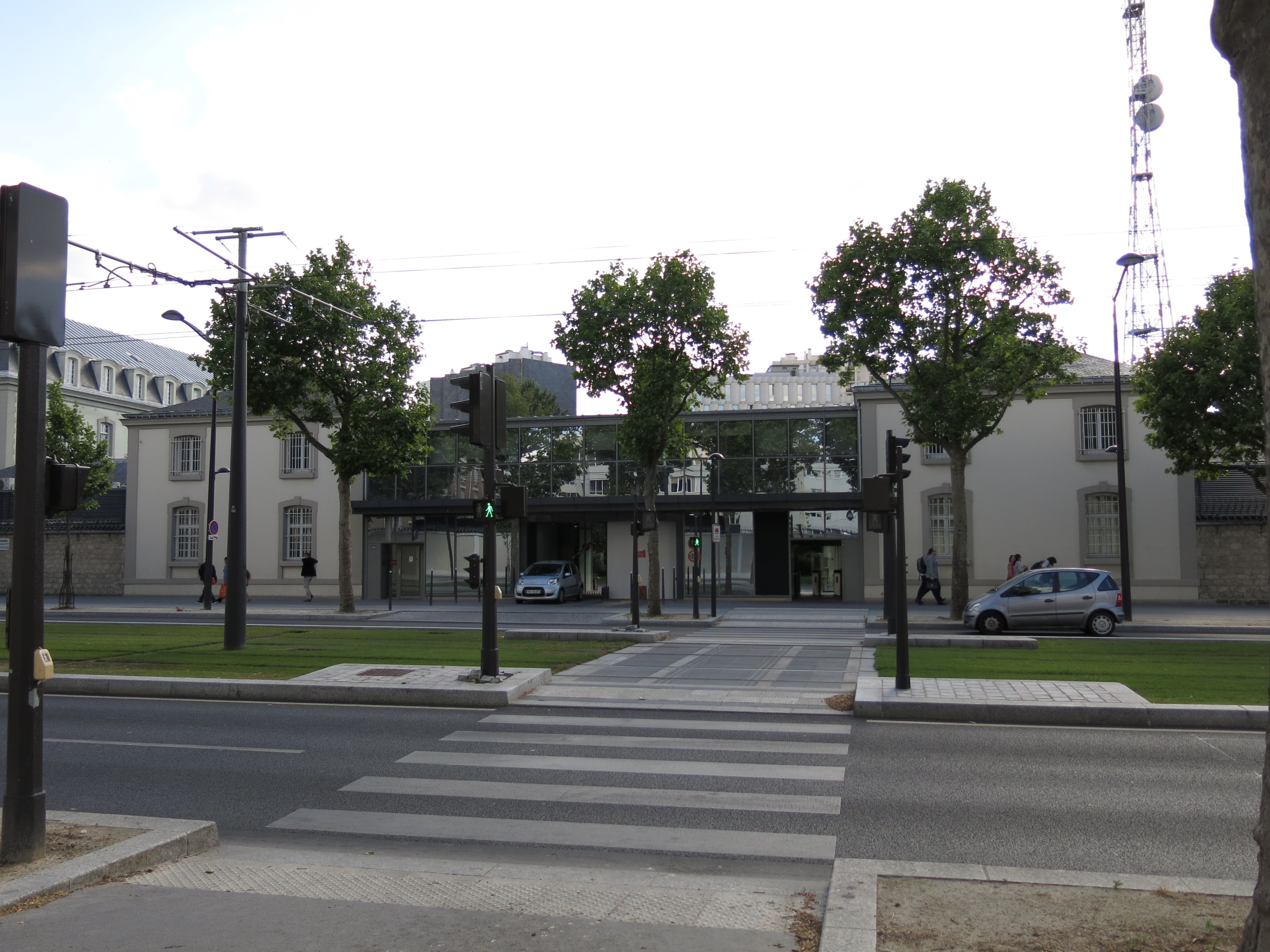
- The headquarters of DGSE in Paris

Agency overview
- Formed: 2 April 1982; 44 years ago
- Preceding agency: External Documentation and Counter-Espionage Service
- Jurisdiction: Government of France
- Headquarters: 141 Boulevard Mortier, Paris XX, France; 48.8744°N 2.4067°E
- Motto: Partout où nécessité fait loi "Wherever necessity makes law"
- Employees: 7,000
- Annual budget: €1.145 billion (2026)
- Minister responsible: Catherine Vautrin, Minister of the Armed Forces
- Agency executive: Nicolas Lerner, Director
- Parent Ministry: Ministry of Armed Forces
- Website: www.dgse.gouv.fr

The Directorate General for External Security (French: Direction générale de la Sécurité extérieure, DGSE) is France's foreign intelligence agency, equivalent to the British SIS and the American CIA, established on 27 November 1943. The DGSE safeguards French national security through intelligence gathering and conducting paramilitary and counterintelligence operations abroad, as well as economic espionage. The service is currently headquartered in the 20th arrondissement of Paris, but construction has begun on a new headquarters at Fort Neuf de Vincennes, in Vincennes, on the eastern edge of Paris.

The DGSE operates under the direction of the French Ministry of Armed Forces and works alongside its domestic counterpart, the DGSI (General Directorate for Internal Security). As with most other intelligence agencies, details of its operations and organization are classified and not made public.

== History ==
=== Origins ===
The DGSE can trace its roots back to 27 November 1943, when a central external intelligence agency, known as the DGSS (Direction générale des services spéciaux), was founded by politician Jacques Soustelle. The name of the agency was changed on 26 October 1944, to DGER (Direction générale des études et recherches). As the organisation was characterised by numerous cases of nepotism, abuses and political feuds, Soustelle was removed from his position as Director.

Former free-fighter André Dewavrin, aka "Colonel Passy", was tasked to reform the DGER; he fired more than 8,300 of the 10,000 full-time intelligence workers Soustelle had hired, and the agency was renamed SDECE (Service de documentation extérieure et de contre-espionnage) on 28 December 1945. The SDECE also brought under one head a variety of separate agencies – some, such as the well-known Deuxième Bureau, aka 2e Bureau, created by the military circa 1871–1873 in the wake of the birth of the French Third Republic. Another was the BRCA (Bureau central de renseignements et d'action), formed during WWII, from July 1940 to 27 November 1943, with André Dewavrin as its head.

On 2 April 1982, the new left wing government of François Mitterrand extensively reformed the SDECE and renamed it DGSE. The SDECE had remained independent until the mid-1960s, when it was discovered to have been involved in the kidnapping and presumed murder of Mehdi Ben Barka, a Moroccan revolutionary living in Paris. Following this scandal, it was announced that the agency was placed under the control of the French Ministry of Defence. In reality, foreign intelligence activities in France have always been supervised by the military since 1871, for political reasons mainly relating to anti-Bonapartism and the rise of Socialism. Exceptions related to telecommunications interception and cyphering and code-breaking, which were also conducted by the police in territorial France, and by the Ministry of Foreign Affairs abroad, and economic and financial intelligence, which were also carried out initially by the Ministry of Foreign Affairs and, from 1915 onwards, by the Ministry of Commerce until the aftermath of WWII, when the SDECE of the Ministry of Defence took over the specialty in partnership with the Ministry for the Economy and Finance.

In 1992, most of the defence responsibilities of the DGSE, no longer relevant to the post-Cold War context, were transferred to the Military Intelligence Directorate (DRM), a new military agency. Combining the skills and knowledge of five military groups, the DRM was created to close the intelligence gaps of the 1991 Gulf War.

=== Cold War-era rivalries ===
The SDECE and DGSE have been shaken by numerous scandals. In 1968, for example, Philippe Thyraud de Vosjoli, who had been an important officer in the French intelligence system for 20 years, asserted in published memoirs that the SDECE had been deeply penetrated by the Soviet KGB in the 1950s. He also indicated that there had been periods of intense rivalry between the French and U.S. intelligence systems. In the early 1990s a senior French intelligence officer created another major scandal by revealing that the DGSE had conducted economic intelligence operations against American businessmen in France.

A major scandal for the service in the late Cold War was the sinking of the Rainbow Warrior in 1985. The Rainbow Warrior was sunk by DGSE operatives, unintentionally killing one of the crew. They had set two time-separated explosive charges to encourage evacuation, but photographer Fernando Pereira stayed inside the boat to rescue his expensive cameras and drowned following the second explosion. (See below in this article for more details). The operation was ordered by the French President, François Mitterrand. New Zealand was outraged that its sovereignty was violated by an ally, as was the Netherlands since the killed Greenpeace activist was a Dutch citizen and the ship had Amsterdam as its port of origin.

=== Political controversies ===
The agency was conventionally run by French military personnel until 1999, when former diplomat Jean-Claude Cousseran was appointed its head. Cousseran had served as an ambassador to Turkey and Syria, as well as a strategist in the Ministry of Foreign Affairs. Cousseran reorganized the agency to improve the flow of information, following a series of reforms drafted by Bruno Joubert, the agency's director of strategy at that time.

This came during a period when the French government was formed as a cohabitation between left and right parties. Cousseran, linked to the Socialist Party, was therefore obliged to appoint Jean-Pierre Pochon of the Gaullist RPR as head of the Intelligence Directorate. Being conscious of the political nature of the appointment, and wanting to steer around Pochon, Cousseron placed one of his friends in a top job under Pochon. Alain Chouet, a specialist in terrorism, especially Algerian and Iranian networks, took over as chief of the Security Intelligence Service. He had been on post in Damascus at a time when Cousseran was France's ambassador to Syria. Chouet began writing reports to Cousseran that bypassed his immediate superior, Pochon.

Politics eventually took precedence over DGSE's intelligence function. Instead of informing the president's staff of reports directly concerning President Chirac, Cousseran informed only Socialist prime minister Lionel Jospin, who was going to run against Chirac in the 2002 presidential election. Pochon learned of the maneuvers only in March 2002 and informed Chirac's circle of the episode. He then had a furious argument with Cousseran and was informally told he wasn't wanted around the agency anymore. Pochon nonetheless remained Director of Intelligence, though he no longer turned up for work. He remained "ostracized" until the arrival of a new DGSE director, Pierre Brochand, in August 2002.

== Organization ==
=== Organizational Structure ===
The DGSE is made up of various units and divisions including:

- Director-General
  - General Inspectorate Service
  - Deputy Director-General
    - Operational Coordination Unit
      - Administration Department
        - Human Resources Management Department
        - Training Department
        - Purchasing and Finance Department
        - Real Estate Affairs Department
        - Operational and Logistical Support Service
      - General Secretariat for Analysis and Strategy
      - Research and Operations Directorate
      - Technical and Innovation Department
      - Security and Protection Directorate

=== Divisions ===
The DGSE includes the following directorates:

- Directorate of Intelligence Collection and Operations (DRO)
- Technical and Innovated Directorate
- Directorate of Administration
- The General Secretariat for the Analysis of Strategy
- Directorate of Strategy
- Directorate of Intelligence

==== Technical Directorate (or COMINT Department) ====
In partnership with the Direction du renseignement militaire, DRM (Directorate of Military Intelligence) and with considerable support from the Army in particular, and from the Air Force and the Navy to lesser extent, the DGSE is responsible for electronic spying abroad. Historically the Ministry of Defence in general has always been much interested in telecommunications interception. In the early 1880s a partnership between the Post Office (also in charge of all national telegraphic communications) and the Army gave birth to an important military telegraphy unit of more than 600 men; it settled in the Fort of the Mont Valérien near Paris. In 1888, the military settled the first service of telecommunications interception and deciphering in the Hôtel des Invalides, Paris—where it is still active today as an independent intelligence agency secretly created in 1959 under the name Groupement Interministériel de Contrôle or GIC (Inter-ministerial Control Group).

In 1910, the military unit of the Mont Valérien grew up with the creation of a wireless telecommunication station, and three years later it transformed into a regiment of about 1000 men. Anecdotally, government domestic Internet tapping and its best specialists are still located in the same area today (in underground facilities in Taverny and surroundings), though unofficially and not only. At about the same time, the Army and the Navy created several "listening stations" in the region of the Mediterranean Sea, and they began to intercept the coded wireless communications of the British and Spanish navies. It was the first joint use of wireless telegraphy and Cryptanalysis in the search for intelligence of military interest.

In the 1970s, the SDECE considerably developed its technical capacities in code-breaking, notably with the acquisition of a supercomputer from Cray. In the 1980s, the DGSE heavily invested in satellite telecommunications interception, and created several satellite listening stations in France and overseas. The department of this agency responsible for telecommunications interception was anonymously called Direction Technique (Technical Directorate). But in the early 1990s the DGSE was alarmed by a steady and important decrease of its foreign telecommunication interception and gathering, as telecommunication by submarine cables was supplanting satellites. At that time the DGSE was using Silicon Graphics computers for code-breaking while simultaneously asking Groupe Bull computers to develop French-made supercomputers. Until then, the DGSE had been sheltering its computers and was carrying code-breaking 100 feet underground its headquarters of Boulevard Mortier, lest of foreign electronic spying and possible jamming. But this underground facility quickly became too small and poorly practical. That is why from 1987 to 1990 important works were carried on in the underground of the Taverny Air Base, whose goal was to secretly build a large communication deciphering and computer analysis center then called Centre de Transmission et de Traitement de l'Information, CTTI (Transmission and Information Processing Center). The CTTI was the direct ancestor of the Pôle National de Cryptanalyse et de Décryptement–PNCD (National Branch of Cryptanalysis and Decryption), launched to fit a new policy of intelligence sharing between agencies called Mutualisation du Renseignement (Intelligence Pooling). Once the work was finished, the huge underground of the former Taverny Air base, located in Taverny a few miles northeast of Paris, sheltered the largest Faraday cage in Europe (for protection against leaks of radio electric waves (see also Tempest (codename) for technical explanations) and possible EMP, attacks (see Nuclear electromagnetic pulse for technical explanations), with supercomputers working 24/7 on processing submarine cable telecommunications interception and signal deciphering. The Taverny underground facility also has a sister base located in Mutzig, also settled underground, which officially is sheltering the 44e Régiment de Transmissions, 44e RT (44th Signal Regiment). For today more than ever, signal regiments of the French Army still carries on civilian telecommunication interceptions under the pretense of training and military exercises in electronic warfare in peacetime. The DGSE otherwise enjoys the technical cooperation of the French companies Orange S.A. (which also provides cover activities to the staff of the Technical Directorate of the DGSE), and Alcatel-Lucent for its know-how in optical cable interception.

Allegedly, in 2007–2008 State Councilor Jean-Claude Mallet advised newly elected President Nicolas Sarkozy to invest urgently in submarine cable tapping, and in computer capacities to automatically collect and decipher optical data. This was undertaken in the early 2000s. Mallet planned the installation of a new computer system to break codes. Officially, this enormous foreign intelligence program began in 2008, and it was all set in 2013. Its cost would have amounted 700 million euros, and resulted in a first hiring of about 600 new DGSE employees, all highly skilled specialists in related fields. Since then the DGSE is constantly expending its staff of specialists in cryptanalysis, decryption and signal and computer engineers. For in 2018 about 90% of world trade is no longer going through satellites, but submarine fiber-optic cables drawn between continents. And the Technical Directorate of the DGSE mainly targets intelligence of financial and economic natures.

Remarkably, the DGSE, along with the DRM with which it works closely, have established together a partnership in telecommunication interception with its German counterpart the BND (the Technische Aufklärung, or Technical Directorate of this agency more particularly), and with an important support from the French Army with regard to infrastructures and means and staff. Thanks to its close partnership with the DRM, the DGSE also enjoys the service of the large spy ship French ship Dupuy de Lôme (A759), which entered the service of the French Navy in April 2006. The DGSE and the DRM since long also have a special agreement in intelligence with the United Arab Emirates, thanks to which these agencies share with the German BND a COMINT station located in the Al Dhafra Air Base 101. The DGSE also enjoys a partnership in intelligence activities with the National Intelligence Agency (South Africa).

Today the French intelligence community would rank third in the world behind the American National Security Agency and British GCHQ in capacities of telecommunication interceptions worldwide.

==== Action Division ====
The action division (Division Action) is responsible for planning and performing clandestine operations. It also performs other security-related operations such as testing the security of nuclear power plants (as it was revealed in Le Canard Enchaîné in 1990) and military facilities such as the submarine base of the Île Longue, Bretagne. The division's headquarters are located at the fort of Noisy-le-Sec. As the DGSE has a close partnership with the "Commandement des Opérations Spéciales" of the Army or COS (Special Operations Command), the Action Division selects most of its men from regiments of this military organization, the 1er Régiment de Parachutistes d'Infanterie de Marine, 1er R.P.I.Ma (1st Marine Infantry Parachute Regiment) and the 13e Régiment de Dragons Parachutistes, 13e RDP (13th Parachute Dragoon Regiment) in particular. But, in general, a large number of DGSE executives and staff members under military statuses, and also of operatives first enlisted in one of these two last regiments, and also in the past in the 11e régiment parachutiste de choc, 11e RPC (11th Shock Parachute Regiment), colloquially called "11e Choc," and in the 1er Bataillon Parachutiste de Choc, 1er BPC (1st Shock Parachute Battalion), colloquially called "1er Choc."

=== Installations ===
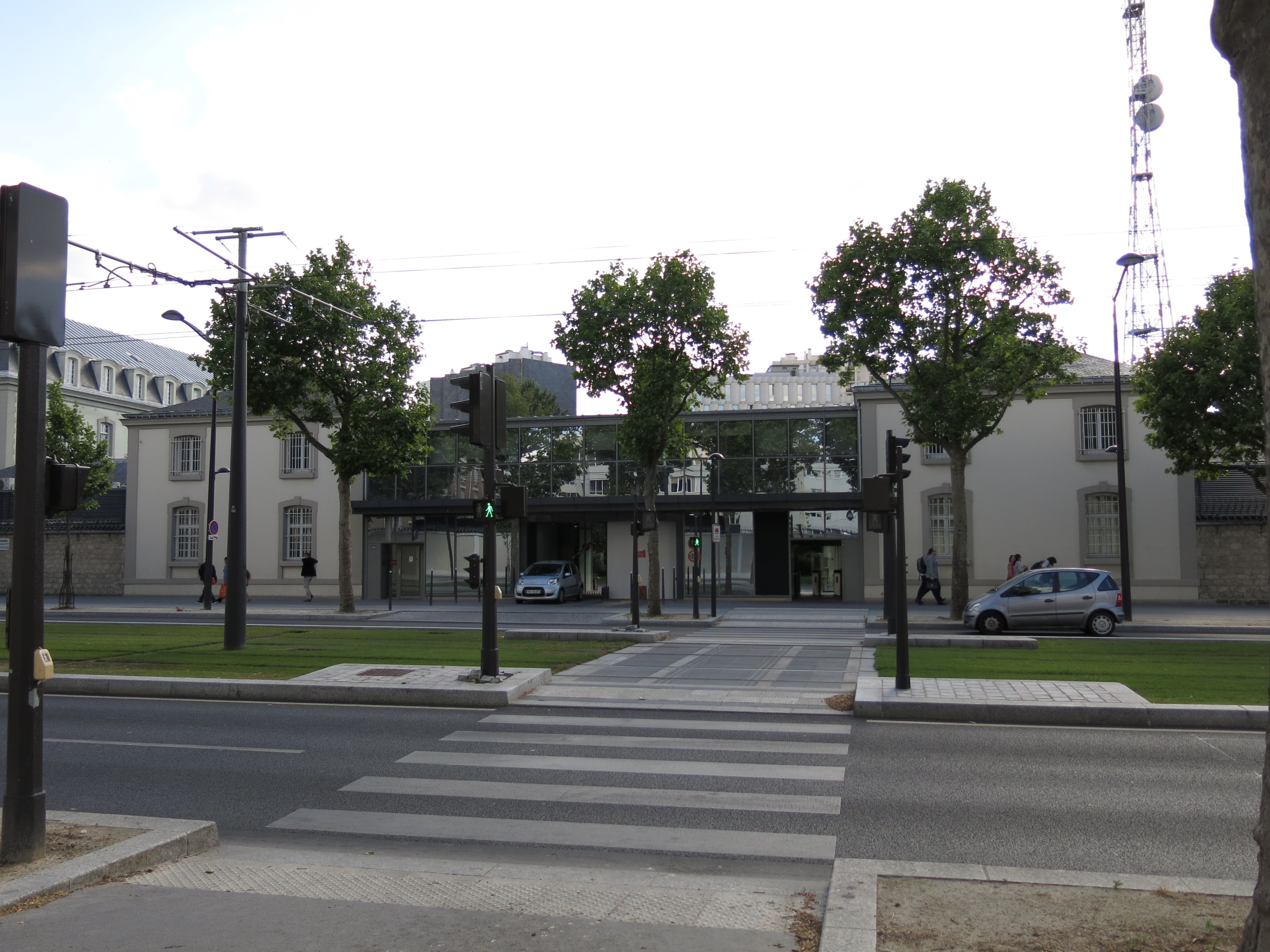
Headquarters, boulevard Mortier

The DGSE headquarters, codenamed CAT (Centre Administratif des Tourelles), are located at 141 Boulevard Mortier in the 20th arrondissement in Paris, approximately 1 km northeast of the Père Lachaise Cemetery. The building is often referred to as La piscine ("the swimming pool") because of the nearby Piscine des Tourelles of the French Swimming Federation.

A project named "Fort 2000" was supposed to allow the DGSE headquarters to be moved to the fort of Noisy-le-Sec, where the Action Division and the Service Technique d'Appui or "STA" (Technical and Support Service) were already stationed. However, the project was often disturbed and interrupted due to lacking funds, which were not granted until the 1994 and 1995 defence budgets. The allowed budget passed from 2 billion francs to one billion, and as the local workers and inhabitants started opposing the project, it was eventually canceled in 1996. The DGSE instead received additional premises located in front of the Piscine des Tourelles, and a new policy called "Privatisation des Services" (Privatization of the Services) was set. Roughly speaking, the Privatization of the Services consists for the DGSE in creating on the French territory numerous private companies of varied sizes, each being used as cover activity for specialized intelligence cells and units. This policy allows to turn round the problem of heavily investing in the building of large and highly secured facilities, and also of public and parliamentary scrutinies. This method is not entirely new however, since in 1945 the DGER, ancestor of the DGSE, owned 123 anonymous buildings, houses and apartments in addition to the military barracks of Boulevard Mortier serving already as headquarters. And this dispersion of premises began very early at the time of the Deuxième Bureau, and more particularly from the 1910s on, when intelligence activities carried on under the responsibility of the military knew a strong and steady rise in France.

=== French nationals who are voluntary spies ===
The DGSE also relies on an undisclosed number of voluntary correspondents (spies), who are predominantly French nationals, both within France and abroad, and who are not listed among government civil servants. For many years, these individuals were known by the title "honorable correspondant" (honourable correspondent), or simply "HC." More recently, they have been referred to as "contact" (contact).

By contrast, the DGSE designates as "source" (source) any French or foreign national recruited by the agency, whether as a "conscious and willing" collaborator or as an "unconscious or unwilling" asset (i.e., one who is manipulated). In English-speaking contexts, a DGSE officer specifically trained and dispatched to conduct espionage abroad is generally called an "operative." Within the DGSE, however, such agents are referred to as "agent volant" (flying agent), by analogy with a butterfly rather than a bird. Colloquially, the agency may also refer to a female operative as a "hirondelle" (swallow).

Collectively, the DGSE uses the term "capteurs" (sensors) to refer indiscriminately to its contacts, sources, and flying agents.

=== Budget ===
The DGSE's budget is entirely official (it is voted upon and accepted by the French parliament). It generally consists of about €500M, in addition to which are added special funds from the Prime Minister (often used in order to finance certain operations of the Action Division). How these special funds are spent has always been kept secret.

Some known yearly budgets include:

- 1991: FRF 0.9bn
- 1992: FRF 1bn
- 1997: FRF 1.36bn
- 1998: FRF 1.29bn
- 2007: EUR 450 million, plus 36 million in special funds.
- 2009: EUR 543.8 million, plus 48.9 million in special funds.

According to Claude Silberzahn, one of its former directors, the agency's budget is divided in the following manner:

- 25% for military intelligence
- 25% for economic intelligence
- 50% for diplomatic intelligence

=== Directors ===
- Pierre Marion (17 June 1981 – 10 November 1982)
- Adm. Pierre Lacoste (10 November 1982 – 19 September 1985)
- Gen. René Imbot (20 September 1985 – 1 December 1987)
- Gen. François Mermet (2 December 1987 – 23 March 1989)
- Claude Silberzahn (23 March 1989 – 7 June 1993)
- Jacques Dewatre (7 June 1993 – 19 December 1999)
- Jean-Claude Cousseran (19 December 1999 – 24 July 2002)
- Pierre Brochand (24 July 2002 – 10 October 2008)
- Erard Corbin de Mangoux (10 October 2008 – 10 April 2013)
- Bernard Bajolet (10 April 2013 – 27 April 2017)
- Jean-Pierre Palasset (interim) (27 April 2017 – 26 June 2017)
- Bernard Émié (26 June 2017 – 8 January 2024)
- Nicolas Lerner (9 January 2024 – present)

== Logo ==
As of 18 July 2012 the organisation had inaugurated its current logo. The bird of prey represents the sovereignty, operational capacities, international operational nature, and the efficiency of the DGSE. France is depicted as a sanctuary in the logo. The lines depict the networks utilized by the DGSE.

== Activities ==
=== Range ===
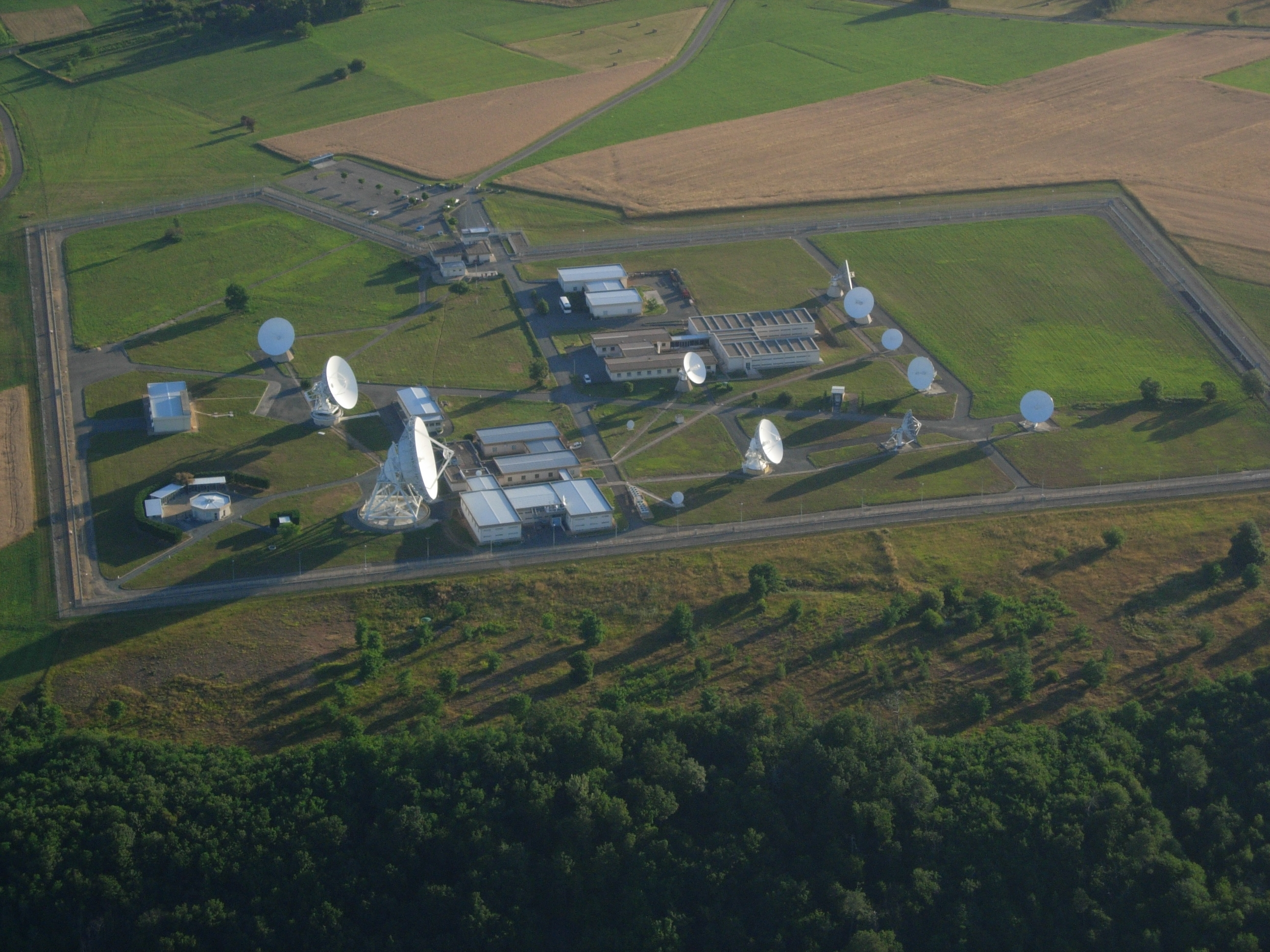
SIGINT installations in the Domme commune

Various tasks and roles are generally appointed to the DGSE:

- Intelligence gathering:
  - HUMINT, internally called "ROHUM," which stands for Renseignement d'Origine Humaine (Intelligence of Human Origin), is carried on by a large network of agents and under-agents, contacts, and sources who are not directly and officially paid by the DGSE in a large majority of instances and by reason of secrecy, but by varied public services and private companies which are not all necessarily cover-ups by vocation however, and which thus cooperate through particular and unofficial agreements. But many under-agents, contacts and sources act out of patriotism and political/ideological motives, and they are not all aware to help an intelligence agency.
  - SIGINT (COMINT/SIGINT/ELINT), internally called "ROEM," which stands for Renseignement d'Origine Electromagnétique (Intelligence of Electromagnetic Origin), is carried on from France and from a network of COMINT stations overseas, each internally called Centre de Renseignement Électronique, CRE (Electronic Intelligence Center). And then two other names are used to name: smaller COMINT/SIGINT territorial or oversea stations, internally called Détachement Avancé de Transmission, CAT (Signal Detachment Overseas); and specifically ELINT and SIGINT stations indifferently located on the French soil and overseas, each called Centre de Télémesure Militaire, CTM (Military Telemetry Center). Since the 1980s, the DGSE focuses much of its efforts and financial expenditures in communications interception (COMINT) abroad, which today (2018) has a reach extending from the east coast of the United States to Japan, with a focus on the Arabian Peninsula between these two opposite areas. In the DGSE in particular, those considerable and very expensive COMINT capacities are under the official responsibility of its Direction Technique, DT, (Technical Directorate). But as these capacities are rapidly growing and passively involve about all other French intelligence agencies (more than 20) in the context of a new policy called Mutualisation du Renseignement (Intelligence pooling between agencies) officially decreed in 2016, the whole of it is called Pôle National de Cryptanalyse et de Décryptement, PNCD (National Branch of Cryptanalysis and Decryption) since the early 2000s at least. Earlier and from 1987 to 1990 on in particular, the PNCD was called Centre de Transmission et de Traitement de l'Information, CTTI (Transmission and Information Processing Center), and its main center is secretly located underground the Taverny Air Base, in the eastern Paris' suburb. Otherwise, the French press nicknamed the French COMINT capacities and network Frenchlon, borrowing to ECHELON, its U.S. equivalent.
  - Space imagery analysis: integrated in the "ROIM" general mission, standing for Renseignement d'Origine Image (Intelligence of Image Origin).
- Special operations, such as missions behind enemy lines, exfiltrations otherwise called extraction, Coup d'état and revolution of palace and counter-revolutions (in African countries in particular since WWII), and sabotages and assassinations (on the French soil as abroad), with the help of the regiments of the Special Operations Command, COS.
- Counterintelligence on the French soil is not officially acknowledged by the DGSE, as this is officially part of the general mission of the General Directorate for Internal Security, DGSI, along with counter-terrorism in particular. But in reality, and for several reasons, the DGSE has indeed for a long time also carried out counterintelligence missions on French soil, which it calls "contre-ingérence" (counter-interference), as well as much "offensive counterintelligence" operations abroad. As a matter of fact the former name of the DGSE, the SDECE, means Service de Documentation Extérieure et de Contre-Espionnage (External Documentation and Counter-Espionage Service). Counterintelligence activities in the DGSE are integrated in a more general mission internally called "Mesures actives" (active measures), directly inspired by the Russian Active measures in their principles. That is why offensive counterintelligence (or counter-interference) in the DGSE has multiple and direct connections with the other and different fields of "counter-influence" and influence (i.e. on the French soil as abroad) (see Agent of influence), and also by extension with Agitprop operations (all specialties in intelligence rather called Psychological warfare in English-speaking countries).

=== Known operations ===
==== 1970s ====
- Under the codename "Operation Caban", the SDECE staged a coup d'état against Emperor Jean-Bédel Bokassa in the Central African Empire in September 1979, and installed a pro-French government.
- Between the early 1970s and the late 1980s, the SDECE/DGSE had effectively planted agents in major U.S. companies, such as Texas Instruments, IBM and Corning. Some of the economic intelligence thus acquired was shared with French corporations, such as the Compagnie des Machines Bull.

==== 1980s ====
- Working with the DST in the early 1980s, the agency exploited the source "Farewell", revealing the most extensive technological spy network uncovered in Europe and the United States to date. This network had allowed the United States and other European countries to gather significant amounts of information about important technical advances in the Soviet Union without the knowledge of the KGB. However, former DGSE employee Dominique Poirier contends, in his book he self-published in May 2018, that KGB Lt-Colonel Vladimir Vetrov code-named "Farewell" could not possibly reveal, alone, the names of 250 KGB officers acting abroad undercover, and help identify nearly 100 Soviet spies in varied western countries, at least by reason of the rule of "compartmentalization" or need to know.
- The DGSE exploited a network called "Nicobar", which facilitated the sale of forty-three Mirage 2000 fighter jets by French defence companies to India for a total of more than US$2 billion, and the acquisition of information about the type of the armour used on Soviet T-72 tanks.
- Operation Satanique, a mission aimed at preventing protests by Greenpeace against French nuclear testing in the Pacific through the sinking of the Rainbow Warrior in Auckland, New Zealand, on 10 July 1985. A French navy limpet mine exploded at 11:38 pm when many of the crew were asleep, and blew a large hole in the ship's hull. A second limpet mine exploded on the propeller shaft when Fernando Pereira, ships photographer, returned to retrieve his camera equipment, he was trapped in his cabin and drowned. New Zealand Police initiated one of their country's largest investigations and uncovered the plot after they captured two DGSE agents, who pleaded guilty to manslaughter and arson. French relations with New Zealand were sorely strained, as they threatened New Zealand with EEC sanctions in an attempt to secure the agents' release. Australia also attempted to arrest DGSE agents to extradite them. The incident is still widely remembered in New Zealand. The uncovering of the operation resulted in the firing of the head of the DGSE and the resignation of the French Defence Minister.

==== 1990s ====
- During the 1994 Genocide Against the Tutsi in Rwanda, the DGSE had an active role in passing on disinformation, which resurfaced in various forms in French newspapers. The general trend of this disinformation was to present the renewed fighting in 1993 as something completely new (although conflict between the FAR and the RP had been taking place since 1990) and as a straightforward foreign invasion, the rebel RPF being presented merely as Ugandans under a different guise. The disinformation played its role in preparing the ground for increased French involvement during the final stages of both the genocide and the war.
- During 1989–97, DGSE helped many Chinese dissidents who participated in the Tiananmen Square protests of 1989 escape to western countries as a part of Operation Yellowbird.
- During the Kosovo War, the DGSE played an active role in providing weapons training for the KLA. According to British wartime intercepts of Serbian military communication, DGSE officers took part in active fighting against Serbian forces. It was even revealed that several DGSE officers had been killed alongside KLA fighters in a Serbian ambush.
- Reports in 2006 have credited DGSE operatives for infiltrating and exposing the inner workings of Afghan training camps during the 1990s. One of the spies employed by the agency later published a work under the pseudonym "Omar Nasiri", uncovering details of his life inside Al-Qaeda.

==== 2000s ====
- A DGSE general heads the Alliance Base, a joint CTIC set up in Paris in cooperation with the CIA and other intelligence agencies. Alliance Base is known for having been involved in the arrest of Christian Ganczarski.
- In 2003, the DGSE was held responsible for the outcome of Opération 14 juillet, a failed mission to rescue Íngrid Betancourt Pulecio from FARC rebels in Colombia.
- In 2004, the DGSE was credited for liberating two French journalists, Georges Malbrunot and Christian Chesnot, who were held as hostages for 124 days in Iraq.
- DGSE personnel were part of a team that arranged the release on 12 June 2005, of French journalist Florence Aubenas, held hostage for five months in Iraq.
- DGSE was said to be involved in the arrest of the two presumed killers of four French tourists in Mauritania in January 2006.
- In 2006, the French newspaper L'Est Républicain acquired an apparently leaked DGSE report to the French president Jacques Chirac claiming that Osama bin Laden had died in Pakistan on 23 August 2006, after contracting typhoid fever. The report had apparently been based on Saudi Arabian intelligence. These "death" allegations were thereafter denied by the French foreign minister Philippe Douste-Blazy and Saudi authorities, as well as CIA Bin Laden specialist Michael Scheuer.
- In 2007–10, DGSE undertook an extensive operation to track est. 120 Al-Qaeda terrorists in FATA region of Pakistan.

==== 2010s ====
- November 2010, three operatives from DGSE's Service Operations (SO) (formerly Service 7) botched an operation to burgle the room of China Eastern Airlines' boss Shaoyong Liu at the Crowne Plaza Hotel in Toulouse. Failure of the operation resulted in the suspension of all of SO's activities and the very survival of the unit was called into question. SO only operates on French soil, where it mounts secret HUMINT operations such as searching hotel rooms, opening mail or diplomatic pouches.
- In the year 2010/11, the DGSE has been training agents of Bahrain's National Security, the intelligence service which is trying to subdue the country's Shi'ite opposition protests. Bahrain's Special Security Force also benefits from a French advisor seconded from the Police Nationale who is training the Special Security Force in modern anti-riot techniques.
- March 2011, the DGSE sent several members of the Service Action to support the Libyan rebels. However, most of the agents deployed were from the Direction des Operations' Service Mission. The latter unit gathers intelligence and makes contact with fighting factions in crisis zones.
- In January 2013, Service Action members attempted to rescue one of its agents held hostage by al-Shabaab in Somalia. The rescue was a failure as the hostage was killed alongside 2 DGSE operators.
- In 2014, DGSE in a joint operation with AIVD, had successfully infiltrated and planted hidden cameras in Cyber Operations Center under SVR in Russia.
  - The DGSE, with the NDS, ran a joint intelligence unit in Afghanistan known as "Shamshad" until the Taliban captured Kabul.
- In 2017, DGSE concluded that Russia sought to influence France's 2017 presidential elections by generating social media support for the far-right candidate.
- In 2017–19, Action Division assassinated 3 major terrorist leaders of JNIM
- In 2018–19, DGSE in a joint operation with CIA, DGSI, MI6 and FIS, tracked and identified 15 members of the Unit 29155, who were using Chamonix as a 'base camp' to conduct covert operations around Europe.
- In 2020, DGSE along with CIA, had supplied the intelligence to COS, in their operation to kill Abdelmalek Droukdel.

=== DGSE officers or alleged officers ===
Notable DGSE officers or alleged officers
Name(s)	Status and known actions
Marc Aubrière	An officer who was kidnapped by Al-Shabaab militia in Somalia in 2009 and managed to escape.
Denis Allex	An officer who was kidnapped by Al-Shabaab militia in Somalia in 2009. He was killed on 11 January 2013, by the militants during a failed rescue attempt.
Guillaume Didier	An officer of the Action Division who disappeared in 2003 following the failure of a DGSE operation in Morocco.
Philippe de Dieuleveult	A supposed DGSE agent who mysteriously disappeared during an expedition in Zaire in 1985.
Hervé Jaubert	A former French navy officer and DGSE agent who moved to Dubai in 2004 to build recreational submarines. Following allegations of fraud, his passport was confiscated in 2008. Jaubert escaped on a dinghy to India and resurfaced in Florida in the U.S. where he filed a lawsuit against Dubai World.
Roland Verge	Chief Petty Officer involved in the Rainbow Warrior operation, arrested in Australia, escaped by French submarine
Gérard Andries	Petty Officer involved in the Rainbow Warrior operation, arrested in Australia, escaped by French submarine
Michel Bartelo	Petty Officer involved in the Rainbow Warrior operation, arrested in Australia, escaped by French submarine
Louis-Pierre Dillais	Commander of the Rainbow Warrior operation, as acknowledged on New Zealand television
Alain Mafart and Dominique Prieur	Two DGSE officers who took part to the sinking of the Rainbow Warrior and who were subsequently arrested by New Zealand police.
Xavier Maniguet	A former DGSE agent who also took part in the sinking of the Rainbow Warrior.
Pierre Martinet	A former DGSE agent, who retired after having his cover blown while watching Islamist militants in London. Martinet later wrote a book uncovering details of how the DGSE planned its assassination of political targets. He was subsequently sentenced to six months in prison for divulging defence secrets.
Bernard Nut	A French Army officer and DGSE agent responsible for actions conducted in the Côte d'Azur and Middle East regions, and whose assassination in 1985 made headlines in French media.
Philippe Rondot	A retired French army general and former councilor in charge of coordinating foreign intelligence for the French ministry of defence.
Gérard Royal	A former DGSE agent accused of being a Rainbow Warrior bomber and brother of French presidential candidate Ségolène Royal.
Alain Juillet	A former five year parachutist officer of the Service Action (SA) in the 1960s who from 2002 to 2009 lead a reorganization of DGSE as second to DGSE chief Pierre Brochant, lead as director of intelligence DGSE for one year, and was a senior official of economic intelligence in DGSE. He is a very pro-Kremlin and very pro-Vladimir Putin supporter with his own show "La Source", which began airing in March 2020, on RT France which is France's version of the Russian state controlled RT.

== In popular culture ==
The DGSE has been referenced in the following media:

- In the video game James Bond 007: Nightfire (2002) James Bond works alongside operative Dominique Paradis.
- The Bureau (2015–2020), Canal+ television series about the lives of DGSE agents.
- In the Marvel Cinematic Universe, the villain character of Georges Batroc (appearing in both Captain America: The Winter Soldier (2014) and The Falcon and the Winter Soldier (2021) was an agent of the DGSE, Action Division, before being demobilized, although he is of Algerian descent, not French.
- Secret Defense (2008 film)
- Secret Agents (2004 film)
- Godzilla (1998), a film which features Jean Reno as a DGSE agent in a major role.
- The Night Agent, a television series which features the DGSE in season two episode 6
- A Very Secret Service (2015-2018) a sitcom starring Hugo Becker as André Merlaux as an agent of the DSGE during the Cold War.

== See also ==
- General Directorate for Internal Security
- List of intelligence agencies of France
- Bob Denard, a French mercenary
