= Domme =

Domme may refer to:

- Domme, Dordogne, commune of the Dordogne département, in southwestern France
- Dominatrix, female professional who takes the dominant role in BDSM activities
