= Château de Caudon =

Château in France

Coordinates: 44°49′23″N 1°14′12″E

The Château de Caudon is a château located near the town of Domme, in the Dordogne Department of the region of Aquitaine in France.

Located on a hill above the left bank of the Dordogne, the château dates to the Louis XVI-French Empire period. A Garden à la française and French landscape garden were created around the chateau between 1808 and 1814 by the Marquis Jacques de Malville, one of the authors of the French Civil Code. The garden features an alley of thirty-two plane trees, all nearly two hundred years old; a topiary garden of boxwood hedges, and labyrinth; a Cedar of Lebanon tree and a giant sequoia. The gardens are classified by the French Ministry of Culture as one of the notable gardens of France.
