= The French anti-Jihadism media campaign =

The French anti-Jihadism media campaign was a media campaign launched on 18 November 2016, the campaign took place on several social network such as Facebook, Twitter or Instagram. One of the result on this campaign was also the creation of an official governmental website which should aim to discourage the potential candidates for Jihad. The decision to launch the campaign was taken after the wave of terrorist attack that faced France during the years 2015 and 2016.

== History ==
The Jihadist movement has deep roots on the French soil, according to the French authorities and the DGSE (La Direction générale de la Sécurité extérieure), the French intelligence agency estimate that some 1,200 people are involved in jihadist circles with several hundred having traveled to Syria and Iraq - more than have left from any other Western nation. The presence of potential candidates for Jihad on its soil has become a key issue for the French national security, the radicalization of the youth in certain areas is now a priority for the French authorities and represent a permanent threat, indeed, there is a state of emergency in France since 13 November 2015.

A part of the media campaign was more precisely dedicated to the so call Interactive internet campaign, which promoted governmental videos showing the reality of the Jihadist movement in Syria and Irak. This campaign directly targeted the Islamic State (Daesh) by undermining its influence on the internet.

== Objectives ==
The objectives of this media campaign were to undermine and diminish the influence of the Jihadists on the internet, it aimed to prevent the youth to be convinced by the Jihadist messages that are present on the web. The latest videos published on the governmental website were interactives in order for the viewer to have the most realistic experience possible of the process of recruitment for the Jihad. The videos represent the stories of a boy and a girl tempted by radicalisation and who are being recruited by Jihadists, the videos tend to show the reality of the situation in Syria, the impact and the damages cause to person's family if this person decide to leave for Syria. The message of the videos is very clear "You are responsible for your choices," the site tells viewers adding the message, "radicalisation can destroy your family, your life and those of others".
