= Football at the 2017 Central American Games – Men's team squads =

These are the squad listings for the men's teams at the 2017 Central American Games.

== Belize ==
Head coach: (Poland) Richard Orlowski

No.	Pos.	Player	Date of birth (age)	Club
1	GK	Yusef Guerra		(Football Federation of Belize) Verdes
4	DF	Sammy Sosa		(Football Federation of Belize) Z-Boyz Jrs
5	DF	Norman Anderson		(Football Federation of Belize) Belmopan Bandits
7	MF	Rene Leslie		(Football Federation of Belize) Belmopan Bandits
8	MF	Dorwin Logan		(Football Federation of Belize) Wagiya
10	FW	Camilo Sanchez		(Football Federation of Belize) Police United
11	FW	Carlos Gonzalez		(Football Federation of Belize) Belmopan Bandits
12	FW	Krisean Lopez		(Football Federation of Belize) Wagiya
13	MF	Elston Augustin		(Football Federation of Belize) Verdes
14	MF	Latrell Meddleton		(Football Federation of Belize) Wagiya
16	MF	Davis Marshall		(Football Federation of Belize) Wagiya
17	MF	Kyle Thomas		(Football Federation of Belize) Police United
18	MF	Alexander Scott		(Football Federation of Belize) Belmopan Bandits
20	DF	Ainsleigh Perez		(Football Federation of Belize) Belmopan Bandits
23	DF	Eugene Martinez		(Football Federation of Belize) Belize Defence Force
27	GK	Devin Nunez		(Football Federation of Belize) Belmopan Bandits
28	DF	Dale Pelayo		(Football Federation of Belize) Belmopan Bandits
29	FW	Jaren Lambey		(Football Federation of Belize) Belize Defence Force

== Costa Rica ==
Head coach: (Argentina) Mauricio Herrera

No.	Pos.	Player	Date of birth (age)	Club
1	GK	Alejandro Barrientos		(Costa Rican Football Federation) Guadalupe F.C.
2	DF	Esteban Espinoza		(Costa Rican Football Federation) C.S. Herediano
3	DF	Pablo Arbone		(Costa Rican Football Federation) Santos de Guápiles F.C.
4	DF	Kevin Espnoza		(Costa Rican Football Federation) Guadalupe F.C.
5	DF	Esteban Gonzalez		(Costa Rican Football Federation) C.S. Uruguay de Coronado
6	MF	Luis Hernandez		(Costa Rican Football Federation) A.D.M.Grecia F.C.
7	MF	Greivin Marchena		(Costa Rican Football Federation) Deportivo Saprissa
8	DF	Suhander Zuniga		(Costa Rican Football Federation) A.D. Carmelita
9	FW	Andy Reyes		(Mexican Football Federation) Pachuca
10	MF	Jonathan Martinez		(Costa Rican Football Federation) A.D. Carmelita
11	MF	Barlon Seoqueira		(Costa Rican Football Federation) Liga Deportiva Alajuelense
12	MF	Daniel Villegas		(Costa Rican Football Federation) A.D.J. Escazuceña
13	DF	Alexis Gamboa		(Costa Rican Football Federation) Santos de Guápiles F.C.
14	DF	Roberto Cordoba		(Costa Rican Football Federation) A.D.M. Grecia F.C.
15	MF	Bernald Alfaro		(Costa Rican Football Federation) A.D. Carmelita
16	MF	Eduardo Juarez		(Costa Rican Football Federation) Guadalupe F.C.
17	FW	Jostin Daly		(Costa Rican Football Federation) Guadalupe F.C.
18	GK	Diego Rivas		(Costa Rican Football Federation) C.S. Cartaginés

== Nicaragua ==
Head coach: (Nicaragua) Mario Alfaro

No.	Pos.	Player	Date of birth (age)	Club
1	GK	Brandon Mayorga		(Nicaraguan Football Federation) Diriangén FC
2	DF	Jorge Montano		(Nicaraguan Football Federation) UNAN
3	DF	Jason Ingram		(Nicaraguan Football Federation) Juventus Managua
4	DF	Oscar Acevedo		(Nicaraguan Football Federation) Real Esteli
5	DF	Henry Niño		(Nicaraguan Football Federation) Diriangén FC
6	DF	David Jaroun		(Nicaraguan Football Federation) Diriangén FC
7	FW	Luis Peralta		(United States Soccer Federation) U.D Miami FC
8	MF	Jonathan Moncada		(Nicaraguan Football Federation) Real Esteli
9	FW	Abner Acuña		(Nicaraguan Football Federation) Diriangén FC
10	MF	Agenor Baez		(Nicaraguan Football Federation) Managua F.C.
11	FW	Ariagner Smith		(Nicaraguan Football Federation) Real Esteli
12	GK	Andre Wangar		(United States Soccer Federation) San Jose Earthquakes
13	FW	Andersson Acosta		(Nicaraguan Football Federation) UNAN
14	MF	Hayder Calero		(Nicaraguan Football Federation) Sebaco
15	FW	Denis Berger		(Nicaraguan Football Federation) Juventus Managua
16	DF	Camper Perez		(Nicaraguan Football Federation) Masachapa FC
17	DF	Alfredo Lopez		(Nicaraguan Football Federation) Real Esteli
18	DF	Rony Ruiz		(Nicaraguan Football Federation) Deportivo Ocotal

== El Salvador ==
Head coach: (Colombia) Eduardo Lara

No.	Pos.	Player	Date of birth (age)	Club
1	GK	Mario Martinez		(Salvadoran Football Federation) C.D. Luis Ángel Firpo
2	DF	Diego Chevez		(Salvadoran Football Federation) Turín FESA F.C.
3	DF	Edwin Fuentes		(Salvadoran Football Federation) EF San Pablo Tacachico
4	DF	Romulo Villalobos		(Salvadoran Football Federation) C.D. Aguila
5	DF	Joaquin Lozano		(Salvadoran Football Federation) C.D. Luis Ángel Firpo
6	MF	Diego Cartagena		(Salvadoran Football Federation) EF San Pablo Tacachico
7	MF	Amilcar Bermudez		(Salvadoran Football Federation) C.D. Luis Ángel Firpo
8	MF	Enrique Contreras		(Salvadoran Football Federation) Alianza F.C.
9	FW	Ronald Cerritos		(United States Soccer Federation) D.C. United Academy
10	FW	Marvin Marouez		(Salvadoran Football Federation) C.D. Municipal Ilopaneco
11	FW	Jonathan Aguilar		(Salvadoran Football Federation) C.D. Sonsonate
12	MF	Derek Sanchez		(Salvadoran Football Federation) San Rafael Cedros
13	DF	Alexis Montes		(Salvadoran Football Federation) Alianza F.C.
14	MF	Kevin Ramos		(Salvadoran Football Federation) C.D. Dragon
15	MF	Hector Quinteros		(Salvadoran Football Federation) C.D. Dragon
16	DF	Diego Chavez		(Salvadoran Football Federation) Turín FESA F.C.
17	DF	Gerardo Guirola		(Salvadoran Football Federation) A.D. Isidro Metapan
18	GK	Milton Diaz		(Salvadoran Football Federation) C.D. Dragon

== Honduras ==
Head coach: (Honduras) Carlos Tábora

No.	Pos.	Player	Date of birth (age)	Club
1	GK	Javier Delgado	6 November 1998 (aged 19)	(National Autonomous Federation of Football of Honduras) C.D. Honduras Progreso
2	DF	Denil Maldonado	26 May 1998 (aged 19)	(National Autonomous Federation of Football of Honduras) F.C. Motagua
3	DF	Wesly Decas	11 August 1999 (aged 18)	(Mexican Football Federation) FC Juárez
5	DF	Dylan Andrade	8 March 1998 (aged 19)	(National Autonomous Federation of Football of Honduras) C.D. Honduras Progreso
6	DF	Riky Zapata	23 November 1997 (aged 20)	(National Autonomous Federation of Football of Honduras) C.D. Real Sociedad
7	MF	José Reyes	5 November 1997 (aged 20)	(National Autonomous Federation of Football of Honduras) C.D. Olimpia
8	MF	Kervin Arriaga	5 January 1998 (aged 19)	(National Autonomous Federation of Football of Honduras) Platense
9	MF	Foslyn Grant	4 October 1998 (aged 19)	(National Autonomous Federation of Football of Honduras) F.C. Motagua
10	MF	Carlos Mejía	19 February 2000 (aged 17)	(National Autonomous Federation of Football of Honduras) C.D.S. Vida
11	MF	José Pinto	27 September 1997 (aged 20)	(National Autonomous Federation of Football of Honduras) C.D. Olimpia
12	GK	Michael Perelló	11 July 1998 (aged 19)	(National Autonomous Federation of Football of Honduras) C.D. Marathón
14	MF	Sendel Cruz	13 December 1998 (aged 18)	(National Autonomous Federation of Football of Honduras) Juticalpa F.C.
15	DF	Jálex Sánchez	28 March 1997 (aged 20)	(National Autonomous Federation of Football of Honduras) Real C.D. España
16	DF	José García	21 September 1998 (aged 19)	(National Autonomous Federation of Football of Honduras) C.D. Olimpia
17	FW	Byron Rodríguez	26 August 1997 (aged 20)	(National Autonomous Federation of Football of Honduras) Parrillas One
18	FW	Denilson Castillo	29 April 1998 (aged 19)	(National Autonomous Federation of Football of Honduras) F.C. Motagua
19	FW	Douglas Martínez	5 June 1997 (aged 20)	(United States Soccer Federation) New York Red Bulls II
20	MF	Jorge Álvarez	20 January 1998 (aged 19)	(National Autonomous Federation of Football of Honduras) C.D. Olimpia

== Panama ==
Head coach: (Panama) Jorge Dely Valdes

No.	Pos.	Player	Date of birth (age)	Club
1	GK	Samuel Baptista		(Panamanian Football Federation) Azuero F.C.
2	DF	Samir Ramirez		(Panamanian Football Federation) Chorrillo F.C.
3	DF	Jorge Gutierrez		(Panamanian Football Federation) Tauro F.C.
4	DF	Jiovany Ramos		(Panamanian Football Federation) San Francisco F.C.
5	MF	Edgar Cunningham		(Panamanian Football Federation) Arabe Unido
6	DF	Javier Rivera		(Panamanian Football Federation) Tauro F.C.
7	MF	Alberto Quinones		(Panamanian Football Federation) Alianza
8	MF	Adalberto Carrasouilla		(Panamanian Football Federation) Tauro F.C.
9	FW	Lleandro Ávila		(United States Soccer Federation) Iowa Western College
10	MF	Angel Orelien		(Panamanian Football Federation) Sporting
11	MF	Chamel Asprilla		(Panamanian Football Federation) Arabe Unido
12	GK	Isaul Espinosa		(Panamanian Football Federation) Plaza Amador
13	DF	Gabriel Brown		(Panamanian Football Federation) Arabe Unido
14	DF	Cesar Blackman		(Slovak Football Association) FC DAC 1904 Dunajská Streda
15	MF	Carlos Kirton		(Panamanian Football Federation) Independiente F.C.
16	FW	Isidoro Hinestroza		(Panamanian Football Federation) San Francisco F.C.
17	MF	Eduardo Guerrero		(Panamanian Football Federation) Chorrillo F.C.
18	FW	Damaso Santos		(Panamanian Football Federation) Plaza Amador
