= Brochand =

Brochand is a French surname. Notable people with the surname include:

- Bernard Brochand (1938–2025), French politician
- Pierre Brochand (born 1941), French diplomat, brother of Bernard
