= Constant Marie =

French communard, shoemaker, anarchist and poet

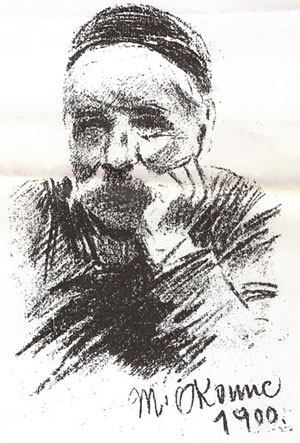
- 1900 portrait
- Born: 17 August 1838; Sainte-Houvrince, Calvados, France
- Died: 17 August 1910 (aged 72)
- Occupations: Mason, shoemaker
- Known for: Anarchist songs

Constant Marie, known as Le Père Lapurge (17 August 1838 – 5 August 1910) was a French Communard, shoemaker, anarchist and poet. He was the author of several popular revolutionary songs.

== Early years ==
Constant Marie was born on 27 August 1838 in Sainte-Houvrince, Calvados. He began work as a bricklayer. He participated in the Paris Commune, and was wounded in the fighting at the Vanves fort.

== Anarchist shoemaker and songwriter ==
Due to his injuries Constant Marie was forced to change occupation to become a shoemaker. He became an anarchist and began to compose revolutionary songs. Within twelve years of the fall of the commune in 1871, Constant Marie's songs had become very popular in some circles. Constant Marie often performed at festivities of anarchist groups. He came to the attention of the police, who searched his house on 1 July 1894 and seized books and the texts of his songs. He was arrested and charged with "membership of a criminal conspiracy." He spent several weeks in the Mazas Prison before his conditional release, and remained under police surveillance until 1905. As a young man the anarchist, journalist and then Communist activist Fernand Desprès (1879–1949) worked as a shoemaker with Constant Marie.

Constant Marie died on 5 August 1910.

== Works ==
Le Père Lapurge ("Father Purge") was published in 1886 in the Calais anarchist newspaper La Révolte des Affamés. Constant Marie's other well-known songs included Dame dynamite and La Muse rouge. This last gave its name in 1901 to a famous group of revolutionary poets and singers. By 1891 he was also known for Révolté, Jacques normand, Tocsin and Affranchie. His songs continued to be performed in cabarets after the turn of the century.

== Sources ==
- Gegout, E. (1891). Prison fin de siècle. Charpentier. p. 179.
- Godin, Noël (2008). "Constant Marie". Anthologie de la subversion carabinée. L'AGE D'HOMME. ISBN 978-2-8251-3805-2.
- "MARIE Constant [dit Le Père Lapurge]". Dictionnaire des anarchistes. Maitron. Archived from the original on 2015-04-02.
- Robin, François Paul (2014-10-25). "Monographie sur "·Fernand, Désiré, Alfred DESPRÉS dit A. Dubois·"". Itinéraire Gaston Couté (in French). Archived from the original on 2015-02-03. A slightly shorter version of this article was found on 2015-02-03 in the Dictionnaire des militants anarchistes dated 28 February 2007, signed "R.D.", and giving sources.)
- Tatum, Charles (2008-08-02). "Constant Marie, dit Le Père Lapurge". le vieux monde qui n'en finit pas (in French).
