= Membrolles =

- Part of Beauce la Romaine
- Location of Membrolles
- Location within France Location within Centre-Val de Loire
- Coordinates: 47.9856°N 1.4681°E
- Country: France
- Region: Centre-Val de Loire
- Department: Loir-et-Cher
- Arrondissement: Blois
- Canton: La Beauce
- Commune: Beauce la Romaine
- Area^{1}: 18.95 km^{2} (7.32 sq mi)
- Elevation: 129 m (423 ft)
- Highest elevation: 134 m (440 ft)
- Lowest elevation: 114 m (374 ft)
- Population (2022): 272
  - Density: 14.4/km^{2} (37.2/sq mi)
- Time zone: UTC+01:00 (CET)
  - Summer (DST): UTC+02:00 (CEST)
- Postal code: 41240
- ^{1} French Land Register data, which excludes lakes, ponds, glaciers > 1 km^{2} (0.386 sq mi or 247 acres) and river estuaries.

Membrolles (French pronunciation: [mɑ̃bʁɔl]) is a former commune in the Loir-et-Cher department of central France. On 1 January 2016, it was merged into the new commune of Beauce la Romaine. Its population was 272 in 2022.

== See also ==
- Communes of the Loir-et-Cher department
