= Semerville =

- Part of Beauce la Romaine
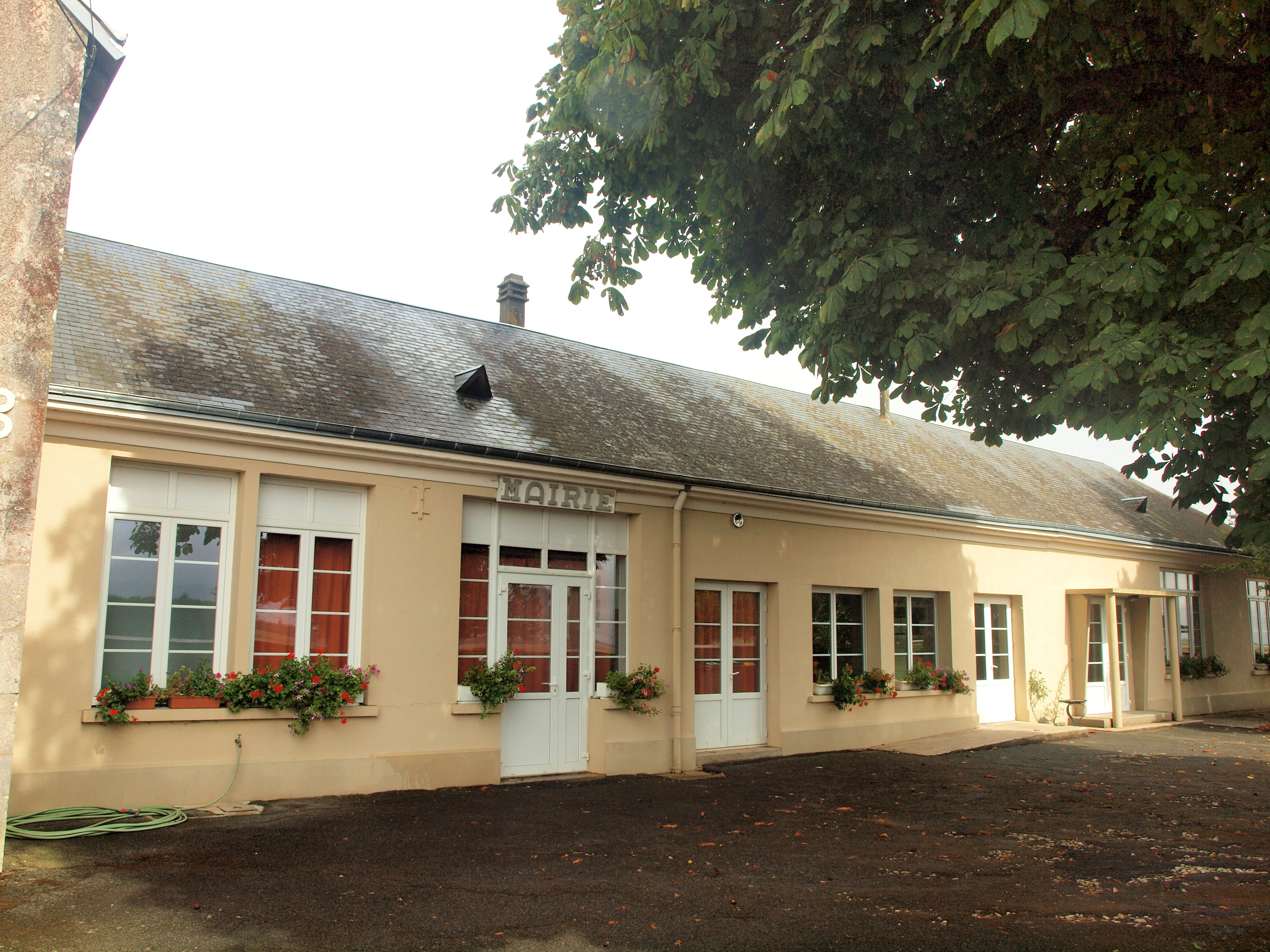
- Town hall

- Coat of arms
- Location of Semerville
- Location within France Location within Centre-Val de Loire
- Coordinates: 47°56′00″N 1°22′50″E
- Country: France
- Region: Centre-Val de Loire
- Department: Loir-et-Cher
- Arrondissement: Blois
- Canton: La Beauce
- Commune: Beauce la Romaine
- Area^{1}: 9.67 km^{2} (3.73 sq mi)
- Elevation: 131 m (430 ft)
- Highest elevation: 132 m (433 ft)
- Lowest elevation: 123 m (404 ft)
- Population (2022): 87
  - Density: 9.0/km^{2} (23/sq mi)
- Time zone: UTC+01:00 (CET)
  - Summer (DST): UTC+02:00 (CEST)
- Postal code: 41160
- ^{1} French Land Register data, which excludes lakes, ponds, glaciers > 1 km^{2} (0.386 sq mi or 247 acres) and river estuaries.

Semerville (French pronunciation: [səmɛʁvil]) is a former commune in the Loir-et-Cher department of central France. On 1 January 2016, it was merged into the new commune of Beauce la Romaine. Its population was 87 in 2022.

== See also ==
- Communes of the Loir-et-Cher department
