= Christiaan Cornelissen =

Dutch syndicalist (1864–1942)

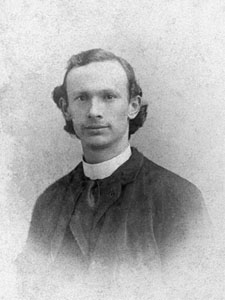
- Born: 30 August 1864 's-Hertogenbosch, Netherlands
- Died: 21 January 1942 (aged 77); Domme, France
- Political party: Social Democratic League
- Other political affiliations: National Labor Secretariat
- Movement: Syndicalism

Christiaan Gerardus Cornelissen (1864–1942) was a Dutch journalist and economist, and one of the leading figures of syndicalism in the Netherlands.

== Biography ==
Christiaan Gerardus Cornelissen was born on 30 August 1864, in the Dutch city of 's-Hertogenbosch, the second son of the carpenter Johannes Cornelissen and Mechelina van Wijk. He was educated at the Kweekschool voor onderwijzers in his home town. By the time he finished school, Cornelissen had renounced his native religion of Catholicism and taught himself how to speak the Latin and English languages. He then went into teaching, working at schools in Reek, Geertruidenberg and Middelburg. In the latter city, he joined a political club that agitated for universal suffrage, and began editing its newspaper Licht en Waarheid, publishing its first issue in May 1899.

He also became involved in trade unionism and his reading of Karl Marx attracted him to classical economics and the theories of socialism. He subsequently joined the Social Democratic League (SDB), becoming a member of its central council and co-editing its newspaper Recht voor Allen along with Ferdinand Domela Nieuwenhuis, together with whom he led the organisation's anti-parliamentary faction. By 1891, Cornelissen was already advocating for syndicalism and began calling on revolutionary socialists and social anarchists to form a united front based on a shared anti-parliamentary viewpoint. He attended the congresses of the Second International at Brussels (1891), Zürich (1893) and London (1896) as a delegate of the SDB. He pursued the resolutions of the Brussels congress to establish a national trade union centre in the Netherlands, which culminated in the formation of the National Labor Secretariat (NAS) in 1893.

In 1897, Cornelissen and Domela Nieuwenhuis left the SDB; they moved to France the following year. In October 1899, Cornelissen married Elisabeth Katharina Frederike Rupertus, with whom he had a son. In France, Cornelissen focused on his work in journalism and economics, largely falling out of contact with the Dutch workers' movement. From 1905, he co-edited the newspaper De Vrije Communist; from 1906, the magazine Grond en Vrijheid, and from 1911, the General Confederation of Labour (CGT)'s newspaper La Bataille syndicaliste. In 1907, he participated in the International Anarchist Congress of Amsterdam and established international links with syndicalists of other countries, culminating with their foundation of the Bulletin International du Mouvement Syndicaliste, which ran weekly issues until the outbreak of World War I in 1914. He was one of the signatories of the Manifesto of the Sixteen and attempted to win over Dutch supporters to the defencist position, but he was unsuccessful.

After the war, he became a regular contributor to Les Temps nouveaux and continued to write works of socialist economic theory. He and his wife divorced in 1922. He remained a leading figure in the international syndicalist movement throughout the 1920s and 1930s. Cornelissen died on 21 January 1942, in the southern French commune of Domme.

== Selected works ==
- Kritiek van een radicaal op Karl Marx (1891)
- Privaat bezit (1893)
- Het arbeidsloon, zijn vormen en zijn wetten (1910)
- Op weg naar een nieuwe maatschappij (1910)
- Het revolutionaire kommunisme (1985) [1896)

== See also ==
- Anarchism in the Netherlands

== Bibliography ==
- Lehning, Arthur (1987). "CORNELISSEN, Christianus Gerardus". Biographical Dictionary of Socialism and the Labour Movement in the Netherlands (in Dutch). International Institute of Social History. pp. 35–39.
