= Beauce la Romaine =

- Commune
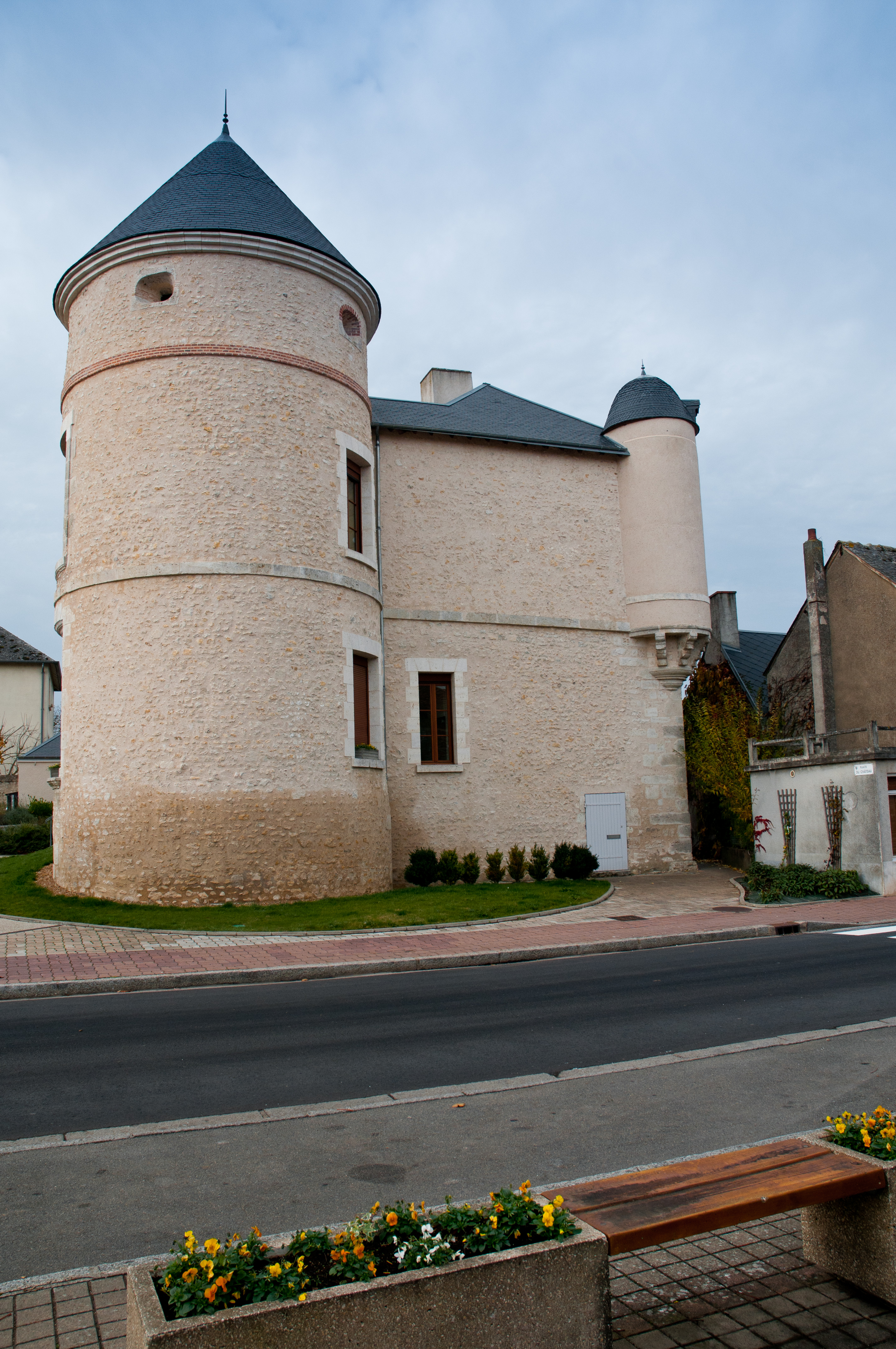
- Château d'Ouzouer-le-Marché
- Location of Beauce la Romaine
- Location within France Location within Centre-Val de Loire
- Coordinates: 47°54′43″N 1°31′30″E
- Country: France
- Region: Centre-Val de Loire
- Department: Loir-et-Cher
- Arrondissement: Blois
- Canton: La Beauce
- Intercommunality: Terres du Val de Loire

Government
  - Mayor (2020–2026): Bernard Espugna
- Area^{1}: 136.51 km^{2} (52.71 sq mi)
- Highest elevation: 153 m (502 ft)
- Lowest elevation: 107 m (351 ft)
- Population (2023): 3,341
  - Density: 24.47/km^{2} (63.39/sq mi)
- Time zone: UTC+01:00 (CET)
  - Summer (DST): UTC+02:00 (CEST)
- INSEE/Postal code: 41173 /41240, 41160
- ^{1} French Land Register data, which excludes lakes, ponds, glaciers > 1 km^{2} (0.386 sq mi or 247 acres) and river estuaries.

Beauce la Romaine (French pronunciation: [bos la ʁɔmɛn], literally Beauce the Roman) is a commune in the Loir-et-Cher department of central France. The municipality was established on 1 January 2016 by merger of the former communes of Ouzouer-le-Marché (the seat), La Colombe, Membrolles, Prénouvellon, Semerville, Tripleville and Verdes.

== Population ==
Population data refer to the commune in its geography as of January 2025.

Historical population
Year	Pop.	±% p.a.
1968	3,057	—
1975	2,869	−0.90%
1982	2,753	−0.59%
1990	2,630	−0.57%
1999	2,736	+0.44%
2007	3,151	+1.78%
2012	3,416	+1.63%
2017	3,484	+0.39%
2023	3,341	−0.70%
Source: INSEE

== See also ==
- Communes of the Loir-et-Cher department
