= Ouzouer-le-Marché =

- Part of Beauce la Romaine
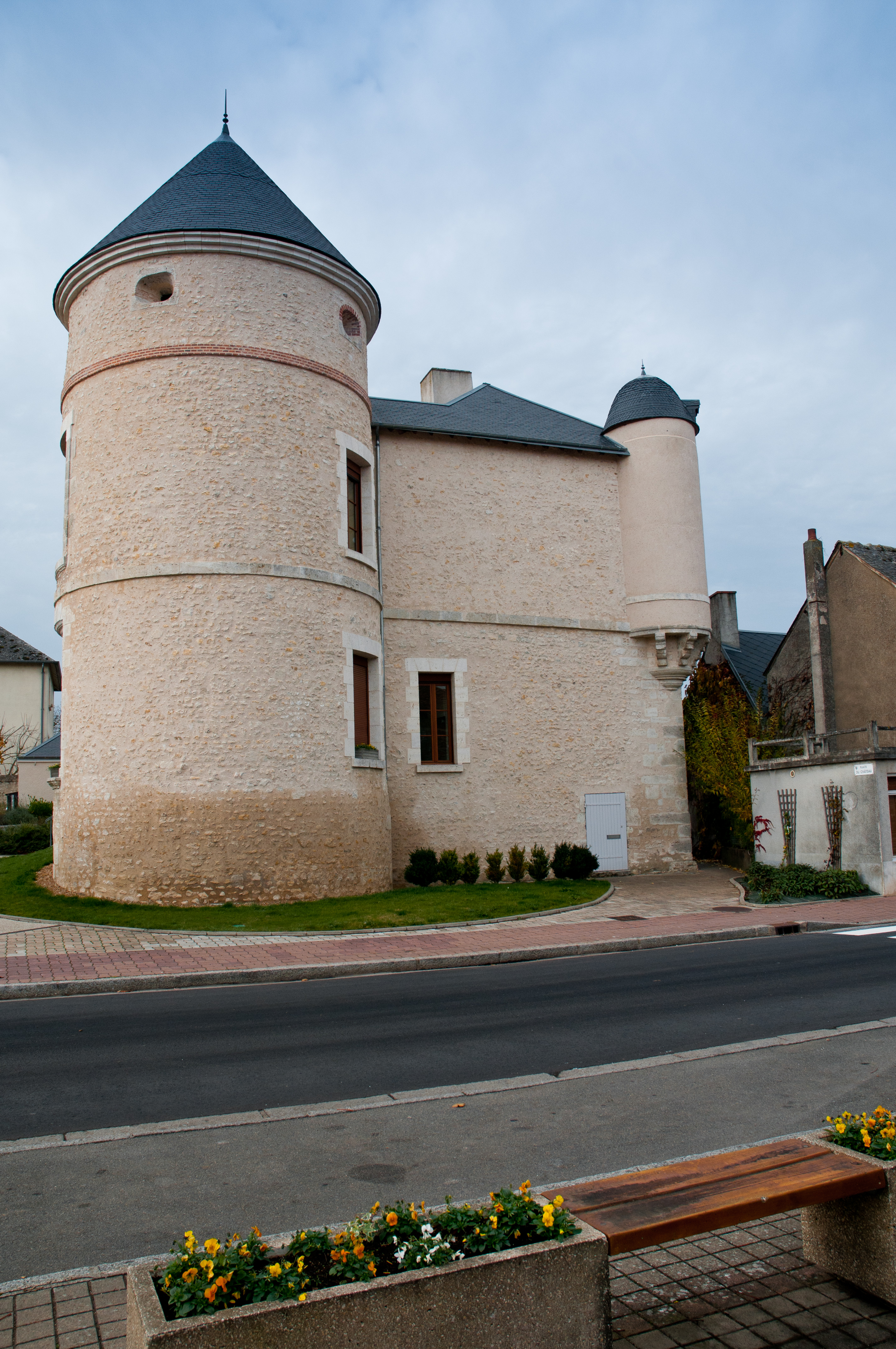
- The château in Ouzouer-le-Marché

- Coat of arms
- Location of Ouzouer-le-Marché
- Location within France Location within Centre-Val de Loire
- Coordinates: 47°54′43″N 1°31′42″E
- Country: France
- Region: Centre-Val de Loire
- Department: Loir-et-Cher
- Arrondissement: Blois
- Canton: La Beauce (chef-lieu)
- Commune: Beauce la Romaine
- Area^{1}: 28.10 km^{2} (10.85 sq mi)
- Elevation: 127 m (417 ft)
- Highest elevation: 136 m (446 ft)
- Lowest elevation: 118 m (387 ft)
- Population (2022): 1,974
  - Density: 70.25/km^{2} (181.9/sq mi)
- Time zone: UTC+01:00 (CET)
  - Summer (DST): UTC+02:00 (CEST)
- Postal code: 41240
- Website: www.ouzouerlemarche.fr
- ^{1} French Land Register data, which excludes lakes, ponds, glaciers > 1 km^{2} (0.386 sq mi or 247 acres) and river estuaries.

Ouzouer-le-Marché (French pronunciation: [uzwɛʁ lə maʁʃe]) is a former commune in the Loir-et-Cher department in north-central France. On 1 January 2016, it was merged into the new commune of Beauce la Romaine. Ouzouer-le-Marché is a dynamic rural town of nearly 2,000 inhabitants. It is the seat of the canton of La Beauce.

== History ==
There are several hypotheses of the origins of Ouzouer-le-Marché.

First hypothesis: Formerly in the Bronze Age, the town was called because of the swamps: Ouzouer le Marais. To pass these swamps, it was necessary to check uncouple the wagons where the market name to the wheels. According to historians, this marsh gave birth to a stream that flowed into the Loire by mauves, which seems unlikely today, the natural inclination is more towards water Tripleville.

Second hypothesis: In old registry, there are different spellings of the name: Ozoir, Auzoir, Auzouert and Ouzouer, this would be a Celtic name which would mean swamp. Indeed in 1850, instead of the church and the current location of the local school and the castle square, deep trenches connected one to another. The village is now between similar trenches, some to the north called the channel, the other south. The ground is so abundant with water over a clay layer that it doesn't allow to hollow caves, while in other parts you need to go down 80 feet for clean water.

Third hypothesis: Another version says that Ouzouer means Oratorium and is given to a large number of cities that has Saint Martin as patron, so Ouzouer-le-Marché, Ouzouer le Doyer, Ouzouer le Breuil et Ouzouer sur Loire have all Saint Martin as patron.

== Chateau d'Ouzouer le Marché ==
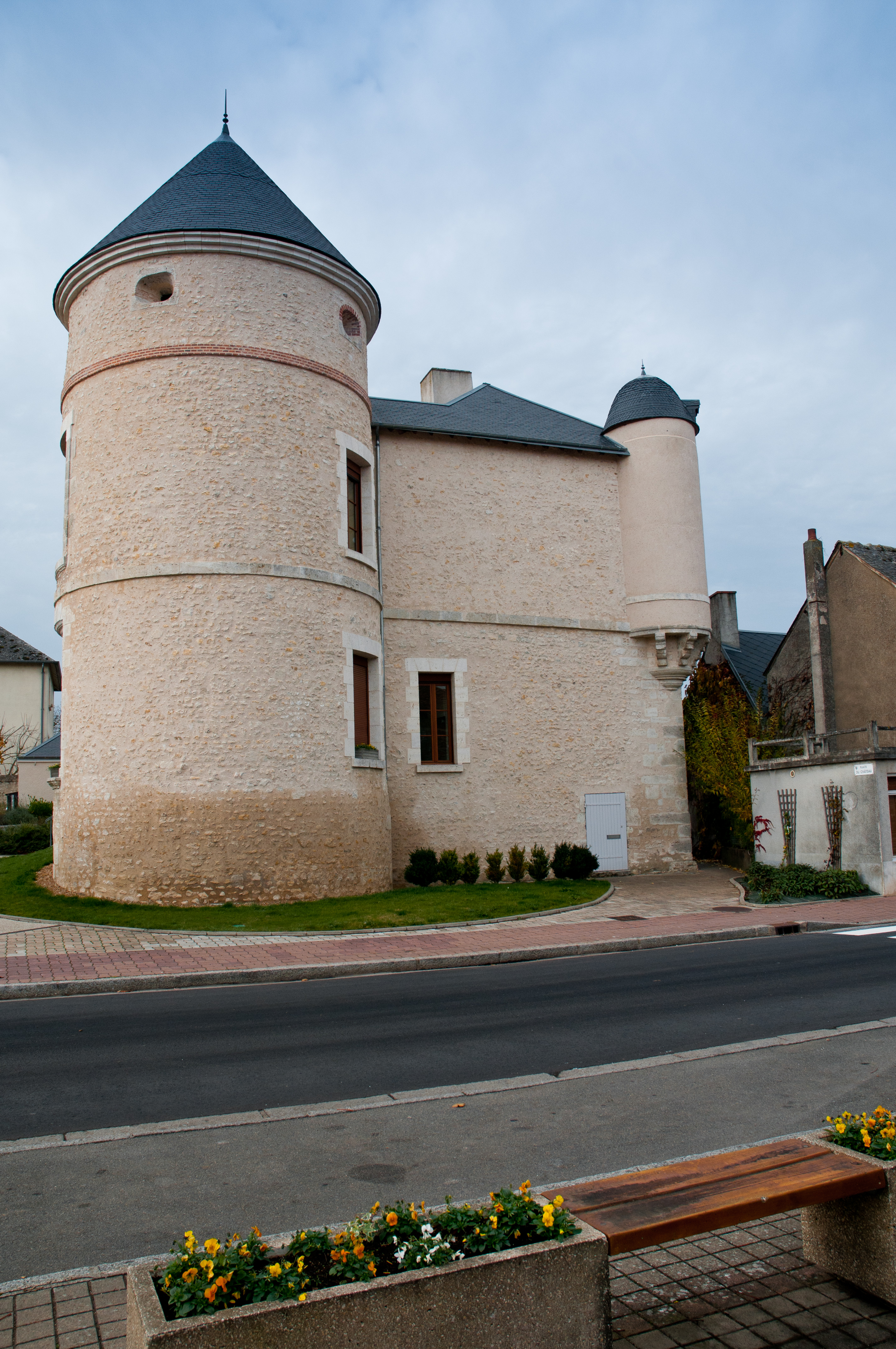

No document can date precisely the construction of the castle of Ouzouer le Marché. It was probably built in the fifteenth century, at the time of Orval Seignerie already possessed Seignerie Ouzouer in 1460. The Orval are the oldest lords of Ouzouer le Marché, they were the longest lords.

== The Cross of Chandry ==
This cross marks the site of an ancient cemetery. It is thought that there was a chapel or a wooden chapel around the cemetery. The oratory was replaced by a wooden cross towards the end of the fifteenth century by the current cross, probably by the monks of St Mesmin who owned several farms in the village.

During the revolution, some men came to Ouzouer-le-Marché and ransacked the church evoking their intention to spend the next day destroying the Cross of Chandry. Learning of this, three Malfray peasants, Grillon and Coulon, took off the cross and buried in a field on the night of 12 to 13 Prairial year II (from 3 to 4 June 1794)

After a strong storm, the three men delivered the cross up as attested to by the inscription: "Rebuilt in the year XI of the French Republic (1803) by Jean-Denis Malfray".

A legend tells that a lamb discovered the cross by going to kneel on a mound of earth where it was found.

On one side we see a beautiful representation of the Virgin and Child, and on the other side, Christ on the cross. Each branch ends with a lily. The Cross is listed in the inventory of Historical Monuments since February 2, 1962

It is located in Chandry at the crossroads of Ouzouer and Bizy.

== Geography ==
The town is located about 30 km from large cities such as Orléans and Blois and is close to the A10 motorway, on the borders of Beauce, Sologne and the Loire Valley. It is located around 120 kilometers from Paris and doesn't have any train stations. The nearest train stations are located in Meung-sur-Loire or Orléans.

== See also ==
- Communes of the Loir-et-Cher department
