= Marcelle Capy =

French writer and pacifist

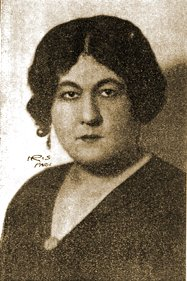
Marcelle Capy

Marcelle Capy is the pseudonym adopted by Marcelle Marquès (1891–1962), a French novelist, journalist, feminist and militant pacifist. She published a number of works from 1916 to 1950, all devoted to her interest in pacifism. She is remembered in particular for her award-winning Des hommes passèrent (Men Passed By), published in 1930. As a journalist, she contributed to many papers, especially La Vague which she co-founded in 1918. In the early 1930s, she was an active member of the Ligue internationale des combattants de la paix (International League of Fighters for Peace).

== Early life and education ==
Born on 16 March 1891 in Cherbourg, Eugénie Marie Marcelle Marquès was the second daughter of Jean Marquès, a naval officer, and his wife Marceline Capy. As a child, she frequently stayed with her maternal grandparents on their farm in Pradines in south-western France. She learnt about the futility of war from her grandfather who had fought in the Franco-Prussian War. She grew so close to her grandparents that she adopted their name, becoming Marcelle Capy.

She attended secondary school in Toulouse, matriculating with excellent results. Still in Toulouse, intending to become a teacher, she went on to take the preparatory classes for the École normale supérieure de Sèvres but, after listening to a lecture on Tolstoy by the socialist politician Jean Jaurès when she was 18, she decided instead to become a journalist in Paris. From then on, her life's work was to target pacifism, the role of women in contemporary society, and humanitarian socialism addressing in particular suffering and poverty.

== Career ==
She was soon contributing articles to a number of journals, including La Voix des femmes, the Journal du peuple and Hommes de jour. From September 1913, her articles in the trade union paper Bataille syndicaliste covered the dreadful conditions imposed on women working in France's weaving mills, based on her own experience of working beside them. In August 1915, together with her partner Fernand Desprès, she was forced to leave the Bataille syndicaliste which supported the pro-government Union sacrée during the First World War, while the couple remained ardent pacifists.

While continuing to write journal articles, in 1916 Capy published her first major work, Une voix de femme au-dessus de la mélée (A Women's Voice in the Fray) with a preface by Romain Rolland, criticising the glories of war and the heroism of soldiers. As a result of the First World War, the work was heavily censored. Similar works followed, including La défense de la vie (1918) and L'Amour roi (1925), the latter combining her neo-Christian beliefs with her focus on pacifism.

Her most successful work was the novel Des hommes passèrent which was awarded the Séverine prize in 1930. It tells the story of German prisoners working on French farms after the local workforce had been called to the front. A call for fraternity, it is set in Pradines where Capy has spent much of her childhood.

A competent public speaker, she participated in conferences in Europe, the United States and Canada. In 1924, she founded a pacifist education association called Les Amis de la Paix and attended the Women's International League for Peace and Freedom conference in Washington, D.C. In 1926, she addressed the Femmes pour la Paix et la Liberté conference in Geneva.

She continued to work as a journalist, but was denounced by the Nazis as a Communist in 1943 and her home in Pradines was raided. Back in Paris, in 1944 she contributed to the pacifist journal Germinal, writing human interest articles. After the war, she travelled to Egypt with her sister Jeanne Marquès, publishing L'Egypte au coeur du monde in 1950.

== Later life ==
In the late 1950s, she returned to her home in Pradines. She died there on 5 January 1962, after becoming a devout Christian in her later years. She is buried with her maternal relatives in the Pradines cemetery.

== See also ==
- List of peace activists
