= Erard Corbin de Mangoux =

Head of the DGSE
- In office 2008–2013
- President: Nicolas Sarkozy; François Hollande
- Preceded by: Pierre Brochand
- Succeeded by: Bernard Bajolet

Personal details
- Born: 6 January 1953 (age 73) Tübingen, Germany
- Education: Sciences Po

Erard Corbin de Mangoux (born 6 January 1953) is a French prefect and the former head of the Directorate-General for External Security (DSGE), France's foreign intelligence service.

== Career timeline ==
- Commissaire principal de la marine (1977-1988)
- Sous-directeur de l'administration générale et des finances à la direction de l'administration de la police nationale (1999-2004)
- Secrétaire général de la préfecture des Yvelines (2004-2006)
- Directeur général des services du département des Hauts-de-Seine (2006-2007)
- Préfet hors cadre (2007)
- Conseiller pour les affaires intérieures à l'Elysée (2007-2008)
