= Pierre Martinet =

French intelligence agent

Pierre Martinet is an ex-agent of DGSE, the French external intelligence agency. In 2005 he published the book La DGSE : service action, un agent sort de l'ombre (The DGSE, Action Service, An Agent Comes Out of the Shadow).

In an interview published in Swedish newspaper Aftonbladet on April 30, 2005, Martinet describes how the habits of assassination victims are mapped out by a preparatory team (which he was part of), for example by setting up illegal video surveillance. Other teams carry out the rest of the work. He asserts that "murder operations are no fantasies. They really exist. The final death sentence always comes from the top level. There is only one who can make that decision. The head of state. But that doesn't mean it always ends that way. [...]You don't think of what happened to the targets afterwards, if they have been "treated" or not."
