= Tripleville =

- Part of Beauce la Romaine
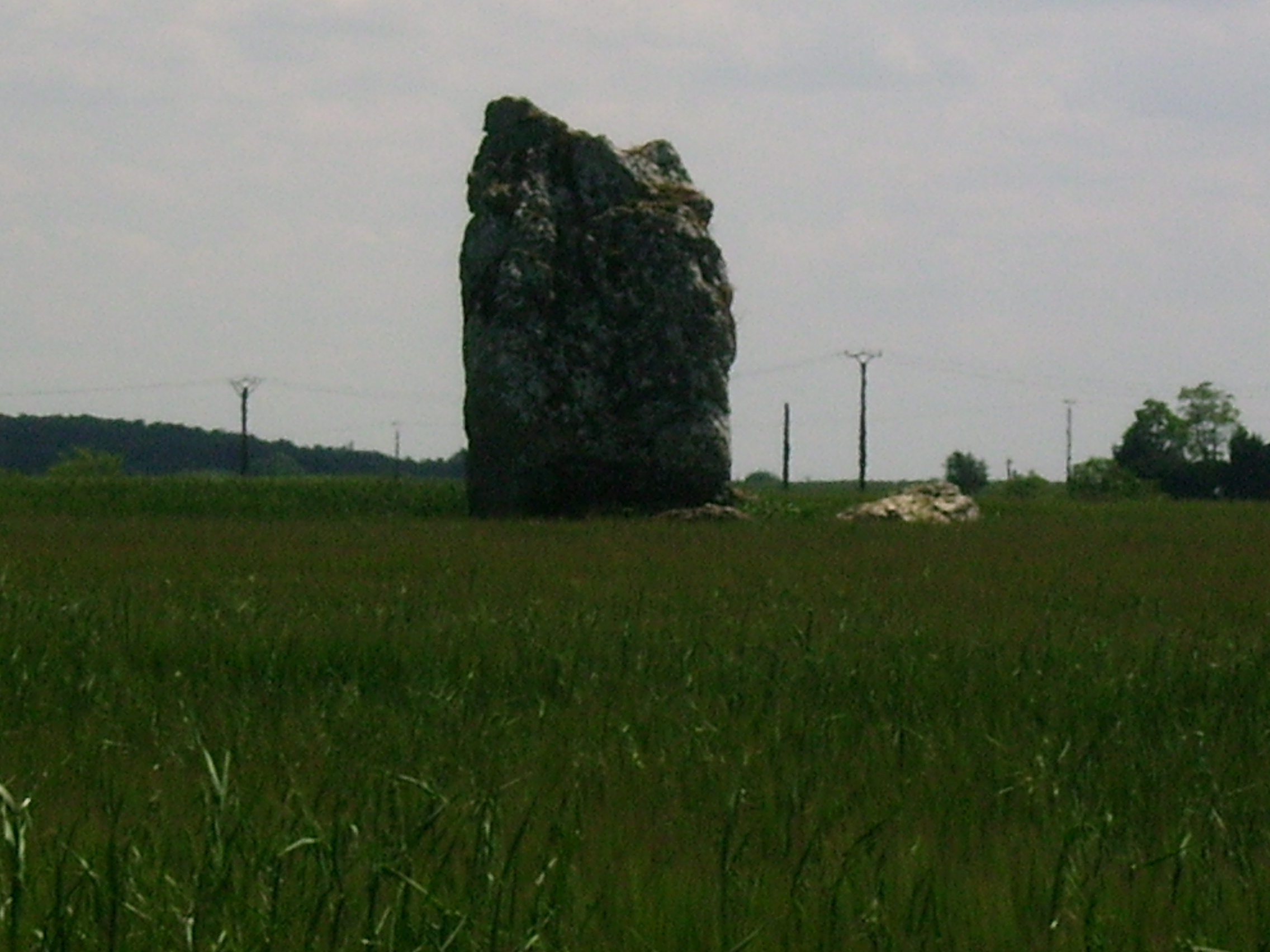
- The menhir of the Drue
- Location of Tripleville
- Location within France Location within Centre-Val de Loire
- Coordinates: 47°56′38″N 1°29′12″E
- Country: France
- Region: Centre-Val de Loire
- Department: Loir-et-Cher
- Arrondissement: Blois
- Canton: La Beauce
- Commune: Beauce la Romaine
- Area^{1}: 13.07 km^{2} (5.05 sq mi)
- Elevation: 118 m (387 ft)
- Highest elevation: 131 m (430 ft)
- Lowest elevation: 112 m (367 ft)
- Population (2022): 166
  - Density: 12.7/km^{2} (32.9/sq mi)
- Time zone: UTC+01:00 (CET)
  - Summer (DST): UTC+02:00 (CEST)
- Postal code: 41240
- ^{1} French Land Register data, which excludes lakes, ponds, glaciers > 1 km^{2} (0.386 sq mi or 247 acres) and river estuaries.

Tripleville (French pronunciation: [tʁipləvil]) is a former commune of the Loir-et-Cher department in central France. On 1 January 2016, it was merged into the new commune of Beauce la Romaine. Its population was 166 in 2022.

== See also ==
- Communes of the Loir-et-Cher department
