= La Bataille syndicaliste =

- Type: Daily
- Founded: 27 April 1911
- Ceased publication: 31 December 1920
- Language: French language
- City: Paris
- Circulation: 45500 (December 1912)
- ISSN: 1255-9814

La Bataille syndicaliste ('Syndicalist Battle'), renamed Bataille on 30 September 1915, was a syndicalist morning daily published from Paris. It was the central organ of the Confédération générale du travail (CGT).

== Publication history ==
The newspaper was founded in 1911. The founding nucleus of the newspaper consisted of Léon Jouhaux (secretary of the editorial bureau, representing the CGT), Harmel (joint secretary, representing postal workers), Dumas (treasurer, representing clothing workers) and Griffuelhes (administrator, representing leather and skin workers). Apart from editing La Bataille syndicaliste, the quartet also worked with the evening newspaper L'Intransigeant. The office of La Bataille syndicaliste was located at 10, boulevard Magenta. The first issue was published on April 27, 1911.

As of 1917 François Marie was the general secretary of the publication. Key contributors included Christiaan Cornelissen, J. Grave, L. Grandidier, Petr Kropotkin, P. Laval, E. Langevin, E. Le Guery and A. Violette. As of 1917 it claimed a circulation of 30,000.

== Notable contributors ==
Notable contributors have included:

- Marcelle Capy
- Georges Yvetot
- Henri Zisly
- Lucien Descaves
- Amédée Dunois
- Georges Eekhoud
- Sébastien Faure
- Victor Griffuelhes
- James Guillaume
- Léon Jouhaux
- Charles-Ange Laisant
- Charles Malato
- Octave Mirbeau
- Pierre Monatte
- Christiaan Cornelissen
- Alfred Rosmer
