= Verdes =

- Part of Beauce la Romaine
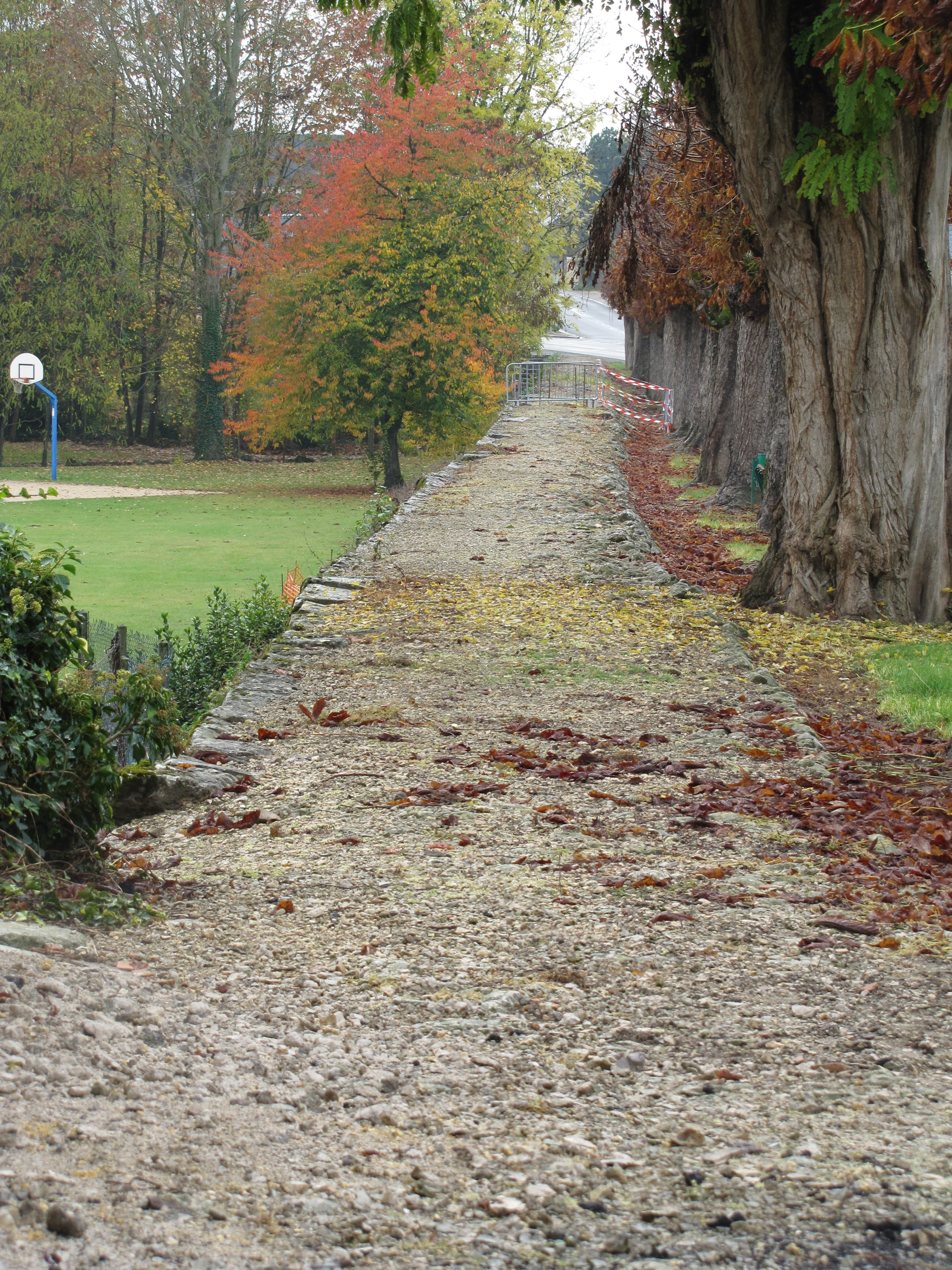
- The Roman road known as Julius Caesar Way, in Verdes

- Coat of arms
- Location of Verdes
- Location within France Location within Centre-Val de Loire
- Coordinates: 47°57′32″N 1°25′48″E
- Country: France
- Region: Centre-Val de Loire
- Department: Loir-et-Cher
- Arrondissement: Blois
- Canton: La Beauce
- Commune: Beauce la Romaine
- Area^{1}: 28.59 km^{2} (11.04 sq mi)
- Elevation: 125 m (410 ft)
- Highest elevation: 132 m (433 ft)
- Lowest elevation: 107 m (351 ft)
- Population (2022): 429
  - Density: 15.0/km^{2} (38.9/sq mi)
- Time zone: UTC+01:00 (CET)
  - Summer (DST): UTC+02:00 (CEST)
- Postal code: 41240
- ^{1} French Land Register data, which excludes lakes, ponds, glaciers > 1 km^{2} (0.386 sq mi or 247 acres) and river estuaries.

Verdes (French pronunciation: [vɛʁd]) is a former commune in the Loir-et-Cher department in central France. On 1 January 2016, it was merged into the new commune of Beauce la Romaine. Its population was 429 in 2022.

== See also ==
- Communes of the Loir-et-Cher department
