= Jean-Claude Mallet =

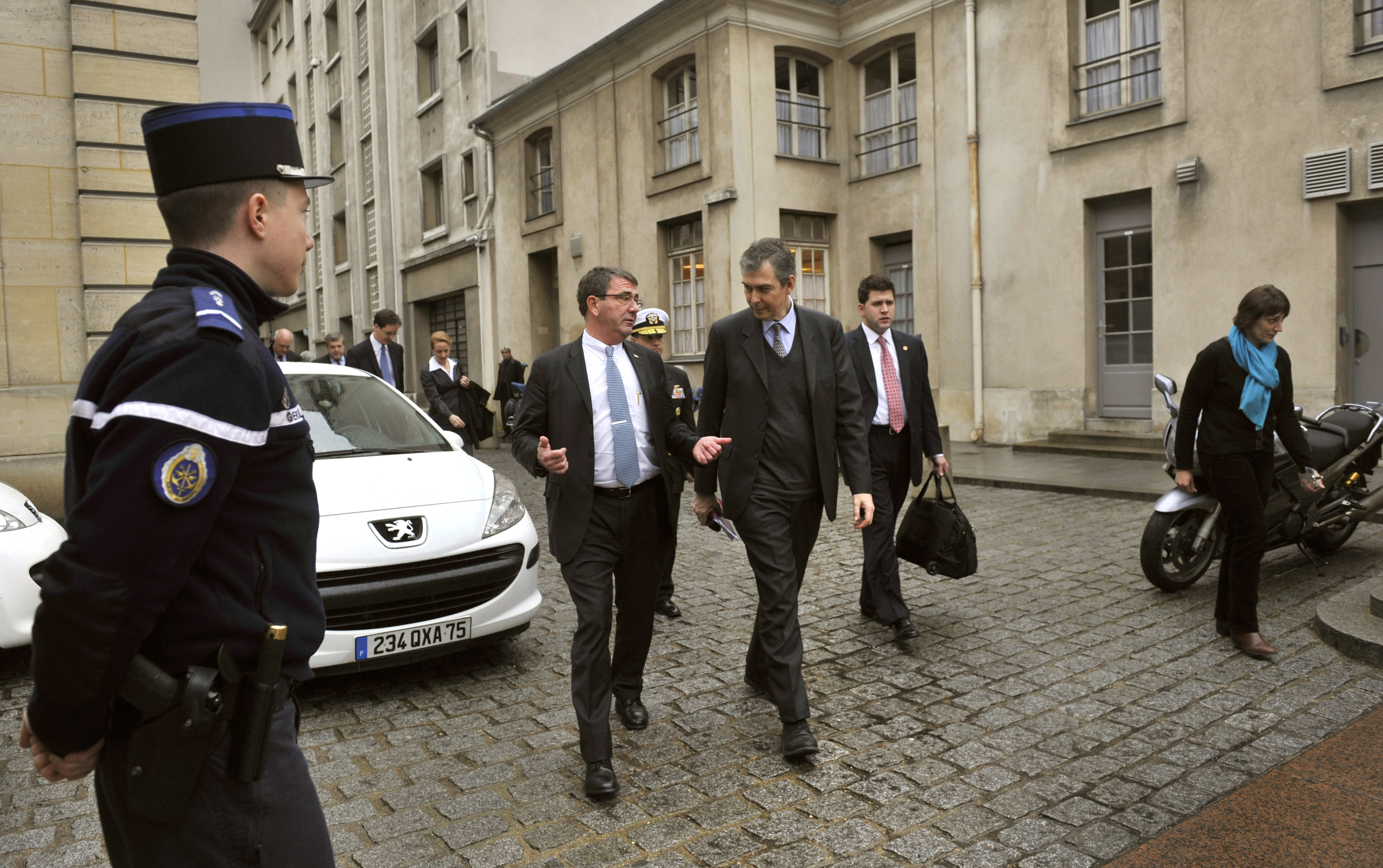
Deputy Secretary of Defense Ashton B. Carter, second from left, is escorted through the courtyard of the French Ministry of Defense by French senior political adviser Jean-Claude Mallet as they walk to a meeting in Paris, France, on Feb. 1, 2013.

Jean-Claude Mallet (born 25 March 1955) is a Special Adviser to the French Defence Minister and a member of the council of the International Institute for Strategic Studies. He was Secretary-General for National Defence from 1998 to 2004.

== Selected publications ==
- Flaubert à l'œuvre (with Raymonde Debray-Genette and Pierre-Marc de Biasi), Paris, Flammarion, 1993.
- La Défense, de la nation à l'Europe (ed.), Paris, La documentation française, 1996.
- Livre blanc sur la Défense et la Sécurité nationale ed., foreword by Nicolas Sarkozy), Paris, Odile Jacob, 2008.
- Livre blanc sur la Défense et la Sécurité nationale – les débats (ed.), Paris, Odile Jacob, 2008.
