= Pierre Brochand =

French diplomat and spy

Head of the DGSE
- In office 2002–2008
- President: Jacques Chirac; Nicolas Sarkozy
- Preceded by: Jean-Claude Cousseran
- Succeeded by: Erard Corbin de Mangoux

Personal details
- Born: 4 July 1941 (age 85) Cannes, France
- Education: HEC Paris, ÉNA

Pierre Brochand (born 4 July 1941, in Cannes) is a former director of the French Directorate-General for External Security (DGSE). He was previously a diplomat. He was a witness to Operation Frequent Wind and the Fall of Saigon in April 1975 at the end of the Vietnam War.

Alumnus of the École nationale d'administration (ENA), he is also a graduate of the École des Hautes Études Commerciales (HEC).

== Career ==
- central administration, 1968–1971
- First Secretary in Saigon, 1971–1973
- Counsellor in Saigon, 1973–1975
- Counsellor in Bangkok, 1975–1979
- Consul General in San Francisco, 1979–1982
- Deputy Director (Asia and Oceania), 1982–1985
- Deputy Permanent Representative of France to the United Nations in New York, 1985–1989
- French Ambassador to Hungary, 1989–1993
- French Ambassador in Israel, 1993–1995
- Director General cultural, scientific and technical, 1995–1998
- Diplomatic Adviser to the Government
- French Ambassador to Portugal, 1998–2002
- Director of the DGSE, 2002-2008

== Family ==
He is the brother of Bernard Brochand (1938–2025), a mayor of Cannes (2001–2014). Pierre Brochand is married with three children. He is a Chevalier of the Legion of Honour and Officer of the Order of Merit.
