= Domme, Dordogne =

Domme
- Commune
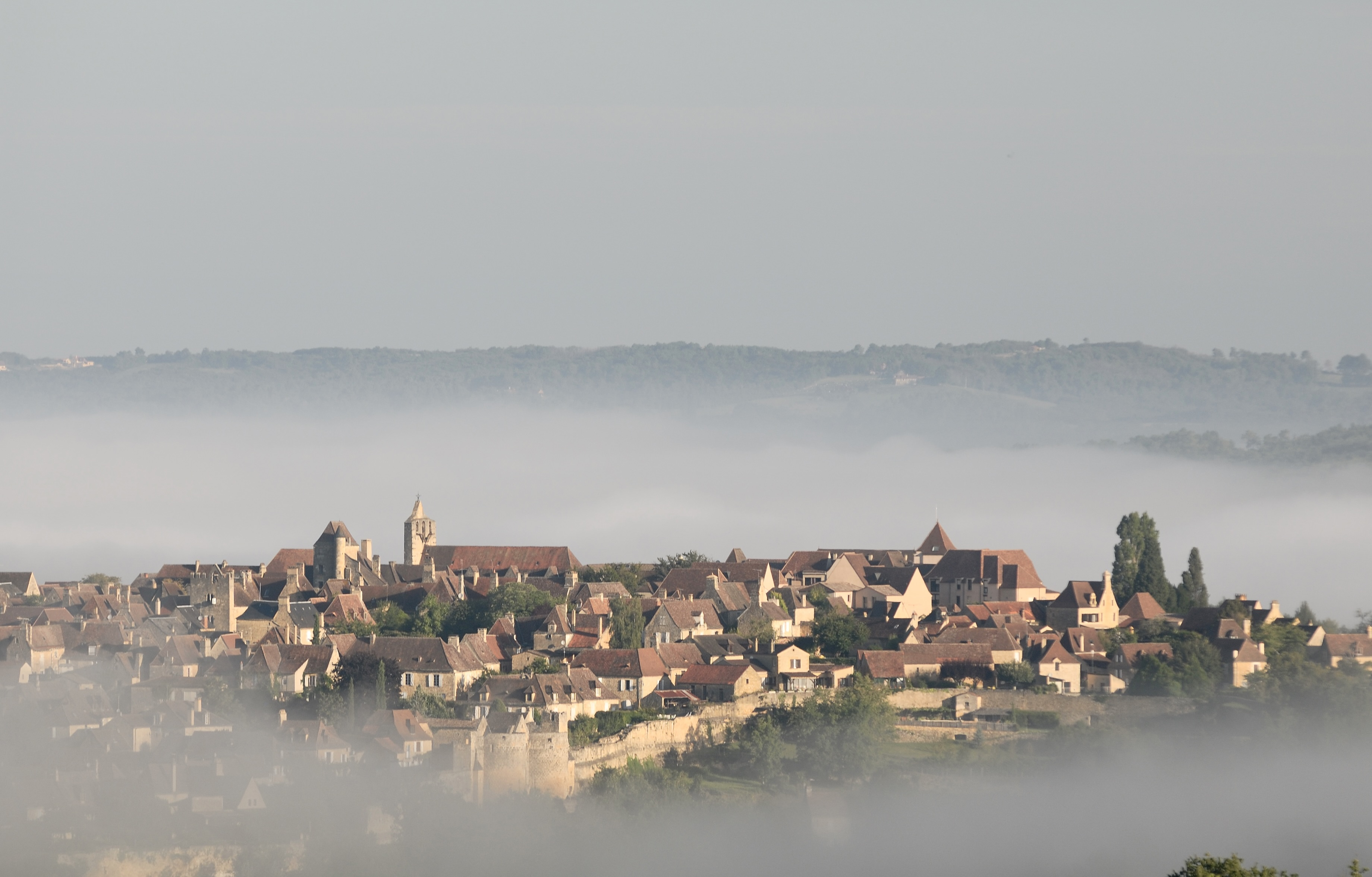
- A general view of Domme

- Coat of arms
- Location of Domme
- Location within France Location within Nouvelle-Aquitaine
- Coordinates: 44°48′08″N 1°12′52″E
- Country: France
- Region: Nouvelle-Aquitaine
- Department: Dordogne
- Arrondissement: Sarlat-la-Canéda
- Canton: Vallée Dordogne

Government
  - Mayor (2020–2026): Jean-Claude Cassagnole
- Area^{1}: 24.91 km^{2} (9.62 sq mi)
- Highest elevation: 303 m (994 ft)
- Lowest elevation: 60 m (200 ft)
- Population (2023): 906
  - Density: 36.4/km^{2} (94.2/sq mi)
- Time zone: UTC+01:00 (CET)
  - Summer (DST): UTC+02:00 (CEST)
- INSEE/Postal code: 24152 /24250
- ^{1} French Land Register data, which excludes lakes, ponds, glaciers > 1 km^{2} (0.386 sq mi or 247 acres) and river estuaries.

Domme (French pronunciation: [dɔm]; Occitan: Doma) is a commune in the department of Dordogne in Nouvelle-Aquitaine in southwestern France. It is sometimes called the "Acropolis of the Périgord".

== Geography ==
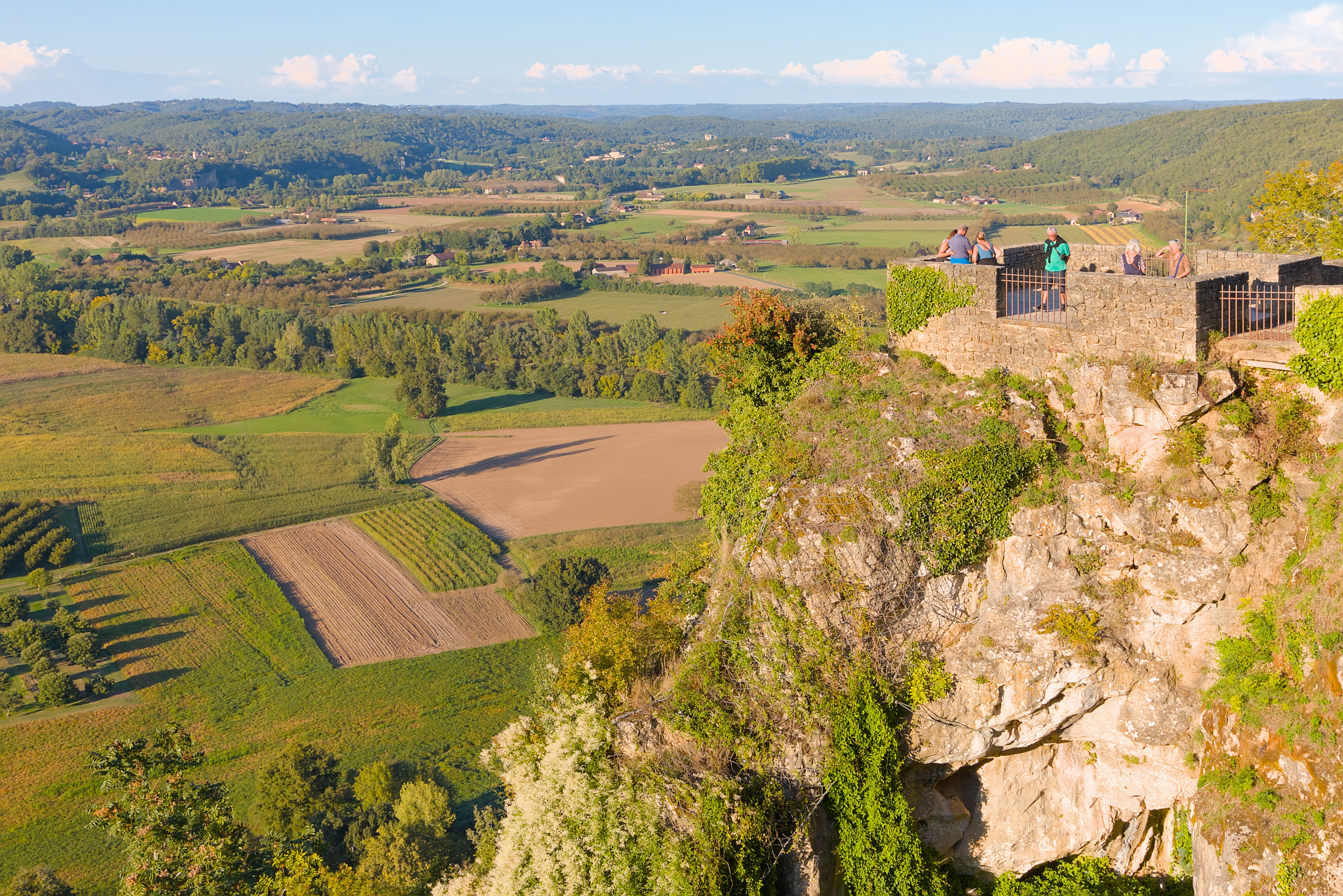
Domme's belvedere over the Dordogne valley

Domme is 250 metres (820 ft) above sea level on a rocky outcrop overlooking the Dordogne river. With its trapezoid city plan, Domme is a bastide (a fortified medieval town) adapted to the surrounding terrain, and thus falling short of the rectangular city plan characteristic to bastides.

Today a member of the association Les Plus Beaux Villages de France ("The Most Beautiful Villages of France"), Domme has two public spaces of medieval origin: the commercial Place de la Halle ("Market Hall Square") and the Place de La Rode, where the breaking wheel entertained the public. There were two other notable locations in the village: the fair and the moneyer's house.

== History ==
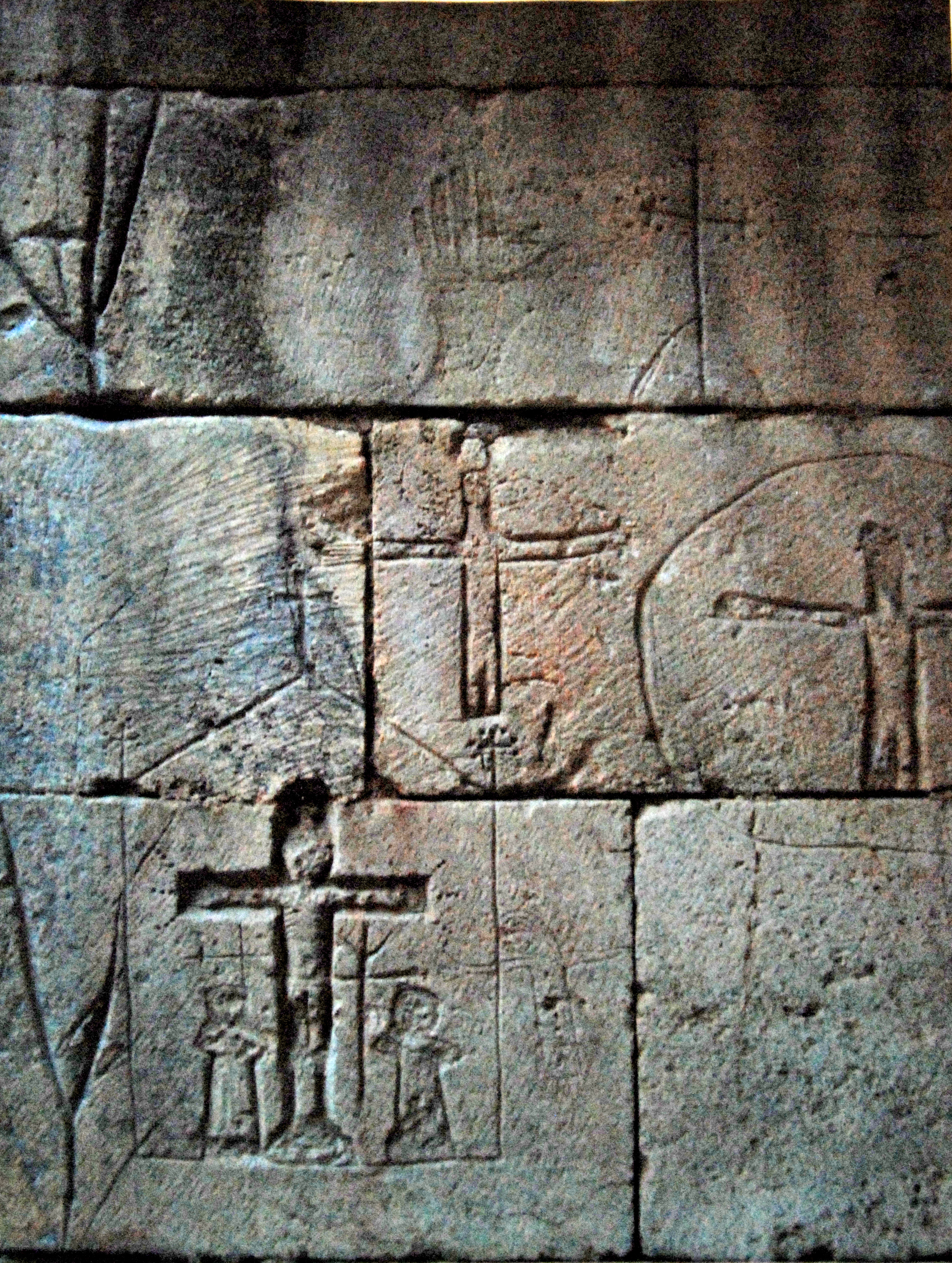
Templar graffiti on a prison wall

Founded as a stronghold in 1281 by Philip the Bold following his campaign along the Dordogne river, Domme was granted the right to mint its own currency.

In 1307, many Knights Templar were imprisoned in Domme during the trial against them, and hundreds of Templar graffiti still bear witness to this. They used a code based on a series of geometric figures: the octagon represented the Grail, the triangle surmounted by a cross represented Golgatha, the square represented the Temple, and the circle represented imprisonment. Similar inscriptions (of disputed authenticity) have been found in other towns such as Loches, Gisors, and Chinon.

During the Hundred Years' War, the English sought to control the bastide. They first took the town in 1347 and it repeatedly changed hands throughout the war until 1437, when it finally returned to French rule.

The Wars of Religion brought new disturbances to the town. Protestants briefly took the city in 1588 by climbing the cliffs at night to open the gates. However, the Protestant captain was besieged in the bastide and had to hand it back to the Catholics in 1592. The city then witnessed popular revolts (the Jacquerie des Croquants) in 1594 and 1637.

Domme prospered during the seventeenth century only to decline thereafter, which greatly facilitated its preservation in modern times.

== Population ==
Historical population
Year	Pop.	±% p.a.
1968	876	—
1975	891	+0.24%
1982	910	+0.30%
1990	1,030	+1.56%
1999	987	−0.47%
2007	1,019	+0.40%
2012	989	−0.60%
2017	911	−1.63%
2023	906	−0.09%
Source: INSEE

== Points of interest ==
Domme is famous for its fortifications, which were completed by 1310. The Porte des Tours with the main entrance loads to two drum-shaped towers of stone on the east and west part of the wall. The walls, first completed in 1310, contain two more gates.

The halle, first erected in the 17th century and rebuilt in 1954, faces towards the marketplace, the Place de la Halle. The Maison du Gouverneur, on the opposite side of the Place de la Halle, is a fortress-like building with tower and turrets, first built in the 15th century and expanded in the 17th.

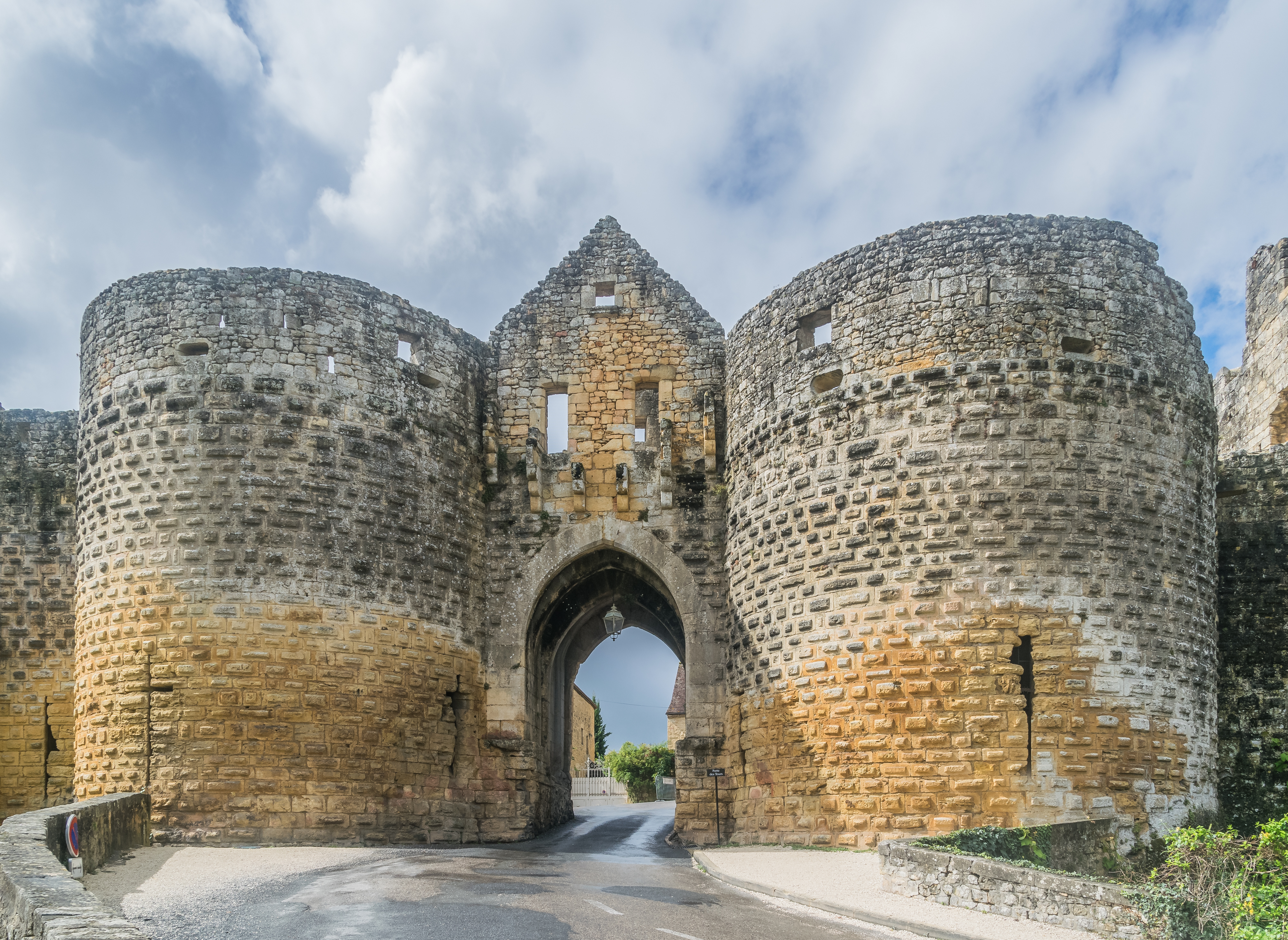
Porte des Tours (Towers Gate)

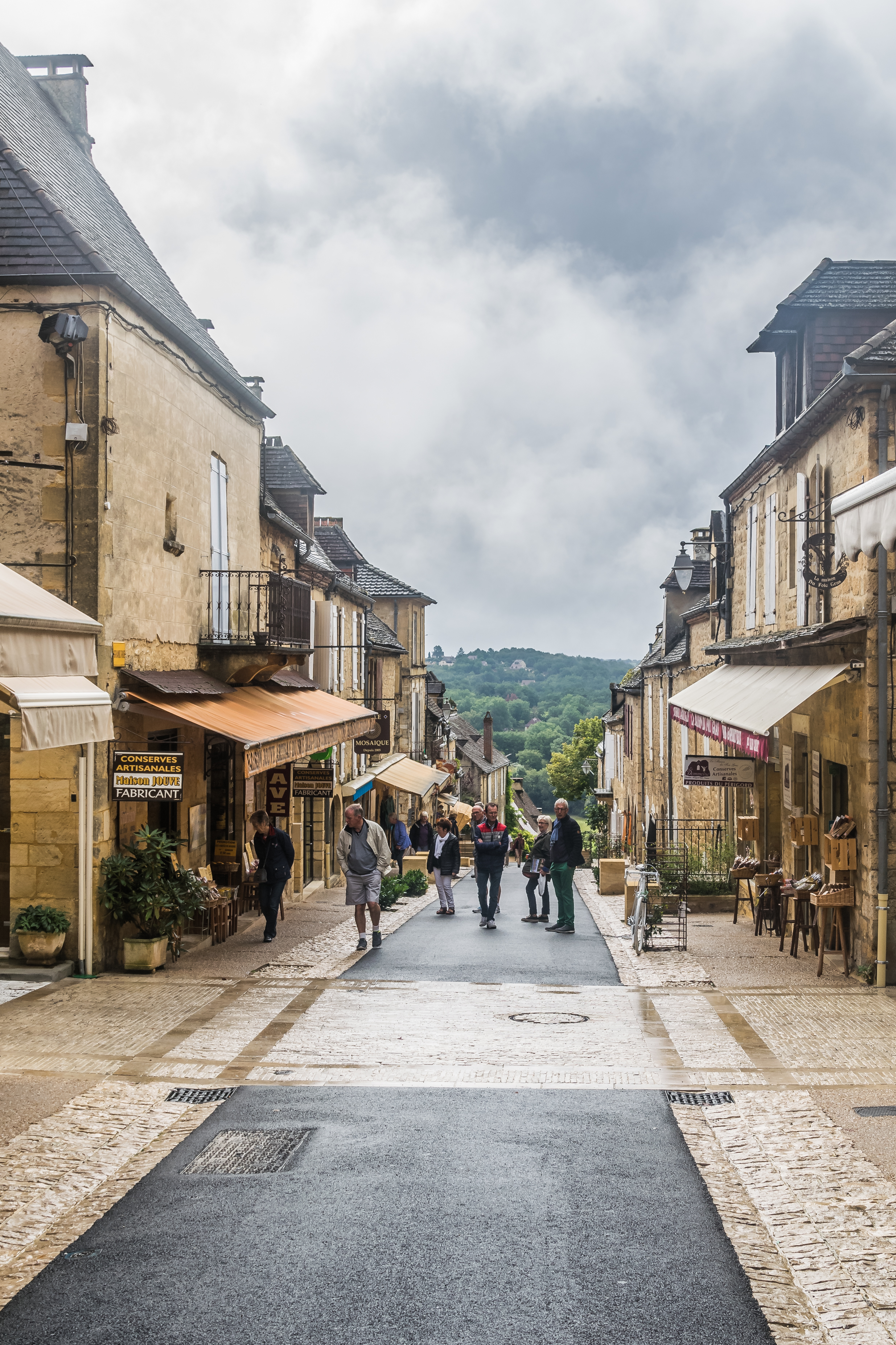
Main street

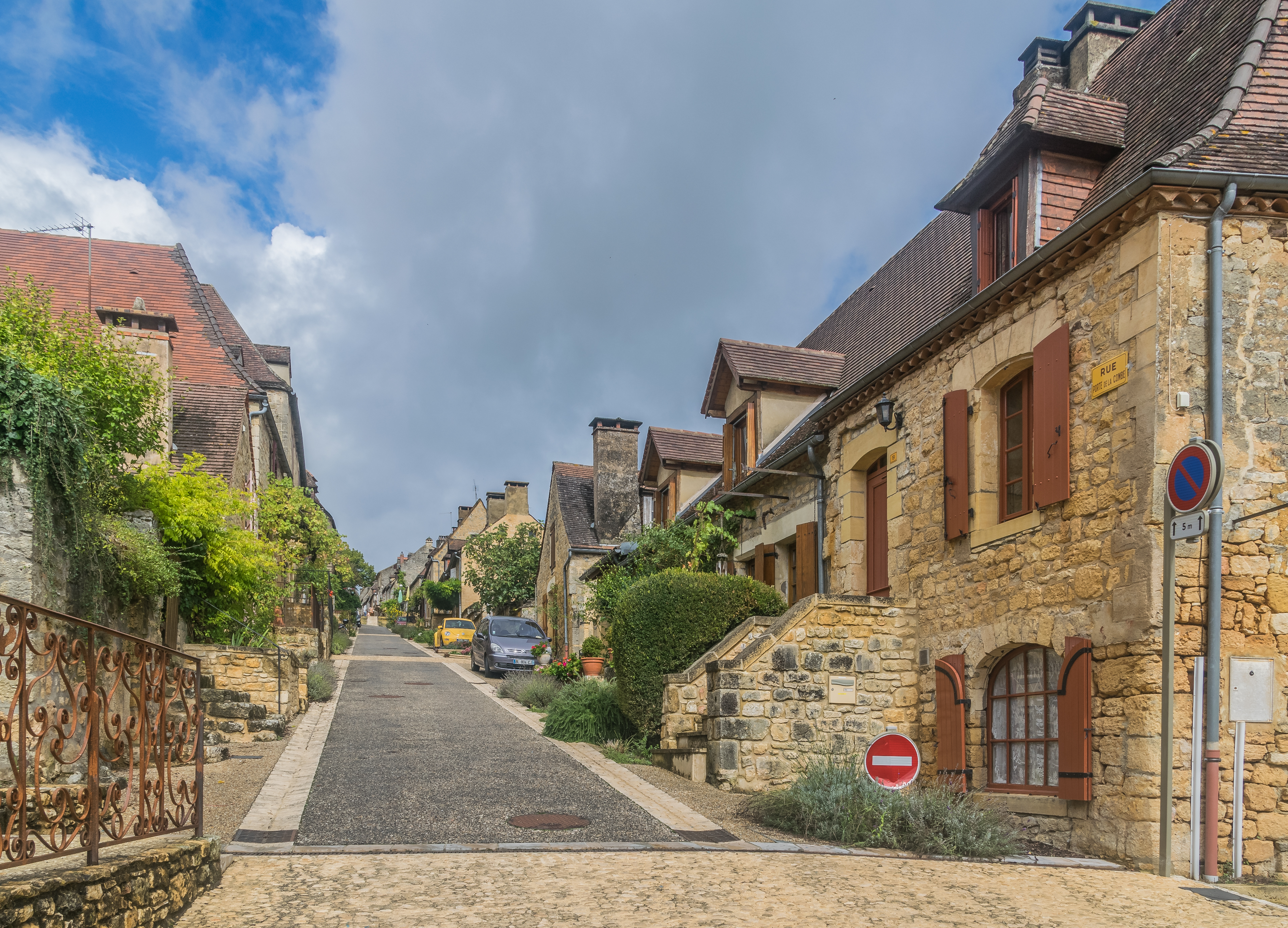
Porte de la Combe street

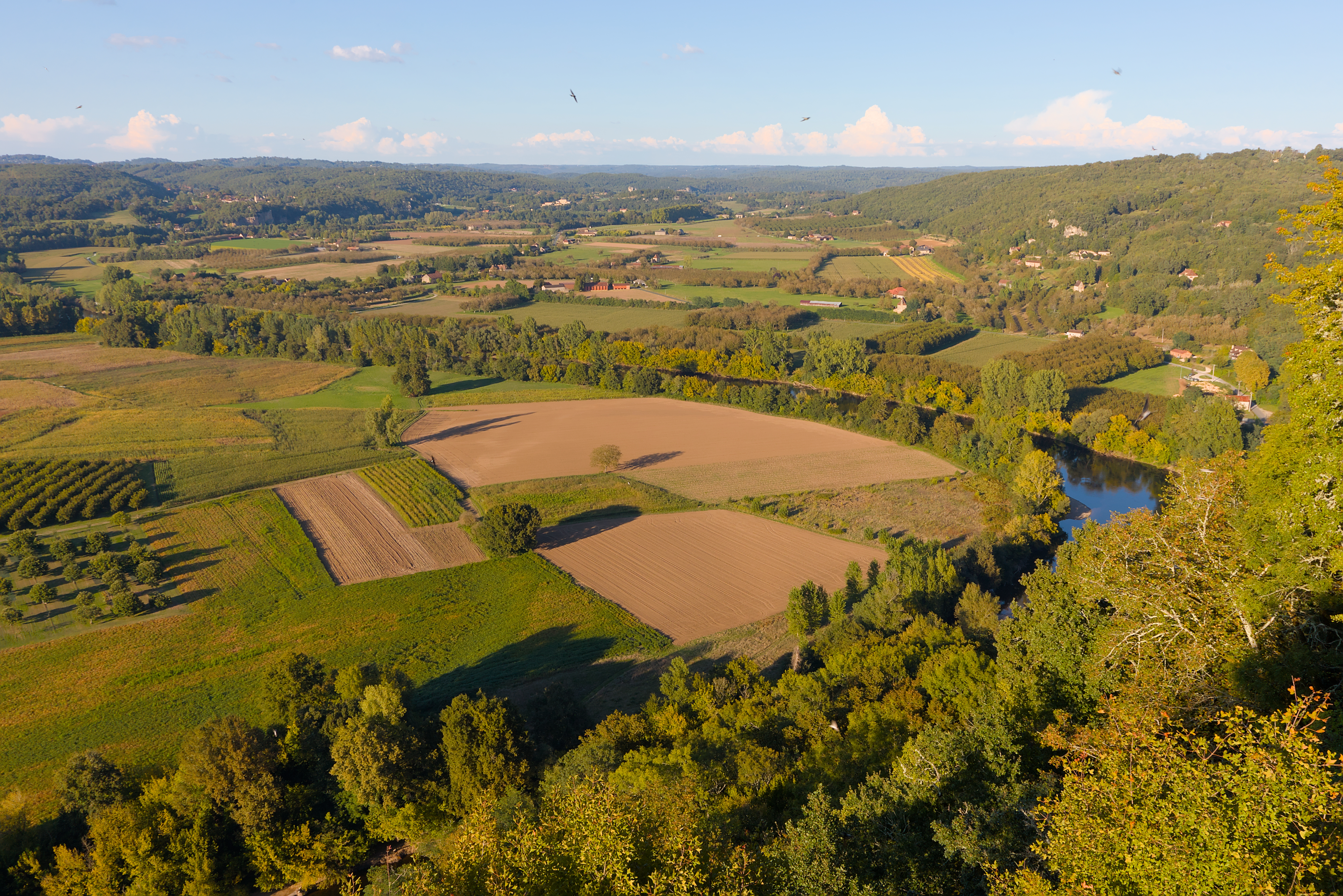
View from the belvedere

== In film ==
The village, including the church and the ramparts, served as a shooting location for Le Tatoué by Denys de La Patellière with Jean Gabin and Louis de Funès in 1968.

== Notable residents ==
- Christiaan Cornelissen, born in 1864 in Bois-le-Duc, the Netherlands, died in 1942 in Domme. He was a Dutch libertarian communist teacher, author and economist.

== See also ==
- Communes of the Dordogne department
