= René de Marmande =

French anarchist journalist (1875–1949)

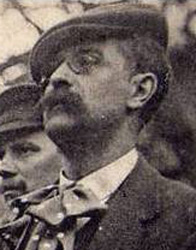
- René de Marmande at Méru in April 1909
- Born: Marie Constant Emmanuel de Rorthay de Saint Hilaire; 1 January 1875; Vannes, Morbihan, France
- Died: 22 October 1949 (aged 74); Chapelle-Forainvillers, Eure-et-Loir, France
- Occupation: Journalist
- Known for: Anarchist activism

Vicomte Gilbert de Rorthays (1 January 1875 – 22 October 1949), alias René de Marmande, was a French journalist and anarchist.

== Life ==
=== Origins ===
Marie Constant Emmanuel de Rorthay de Saint Hilaire—who later took the pseudonym of René de Marmande—was born in Vannes, Morbihan on 1 January 1875. His family were minor nobility of the Vendée, and his father was prefect of Morbihan.

=== Pre-war career ===
Marmande became a journalist, and played an active role in the libertarian and revolutionary syndicalist movements before World War I (1914–18). He contributed to the Temps Nouveaux of Jean Grave, the Guerre sociale of Gustave Hervé and the bulletin of the Association internationale antimilitariste (AIA: International Anti-Militarism Association). In 1906 he was appointed treasurer of Liberté d'opinion (Freedom of opinion), a committee to assist political prisoners. Other activists in the committee included Charles Desplanques, Alphonse Merrheim, Émile Janvion, Paul Delesalle and Auguste Garnery.

In August 1907 Marmande, Amédée Dunois, Benoît Broutchoux, Henri Beylie, and Pierre Monatte were among the French delegates to the International Anarchist Congress of Amsterdam, where Marmande was rapporteur for the discussion on "anti-militarism as a tactic of anarchism". Only eight French anarchists attended the Congress at all. Marmande signed a proposition that said syndicalism and the material interests of the proletariat were the main basis of revolutionary activity, and another that said revolutionary trade unionism and the general strike are only means and can in no way replace the Social Revolution. The capitalistic régime could only be abolished through an insurrection and expropriation, and the battle should be directed against all authoritarian forces. Marmande also attended the congress of the AIA while in Amsterdam. Marmande met Emma Goldman at the anarchist congress. In her notes she recorded:

R.De Marmande, revolutionaire and true bohéme, full of esprit, with a keen sense of humor. He refuses to see in the Mother of Freedom—Revolution—a black-robed nun, walking about in penitence and despair over the sins of mankind. Revolution, to him, is the great liberator, the joy-bearer.

In October 1907 Marmande co-founded an anarchist group that met in the office of the Temps Nouveaux, along with Jean Grave, Marc Pierrot, Charles Benoît and the Dutch Christiaan Cornelissen. In May 1908 he participated in the creation of the Fédération anarchiste, which represented the pro-syndicalist trend in opposition to that of Marceau Rimbault, but this group did not stay together. After the strikes of pit workers at Draveil were suppressed in July 1908, he helped create the Comité de Défense Sociale (CDS: Social Defense Committee) to support the accused. He also helped support the anarchist drivers Albert Jacquart and Maurice Girard, who were persecuted by the police and the courts.

In April 1909 Marmande was working for the newspaper La Guerre Sociale and was a member of the anarchist group of Paris-Ternes. That month he, Miguel Almereyda and Georges Durupt established the Fédération Révolutionnaire (Revolutionary Federation) in an effort to bring together the various anarchist groups. The founding congress was held in April 1909 in the premises of the Confédération générale du travail (CGT: General Confederation of Labor). Before the last session, Marmande and others left to speak at a meeting of striking button makers in Méru, Oise. The meeting was interrupted by a charge of the gendarmerie. In June 1909 his house in Paris was raided as part of an investigation into a wave of sabotage of telegraph and telephone lines.

Marmande was one of the organizers of a protest against the visit of Tsar Nicholas II to Paris in July 1909. In October 1909 he was involved in the protests over the execution of Francesc Ferrer i Guàrdia in Spain. He belonged to the Unparliamentary Revolutionary Committee from February to May 1910. In 1912 Marmande was one of the leaders of the campaign to release Emile Rousset, and was secretary of the committee for this purpose. (Note: Émile Rousset was a soldier who had reported the death of a fellow prisoner Albert Aernoult, apparently from brutal punishment, at a military camp in Algeria. Rousset was subsequently charged with other offenses and sentence to five years hard labor.) He was one of the signatories of the poster A bas Biribi, which denounced the Algerian military prisons and demanded justice for Rousset. The signatories were persecuted for incitement to murder and disobedience, but were acquitted at their trial of 4–5 July 1910. He went to Algeria for the CDS to investigate conditions, and brought back much of the evidence used in Rousset's defense, but his expense accounts were challenged and he resigned from the CDS.

=== World War I and later ===
Marmande was entered on the Carnet B police list of anti-military activists. During World War I (1914–18) he was mobilized in March 1916 to the 13th artillery regiment, but was discharged due to myopia. He returned to activism in May 1917, and founded the pacifist weekly review Les Nations. The review was on the left wing of the union sacrée. In April 1918 he was called as a witness at the trial of Almereyda's Bonnet rouge journal. After the war he joined the Clamart section of the French Communist Party for a short period. He then became a member of the Ligue des Droits de l'Homme (League of Human Rights).

Marmande contributed to various journalist of the reformist trend in the CGT, including L'Atelier and Le Peuple et Syndicats of René Belin. During World War II (1939–45), under the German occupation he contributed to L'Atelier, where he published his memoirs. He had become hostile to communism, and wrote for the collaborationist press. He died on 22 October 1949 at Chapelle-Forainvillers, Eure-et-Loir.

== Sources ==
- Cerullo, John (Summer 2008). "The Aernoult-Rousset Affair: Military Justice on Trial in Belle Époque France". Historical Reflections / Réflexions Historiques. 34 (2, Beyond Left and Right: New Perspectives on the Politics of the Third Republic). Berghahn Books: 4–24. JSTOR 23232708.
- Goldman, Emma; Falk, Candace; Pateman, Barry; Moran, Jessica M. (2005). Emma Goldman: Making speech free, 1902-1909. University of California Press. ISBN 978-0-520-22569-5.
- Maitron, Jean (1975). Le mouvement anarchiste en France (in French). Vol. 1. François Maspero.
- "MARMANDE, René de [vicomte de RORTHAYS de SAINT HILAIRE, Marie, Constant, Emmanuel, Gilbert dit]", Dictionnaire des militants anarchistes (in French), 15 July 2013
- "René de Marmande", Ephéméride Anarchiste 22 octobre (in French)
- Robert, Vincent; Verger, Eduard J. (Autumn 1992). ""La protesta universal" contra la ejecución de Ferrer: las manifestaciones de octubre de 1909". Historia Social (in Spanish) (14). Fundacion Instituto de Historia Social: 61–82. JSTOR 40340311.
