= Émile Janvion =

French anarcho-syndicalist (1866–1927)

- Born: 10 April 1866; Mâcon, Saône-et-Loire, France
- Died: 21 July 1927 (aged 61); Paris, France
- Occupation: Teacher
- Known for: Anarcho-syndicalism; Proto-fascism

Émile Janvion (10 April 1866 – 21 July 1927) was a French teacher, an anarcho-syndicalist leader, a founder of the Confédération générale du travail (CGT) and a leader of the anti-militarist movement. He came to hold national syndicalist views, which will later into a form of fascism. He was antisemitic, anti-masonic, anti-republican and sympathetic towards monarchism. He also had an agenda that included nationalization of the land and of the means of production.

== Life ==
=== Early years ===
Émile Janvion was born on 10 April 1866 in Mâcon, Saône-et-Loire. He was given the nickname "Pisse-vinaigre" (vinegar piss). In 1893 he founded the first syndicate of employees of the prefecture. Janvion was one of the founders of the Confédération Générale du Travail, (CGT – General Confederation of Labor). In 1896 he contributed towards the Parisian anarchist newspaper Le Père Duchêne.

In 1897 Janvion and Jean Degalvès founded the Ligue d'enseignement libertaire (League of Libertarian Education). The league was in favor of rational and complete education with mixed classes. That year Janvion and Degalvès published the brochure La liberté par l'enseignement (Freedom through Education). Although helped by major figures such as Jean Grave, Émile Zola, Maurice Barrès and Octave Mirbeau, they could only raise enough money to teach a small group of 19 children in the 1898 and 1899 summer holidays in Pontorson, Lower Normandy, and to conduct some lectures and evening courses at the Hôtel des Sociétés Savantes between 1899 and 1900. The school closed in 1901 due to lack of money and disagreements between Janvion and Degalvès.

Janvion wrote for various anarchist papers between 1898 and 1899 including La Aurore, Le Libertaire, Le Cri de Révolte, L'Homme Libre and Le Journal du Peuple. He wrote for the periodical Germinal from 1899 to 1902. This was an anarchist journal published in Paterson, New Jersey, US. From 1899 Janvion led an antisemitic and anti-masonic campaign among syndicalists. He was the main organizer of the Anti-Parliamentary Congress of 1900, which was banned before it could be held.

=== Anti-militarist ===
In December 1902 Émile Janvion was one of the founders of the Ligue antimilitariste, along with fellow anarchists Henri Beylie, Paraf-Javal, Albert Libertad and Georges Yvetot. The Ligue antimilitariste was to become the French section of the Association internationale antimilitariste (AIA). In preparation for the anti-militarist congress in Amsterdam in 1904 Janvion launched L'Ennemi du peuple (The Enemy of the People (Note: The title L'Ennemi du peuple is a reference to Henrik Ibsen's play An Enemy of the People.)). The bi-monthly four-page journal first appeared in August 1903, with contributions from Miguel Almereyda, Zo d'Axa, Lucien Descaves, Élie Faure, Urbain Gohier, Charles Malato and Jehan Rictus. Georges Darien, who had suggested the title to Janvion, contributed from the second issue. Divergences of opinion soon appeared in the Ennemi's pages. Skirmishes developed into outright war between the contributors, and eventually Janvion decided to close the journal down. The last issue appeared in November 1904.

In October 1906 Janvion was the delegate of the Union of Paris Municipal Employees to the 15th national congress of the CGT in Amiens. In 1907 government troops fired on winemakers in Languedoc who were protesting imports of cheap Algerian wine, killing several. Janvion was among the anti-militarist revolutionary syndicalists who were indicted for signing a poster protesting the massacres, blaming a "government of murderers". He was dismissed from his job as a municipal official in the prefecture of the Seine for having signed the poster, but after an amnesty regained his position with all rights. On 1 May 1908 Janvier spoke at the Bourse du travail, and denounced the oppressive tactics of Georges Clemenceau whom he accused of fomenting the disiturbances of 1 May 1906 so that he could claim to be the only man capable of preventing revolution. In October 1908 he again represented his union at the 16th national congress in Marseille.

=== Antisemite ===
In the spring and summer of 1908 Janvion attacked Freemasons and the republic in a violent campaign among the syndicalists. Janvion denounced Freemasonry, which he called a "Mardi Gras brotherhood" serving "the masters of the hour." He spoke out against the growing subordination of the unions to what he called the Radical-masonic-Jewish establishment. From 1909 his journal Terre libre provided a platform for antisemites and anti-republican syndicalists. In April 1911 Janvion and Émile Pataud sponsored a mass meeting in Paris that they called "a great anti-Jewish and anti-Masonic demonstration. Janvion was expelled from the CGT in 1913 for his antisemitism.

=== Anti-republican ===
In 1908 Georges Valois started an "inquiry into the monarchy and the working class" in the first issue of the Revue critique des idées et des livres. He invited various syndicalists and intellectuals interested in syndicalism to comment on whether the monarchy would be preferable to the republic in advancing working class interests and the progress of syndicalism. Janvion was among the thirteen whose replies were published, of whom only the royalist syndicalist Darguenat was in favor of the monarchy. Valois gave Janvion's response a flattering introduction, but although Janvion was glad to criticize the republic he would not support the idea of a monarchy, which he thought would not be viable without politicians.

In November 1909 the revolutionary syndicalist Marius Riquier helped Janvion and the writer Georges Darien to found the anti-republican journal Terre Libre (Free Land). Janvion decided to cooperate with royalists, and in return received support for the Terre Libre. He worked with Léon Daudet and Mahon, leader of the Amicale royaliste, to arrange workers' meetings. As part of the drive to gain support for royalism among syndicalists, Janvier and three other syndicalists hung a bust of Marianne (symbol of the republic) from the front of the Bourse de Travail in Paris. They were prosecuted for this act.

It was said that Georges Valois was providing money for the Terre Libre from Action Française. Valois probably used Marius Riquier, who worked for both the Action Française and the Terre Libre, to make contact with the syndicalist movement through Janvion. Left-wing members of the Action Français who followed Charles Maurras collaborated in Terre Libre with revolutionary syndicalists. The journal appeared until May 1914, and constantly insisted that exploitation of workers could only be achieved by nationalizing the land. Janvion's Terre libre group evolved towards fascism. To Janvion, as to fellow-socialists Georges Sorel and Édouard Berth, democracy was the supreme evil in all circumstances.

=== Anti-feminist ===
During World War I (1914–1918) Janvion published an undated pamphlet, probably in late 1917, titled Le féminisme défaitiste (Defeatist Feminism). He identified pro-peace feminist leaders such as Hélène Brion, Séverine, Marguerite Durand, Hubertine Auclert and Nelly Roussel, and wrote, "the history of defeatism, when it is known, will demonstrate superabundantly that feminism will there merit, I dare say, the place of honor." Émile Janvion died on 21 July 1927 in Paris and was buried the next day in the cemetery of Bagneux, Ile de France.

== Publications ==
Publications included:

- Janvion, Émile (1897). Le Dogme et la science. au journal "le Libertaire. p. 60.
- Janvion, Émile (1902). L'école, antichambre de caserne et de sacristie. Publications de la Colonie Communiste d'Aiglemont. p. 31.
- Janvion, Émile (1907). Du syndicat de fonctionnaires.
- Janvion, Émile (1912). La Franc-Maçonnerie et la Classe Ouvrière: conférence donnée le 3 Avril 1910, à l'Hôtel des Sociétés Savantes. p. 32.

== Sources ==
- "Anarcoefemèrides del 22 de juliol". Anarcoefemèrides (in Catalan). Archived from the original on 2016-03-03.
- Bécat, Pierre (1971). L' anarchiste Proudhon. Nouvelles Editions Latines. GGKEY:BYWLH5YF860.
- Benoist, Alain de (2007-08-01). Cahiers du cercle Proudhon. Avatar Editions. ISBN 978-0-9555132-0-6.
- Bosc, David (1996). Georges Darien. Editions Sulliver. ISBN 978-2-911199-12-7.
- Douglas, Allen (1992). From Fascism to Libertarian Communism: Georges Valois Against the Third Republic. University of California Press. ISBN 978-0-520-91209-0.
- Gildea, Robert (1996-01-01). The Past in French History. Yale University Press. ISBN 978-0-300-06711-8.
- Grayzel, Susan R. (1999). Women's Identities at War: Gender, Motherhood, and Politics in Britain and France During the First World War. UNC Press Books. ISBN 978-0-8078-4810-4.
- "Janvion Émile [Philippe, dit]". Dictionnaire des anarchistes. Maitron/Editions de l'Atelier.
- Michel, Louise; Gauthier, Xavière (2000-01-01). Histoire de ma vie: seconde et troisième parties : Londres 1904. Presses Universitaires Lyon. ISBN 978-2-7297-0648-7.
- Miller, Paul B. (2002-03-14). From Revolutionaries to Citizens: Antimilitarism in France, 1870–1914. Duke University Press. ISBN 0-8223-8058-7.
- Moreau, Jean (2010). "Il y a un complot maçonnique". Le Grand Livre des idées reçues - INSOLITE et GRANDES ÉNIGMES. Partenaire WidgetAvenue. ISBN 978-2-84670-323-9.
- Sternhell, Zeev (1995). The Birth of Fascist Ideology: From Cultural Rebellion to Political Revolution. Princeton University Press. p. 109. ISBN 0-691-04486-4.
- Sternhell, Zeev (1996). Neither Right Nor Left: Fascist Ideology in France. Princeton University Press. ISBN 0-691-00629-6.
- Weber, Eugen (1962). Action Française: Royalism and Reaction in Twentieth Century France. Stanford University Press.
- Wistrich, Robert S. (2012-06-01). From Ambivalence to Betrayal: The Left, the Jews, and Israel. U of Nebraska Press. ISBN 978-0-8032-4083-4.
