= Charles Desplanques =

French anarchist (1877–1951)

Charles Aristide Desplanques
- Born: 6 February 1877; Ivry-sur-Seine, France
- Died: 17 July 1951 (aged 74); Paris, France
- Occupations: Anarchist, journalist

Charles Aristide Desplanques (6 February 1877 – 17 July 1951) was a militant anarchist, syndicalist and anti-militarist who wrote regularly for numerous anarchist journals in France and Belgium.

== Life ==
Charles Aristide Desplanques was born on 6 February 1877 in Ivry-sur-Seine, a suburb of Paris. He was a barber by profession. He was arrested in 1903 for a sortie against a placement office. He became a member of the Confédération générale du travail (CGT: General Confederation of Labor) and in 1908 became its Assistant Secretary. He was one of the contributors to the Temps Nouveaux (New Times) of Jean Grave, for which he reported on developments in revolutionary syndicalism.

In 1906 Desplanques was imprisoned for a year for signing a poster of the Association internationale antimilitariste (AIA: International Anti-militarist Association). The affiche rouge, as it came to be called, was plastered all over Paris on the night of 6–7 October 1905 on the eve of the annual arrival of military conscripts at the caserne. It appealed to the conscripts to give their allegiance to the working class rather than the bourgeoisie. It then went on to say: "when you are commanded to fire your guns at your destitute brothers [during a strike]—like what happened at Chalon, Martinique and Limoges—workers, soldiers of tomorrow, you will not hesitate; you will obey. You will shoot, but not at your Comrades. You will fire on the decorated ruffian who dares give you such orders..." It is possible that Desplanques had not in fact signed the poster, but that Miguel Almereyda and Georges Yvetot had written in his name for him.

After his release Desplanques was placed in charge of the CGT newspaper La Voix du Peuple in place of Pouget, who had been imprisoned. He was then, with Georges Yvetot, secretary of the Fédération des Bourses de travail (Federation of Labor Exchanges). He was drafted as a medical aid during World War I (1914–18). He moved away from unionism, but continued to contribute to the anarchist press, notably for the review Plus Loin of Dr Pierrot. By 1929 Desplanques was a middle-aged professional advocate of worker's rights. In the Gallia in 1929 he discussed the problem of lunch breaks for coiffeurs. He was against the repas collectif where all employees took lunch at the same time, and in favor of each salon working out its own system of breaks.

Charles Desplanques died on 17 July 1951 in Paris at the age of 74.

== Works ==
- Desplanques, Charles (1902). La mutualité dans l'assurance agricole. A. Fontemoing.
- Desplanques, Charles (1927). Barbiers, Perruquiers, Coiffeurs, par Charles Desplanques, ouvrier coiffeur. Avec figures dans le texte. Impr. Saint-Denis. p. 294.

== Sources ==
- "Ephéméride Anarchiste 17 juillet", L'Ephéméride Anarchiste (in French)
- Miller, Paul B. (2002-04-04). From Revolutionaries to Citizens: Antimilitarism in France, 1870–1914. Duke University Press. ISBN 0-8223-2766-X.
- Zdatny, Steven (2006-05-14). Fashion, Work, and Politics in Modern France. Palgrave Macmillan. ISBN 978-1-4039-8445-6.
