= Almereyda =

Almereyda is a surname. Notable people with the surname include:

- Michael Almereyda (born 1959), American film director, screenwriter, and film producer
- Miguel Almereyda (1883–1917), French journalist and activist against militarism
