= Jean-Jacques Liabeuf =

French anarchist, cop killer, guillotined in 1910

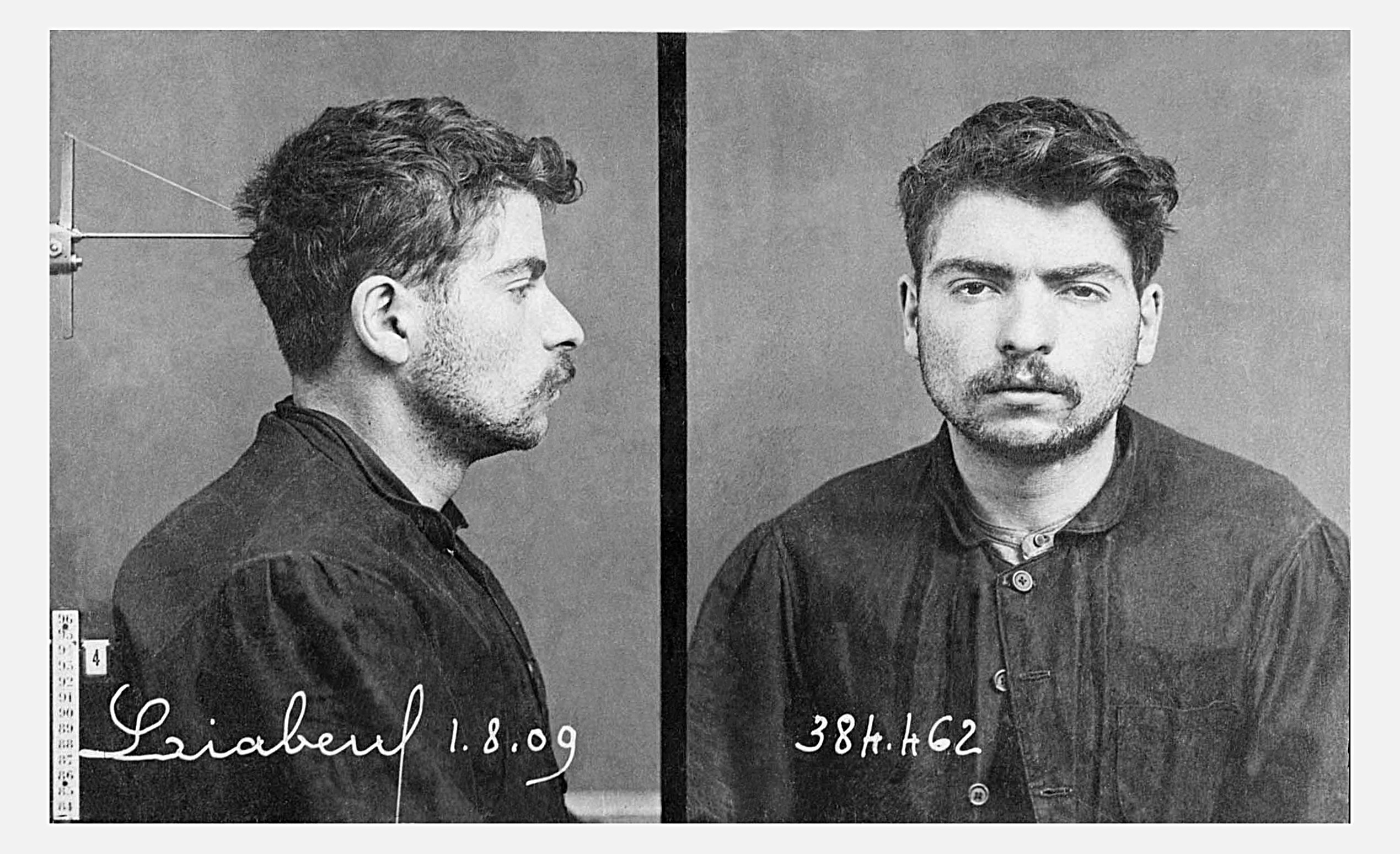
- French police photo of Liabeuf
- Born: January 11, 1886; Saint-Étienne, Loire department, France
- Died: July 1, 1910 (aged 24); Paris, France
- Cause of death: Execution by guillotine
- Occupation: Shoemaker
- Known for: Unjustly convicted, he took revenge by killing and wounding policemen
- Movement: Anarchism

Jean-Jacques Liabeuf, born on 11 January 1886 in Saint-Étienne and guillotined on 1 July 1910 in the 14th arrondissement of Paris, was a French anarchist.

A shoemaker sentenced for pimping, he took revenge by killing an officer of the vice squad and injuring others. A "liabouviste fever" swept through the French capital, with anarchists and sectors of the socialist movement regarding his death sentence as a political crime.

== Biographie ==
Jean-Jacques Liabeuf was born in Saint-Étienne to André Louis Liabeuf and Marie Vignal. His father died when he was four years old and his mother had to bring him up alone, together with his brother. At the age of fourteen, he was taken on as an apprentice in a gunsmith's shop, but only stayed there for six months before starting his training as a shoemaker. At the age of sixteen, when he had completed his apprenticeship, he left the family home to practise his skills as an itinerant shoemaker, travelling from village to village.

Nothing is known of the next four years, except that he returned to his home town and he committed a number of petty thefts that earned him two convictions: on 26 February 1907, he was imprisoned for four months, and on 7 June of the same year he was sentenced to three months and one day for stealing lead. Because of the repeat offence, the sentence was accompanied by a five-year ban on living in Saint-Étienne. On his release, he enlisted and was sent to the African battalions.

After completing his military service, he moved to Paris, where he worked as a shoemaker and met and fell in love with Alexandrine Pigeon, a prostitute under the control of the pimp Gaston, who was also a police informer. In the company of Pigeon, he was arrested on 31 July 1909 by two vice officers, Maugras and Vors, who suspected him of pimping. On 14 August, he was tried without the presence of his lawyer, who was having lunch in town and had excused himself by means of a pneumatic tube, and sentenced to three months' imprisonment, a 100-franc fine and a five-year residence ban for "special vagrancy" (procuring). When his sentence expired, he did not leave Paris, as he was required to do, and was arrested again by the police for failing to comply with this sanction, and sentenced to one month's imprisonment on 16 November 1909.

=== Release and new crime ===
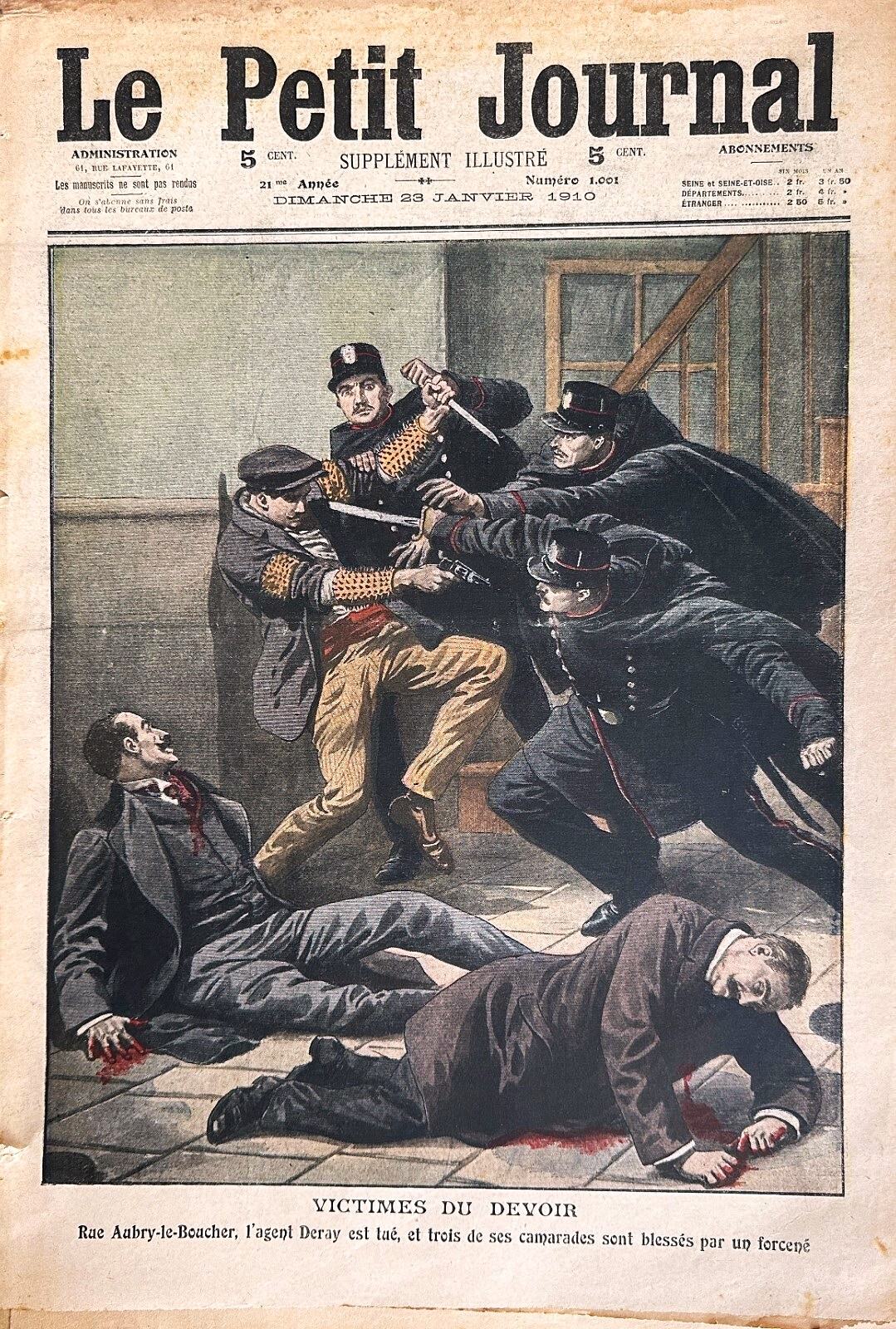
Arrest of Jean-Jacques Liabeuf on 8 January 1910.

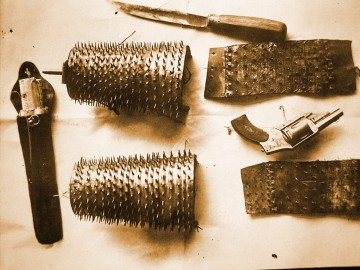
The revolver, the cobbler's knives and the spiked armbands.

On his release, feeling that he had been the victim of injustice, Liabeuf decided to take his revenge on the police officers.

On Saturday 8 January 1910, Liabeuf, wearing a strange suit of armour (arms and forearms covered with four leather armbands, bristling with a multitude of nails of his own making, weapons inspired by his readings of English short news items) masked by his cloak, set off on a pub crawl in the Les Halles quarter of Paris. He was also armed with a revolver and two shoemaker's knives. He was looking for police officers in the Saint-Merri quarter, not far from Les Halles. On 9 January, at around 8 am, as he was leaving a bar in rue Aubry-le-Boucher, he was apprehended by a police patrol for breaching the residence ban. He killed a policeman, Célestin Deray, with the knife and bullets from the revolver, and seriously wounded another officer in the throat. Four other policemen suffered superficial injuries. Liabeuf was struck with a sabre by agent Février. His transfer to the Hôtel-Dieu hospital was difficult, with people wanting to lynch him and others wanting to take advantage of the vice officers' injuries to beat them up.

While the press denounced this criminal act and argued that the fate of this ordinary apache should be decided by death, the insurrectionary and anti-militarist socialist Gustave Hervé broke ranks and caused a scandal by coming to Liabeuf's defence in the newspaper La Guerre Sociale. His article "L'exemple de l'apache" ("The example of the apache") sparked controversy in particular for the sentence "I find that in this century of weaklings and wimps [siècle d'aveulis et d'avachis] [Liabeuf] has given a fine lesson in energy and courage to the crowd of honest people; to us revolutionaries, he has given a fine example."

The left-wing press called for Liabeuf's pardon and Miguel Almereyda called on Parisians to use force to prevent Liabeuf's killing, warning that if they dared to use the guillotine, there would be more blood around it than under it. This simple news item hit the headlines in the Belle Époque and inflamed the working class. The Socialist Party supported the movement. A century later, in 2011, journalist Frédéric Lavignette dubbed the campaign the "Dreyfus affair of the workers."

=== Conviction and execution ===
This mobilisation of Liabeuf's supporters (the liabouvistes, as they were known) did not save him from being sentenced to death on 4 May. The request for a pardon from the President of the Republic, Armand Fallières, made by the left-wing press and many intellectuals, was rejected, and Liabeuf's execution provoked a huge demonstration. His execution took place on the night between 30 June and 1 July, in Boulevard Arago, at the foot of one of the walls of the Santé prison, in a climate of insurrection, with a 10,000-strong demonstration, clashes between 800 police officers and Liabeuf's defenders, and the army kept in reserve. Numerous rioters were injured, and many were arrested and brought to trial in the following days for rioting or attacking the police, while an anarchist killed a policeman in an attempt to kidnap Liabeuf, which provoked applause from the crowd and prompted prefect Lépine to order the Republican Guard to charge, sabre in hand. Right up until the executioner, Anatole Deibler, pulled the guillotine, the convict never stopped claiming that he had never been a pimp, but he never denied that he had killed a policeman and seriously injured another.
