= International Anarchist Congress of Amsterdam =

Political convention in 1907

- Date: 24–31 August 1907
- Locations: Amsterdam, Netherlands
- Participants: c. 80–100 delegates
- People: Errico Malatesta, Pierre Monatte, Luigi Fabbri, Benoît Broutchoux, Emma Goldman, Rudolf Rocker, Christiaan Cornelissen, Émile Chapelier, Domela Nieuwenhuis, Georges Thonar, Henri Fuss, Pierre Ramus, Max Baginski

The International Anarchist Congress of Amsterdam took place from 24 August to 31 August 1907. It gathered delegates from 14 countries, among which important figures of the anarchist movement, including Errico Malatesta, Luigi Fabbri, Benoît Broutchoux, Pierre Monatte, Amédée Dunois, Emma Goldman, Rudolf Rocker, Christiaan Cornelissen, et al.

== Organisation of the Congress ==
The Belgian and Dutch anarchists were at the initiative of the congress. While the Dutch took care of the material organisation of the event, the Belgians started the publication of the Bulletin of the Libertarian Internationale, which had as main editor Henri Fuss. In December 1906-January 1907, they launched a memo in seven languages calling for an international meeting, which was signed by the anarchist federations of the Netherlands, Belgium, Germany, Bohemia, London (anarchists speaking Yiddish)– it was not signed by any French anarchists. In France, the anarchist movement was divided into those who rejected the very idea of organization, and were therefore opposed to the very idea of an international organisation, and those who put all their hopes in the trade-unions, and thus "were occupied elsewhere". Only 8 French anarchists assisted the Congress, including Benoît Broutchoux, Pierre Monatte and René de Marmande.

== The 1907 Amsterdam Congress ==
Various themes were treated during the Congress, in particular concerning the organization of the anarchist movement and syndicalism. Other issues included popular education, the role of the general strike, and anti-militarism– an International Antimilitarist Congress simultaneously took place in Amsterdam. However, the most important debate concerned the relation between anarchism and syndicalism (or trade-unionism). In the end, a resolution was agreed upon, which stated that "the ideas of anarchy and organization, far from being incompatibles, as it has sometimes been pretended, complete themselves and enforce each another," and concluded on the necessary "creation of anarchist groups and on the federation of the already created groups."

An Anarchist International was thereafter constituted, composed of an international bureau of 5 members (Errico Malatesta, Rudolf Rocker, Alexander Schapiro, John Turner and Jean Wilquet), with the task of "creating international anarchist archives" and to "connect anarchists from different countries." The bureau was sited in London, and a new congress envisioned for 1909. The new International, to which the French anarchists remained hostile, only edited 12 issues of an irregular bulletin. At the end of 1911, the London bureau ceased all activities.

== The debate between Malatesta and Monatte ==
Malatesta and Monatte in particular disagreed on the issue of organization. Upholding the principles of the 1906 Charter of Amiens, which had proclaimed the ideological neutrality of trade-unions and their independence from political parties, Monatte thought that syndicalism, as understood in France, was revolutionary and would create the conditions of a social revolution. Monatte opposed this "French model" of neutrality of trade-unions to Russian anarchist trade-unions or to Belgian or German Christian or social-democrat trade-unions.

On the other hand, Malatesta criticized Monatte, stating that "syndicalism was not a necessary and sufficient means of social revolution," while at the same time supporting (as Monatte) the ideological neutrality of trade-unions, in order not to divide the workers' movement. Malatesta thought that trade-unions were reformist, and could even be, at times, conservative. Along with Cornélissen, he cited as example US trade-unions, where trade-unions composed of qualified workers sometimes worked in opposition to non-qualified workers in order to defend their relatively privileged position. According to Malatesta, anarchists had to also defend this Lumpenproletariat instead of only working for the improvement of labor conditions. Malatesta underlined divisions of interests inside the workers' movement itself, going so far as to criticize the notion of social class: "There is no class, at the strict sense of the word, as there are no class interests. Inside the workers' 'class' itself, there is, just as in the bourgeoisie, competition and struggle." Henceforth, he thought that workers' solidarity needed a common ideal, which could not be found in the frame of the professional trade-union. If Monatte had criticized the risk of a possible bureaucratization of the trade-unions, while asserting the necessity of maintaining permanent employees in trade-unions, Malatesta categorically denied the legitimacy for an anarchist to become such a permanent employee of a trade-union.

Finally, Malatesta criticized over-idealization of the general strike, stating that the latter could not, by itself, provoke a revolution, which would necessarily have to pass, according to him, by an armed insurrection.

== Legacy ==
According to some views, this opposition between two visions of the organization of the workers' movement in trade-unions was later on merged in anarcho-syndicalism, which combined the revolutionary conception of trade-unionism with anarchist principles. However, French syndicalists Monatte and Robert Louzon continued to argue for (revolutionary) syndicalist unions independent of any political party or grouping, while Malatesta continued arguing against the syndicalist or anarcho-syndicalist conception of revolutionary unions. To him unions needed to be open to all workers open to activity to defend their conditions, and anarchists should work inside those unions to influence the broadest layer of workers, without wanting to make the unions themselves anarchist.

== See also ==
- Bulletin international du mouvement syndicaliste
- International Anarchist Congresses
