= Foyot bombing =

1894 bombing in Paris

- Part of Ère des attentats
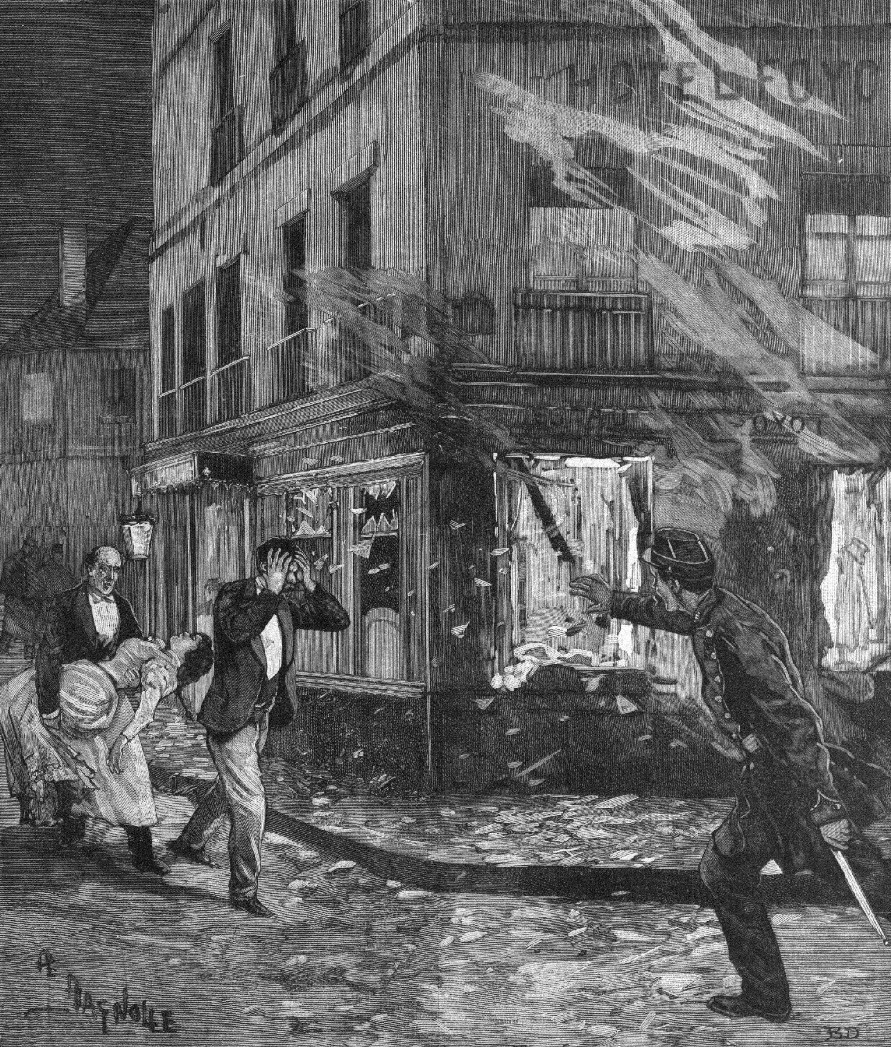
- Depiction of the Foyot bombing in Le Petit Parisien : supplément illustré (15 April 1894)
- Location: 48°50′58″N 2°20′16″E; Paris
- Date: 4 April 1894
- Attack type: bombing
- Deaths: 0
- Injuries: 4
- Perpetrator: Unknown

The Foyot bombing was a bomb attack carried out on 4 April 1894, in Paris against the Foyot restaurant, located at 33 rue de Tournon, fifty meters from the French Senate building. This attack, which took place during the Ère des attentats (1892–1894), injured four people, including the anarchists Laurent Tailhade and Julia Miahle, when a bomb hidden in a flower pot exploded. It followed the Madeleine bombing.

The identity of the perpetrator and the motive for this attack remain unknown, as the police at the time favored the idea of an anarchist attack possibly committed by Félix Fénéon, Louis Matha, or Paul Delesalle targeting a location associated with the French Senate, without real success. A crime of passion aimed at Tailhade was also suggested, although such a hypothesis seems very unlikely. According to Philippe Oriol, the most probable hypotheses are that it was either a police conspiracy by the French authorities against Tailhade aimed at legitimizing anti-anarchist repression or an attack launched by the Okhrana, the secret police of the Russian Empire, active in terrorism in Paris at that time and seeking to provoke unrest in France.

== History ==
=== Context ===
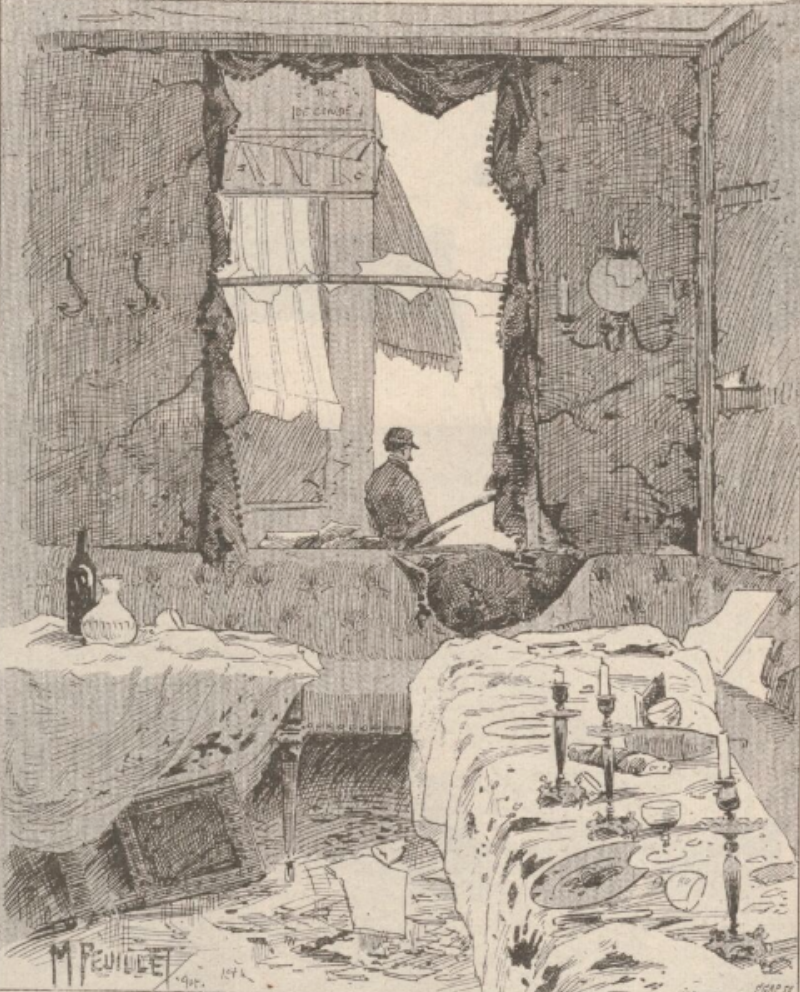
Aftermath of the Foyot bombing in Le Monde illustré (14 April 1894)

In the 19th century, anarchism emerged and took shape in Europe before spreading. Anarchists advocated a struggle against all forms of domination perceived as unjust including economic domination brought forth by capitalism. They were particularly opposed to the State, seen as the organization that legitimized these dominations through its police, army and propaganda.

The anarchists became increasingly radicalized in response to various events, particularly the Fourmies massacre, where the army fired on demonstrators, and the Clichy affair, where three anarchists were arrested, beaten with sabres, and deprived of water and medical care for some time before being subjected to a harsh trial. This radicalization led some of them to adopt a confrontational stance with the State through a campaign of terrorist attacks. Following the Saint-Germain bombing and the Clichy bombing (March 1892), their main perpetrator, Ravachol, was executed by the authorities. This situation further radicalized the anarchist militant Émile Henry, who subsequently carried out a series of bombings, including the Carmaux-Bons Enfants bombing (November 1892). In December 1893, Auguste Vaillant carried out the National Assembly bombing, targeting the center of French political power. Following this attack, several journalists visited Laurent Tailhade and Pierre Martinet, two anarchist activists who were having dinner together. Both supported the attack, which aimed at unpopular deputies and resulted in no fatalities.

Furthermore, the Foyot restaurant, located at 33 rue de Tournon, fifty meters from the French Senate, was an establishment founded by a former chef of king Louis-Philippe I, Nicolas Foyot.

=== Bombing ===
On 4 April 1894, while Tailhade was having dinner with his partner, Julia Miahle, someone placed a bomb on the windowsill near them, which faced the rue de Condé. The bomb was hidden in a flower pot and exploded shortly after 8:50 PM in the restaurant, injuring several people, including Tailhade, who was seriously wounded. The attack was not claimed.

=== Aftermath ===
Tailhade lost an eye in the bombing and needed weeks of recovery. The attack prompted mockery from L'Écho de Paris, which considered it an anarchist attack and thus an amusing situation where an anarchist was targeted by an anarchist attack.

== Analysis ==
=== Hypotheses ===
It remains very difficult to accurately assess what happened during this attack: the police and French authorities claimed it was an anarchist attack and officially suspected at least Félix Fénéon, Louis Matha, or Paul Delesalle of having committed it. Despite this, no charges or evidence seemed to substantiate their involvement significantly; the only potentially suspicious element was that Delesalle left Paris shortly after the attack, stating that he did so to avoid media attention. Furthermore, the fact that the attack occurred on the evening of a day when the Senate was not in session, and therefore no senators would be going to the restaurant, cast doubt on the hypothesis of an anarchist attack, according to historian Philippe Oriol.

Other hypotheses of the time, especially in the press, suggested that it might rather be a crime of passion from a former relationship of Tailhade, but Oriol finds this very unlikely and considers it a rumor spread by Gabriel Randon.

In reality, according to Tailhade, whose hypothesis does not seem implausible to the historian, it could be a police attack. The fact that the bomb did not actually target the senators, that it was made in such a way as not to be as lethal as it could have been—only injuring its victims—and that the police did not actively seek the perpetrators of the attack would indicate that it was a police attack intended to legitimize the upcoming vote on the third loi scélérate, which was then being drafted.

A second conceivable hypothesis is noted by Oriol, who points out that Pyotr Rachkovsky, head of the Okhrana in Paris, the secret police of the Russian Empire, seemed to want to undertake terrorist actions in France during the period of the Ère des attentats (1892–1894). The Foyot bombing could then possibly be an Okhrana attack aimed at increasing political unrest in France during this period.

== Bibliography ==
- Jourdain, Edouard (2013). L'anarchisme [Anarchism]. Paris: La Découverte. ISBN 978-2-7071-9091-8.
- Merriman, John M. (2016). The dynamite club: how a bombing in fin-de-siècle Paris ignited the age of modern terror. Yale University Press. ISBN 978-0-300-21792-6.
- Oriol, Philippe (1993). À propos de l'attentat Foyot [à Paris] : quelques questions et quelques tentatives de réponse [About the Foyot bombing [in Paris]: some questions and some attempts at answers] (in French). Paris: Au Fourneau. ISBN 978-2-86288-400-4.
- Ward, Colin (2004). Anarchism: A Very Short Introduction. Oxford University Press (OUP).
