= Amédée Dunois =

French socialist and journalist (1878–1945)

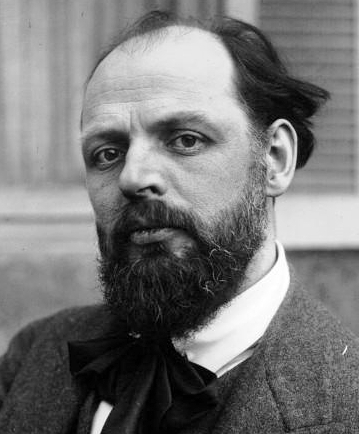
- Amédée Dunois in 1921
- Born: Amédée Catonné; 16 December 1878; Moulins-Engilbert, Nièvre, France
- Died: March 1945 (aged 66); Bergen-Belsen, Germany
- Occupations: Lawyer, journalist
- Known for: Activism

Amédée Dunois (French pronunciation: [amede dynwa]; 16 December 1878 – March 1945) was a French lawyer, journalist and politician.

== Life ==
Amédée Catonné was born in Moulins-Engilbert, Nièvre on 16 December 1878. He came from a respectable family. He was a brilliant student, already displaying literary gifts and cultural tastes that would distinguish him as a humanist. He earned a doctorate in law in 1899. He adopted the name Amédée Dunois, and worked as a journalist for Les Temps Nouveaux (1906–07) and La Bataille syndicaliste (1908–12). From 24–31 August 1907 he attended the International Anarchist Congress of Amsterdam with Pierre Monatte, Benoît Broutchoux, René de Marmande, Henri Beylie and others. In 1908 he joined the Anarchist Federation of the Seine and Seine-et-Oise.

Amédée Dunois worked with Jean Jaurès as political editor of L'Humanité from 1911, and became general secretary of the journal in 1918.

During World War I (1914–18) he was an active member of the minority movement which did not accept the union sacrée. After the war ended he continued this fight. He joined the Communist party and became a member of the directing committee. The National Bloc government imprisoned him in 1921. He continued his work with great energy, writing many articles on political news, history and doctrine, and press reviews.

During World War II (1939–45), from September 1940 Amédée Dunois organized the underground activity of the SFIO in the occupied zone of France. He edited the clandestine journal le Populaire, and wrote most of the articles. In 1943 he had the opportunity to leave for Algiers, but decided to return to Paris. He was raided several times by the Gestapo. On 8 October 1943 he was arrested and held in Fresnes Prison for a month. He was arrested again on 17 January 1944, and on 4 June 1944 was deported to the Oranienburg camp. He was moved to Belsen in February 1945.

Amédée Dunois died in Bergen-Belsen in Germany in March 1945. He was decorated with the Legion of Honour posthumously. The Collėge Amédée Dunois in Boissy-Saint-Léger is named after him.

== Works ==
Publications included:

- Amédée Dunois. A bas la guerre !!!. Reconstruction of the assassination of Jaurès. Paris.
- Amédée Dunois (1914). L'Action socialiste au Parlement : 1910-1914. Paris: Librairie du Parti socialiste.
- Amédée Dunois (29 October 1936). De la concentration capitaliste aux nationalisations. Paris: F. Béroud; Libraire populaire. p. 95.
- Amédée Dunois (11 January 1939). La Guerre de 1870-1871 et la Commune. Histoire nationale des Français, publiée sous la direction de M. Adrien-P. Bagarry. Paris: Levallois-Perret, Impr. Société industrielle d'imprimerie. p. 440.

== Sources ==
- Amédée Dunois (1878-1945): pseudonyme individuel, BnF: Bibliothéque Nationale de France
- "Amédée Dunois". text of the back of an SFIO postcard. OURS: Office universitaire de recherche socialiste. Archived from the original on 2014-12-21.
- "Anarcoefemèrides del 30 de novembre - Henri Beylie" (in Catalan). Estel negre ateneu llibertari.
- Chambelland, Colette (1999). Pierre Monatte: une autre voix syndicaliste. Editions de l'Atelier. ISBN 978-2-7082-3460-4.
- "Son Histoire". Collėge Amédée Dunois. Archived from the original on 2012-07-21.
