= Émile Gravelle =

French individualist anarchist and naturist activist, writer and painter

Émile Gravelle (1855–1920) was a French individualist anarchist and naturist activist, writer and painter. He published the review L'État Naturel (1894–1898) and collaborated with Henri Zisly and Henri Beylie on La Nouvelle Humanité, Le Naturien (1898), Le Sauvage (1898–1899), L'Ordre Naturel (1905), and La Vie Naturelle (1907–1914). His ideas were important in individualist anarchist circles in France as well as Spain, where Federico Urales (pseudonym of Joan Montseny) promoted the ideas of Gravelle and Zisly in La Revista Blanca (1898–1905).
