= Henri Beylie =

French accountant and naturist (1870–1944)

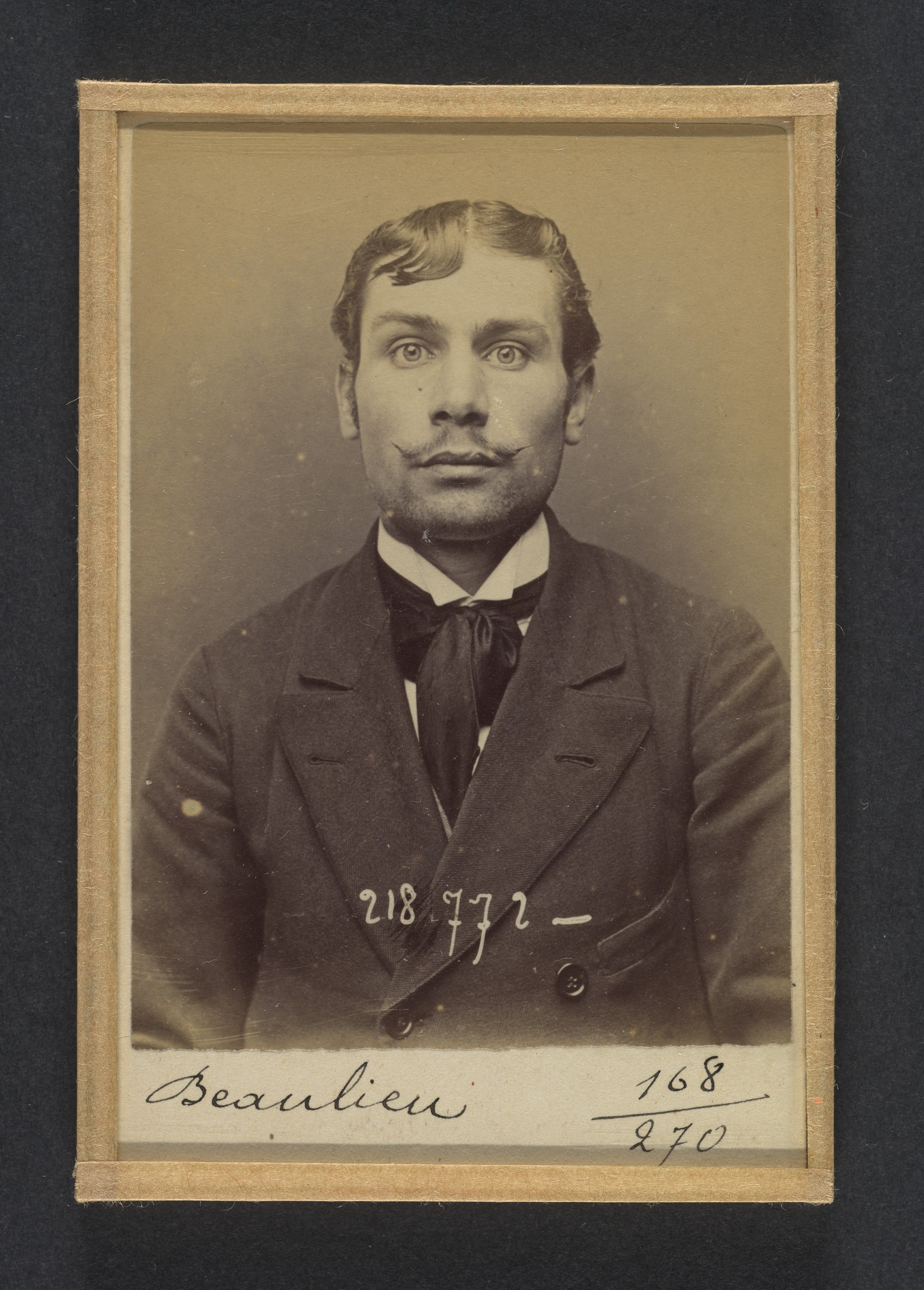
- Henri Beylie's mugshot by Alphonse Bertillon (1894)
- Born: Henri Félix Camille Beaulieu; 30 November 1870; Paris, France
- Died: 1944
- Occupation: Accountant
- Known for: Naturist anarchism

Henri Félix Camille Beaulieu (known as Henri Beylie; 30 November 1870 – 1944) was a French accountant, naturist, anti-militarist, anarchist and then communist. He wrote many articles in radical journals. In his later years he was active in the Committee of Social Defence (CDS), an organization that helped political prisoners and exiles.

== Early years ==
Henri Félix Camille Beaulieu was born in Paris on 30 November 1870. His parents were Charles Beaulieu and Jeanne Beylie. a seamstress. At a young age, he was a non-commissioned officer in the African Battalions, but was dismissed for "collective revolt and protest". On returning to the metropolis, he mixed in libertarian circles in Montmartre and began to publish articles in La Revue Libertaire (1893–94). After anarchists staged several attacks in Paris in 1893, there was a wave of arrests. In January 1894, Beylie, Henri Gauche and Henri Guerin were arrested questioned by a judge. Gauche and Guerin were the editors of La revue libertaire (Paris, December 1893 – February 1894). The three briefly took refuge in Brussels, Belgium.

== Naturist anarchist ==
After his return to France, Henri Beaulieu worked as a plumber for the Northern Railway, then in 1895, he became a bank employee. He participated in "naturist" libertarian groups led by Henri Zisly and Jules Bariol in Paris. Between July 1894 and February 1898 Beaulieu, Émile Gravelle and Henri Zisly published four numbers of L'État Naturel which advocated naturism, vegetarianism and veganism. Between 1895 and 1898 the three men published the monthly La Nouvelle Humanité, which proclaimed that humans would be released from slavery through a healthy diet and outdoors living. Writing under the pseudonym Henri Beylie, he contributed to various other libertarian publications. He was in contact with the paper Tribune Libre published in Charleroi, Pennsylvania by French miners who had emigrated to the US.

On 10 September 1898, Beylie married Clémentine Bontoux and found work as an accountant. The naturist group was dissolved in 1898, and he joined the fight to defend Alfred Dreyfus. In the summer of 1899, Beylie left this cause, dissatisfied with the way that Sébastien Faure was handling the case. He continued to contribute to various anarchist publications. In 1901, another naturist group was formed, and from June to October 1901 Beylie edited Le Bulletin de l'Harmonie. In 1901, he also contributed to the Cercle d’études sociales (Circle of Social Studies: CES) in Paris. In February 1902, the naturist group dissolved due to disagreement between those such as Beylie and Zisly who thought it was necessary to make a radical break by retiring from the world, and those who thought the excesses of urban civilization could be moderated without sacrificing the benefits of progress.

In 1902, Beylie and Georges Butaud co-founded the "milieu libre" anarchist society, with the goal of "creating and developing a free environment in France". Early in 1903, this gave rise to the Milieu Libre de Vaux (Free Commune of Vaux) located in Essômes-sur-Marne, Picardy. G. Butaud was the facilitator. From November 1903, the anarchist colony was the target of an attack some libertarian journalists, and the 5–12 December 1903 issue of Le Libertaire published a negative report on the colony. Beylie and Butaud answered in the colony's monthly bulletin of December 1903, giving a positive report of ten months of communism. However, in February 1907, the experiment came to an end.

== Anarcho-communist ==
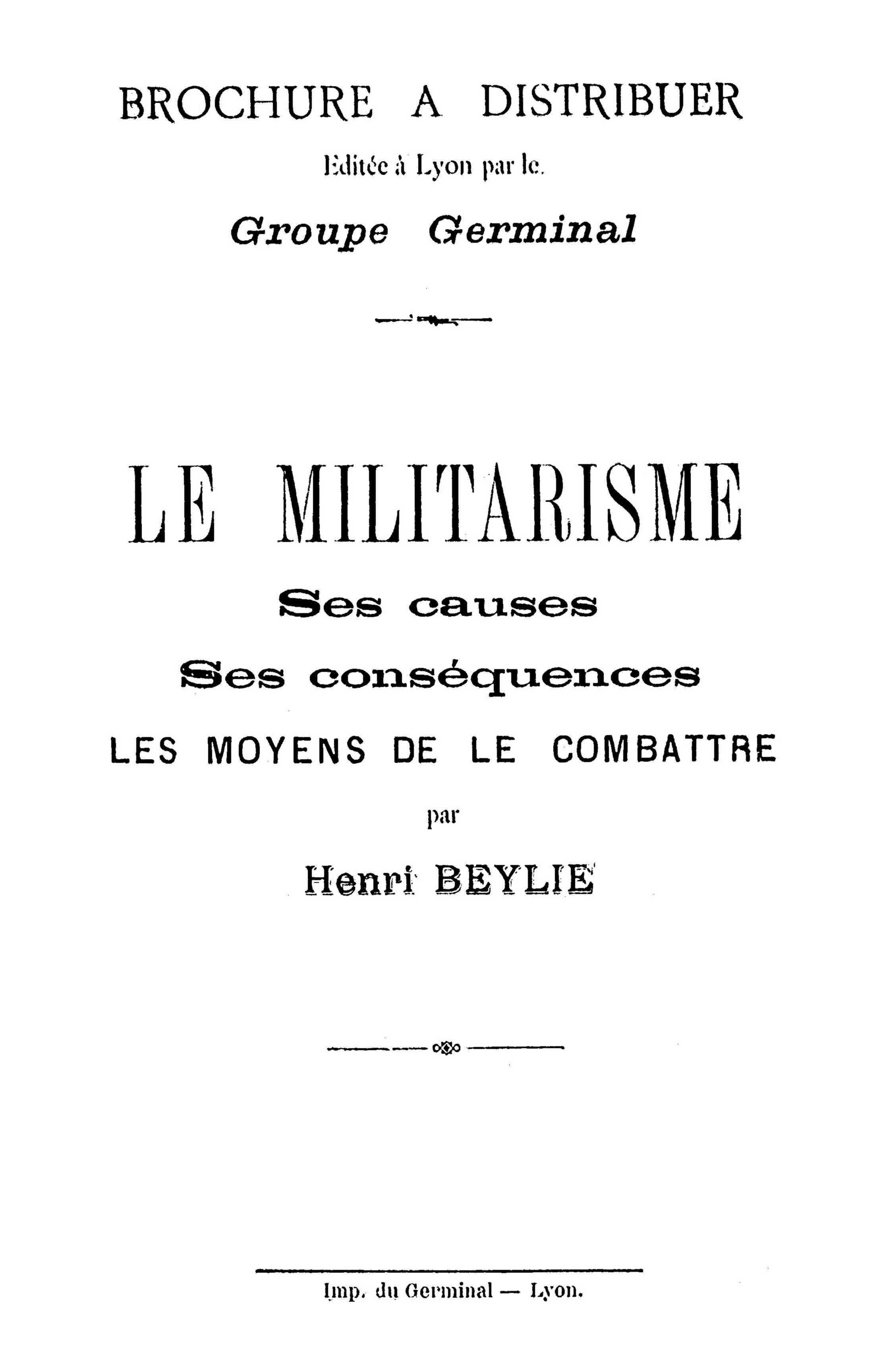
Cover of Le Militarisme. Ses causes, ses conséquences, les moyens de le combattre Brochure published by the groupe Germinal of Lyon, 1903

In December 1902, Beylie was one of the founders of the Ligue antimilitariste, along with fellow anarchists Georges Yvetot, Paraf-Javal, Albert Libertad and Émile Janvion. This was to become the French section of the Association internationale antimilitariste (AIA), which was the subject of intense police surveillance. Beylie was secretary-treasurer of the league. In 1903, he published the brochure Le militarisme. Ses causes, ses conséquences, les moyens de le combattre. Beylie was a member of the First of May society, whose members were arrested on the night of 29 April 1906 when they were putting up a poster in the street of Paris called the Manifeste abstentionniste et antimilitariste, and were accused of anarchist propaganda. They were later pardoned. From 24–31 August 1907, he attended the International Anarchist Congress in Amsterdam with Pierre Monatte, Benoît Broutchoux, René de Marmande, Amédée Dunois and others. In 1908, he joined the Anarchist Federation of the Seine and Seine-et-Oise.

Beylie became a member of the Committee of Social Defence (CDS), an organization that helped political prisoners and exiles. From 1909 to 1912, he worked for the Bulletin du Comité de Défense Sociale. At the end of 1910 the police accused him of inciting soldier to abandon their arms and desert. In February 1912, representing the CDS, he was a member of the committee that prepared the funeral of Albert Aernoult. From March to May 1912, Beylie participated in the Anti-Parliamentary Revolutionary Committee (RAC) of the Confédération Générale du Travail (CGT). He led a campaign for abstention from the municipal elections in May. In December 1912, he participated on the board of Le Libertaire, and in 1913, the following year, was a supporter of La Bataille Syndicaliste.

Beylie was registered by the police in the Carnet B list of anarchists. With the outbreak of World War I (1914–18), he was mobilized in the 14th Territorial Infantry Regiment and assigned to an office job. In April and May 1918, he helped found the pacifist paper La Plèbe. After the war, he was again active in the CDS. He was a delegate to the congresses of the Anarchist Union (UA) in Paris in 1920 and 1923. At the 1923 congress, he was elected to the board of Le Libertaire, to which he contributed. In March 1932, he was appointed secretary of the CDS. In January 1937, he was still secretary of CDS and working as an accountant in Paris. Henri Beylie died in 1944.

== Publications ==
He wrote for many journals, including:

- La Revue Libertaire (1893–94)
- L'État Naturel (1894–98)
- La Nouvelle Humanité (1895–98)
- La Débâcle Social (1896)
- Bulletin de l'Harmonie (1896–1901)
- La Vérité, weekly organ of libertarian communist, (1896–97)
- Tribune Libre (1896–1900)
- Vérité (1896–97)
- Le Cravacheur (1898)
- Le Naturien (1898)
- Le Cri de Révolte (1898–99)
- L'Homme Libre (1899)
- Le Bulletin de l'Harmonie (1901)
- Émancipation (1901)
- Le Flambeau (1901–02)
- Le Réveil de l'Esclave (1902–03)
- L'Insurgé (1903–09)
- Revue Communiste (1903–4)
- L'Ennemi du Peuple (1903–1904)
- Nouvelle Humanité (1905)
- L'Ordre (1905–07)
- Ordre Naturel (1905)
- Terre et Liberté (1905–06)
- Le Combat Social (1907–09)
- Vie Naturelle (1907–14)
- Bulletin du Comité de Défense Sociale (1909–12)
- L'Insurgé (1910–11)
- La Plèbe
- Le Libertaire

He was the author of two pamphlets:

- Beylie, Henri; Zisly, Henri (1872–1945) (1901). La Conception libertaire naturienne : exposé du naturisme (in French). Paris: H. Zisly. p. 16.
- Beylie, Henri (1903). Le Militarisme, ses causes, ses conséquences, les moyens de le combattre. Lyon: Groupe Germinal. p. 8.

== Sources ==
- "Anarcoefemèrides del 30 de novembre - Henri Beylie" (in Catalan). Estel negre ateneu llibertari.
- Miller, Paul B. (2002-03-14). From Revolutionaries to Citizens: Antimilitarism in France, 1870–1914. Duke University Press. ISBN 0-8223-8058-7.
- R.D. (2011-01-28). "BEYLIE Henri (BEAULIEU Félix, dit)". Dictionnaire des militants anarchistes.
