= International Anti-Militarist Association =

International Antimilitarist Association
- Association internationale antimilitariste
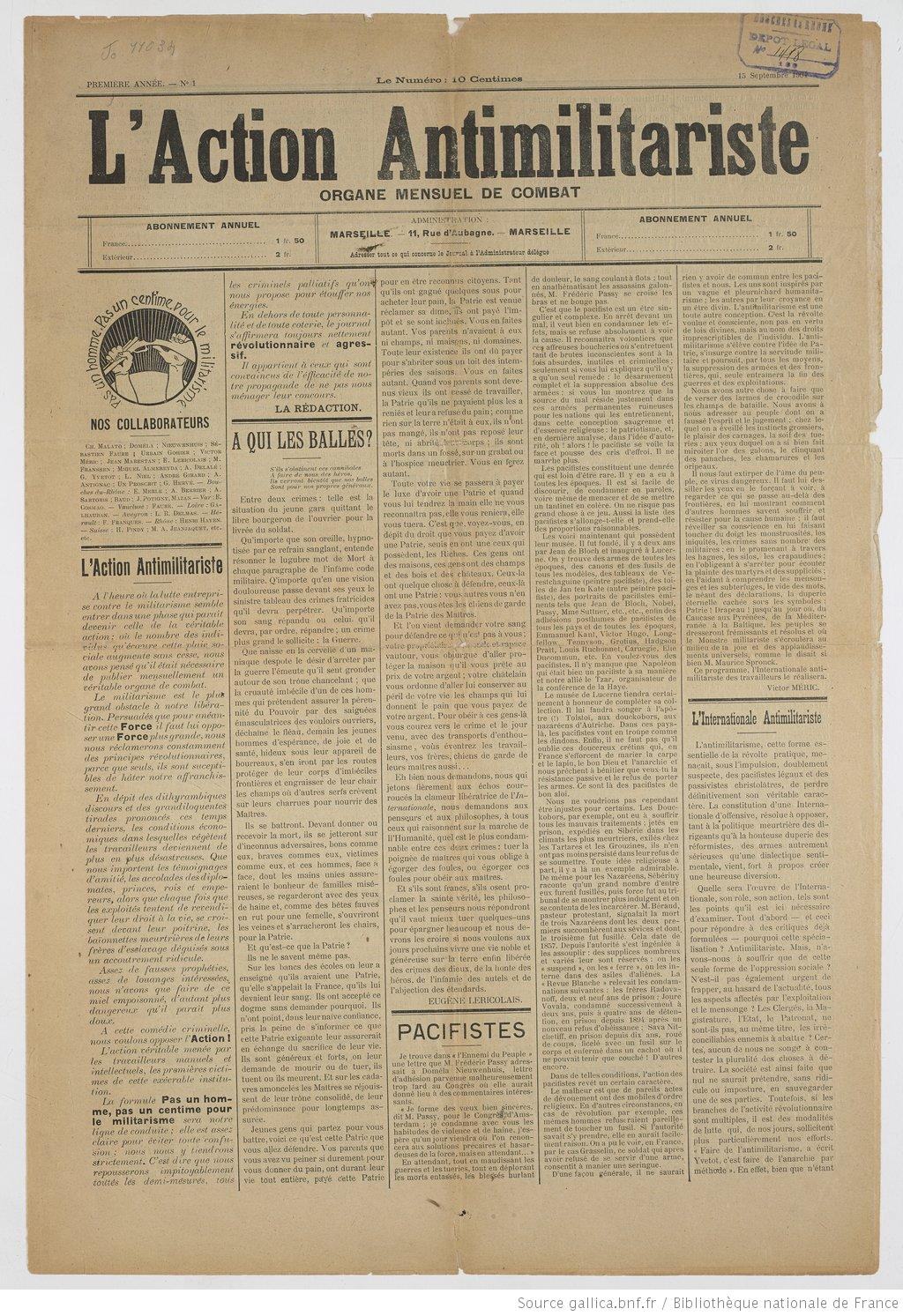
- First issue of L'Action Antimilitariste, the journal of the AIA
- Abbreviation: AIA
- Formation: 26 June 1904
- Founder: Ferdinand Domela Nieuwenhuis
- Dissolved: 1939
- Purpose: Antimilitarism
- Headquarters: 33 rue de la Grange-aux-Belles, Paris, France
- Region served: Europe
- Members: Largely anarchist
- Publication: L'Action Antimilitariste; De Wapens Neder
- Affiliations: International Anti-Militarist Commission (IAK)

The International Antimilitarist Association (French: Association internationale antimilitariste, AIA) was a pacifist association founded in Amsterdam in 1904 that was dedicated to fighting militarism. Although technically open to all political views, it was dominated by anarchists. The members agreed that the workers should revolt if war were declared, but disagreed on whether soldiers should desert. They were subjected to police surveillance and arrests. By 1908 the association had few remaining members.

== Background ==
In December 1902 Georges Yvetot was one of the founders of the Ligue antimilitariste, along with fellow anarchists Henri Beylie, Paraf-Javal, Albert Libertad and Émile Janvion. The Ligue antimilitariste was to become the French section of the Association internationale antimilitariste (AIA). Beylie was secretary-treasurer of the league. In 1903 he published the brochure Le militarisme. Ses causes, ses conséquences, les moyens de le combattre.

== Foundation ==
The founder of the AIA was the Dutch pastor Ferdinand Domela Nieuwenhuis of Amsterdam, a socialist who considered that militarism was created by the capitalist press, politicians and education. The anarchists Charles Malato, Urbain Gohier and Victor Méric were founding members of the AIA, also called the Association internationale antimilitariste des travailleurs (AIAT), in 1904. Yvetot and Miguel Almereyda (Eugène Vigo) led the French section and sat on the AIA committee. The AIA was open to workers of all political leanings, including socialists, syndicalists and anarchists. Yvetot wrote in the AIA bulletin, "There is no need that is more urgent than antimilitarist propaganda. ... This is why, outside of political groups, outside even of economic groups, the AIA truly has its raison d'être."

== History ==
On 26-28 June 1904 the AIA held its founding congress in Amsterdam, with a 12-member delegation from France. L'Ennemi du Peuple reported that there were 4,500 attendees at the last public meeting, but this is probably an exaggeration. The congress was dominated by anarchists, but also included syndicalists and communists. The question of whether refusal of military service should be AIA strategy was hotly debated. Libertad and Paraf-Javal considered the simple call for desertion as too timid, and refused to participate further.

Although technically not linked to the Confédération Générale du Travail, (CGT), the AIA moved its headquarters into the CGT building and had many of the same members. The AIA was the subject of intense police surveillance. The AIA held a national congress in Saint-Étienne on 14-16 July 1905, attended by delegates from across France. It was agreed that the AIA was committed to a workers' revolution in the event of war, but that it was neutral on the subject of desertion.

After publishing a poster aimed at conscripts, twenty eight members of the AIA were tried on 26–30 December 1905. Twenty six received harsh sentences, including Gustave Hervé with four years in prison and Miguel Almereyda with three years. Eventually they were pardoned on 14 July 1906. The second AIA congress was held in Amsterdam on 30–31 August 1907. However, by 1907 the organization was in terminal decline in France, with only small groups remaining in the main cities. In September 1907 Le Libertaire called for formation of a new French antimilitarist federation. At a meeting in Paris in October 1907 the secretary-treasurer for greater Paris was expelled for extorting subscription fees, and for rumors that he was being paid by the police.

The AIA tried to revive itself in March 1908 under the leadership of Georges Durupt and Gaston Delpech, but was unable to obtain an adequate base of support. Since 1921 organization cooperated with the War Resisters' International. Organization remained active in the Netherlands and ceased to exist in 1939.

== Publications ==
L'Action antimilitariste : organe mensuel de combat, the journal of the AIA, appeared in 1904 and 1905.

AIA publications included:

- À l'armée, Paris: AIA, p. 15
- Méric, Victor, Le Bétail : pièce antimilitariste en un acte, Preface by Charles Malato, Paris: AIA, p. 22
- Aux conscrits, Paris: AIA, 1904, p. 8
- Méric, Victor (1904), Lettre à un conscrit, Paris: AIA, p. 8
- Yvetot, Georges (1904), La Vache à lait : lettre à un Saint-Cyrien, Preface by Urbain Gohier, Paris: AIA, p. 55
- L'AIA, son but, ses moyens, son action, Paris: AIA, 1904, p. 18
- Pas un homme, pas un centime pour le militarisme, Paris: AIA, 1904
- Merle, Eugène, Le Mensonge patriotique, Paris: AIA, p. 30

== Sources ==
- "AIA — AIAT (Association internationale antimilitariste (des travailleurs))". Bianco (in French).
- "Anarcoefemèrides del 30 de novembre - Henri Beylie" (in Catalan). Estel negre ateneu llibertari.
- Angenot, Marc (2003-01-01). L'antimilitarisme: idéologie et utopie. Presses Université Laval. ISBN 978-2-7637-8035-1.
- "L'Action antimilitariste : organe mensuel de combat". Gallica.
- "l'Association Internationale Antimilitariste". Ephéméride Anarchiste 28 juin.
- Miller, Paul B. (2002-03-14). From Revolutionaries to Citizens: Antimilitarism in France, 1870–1914. Duke University Press. ISBN 0-8223-8058-7.
