= Restaurant Foyot =

Former restaurant in Paris, France (closed 1937)

Coordinates: 48°50′59″N 2°20′15″E

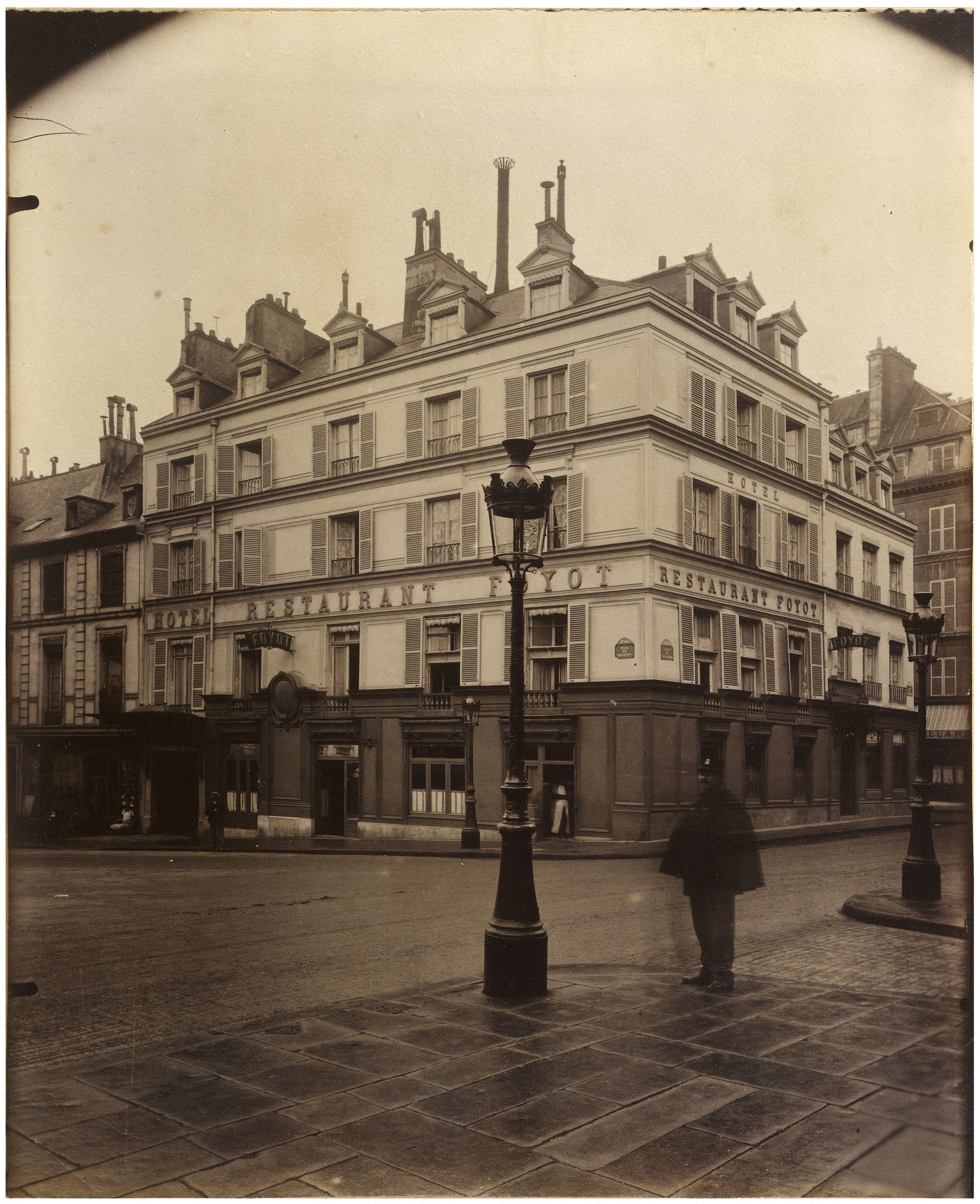
Photographed by Eugène Atget.

The Restaurant Foyot was a Parisian restaurant located at 33, rue de Tournon. It closed in 1937, after 169 years of operation.

It acquired its name when Nicolas Foyot, the personal chef of King Louis-Philippe, bought the restaurant after the Revolution of 1848. In 1891, he was succeeded by Léopold Mourier, a great figure in French cuisine, who created many of the food items bearing the name of the restaurant, such as pigeon Foyot, côte de veau Foyot, and the Béarnaise sauce still sometimes referred to as Foyot sauce.

It was located across from the Senate and the Odéon Theater.

Like many Parisian fine-dining restaurants, the Restaurant Foyot prepared and served zoo animals from the Jardin des plantes during the Siege of Paris (1870-71). According to one anecdote, the restaurant had previously mounted a publicity stunt involving displaying live bears and pretending to serve bear meat.

The hôtel Foyot, located above the restaurant, rented rooms to many of the leading intellectuals and artists of the time, including George Santayana, T.S. Eliot, Dorothy Parker, and Rainer Maria Rilke.

The restaurant is perhaps best known today for the bombing that took place there in 1894.

During World War I, the restaurant was requisitioned by the American military, and General Pershing was given a private dining room there.

An English-language Paris restaurant guide from 1921 says: "Of such a renowned house as Foyot's, one need say but little [...] Established over a century, it has, for scores of years, maintained its rank among the best restaurants of the capital. Good cuisine and attendance; remarkable cellar."

In 1931, the New Yorker referred to a new restaurant in Midtown Manhattan as "A Foyot's in the Fifties".

On its closing, the New York Times eulogized the Restaurant Foyot as a "gourmets' temple which for decades has been regarded as a national institution".
