= Georges Yvetot =

French typographer and anarcho-syndicalist (1868–1942)

Georges Louis François Yvetot
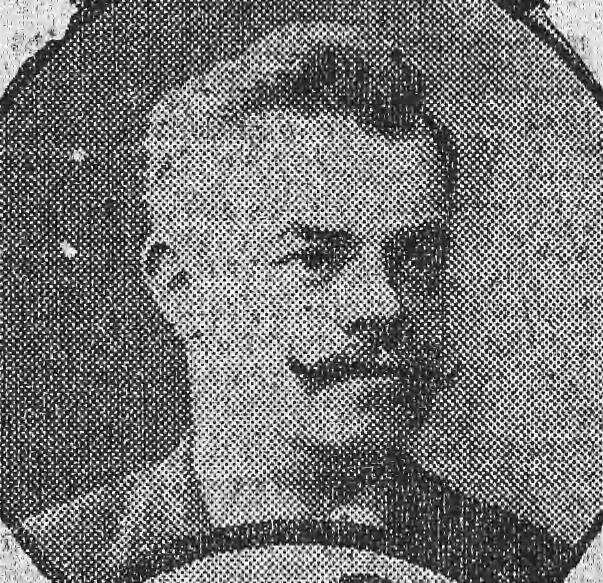
- Georges Yvetot in L'Humanité (27 May 1913)
- Born: 20 July 1868; Paris, France
- Died: 11 May 1942 (aged 73); Paris, France
- Occupations: Typographer, militant activist and trade unionist

Georges Louis François Yvetot (20 July 1868 – 11 May 1942) was a French typographer, anarcho-syndicalist and anti-militarist. He was secretary general of the Fédération des Bourses de travail (Federation of Workers' Councils) and deputy secretary general of the Confédération générale du travail (CGT – General Confederation of Labour) in the period leading up to World War I (1914–18). He kept a low profile during the war, and in 1918 was dismissed from the CGT leadership. After the war he contributed to many anarchist journals. He died in poverty during World War II (1939–45).

== Early years ==
Georges Louis François Yvetot was born in Paris on 20 July 1868 to a father of Norman origin. He was born in the Minimes barracks, where his father was a gendarme. His mother died, and then his father, while he was young. He was raised by the Brothers of Christian Doctrine and the Auteuil center for orphan apprentices, where he trained as a typographer from 1880 to 1887. He contracted pulmonary tuberculosis and was therefore not required to serve in the army. From 1887 to 1894 he worked as a typesetter for La Patrie, accepting a wage below standard.

== Pre-war union leader ==
Yvetot became an anarchist under the influence of Fernand Pelloutier, whom he helped as typographer on the Ouvrier des Deux Mondes. He was working at the Petit Soir when Pelloutier died, and he succeeded him as secretary general of the Fédération des Bourses on 22 May 1901. He was appointed with the help of the socialists Jean Allemane and Paul Brousse. He was reelected in this position, under slightly different titles, by every congress until the start of World War I (1914–18). His aggressive behavior and physical appearance earned him the nickname "bulldog". He was a follower of Pierre-Joseph Proudhon as an anarchist, and continued to be so after becoming a syndicalist. He was very reluctant about the Fédération des Bourses merging with the CGT at the 9th congress in Nice in September 1901.

From the Montpellier Congress of the CGT in September 1902, the secretary of the Bourses section was automatically secretary of the GCT, and thus in title was second in the trade union leadership. Yvetot presented the report on the Federation or Section of the Bourses at the CGT congresses in Nice (September 1901), Algiers (September 1902), Bourges (September 1904) and Amiens (October 1906). He did not attend the Marseille congress in October 1908 since he was imprisoned. He attended the CGT congresses at Toulouse (October 1910) and Le Havre (September 1912). At these two congresses he also reported on the Voix du Peuple. Yvetot represent French trade unionism at various international conferences in the inter-war years.

In December 1902 Yvetot was one of the founders of the Ligue antimilitariste, along with fellow anarchists Henri Beylie, Paraf-Javal, Albert Libertad and Émile Janvion. This was to become the French section of the Association internationale antimilitariste (AIA), which was the subject of intense police surveillance. The AIA was open to workers of all political leanings, including socialists, syndicalists and anarchists. Yvetot wrote in the AIA bulletin, "There is no need that is more urgent than antimilitarist propaganda. ... This is why, outside of political groups, outside even of economic groups, the AIA truly has its raison d'être." In 26–28 June 1904 the AIA held its founding congress in Amsterdam, with a 12-member delegation from France. L'Ennemi du Peuple reported that there were 4,500 attendees at the last public meeting, but this is probably an exaggeration. The congress was dominated by anarchists, but also included syndicalists and communists. The question of whether refusal of military service should be AIA strategy was hotly debated. Yvetot and Miguel Almereyda (Eugène Vigo) led the French section and sat on the AIA committee.

Although technically not linked to the CGT, the AIA moved its headquarters into the CGT building and had many of the same members. The CGT members did not all share Yvetot's uncompromising anti-militarism. Thus Louis Niel wrote in 1905 that, "In case of war, I do not believe that a general strike is possible today." Niel thought it was worth fighting for liberties that had been achieved in one's country when they were threatened with destruction by a country that was more reactionary. Yvetot rejected this, stating baldly, "Workers can be patriotic if they have the temperament of dogs". At the 1906 Amiens congress of the CGT Yvetot succeeded in passing a strongly unpatriotic motion, despite resistance from the leadership.

Yvetot opposed compulsory arbitration and demanded the freedom to strike. Yvetot always strongly defended the independence of trade unionism from political parties, and remained opposed to any agreement with the Socialist party. He was often arrested and convicted for his propaganda, and spent several periods in prison. Thus in 1906 Yvetot, Louis Grandidier and Gustave Hervé were imprisoned for anti-militarist activities. Yvetot ran an organization called the Sou du Soldat (The soldier's farthing) which in theory helped young syndicalists by sending them small amounts of money when they were conscripted into the army. The police saw the organization's goal as spreading revolutionary propaganda among the troops. In the spring of 1913 conscripts demonstrated against an extension of the duration of their military service, and on 1 July 1913 Yvetot and other CGT leaders were arrested. They were released, but on 26 March 1914 were tried in absentia, and Yvetot was sentenced to a year in prison and a fine of 100 francs. An appeal was pending when the war broke out.

On 28 July 1914 Yvetot and the syndicalist leaders Léon Jouhaux, Georges Dumoulin and Alphonse Merrheim held meetings at the Salle Wagram where they opposed the war, and the Confederal Committee of the CGT stated that "In the current situation, the CGT reminds everyone that it is absolutely opposed to any war. War is not the solution to any problem. It as and remains the most frightening of human calamities. Down with war! Long live Peace!" A few days later France was at war. Many CGT leaders were affected by the surge of patriotism and actively supported the defense of republican liberties against German aggression.

== Later years ==
During World War I Yvetot kept his title but gave up his union work and took a job as a typesetter. Soon after he accepted leadership of the National Association of War Orphans in Étretat, and devoted himself to helping children. He went to Montenegro and Serbia in 1915 to collect Yugoslav orphans when the Central Powers occupied that country. He was dismissed from the leadership of the CGT in 1918.

In the interwar period Yvetot was no longer militant, apart from pacifist campaigns with which he was associated. He helped with many anarchist periodicals in France and Belgium. These included le Combat (1926-1929), la Conquête du pain (1934-1935), la Patrie humaine (1931-1939), le Raffut (1921-1922), la Revue anarchiste (1929-1936), le Semeur (1923-1936). He worked as a proofreader for Le Journal and l’Information. He joined the proofreaders' union on 1 May 1918 and was on the union committee between 1920 and 1932. He was general secretary of the union from 1921 to 1925.

On the eve of World War II (1939–45) Yvetot signed a manifesto entitled Immediate Peace. Due to his health he avoided prosecution. He was no longer active in the CGT after the war started. In 1940 he underwent a serious operation and lost his job. He became close to destitution. He was briefly president of the Comité ouvrier de secours immédiat, created in March 1942, which helped working families affected by allied bombing. It was widely viewed as a collaborationist organization. Georges Yvetot died suddenly on 11 May 1942 in Paris. He was cremated on 15 May 1942 and his ashes were deposited in Père Lachaise Cemetery in a ceremony attended by two hundred people.

== Selected publications ==
- Pelloutier, Fernand; Yvetot, Georges (1896). L'organisation corporative et l'anarchie: plan de conférence. bibliothèque de l'"Art social.
- Yvetot, Georges (1902). Vers la grève générale. H. Girard.
- Yvetot, Georges; Gohier, U. (1905). La vache à lait. (Lettre à un Saint-Cyrien). Préf. d'U. Gohier. Internationale antimilitariste.
- Yvetot, Georges (1905). Nouveau manuel du soldat. La patrie, l'armée, la guerre. Fédé. des Bourses du Travail.
- Yvetot, Georges (1906). Rapport sur l'établissement du viaticum des bourses présenté à la Conférence des bourses à Amiens, les 15-16 octobre 1906. impr. du Progrès de la Somme.
- Yvetot, Georges (1908). A.B.C. syndicaliste. Groupe de propagande par la Brochure.
- Lorulot, André; Yvetot, Georges (1909). Le Syndicalisme et la transformation sociale. Librairie internationaliste.
- Vernet, Madeleine; Thomas, Albert; Yvetot, Georges (1911). Les sans-famille du prolétariat organisé. L'Avenir Social.
- Yvetot, Georges (1912). Le syndicalisme: Les intellectuels et la C.G.T. La publication sociale.
- Yvetot, Georges (1913). La Triple action de la C.G.T. Le Réveil.
- Yvetot, Georges; Séverine (1913). Ma pensée libre. Conférence écrite à la Prison de la Santé et lue à l'Université Populaire par Séverine, le lundi 3 novembre 1913. L'Université Populaire.

== Sources ==
- Cecil, Hugh; Liddle, Peter (2003-04-01). Facing Armageddon: The First World War Experience. Pen and Sword. ISBN 978-1-4738-1397-7.
- Dubief, Henri (2014). "Yvetot, Georges (1868-1942)". Maitron. Centre National de la Recherche Scientifique. Archived from the original on 2014-10-19.
- Goldman, Emma; Falk, Candace; Pateman, Barry; Moran, Jessica M. (2005). Emma Goldman: Making speech free, 1902-1909. University of California Press. ISBN 978-0-520-22569-5.
- Miller, Paul B. (2002-03-14). From Revolutionaries to Citizens: Antimilitarism in France, 1870–1914. Duke University Press. ISBN 0-8223-8058-7.
- Papayanis, Nicholas (1985). Alphonse Merrheim. Springer Science & Business Media. ISBN 978-94-009-5155-6.

Trade union offices
Preceded by Alexandre Luquet	Administrative Secretary of the General Confederation of Labour; 1906–1918	Succeeded by Georges Dumoulin
