= Leopold Mourier =

French restauranteur and philanthropist (1862–1923)

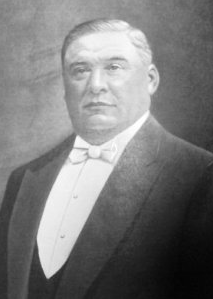
Portrait of Léopold Mourier in the Maison des Cuisiniers

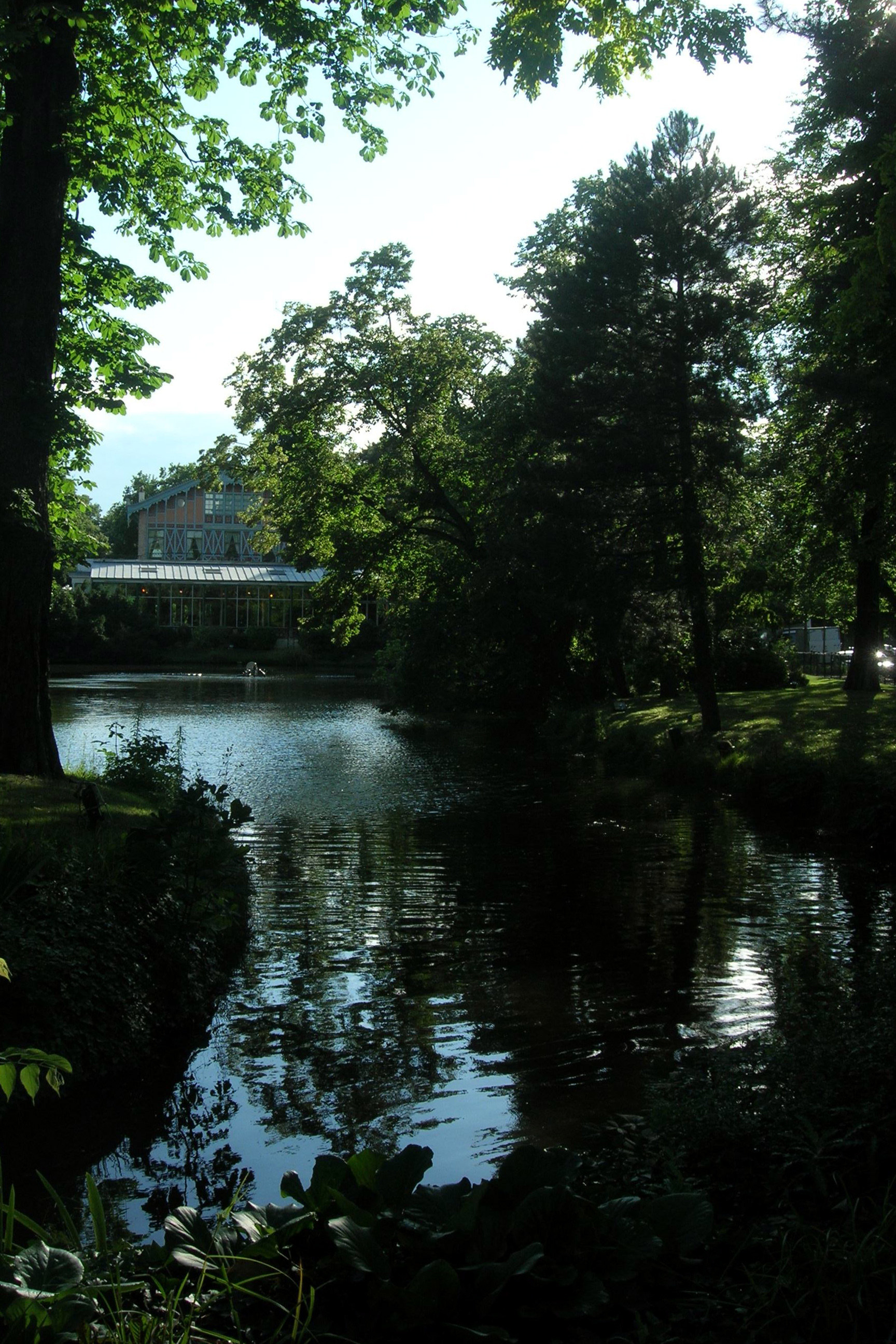
Pavillon d'Armenonville in the Bois de Boulogne in Paris

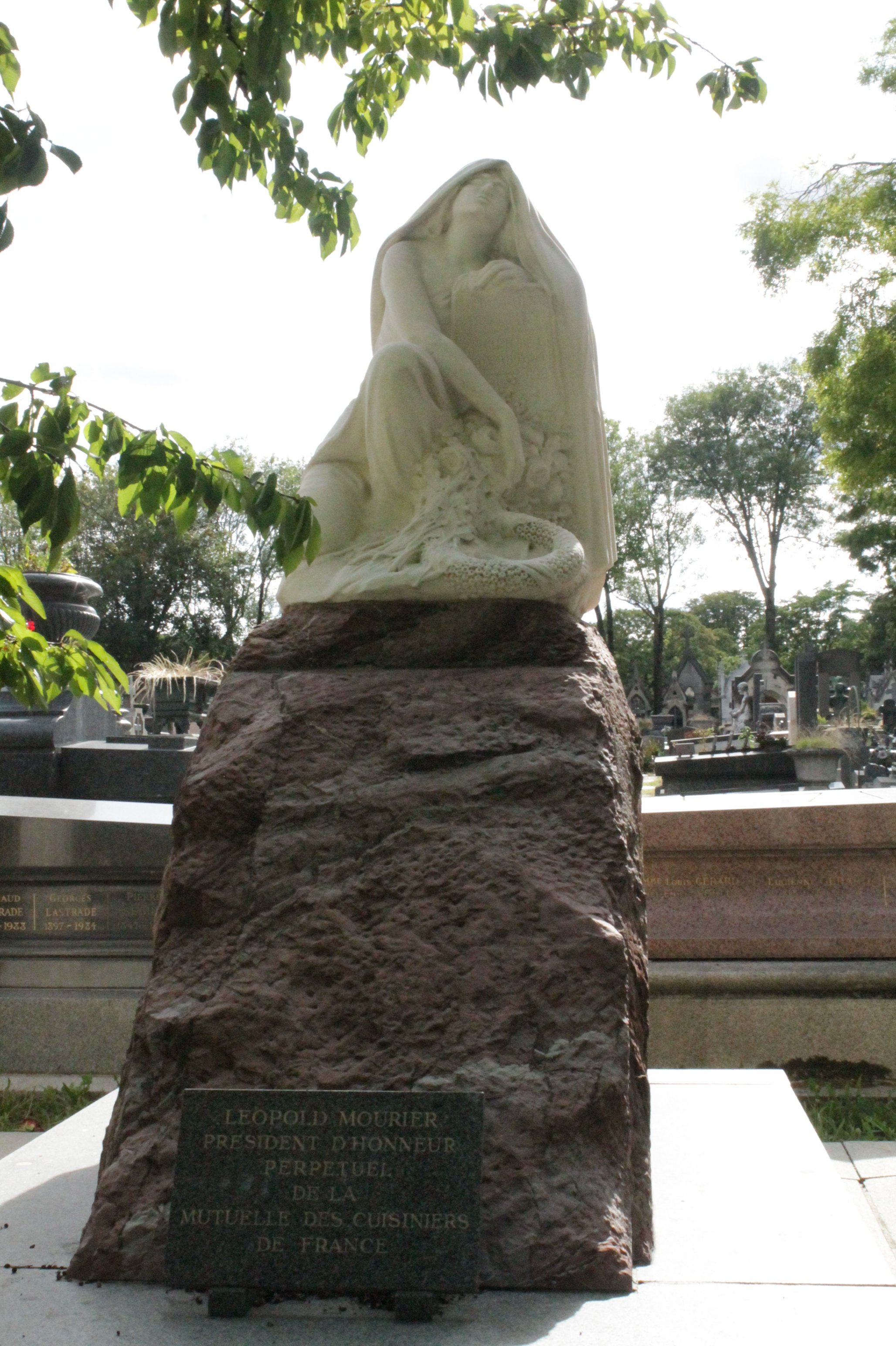
The grave of Léopold Mourier, Père Lachaise Cemetery in Paris

Léopold Étienne Mourier (French pronunciation: [leɔpɔl(d) etjɛn muʁje]), Legion d'Honor (1862–1923) was a French chef, restaurateur, gastronome, and philanthropist.

His greatest gastronomic claim to fame is the creation of Lobster Thermidor in 1891.

== Life ==
He was born on 30 May 1862 in the village of Montjoux near Dieulefit, the son of Jean Étienne Mourier (1836–1865), an innkeeper, and his wife, Clarice Ernestine Turc. Léopold had a twin brother: Louis Ernest Mourier. Their father died the year of his birth. His mother then ran the Auberge "Serre du Turc", which specialized in fine foods.

From around 1875 he was apprenticed as a chef with the Campe brothers in Avignon then around 1877 joined his cousin Ms Rivier who was a chef in Grenoble.

In the summer of 1880 he obtained exemption from military service and went to work at the "Notta" restaurant in Paris.

In 1883 he moved to the "Maison Maire" restaurant in Paris and became its main chef in 1886. The restaurant was owned by Ms Paillard and stood on Chaussée d'Antin. Some records state that the illustrious Auguste Escoffier worked at the "Maison Maire" until he went to Monte Carlo in 1884. At the Maire, Mourier created "Pommes Mayor" and "Pommes Ernestine" (named after his mother). In 1890 he succeeded Nicolas Foyot as the premiere chef in Paris. He acquired the Foyot restaurant in 1891 and the famous Cafe de Paris on the Avenue de l'Opera soon after.

In 1891, at the launch of the controversial play Thermidor, he created Lobster Thermidor for the cast. Some records link this creation to Escoffier, but Escoffier was not in Paris at this time and the creation was certainly born in Paris. The play was banned for 5 years and relaunched in 1896, by which time the dish was well-established.

In 1900 he became owner and chef of the Pavillon d'Armenonville in the Bois de Boulogne in Paris: a magnificent building set on a lake in the wood, which he also made his home. From the same time he was asked to create many huge banquets, set in the Elysee Palace. In 1908 opened the "Pre-Catalan". In 1904 he was the first chef to be awarded the Legion d'Honour by the French government for services to cooking.

In 1910 he opened the "Fouquet" restaurant on a prominent corner on the Champs Elysees. This restaurant is still (2019) operational.

His great wealth allowed him to create a retirement home for chefs (who often were so dedicated that they had no family). This is situated in Cormeilles-en-Parisis. In 1912, in his role as President of the Societé des Cuisiniers de Paris, with Francis Carton as manager, he began many projects, including purchasing a six-storey building at 45 Rue Saint Roch that became the society's headquarters under the name of the "Maison des Cuisiniers". In 1913 he provided a relief fund and free health care for impoverished chefs.

He also gave generously to his home town of Montjoux, allowing it to expand.

He died in the Pavillon d'Armenonville on 17 March 1923 and was buried in Père Lachaise Cemetery in north-east Paris. The grave lies on the main north path. Since Mourier had no family, the magnificent grave was erected by his friends. His huge estate was left to the Societé des Cuisiniers.

His successor, Tony Girod, continued to create Lobster Thermidor.

== Recognition ==
A street in Paris is named in his honour.

== Family ==
He married twice: both times in Neuilly sur Seine. Firstly in 1892 to Adele Louise Tabary (1874–1909) aged only 18, and secondly in 1921 to Marie Dussut (1881–1923).

He had no children by either marriage.
