= Henri Zisly =

French anarchist (1872–1945)

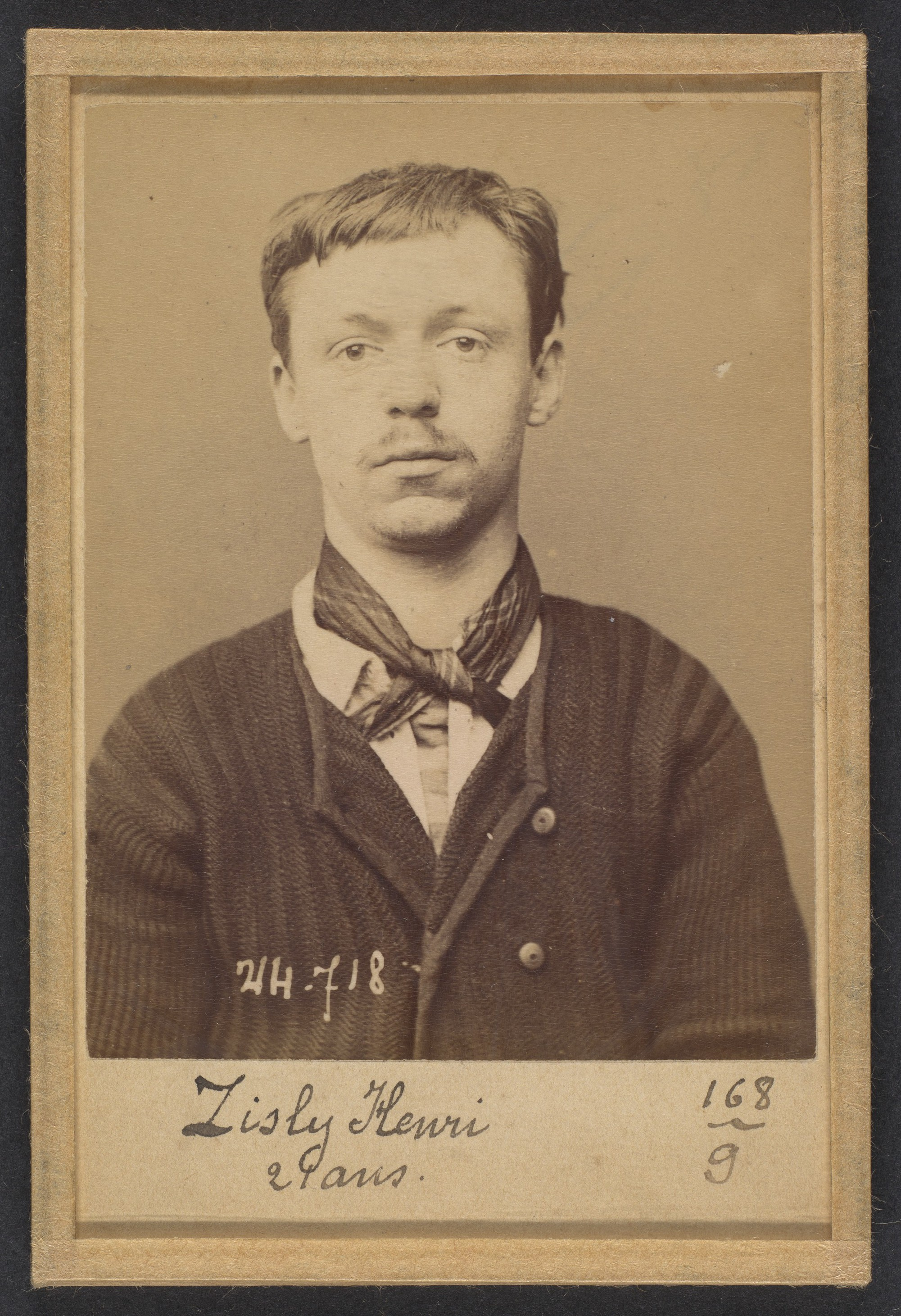
Henri Zisly in 1895

Henri Zisly (2 November 1872 in Paris – 3 January 1945) was a French individualist anarchist and naturist. He participated alongside Henri Beylie and Émile Gravelle in many journals such as La Nouvelle Humanité and La Vie Naturelle, which promoted anarchist-naturism.

Zisly's political activity, "primarily aimed at supporting a return to 'natural life' through writing and practical involvement, stimulated lively confrontations within and outside the anarchist environment. Zisly vividly criticized progress and civilization, which he regarded as 'absurd, ignoble, and filthy.' He opposed industrialization (arguing that machines were inherently authoritarian), defended nudism, advocated a non-dogmatic and non-religious adherence to the 'laws of nature,' recommended a lifestyle based on limited needs and self-sufficiency, and disagreed with vegetarianism, which he considered 'anti-scientific.'"

== Works ==
- En Conquête de l'état naturel, 1899
- Voyage au beau pays de Naturie, 1900
- La Conception du naturisme libertaire, 1920
- Naturisme pratique dans la civilisation, 1928

== See also ==
- La Clairière de Vaux
