= Urbain Gohier =

French lawyer and journalist (1862–1951)

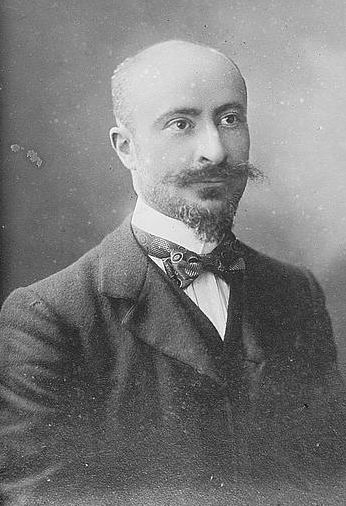
Urbain Gohier

Urbain Gohier (born Urbain Degoulet, December 17, 1862 in Versailles – June 29, 1951) was a French lawyer and journalist best known for his publication of the antisemitic forgery The Protocols of the Elders of Zion in France.

Orphaned as a young man, Gohier took the surname of his adoptive father, and the issue of his family origin remained a lifelong personal issue. A brilliant high school student at Collège Stanislas in Paris, he obtained a BA and a law degree.

In 1884, he became editor of the royalist daily Le Soleil. In 1897, upon the foundation of the socialist daily L'Aurore, its director Ernest Vaughan called Gohier to join the writing team. He became a leading journalist there, along with Georges Clemenceau.

An indefatigable pamphleteer, Gohier—a "monarchist-unionist"—maintained a policy that was pro-Dreyfus, antisemitic, anti-militarist, and socialist. He took a strongly anti-military position in the Dreyfus affair. Perhaps because his willingness to stand up for justice was stronger than his antisemitism, Émile Zola was one of his friends. He provoked the resignation of Clemenceau from L'Aurore.

In 1898, he was prosecuted after the publication of the anti-militarist pamphlet L'armée contre la nation (The Army Against the Nation); he was ultimately acquitted. In December 1905 he was sentenced to a year in prison for his participation in an international anti-militarist action allied with anarchists.

At the turn of the century, he joined the neo-Malthusian movement alongside Paul Robin, André Girard, Clovis Hugues, Albert Lantoine, A. Daudé-Bancel, Laurent Tailhade, and George Yvetot. Gohier edited the newspaper Grenoble The Right of the People in 1902, then The Old Friar in 1903 and the Cri de Paris in 1904, then became editor of the antisemitic Vieille France from 1916 to 1924. Gohier was also a leading publisher of the antisemitic forgery The Protocols of the Elders of Zion in France, circa 1920. He also contributed to The Libertarian.

During World War II, Gohier supported the Vichy government.

Convicted in 1944, he died in oblivion in 1951, leaving a considerable body of pamphleteering along with other such antisemitic polemicists of his time as Édouard Drumont, Léon Daudet, Henri Béraud, Dominique Pierre and René Benjamin.

== Bibliography ==
- Laurent Joly (2007), "Anti-Semitic and anti-Semitism in the House of Deputies under the Third Republic," Journal of Modern History, 3 / 2007 (No. 54-3), p. 63-90.
- Laurent Joly, Archives Juives, vol. 39, n° 2, 2006, p. 96-109. On Gohier and Coty.
- Pierre-André Taguieff, Grégoire Kauffmann, Mickaël Lenoire, L'Antisémitisme de plume (1940–1944), études et documents, Paris, Berg International, 1999 ISBN 2-911289-16-1. Contains a complete article of 7 pages on Gohier by Dr. Grégoire Kauffmann, p. 412-418.
