= Laurent Tailhade =

French poet and anarchist (1854–1919)

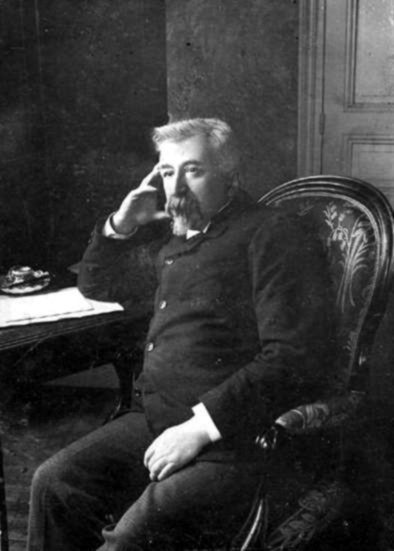
- Born: April 16, 1854; Tarbes, France
- Died: November 1, 1919 (aged 65); Combes-la-Ville, France
- Occupations: poet; anarchist

Laurent Tailhade (French: [lɔʁɑ̃ tajad]; April 16, 1854, Tarbes – November 1, 1919, Combes-la-Ville) was a French satirical poet, anarchist polemicist, essayist, and translator, active in Paris in the 1890s and early 1900s.

In April 1894, Tailhade was injured in the Foyot bombing in Paris while he was having dinner with his partner, Julia Miahle, in a restaurant. The bomb was hidden in a flower pot and placed on the windowsill near them. Tailhade lost an eye in the bombing and needed weeks of recovery.

== Works ==
- Au pays du mufle 1891
- Poèmes élégiaques Vitraux. Vanier, 1891
- A travers les Grouins. Stock, 1899
- Imbéciles et gredins 1900
- L'ennemi du peuple par Henrik Ibsen Societe libre d'edition des gens de lettres, 1900
- La touffe de sauge Editions de la plume, 1901
- La Gynécocratie, Ou La Domination De La Femme. Carrington, Charles. 1902. Preceded by an Etude sur le Masochisme dans l'histoire et les traditions. (with the coll. of Jacques Desroix)
- Lettres familières Collection rationaliste. Librairie de 'La raison', 1904
- Poèmes Aristophanesques. Mercure de France, 1904
- La noir idole, Etude sur la Morphinomanie. Leon Vanier, Editeur; A. Messein, Succr., 1907
- Poèmes éligiaques. Mercure de France, 1907
- Le troupeau d'Aristée. Sansot, 1908
- La farce de la marmite Messein, 1909
- La Feuille à l'envers -Revue en un Acte Messein, 1909
- Pour la paix, Lettre aux conscrits Messein, 1909
- Un Monde Qui Finit. La Dévotion À La Croix-Don Quichote-Appendice Messein, 1910
- De Célimène à Diafoirus. Essai consacré à Molière et à son époque « Misanthropie et misanthropes - la pharmacopée au temps de Molière - notes ». Messein, 1911
- Pages choisies. Vers et proses Messein, 1912
- Quelques fantomes de jadis. (Verlaine. - Auguste Rod de Niederhausern. - Charles Cros. - Vigny) Messein, Collection « Societe des Trente, 1913
- Les commérages de Tybalt. Petits mémoires de la vie 1903–1913. Crès, 1914
- Les livres et les hommes (1916-1917) Vrin, 1917
- Les saisons et les jours Crès, 1917
- Petit bréviaire de la gourmandise, notes sur quelques grands gourmands de l'histoire Messein, 1919
- La douleur. Le vrai mystère de la passion Messein, 1919
- Carnet intime Editions du Sagittaire, Kra, 1920
- Quelques fantômes de jadis Edition française illustrée, 1920
- Les Reflets de Paris (1918-1919) P. Jean Fort, 1921
- Petits Mémoires De La Vie. Mémoires d'écrivains et d'artistes Editions G. Crès, 1921
- Platres Et Marbres. Editions Athéna, 1922
- Des Tragédies d'Eschyle au pessimisme de Tolstoi. La Nouvelle revue critique, 1924
- Epitres Des Hommes Obscurs La Connaissance, 1924
- Le Paillasson. Mœurs De Province. Le livre, 1924
- La médaille qui s'efface. Crès, 1924
- Poésies posthumes Messein, 1925
- Masques Et Visages. Essais Inédits Les éditions du monde moderne, 1925
- Lettres à sa Mere 1874-1891. René van den Berg et Louis Enlart, 1926
- La corne et l'épée. Réflexions sur la tauromachie Messein, 1941

== See also ==
- Anarchism
- Aestheticization of violence

== Sources ==
- Laurent Tailhade ou De la provocation considérée comme un art de vivre. Gilles Picq, 2001, Maisonneuve & Larose, 828 p
- Laurent Tailhade intime. Correspondance publiée et annotée par Madame Laurent-Tailhade. Mercure de France, 1924.
- Laurent Tailhade Au Pays Du Mufle. Quignon, 1927. Memoirs written by his wife.
- Les plus belles pages de Laurent Tailhade. Quignon, 1928.
