= Georges Darien =

French writer (1862–1921)

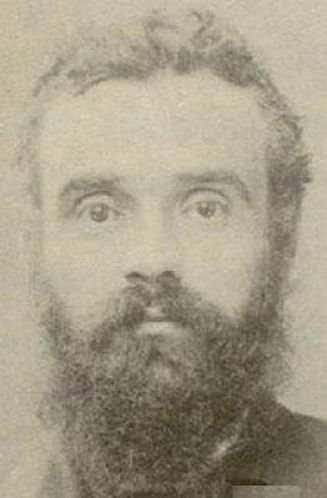
Georges Darien

Georges Darien (pseudonym for Georges Hippolyte Adrien; 1862–1921) was a French writer associated with anarchism and an outspoken advocate of Georgism.

== Life ==
Darien was born into a deeply religious family. On 16 March 1881 he enlisted in the army. Between June 1883 and March 1886 he served in a disciplinary unit, Compagnie de fusiliers de discipline, in North Africa. During his stay in the company he spent about a year in Gafsa, a prison camp located in the town of the same name in Tunisia. Based on this experience, he wrote the novel Biribi discipline militaire (1890).

Shortly before, he had published his first novel, Bas les cœurs! (1890), which narrates the impact of the Franco-Prussian War and the Paris Commune on a provincial bourgeois family. The book inspired a campaign for prison camp reform, which met with moderate success. The Gafsa camp would remain open until 1920. The publication of Les Pharisiens (1890), in which he harshly attacks Édouard Drumont and other anti-Semites, won him the friendship of Bernard Lazare. Between 1893 and 1905, Darien traveled frequently to other countries, especially Belgium, Germany and England, residing for long periods in London. There he would meet his first wife, Suzanne Caroline Abresch, daughter of German parents, a year older than him. They would marry in 1899.

He collaborated with different anarchist publications such as L'Escarmouche, L'Ennemi du peuple and L'En dehors, the latter in collaboration with Zo d'Axa. He participated in 1904 in the Antimilitarist Congress that took place in Amsterdam, between June and July. In 1906 and 1912 Georges Darien would run for the legislative elections as "candidate of the Single Tax", inspired by the ideas of Henry George.

Admired by Alfred Jarry, Alphonse Allais and years later by André Breton, Darien would be rediscovered in 1955, years after his death. He died on 19 August 1921 in Paris. His most important work is Le Voleur, published posthumously and taken to the big screen by Louis Malle in 1967.

== Works ==
=== Books ===
- Bas les cœurs! (1889)
- Biribi, discipline militaire (1890)
- Les Pharisiens (1891)
- Le Voleur (1897)
- La Belle France (1898)
- L'Epaulette (1901)
- Gottlieb Krumm (1904) (in English)

=== Plays ===
- Les Chapons, with Lucien Descaves (1890)
- L'Ami de l'ordre (1898)
- Le Parvenu (1906)
- Le Pain du Bon Dieu (1907)
- La Viande à Feu (1907)
- La Faute Obligatoire (1907)
- Non! Elle n'est pas coupable ! (1909)
- Les Mots sur les murs (1910)
- Les Murs de Jéricho (1910)
- Les Galériennes (1910)
