= Jehan Rictus =

French poet

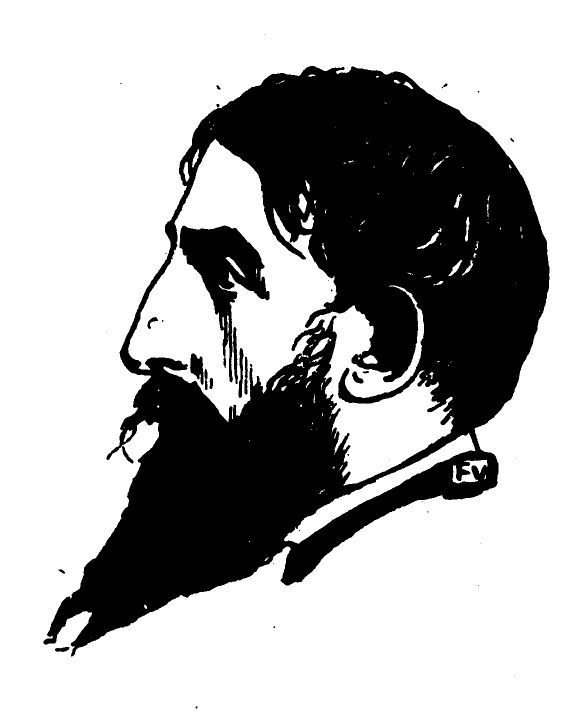
Portrait of Jehan Rictus by Félix Vallotton

Jehan Rictus (21 September 1867 – 6 November 1933) was a French poet. He was born Gabriel Randon in Boulogne-sur-Mer. In the 1900s, he legally changed his name to his mother's name Randon de Saint-Amand.

After an unhappy childhood and poor beginnings in the life, Gabriel Randon took the pseudonym of Jehan Rictus. He found success in 1895 with poems that gave voice to the destitute and deplorable of the Montmartre, which he recited in Parisian cabarets. These poems that Rictus interpreted, called Soliloques du Pauvre (Soliloquies of the Poor), were published in 1897. A few other volumes of verse followed, with Le Coeur populaire being published in 1914. At the time of World War I, he stopped publishing. He also forsook his anarchism for nationalist opinions. He is also the author of an autobiographical novel, Fil de fer, and of a vast diary. The first five booklets were published in 2005.

== Works ==
- Les Soliloques du Pauvre (1897)
- Doléances (1900)
- Les Cantilènes du malheur (1902)
- Les Soliloques du Pauvre (1903)
- Fil de Fer (1906)
- Le Coeur populaire (1914)

== Literatur ==
- Gaston Ferdière: Jehan-Rictus : son œuvre; portrait et autographe; document pour l'histoire de la littérature française, Paris : Éd. de la Nouv. Révue Critique, 1935
- René Martineau: Quelques aspects de Jehan Rictus, Paris : Messein, 1935
- Eugène Porret et Etienne Chipier: Jehan-Rictus et la misère, Couvet (Neuchâtel) : Éditions de la Roulotte, 1947
- Théophile Briant: Jehan Rictus : avec un choix de textes, une bibliographie, des illustrations, Paris : Seghers, 1973
- Philippe Oriol: Jehan-Rictus : la vraie vie du poète, Dijon : Éd. Univ. de Dijon, 2015, ISBN 978-2-36441-122-7
