= Benoît Broutchoux =

French anarchist (1879–1944)

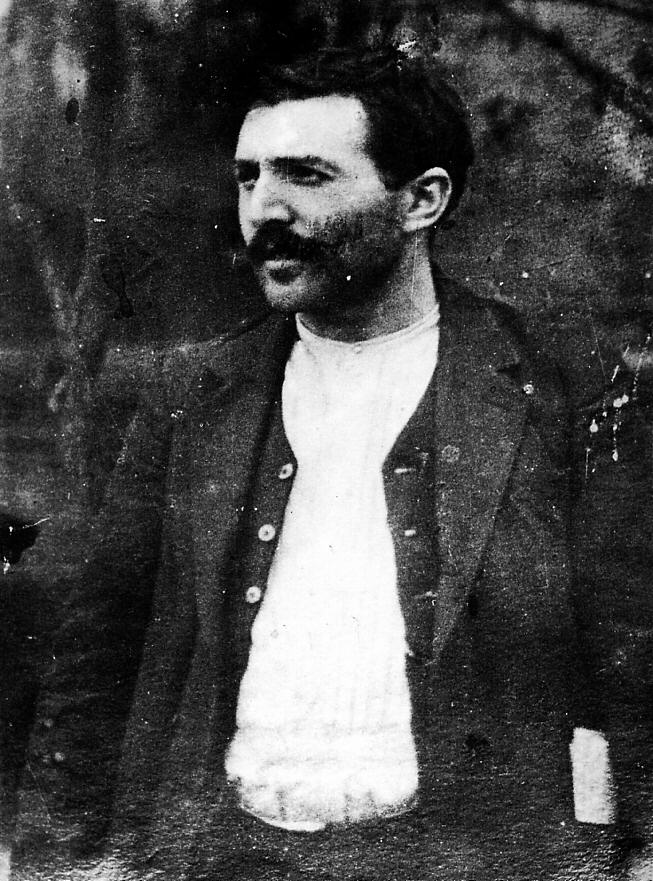
- Born: November 7, 1879; Essertenne, French Third Republic
- Died: June 2, 1944 (aged 64); Villeneuve-sur-Lot, Vichy France
- Other names: Benedict
- Organization: CGT
- Movement: Anarcho-syndicalism
- Opponent: Émile Basly
- Spouse: Fernande Marie Anna Richir

Benedict Broutchoux (7 November 1879 – 2 June 1944) was a French anarchist opposed to the reformist Émile Basly during a strike in the north of France, in 1902.
