= Gustave Hervé =

French politician

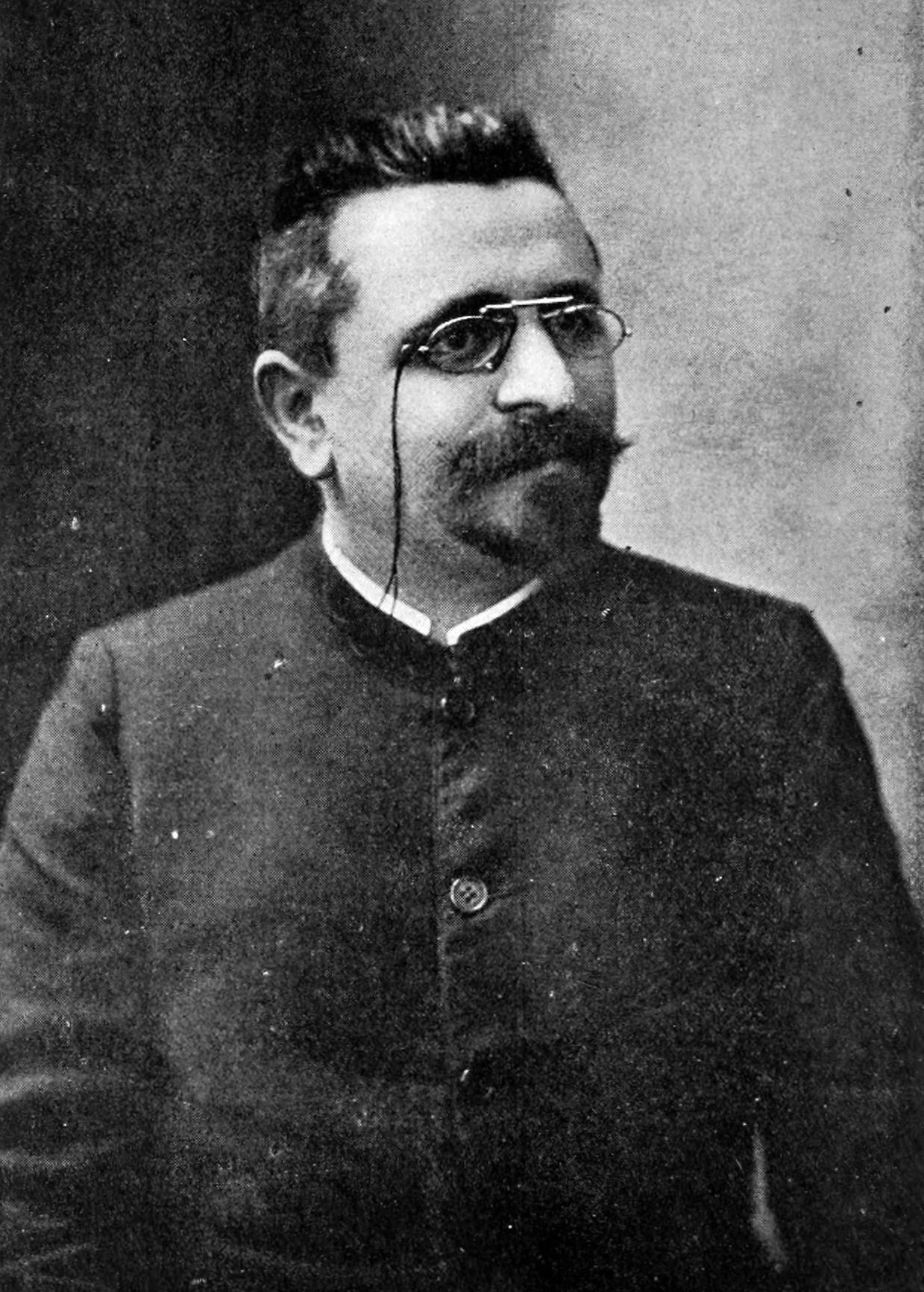
Gustave Hervé

Gustave Hervé (French pronunciation: [ɡystav ɛʁve]; Brest, January 2, 1871 – Paris, October 25, 1944) was a French politician. At first, he was a fervent antimilitarist socialist and pacifist, but he later turned to equally zealous ultranationalism, declaring his patriotisme in 1912 when released from 26 months of imprisonment for anti-militarist publishing activities.

== Career ==
In 1901 Gustave Hervé had attained notoriety with an apparent image of the tricolor planted in a dungpile. Soon he forged a prominent antimilitarist movement called Hervéism. When France's socialist parties united in 1905, Hervé led the most extreme faction. Soon Hervéists created a weekly newspaper, La Guerre sociale, which attempted to unite the extreme French left. Before World War I Hervé was one of the most strident voices within both French socialism and the Second International, advocating violent, revolutionary means to prevent war. Six years of sensational and provocative campaigns and organizations failed to implement his ideas. Despite his dedication, Hervé grew frustrated due to continuing leftist divisions. His disillusionment was connected to his views of certain revolutionary traditions. By 1914, he rallied to 'la patrie en danger' ('the fatherland in danger') and in 1916 changed the name of his paper to La Victoire.

In 1919, Hervé and several prominent socialists created the Parti socialiste national (PSN), which promoted "class co-operation" and solidarity. This "national socialism" of Hervé held significant overlap with Italian fascism, and when Benito Mussolini took power in Italy in the March on Rome, Hervé heralded him as "my courageous Italian comrade".

Startling as his reversal may appear at first glance, Hervé's activist Insurrectional Socialism actually included an antimaterialistic critique of society. That critique was crucial to his evolving national socialism which looked to the nation and its religious traditions to remedy social divisions and decadence. His rechristened newspaper and its associated groups offered various authoritarian panaceas to end French disorder. Despite Hervé's marginalization during the interwar era and his general reluctance to engage in violence, his Neo-Bonapartist views and admiration for Mussolini must inescapably be included within what Philippe Burrin has called "the fascist drift".

The PSN would never attract many supporters, so Hervé attempted to resurrect the party in 1925 as the Parti de la République autoritaire. In 1927, the name reverted to the Parti socialiste national. When Marcel Bucard became involved with the magazine La Victoire, it was renamed once again to La Milice socialiste in 1932.

Later in 1936, Hervé rallied behind French war hero Marshal Philippe Pétain, but distanced himself from him in 1940. He died in 1944, and was actually harassed during the war years by Vichy France officials for his criticism published in La Victoire.

The Italian-born soprano Herva Nelli was named after Gustave Hervé.

== In popular culture ==
Hervé is mentioned in Robert Hugh Benson's dystopian novel Lord of the World. Published in 1907, Benson's novel depicts a future history in which Hervé played a key role in a pan-European socialist revolution beginning at the fictional "Labour Parliament of 1917": "There had been Socialists before, but none like Gustave Herve [sic] in his old age—at least no one of the same power."
