= Alice Jouenne =

French educator and socialist activist

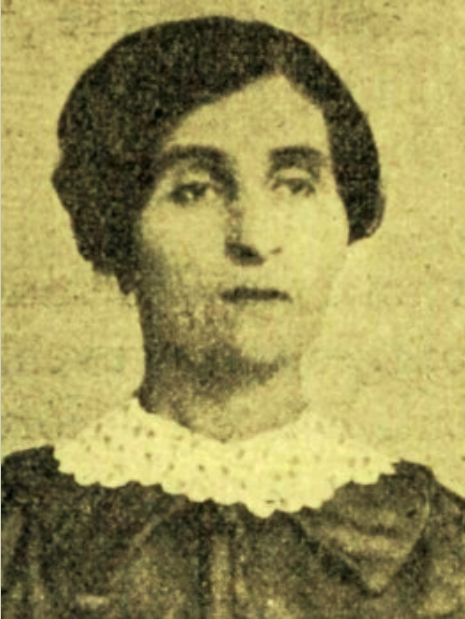
- Born: Alice Stein; 14 August 1873; Chamagne Vosges, France
- Died: 10 January 1954 (aged 80); Paris, France
- Occupations: educator; socialist activist; pacifist; feminist
- Known for: Co-founder, Éducation nouvelle en France (New Education in France); chef de Cabinet for Suzanne Lacore in Léon Blum's first government

Alice Jouenne (née Stein; 14 August 1873 – 10 January 1954) was a French educator and socialist activist. During the interwar period, Jouenne focused on education, pacifism, and feminism. She was one of the founders of Éducation nouvelle en France (New Education in France).

== Early life and education ==
Alice Stein was born in Chamagne (Vosges) on 14 August 1873. Of Alsatian origin, her parents fled the German occupation after the Franco-Prussian War which saw Alsace come under German rule.

Jouenne trained as a teacher at the École Normale in Nancy, graduating in 1890.

== Career ==
Her first appointment to a teaching position was in Badonviller where she worked for several years before moving to a private Parisian institution.

In 1904, she married Victor Jouenne, a socialist and cooperator who introduced her to his ideas. This led to her joining the cooperative "La Prolétarienne" in the 5th arrondissement.

=== Early activisism ===
In 1911, while a member of the Ligue des femmes coopératrices (League of Women Cooperators), Jouenne published the pamphlet Les Femmes et la coopération (Women and Cooperation). The following year, she became secretary of the education committee of the new Fédération nationale des coopératives de consommateurs (National Federation of Consumer Cooperatives).

On 25 May 1913, with the support of the General Confederation of Labour (CGT) and the Fédération communiste anarchiste (FCA) (Anarchist Communist Federation), Jean Jaurès' French Section of the Workers' International (SFIO) organized a pacifist demonstration against the Loi des Trois ans (Three Year Law). Three women made speeches at the event: Jouenne, Louise Saumoneau and Maria Vérone.

That year, Jouenne helped to establish the children's newspaper, Les Petits Bonshommes, becoming a contributor.

In January 1913, Louise Saumoneau, Marianne Rauze, Élisabeth Renaud, Jouenne and others founded the Socialist Women's Group (Groupe des Femmes Socialistes, GDFS) for women within the SFIO. Jouenne was in the GDFS for ten years, during which time she joined Freemasonry's Le Droit Humain.

Jouenne contributed to the redesign of La Voix des femmes, the first issue of which came out on 18 October 1919 and included articles by Marthe Bigot, Louise Bodin, Annette Charreau, Fanny Clar, Magdeleine Marx, Marianne Rauze, Henriette Sauret, Monette Thomas, as well as herself. She was also a journalist for L'Humanité and secretary to Marcel Cachin, director of the newspaper, until 1920 when she did not follow him in his change of direction linked to the Third International.

=== Interwar period ===
During the interwar period, Jouenne's attention was focused on education, pacifism, and feminism, in line with the trends of the times. In 1921, she founded the École municipale de plein air de Paris (Municipal Outdoor School of Paris) with Antoine-Frédéric Brunet, a member of the Conseil municipal de Paris (Paris City Council). She wrote a book about the outdoor school.

She joined the Ligue internationale pour l'éducation nouvelle (International League for New Education) (LIEN) movement, and wrote articles in the league's journal where she was presented as principal of the Municipal Outdoor School of Paris and founder of the New Education group. Chaired by Georges Renard, the group was established on 16 February 1922 and became known as Groupe français d'éducation nouvelle (French New Education Group) (GFEN).

In May 1929, Albert Thomas created the "Comité des Loisirs" (Leisure Committee) in which Jouenne was involved.

Jouenne retired in 1933 and left her school. Three years later, Suzanne Lacore appointed Jouenne as her Chef de Cabinet in her position as Undersecretary of State for Children in Léon Blum's first regime.

== Death ==
Alice Jouenne died in Paris on 10 January 1954.

== Selected works ==
- La Femme et la Coopération, 1911
- Les Appels du coeur chez l'institutrice, 1925
- Les idées de Madame Fleury, 1926
- Une expérience d’éducation nouvelle, l’école de plein air, 1927
- L'enfance et la coopération, 1929
