= Victor Méric =

French writer (1876–1933)

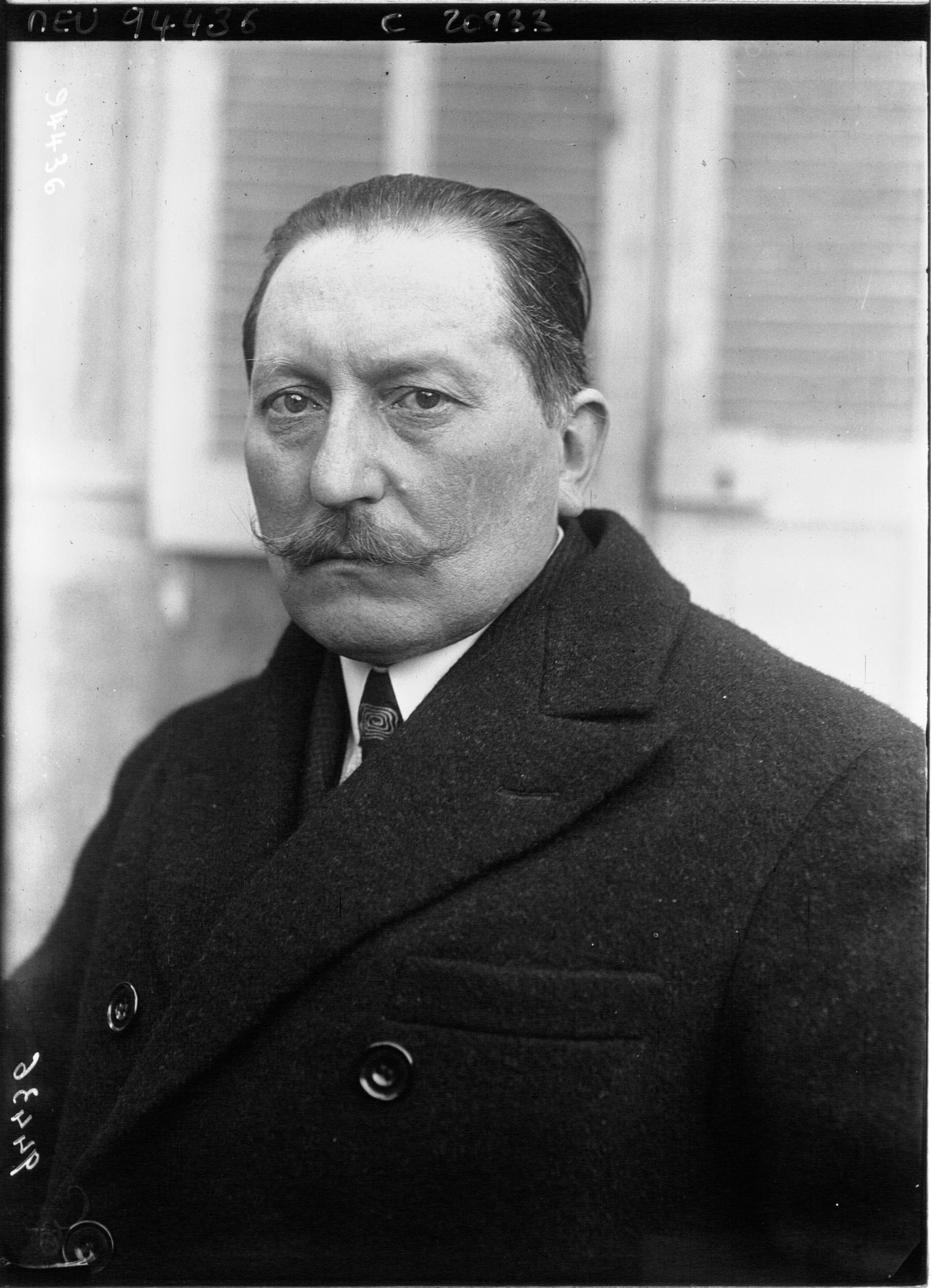
- Victor Méric c. 1921
- Born: 10 May 1876; Marseille, France
- Died: 10 October 1933 (aged 57); Paris, France
- Other name: Henri Coudon
- Occupations: Journalist, author

Victor Célestin Méric was the pseudonym of Henri Coudon (10 May 1876 – 10 October 1933), a French journalist and libertarian author. He contributed to various anarchist journals before World War I (1914–1918). Despite being a pacifist, he served in the army during the war. Afterwards, he joined the French Communist Party, but was expelled in 1923 for his pacifist convictions. He wrote several books, both fiction and non-fiction, and founded the Ligue internationale des combattants de la paix (LICP: International League of Fighters for Peace).

== Life ==
Henri Coudon was born in Marseille on 10 May 1876 into a progressive-minded family. He moved to Paris, where he joined anarchist circles and took the pseudonym Victor Méric. He contributed to Le Libertaire, where he became a friend of Gaston Couté and Fernand Desprès. He was one of the founders of the Association internationale antimilitariste in 1904.

In 1906, Méric joined the revolutionary socialists and contributed to Gustave Hervé's journal La Guerre Sociale. In 1907, Méric and Henri Fabre created the periodical Les Hommes du jour, illustrated by Aristide Delannoy, which was a great success. They were convicted twice for "insulting the army" and spent one year in prison, where Delannoy died. From 4 June 1910, Méric published the periodical La Barricade. With the outbreak of World War I (1914–18), despite being pacifist he was mobilized and sent to the front line for four years.

Victor Méric was one of the contributors to La Voix des femmes, founded in 1917 by Louise Bodin and Colette Reynaud. Others included Séverine, Marthe Bigot, Hélène Brion, Madeleine Pelletier, Magdeleine Marx, Romain Rolland, Henri Barbusse, Léon Werth, Georges Pioch, Georges Yvetôt and Marianne Rauze. The journal covered a broad range of opinions, with a radical left-leaning outlook. It demanded full sexual equality and emancipation.

After the war, Méric was enthusiastic about the Russian Revolution. In 1920, he joined the French Communist Party (PCF) and was elected to the steering committee of L'Humanité. Just after the end of the Tours Congress of 25–30 December 1920, pacifist intellectuals including Méric, Georges Pioch and others took a position of opposition to all war, including war for the defense of socialism. From 1921, he was opposed to the discipline of the Bolsheviks. In 1923, Méric was expelled from the PCF. Méric then participated in the Union socialiste communiste (USC: Socialist-Communist Union). In 1931, he launched the pacifist newspaper La Patrie Humaine and created the Ligue internationale des combattants de la paix (LICP: International League of Fighters for Peace).

Victor Méric died of cancer in Paris on 10 October 1933. He was cremated on 13 October 1933 in the Père Lachaise Cemetery in Paris.

== Work ==
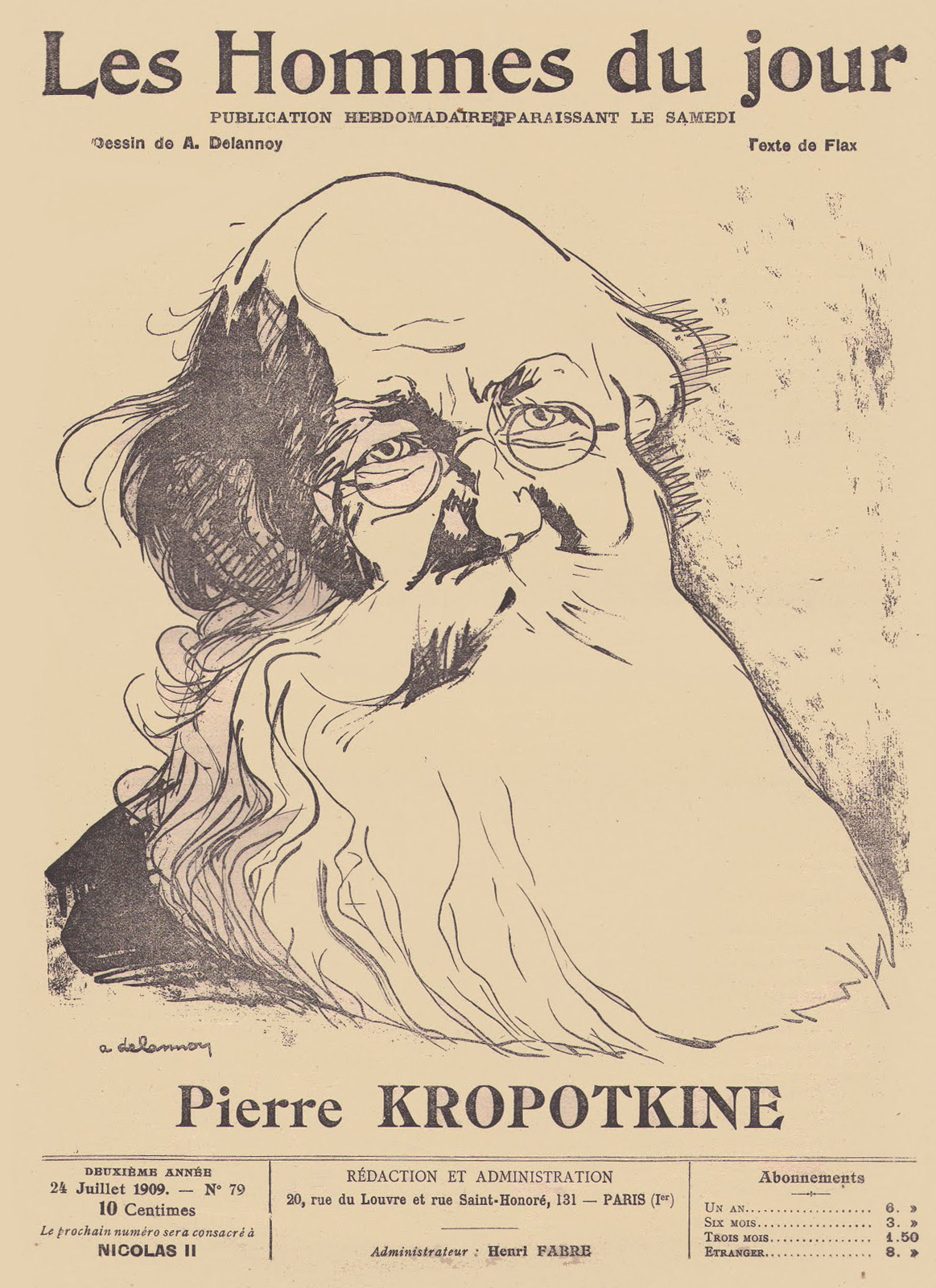
Cover of Les Hommes du jour showing Peter Kropotkin

Victor Méric contributed many articles to journals including Le Libertaire, La Guerre Sociale, Les Hommes du jour, La Barricade, La Voix des femmes, L'Humanité, La Patrie Humaine and others. He published several books, including:

- Le Bétail : pièce antimilitariste en un acte (The Beasts: Anti-militarist piece in one act), with Charles Malato, publications de l’Association internationale antimilitariste.
- Opinions subversives de M. Clemenceau, chef du gouvernement (Subversive Opinions of Mr. Clemenceau, Head of Government), Éditions de la Guerre sociale.
- Lettre à un conscrit (Letter to a conscript ), publications de l’Association internationale antimilitariste, 1904.
- Le Problème sexuel : libre maternité, fécondité, dépopulation (The Sexual Problem: free motherhood, fertility, depopulation), Éditions Génération consciente, 1909.
- Émile Zola, 1909
- Comment on fera la révolution (How the revolution will be made), Petite bibliothèque des Hommes du jour, 1910.
- À propos de la révolution qui vient (On the Coming Revolution), 1921
- Le Crime des Vieux (The Crime of the Old), novel, Éditions de France.
- La "Der des Der"" (The Der of the Der), novel, Éditions de France.
- Trois Hommes dans la Révolution (Marat, Camille Desmoulins, Babeuf) (Three Men in the Revolution (Marat, Camille Desmoulins, Babeuf))
- Quatre d'infanterie : front ouest, 1918 (Four infantrymen: Western Front in 1918), from German novel Vier von der Infanterie by Ernst Johannsen, translated with Émile Storz, Éditions de l'Épi, 1929.
- Les Bandits tragiques (The Tragic Bandits), Simon Kra editor, 1926
- Les Compagnons de l'Escopette : roman de sac et de corde (The Companions of Escopette: novel of the gallows), Éditions de l'Épi, 1930.
- Jean-Paul Marat, 1930
- À travers la jungle politique et littéraire (Through the political and literary jungle), 1930/1931.
- La Guerre qui revient : fraîche et gazeuse (The War returns: fresh and gassy) Éditions Sirius, 1932.

== Sources ==
- Accampo, Elinor (2010-09-01). Blessed Motherhood, Bitter Fruit: Nelly Roussel and the Politics of Female Pain in Third Republic France. JHU Press. ISBN 978-0-8018-8896-0.
- Faivre-Zellner, Catherine (2014). "Georges Pioch".
- "Victor Méric (1876-1933)". Estel Negre Ateneu Llibertari (in Catalan).
- "Victor Méric (1876-1933): pseudonyme individuel". BnF.
