= Feminism and media =

Use of media by feminist movements

The socio-political movements and ideologies of feminism have found expression in various media. These media include newspaper, literature, radio, television, social media, film, and video games. They have been essential to the success of many feminist movements.

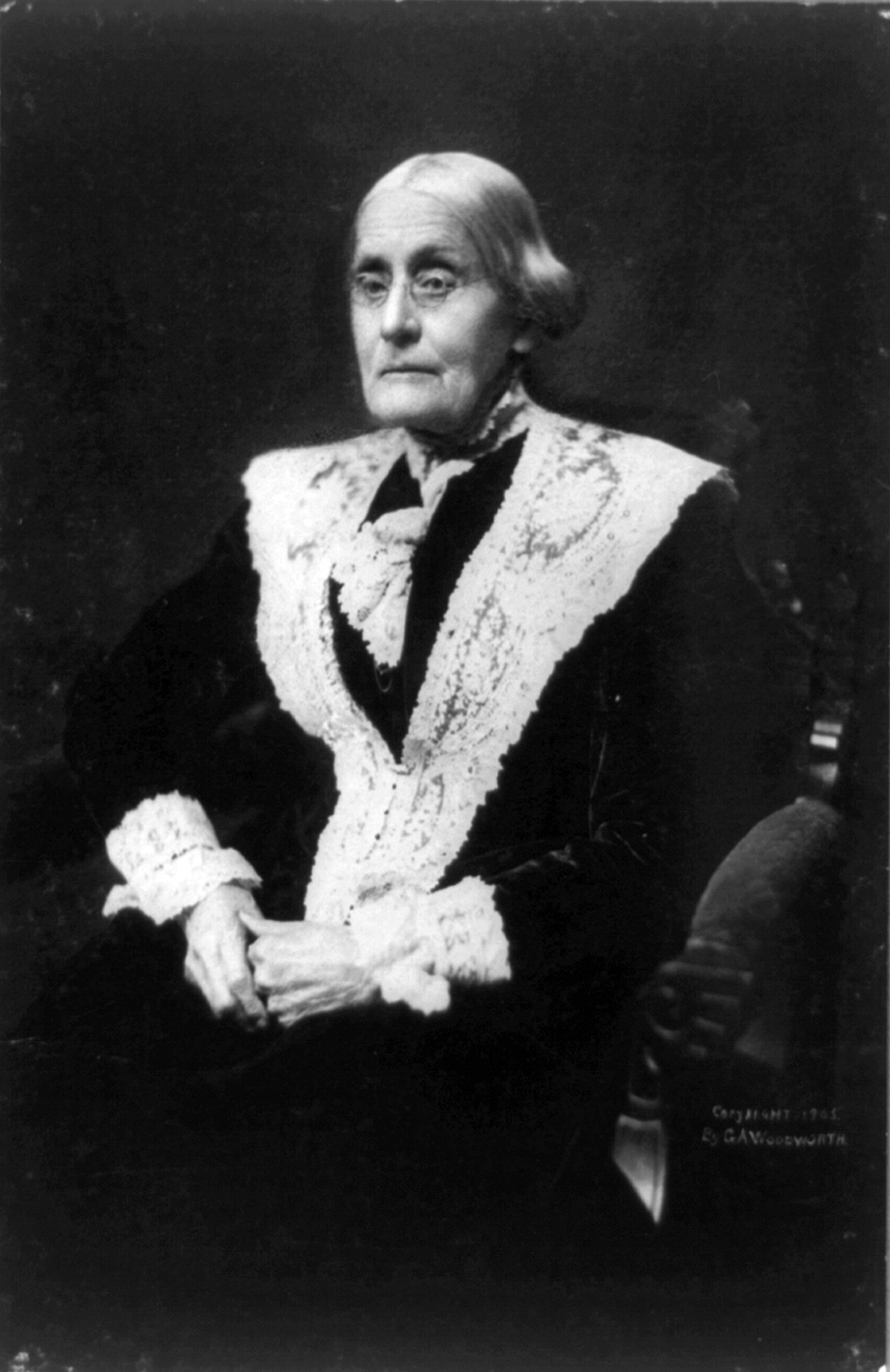
Susan B. Anthony, one of the authors of The Revolution

== History ==
The history of feminism dates back to the 19th century and continues through present day. Feminism can be broken down into three distinct sections: first-wave, second-wave, and third-wave.

The terms "suffragette" and "feminist" refer to different movements, particularly in the early 1900s. Suffragists aimed to make it possible for women to vote in elections, but reinforced the notion that women should remain domestic (caring for the home, family, and community). Feminists, on the other hand, not only supported suffrage, but also were advocates for women to be entitled to the "same level of participation, economic independence, and social and sexual freedoms as men" (Finn, 2012).

=== First-wave feminism ===
First-wave feminism refers to the feminist movement of the 19th and early 20th century. At this time, women had little control over their lives. Generally, they were housewives who were uneducated and possessed no property or economic rights. Their lives were overwhelmingly limited creating discontent in the context of being limited to roles such as motherhood or wife-hood.

Feminists of the time (mostly middle-class white women) focused on the legal disabilities of women, especially women's suffrage. The first wave began at the Seneca Falls Convention of 1848, in which Elizabeth Cady Stanton drafted the Seneca Falls Declaration. The Declaration outlined the feminist's political strategies and philosophies. Suffragists worked together to attract more women to their cause, they went against traditional methods such as propaganda and lobbying that were previously learned during Radical Reconstruction and the abolitionist movements.

The first-wave was fueled by The Second Great Awakening, which allowed women to have more leadership roles in society, and the abolition and temperance movements. Women were generally excluded from these movements, prompting suffragists to demand women's suffrage. However, not all suffragists considered themselves feminists; they were eager for the right to vote, but not in favor of gender equality. Suffragists and feminists had their first success when New York passed the Married Women's Property Act in 1860, which legalized property ownership for women. They also had success when Congress ratified the 19th Amendment in 1920, allowing women the right to vote.

==== First-wave feminism use of media ====
The feminists' message during first-wave feminism was primarily spread through newspaper and other printed media such as pamphlets and bulletins.

=== Second-wave feminism ===
Feminists attempted to draw attention by forming women-only organizations, such as the National Organization for Women (NOW), and publishing papers that advocated women's equality, such as "The BITCH Manifesto". Radical feminists promoted the idea that "gender is an absolute rather than a relative category". An early depiction of this view includes Valerie Solanas's, S.C.U.M Manifesto written in 1967. The major legislative focus of the wave was on the passage of the Equal Rights Amendment (ERA), which guaranteed social equality regardless of sex. The ERA made it to Congress for ratification, but failed to be ratified. The second-wave is said to have ended in the early 1980s with the discussion of sexuality and pornography, issues that were discussed during the third wave. With more advanced technology in the second wave, feminists used newspapers, television, radio, and published papers to spread their message.

Prior to 1960, both men and women accepted the reality of traditional gender and family roles. But, when the second-wave feminism began, women challenged these roles both at home and at work. (Beck, 1998). Betty Friedan's 1963 book, The Feminine Mystique, has been said to have spurred the second-wave movement due to its discussion of the unhappiness of (white, middle-class) women "with their limited gender roles and their sense of isolation in the suburban nuclear family" (Mendes, 2011).

==== Second-wave feminism use of media ====
It was also during this period (around the 1960s and 1970s) that women's portrayal on television was changing, in part due to the eventual release of "female sexual and political energy" (Douglas, 1994). Before this time, women's sexuality could be considered a "taboo" topic, creating for a revolutionary change in the portrayal of women on television. Examples of these different female roles include but are not limited to: Morticia Addams (The Addams Family), Samantha Stevens (Bewitched), and Mary Richards (The Mary Tyler Moore Show). All of the aforementioned women were either magical in some way and/or a strong female character, which differed from the more stereotypical-housewife roles from the 1950s. In addition, many roles in this era portrayed the woman as independent, thus not needing or seeking out a man.

=== Third-wave feminism ===
Third-wave feminism started beginning in the early 1990s and continues into the present. This movement grew as a response of the supposed failures and criticism of the second-wave movement. The goals of the movement were broadened from the second wave to focus on ideas such as lesbian theory, abolishing gender roles and stereotypes, and defending sex work, pornography, and sex-positivity. The movement has a focus on lesbian and African American women as distinct from traditional feminists, and it has weakened many traditional concepts, such as those notions of gender, heteronormativity, and "universal womanhood". This conversation on social media on womanhood has strengthened the understanding of the "economy of the celebrity". (Keller)

==== Third-wave feminism use of media ====
Third-wave feminism depends mostly on social media to spread its goals. Social media outlets such as Twitter and Facebook are consistently covered in feminist messages, and hashtag campaigns are steadily spread to convey feminist ideas (#heforshe, #yesallwomen, #whyistayed). Many television shows also feature dominant, strong women and encourage the idea that women are equal to men (Nashville, Orange Is the New Black, and Buffy the Vampire Slayer).

Press (2011) wrote that third-wave feminism focuses more on women's sexual freedom, which has come a long way since the time of second-wave feminism. Disparities such as the "orgasm gap" still exist (Armstrong, England & Fogarty, 2010), which describes the sexual inequalities between men and women involving sexual gratification. The media also continues to oppose the existence of women's sexual freedom, noted with the continued use of the word "slut" as well as the emphasized importance of virginity, which is often displayed in popular culture.

== Mass media ==
Though most journalists aim to create an objective view of their subjects, feminism has long been portrayed in a negative light. Feminism's portrayal is fueled by the idea that the media seems to lean toward opposition; pinning women again men creates the mostly negative roles women become portrayed by. A study by Lind and Saio (2006) revealed that feminists rarely appear in the media and are often demonized. They are often portrayed as different from "regular" women, and are not associated with day-to-day activities, but rather, public activities and events. Feminists are also not often portrayed as victims and are more frequently associated with the women's movement and their goals compared to regular women (meaning if a woman isn't a labeled "feminist" she often isn't associated with the movement, despite being female). Creedon (1993) wrote, "feminists are constantly framed as deviant sexually, a bunch of man-haters out to destroy 'family values.'" In the media, the term "feminism" is often opposed to the term "family", leading to the idea that feminists can't be family women. This negative portrayal over the decades has led many young women rejecting the idea of feminism, in part due to feminists being labeled as "man bashers". Other labels associated with feminism include: "bubblehead", "Amazons", "angries", "radical", and "hairy" (Jones, 1992). Most media decision-makers are male, although women are beginning to enter the field of journalism. The contemporary women's movement has predominantly been ignored through mainstream media, leaving only room for a few high-profile exceptions. The Miss America pageant of 1968 was one of the first high-profile cases to be publicized. Although to the feminist movement's dismay, the coverage was both distorted and sensationalized. During the occurrence of the event, the term "bra-burner" label for women unearthed itself. The practice of labeling feminists with derogatory terms has been a method to silence its supporters and promote fear of speaking out.

Flora Davis (1991) wrote in her book, Moving the Mountain: The Women's Movement in America, that the media coverage on the feminist movement wasn't necessarily negative, as it was the media that spotlighted the movement in 1969. In addition, Davis notes that the media is the source that publicized the movement's issues, heroines, and activities and allowed the movement to reach individuals it may have not otherwise.

== Intersectionality in media ==
A key framework in feminist media studies is intersectionality, it examines how overlapping social identities like race, gender, class, sexuality, and ability. These identities shape representation and audience experience. This concept is introduced by Kimberlé Crenshaw in 1989 which explained how systems of oppression overlap and build unique forms of discrimination which are far from complex.

Within media studies, intersectionality challenges the inclination to label women and group them as homogenous. Instead, it portrays and highlights that media representations are molded by interlocking identities. Gender is not the only thing that impacts and influences gender, but race, class, or sexuality influence how they are socially constructed and perceived.

== On screen media ==
=== Social media ===
In recent years, social media platforms like Twitter and Facebook have led to widespread discussion on issues ranging from domestic abuse to street harassment, catcalling, and abortion. In 2012, feminists in Turkey created Facebook groups to organize and mobilize protests and marches against legislation of a nationwide abortion ban. Feminists in other parts of the European Union began to take notice and promoted the issue in their respective Facebook groups and the legislation was eventually dropped from the legislative agenda.

In the wake of the Ray Rice domestic abuse scandal, in which video evidence showed the Baltimore Ravens running back knocking his then fiancée, Janay Palmer, unconscious, writer Beverly Gooden started the Twitter hashtag #WhyIStayed. This hashtag highlighted personal experiences of herself and other women who stayed in abusive relationships. This quickly spawned subsequent hashtags including #WhyILeft which many used to describe the final incident of abuse or reason for leaving.

==== Feminist use of Twitter ====
In 2013, the Representation Project created a mobile app called #NotBuyingIt which allows users to connect with each other and quickly tweet or otherwise engage sexist media ranging from advertisements to soundbites and quotes from public figures. It is often used during football season where Super Bowl ads are notoriously deemed sexist. In the aftermath of the University of California-Santa Barbara shootings, thousands of women across the internet began tweeting experiences of sexism experienced in their daily lives with the hashtag #YesAllWomen. In June 2014, as a response to the US Supreme court's decision in Burwell v. Hobby Lobby, there were thousands of tweets containing #HobbyLobby, #JoinTheDissent and #NotMyBossBusiness expressing emotions ranging from disdain to rage at the Supreme Court's decision to allow employers not to cover certain contraceptives on a religious basis. According to Matthew Slutsky at Change.org, social media has opened the forums on these issues to not only feminists and other activists, but to anyone who wants to discuss them.

==== #MeToo movement ====
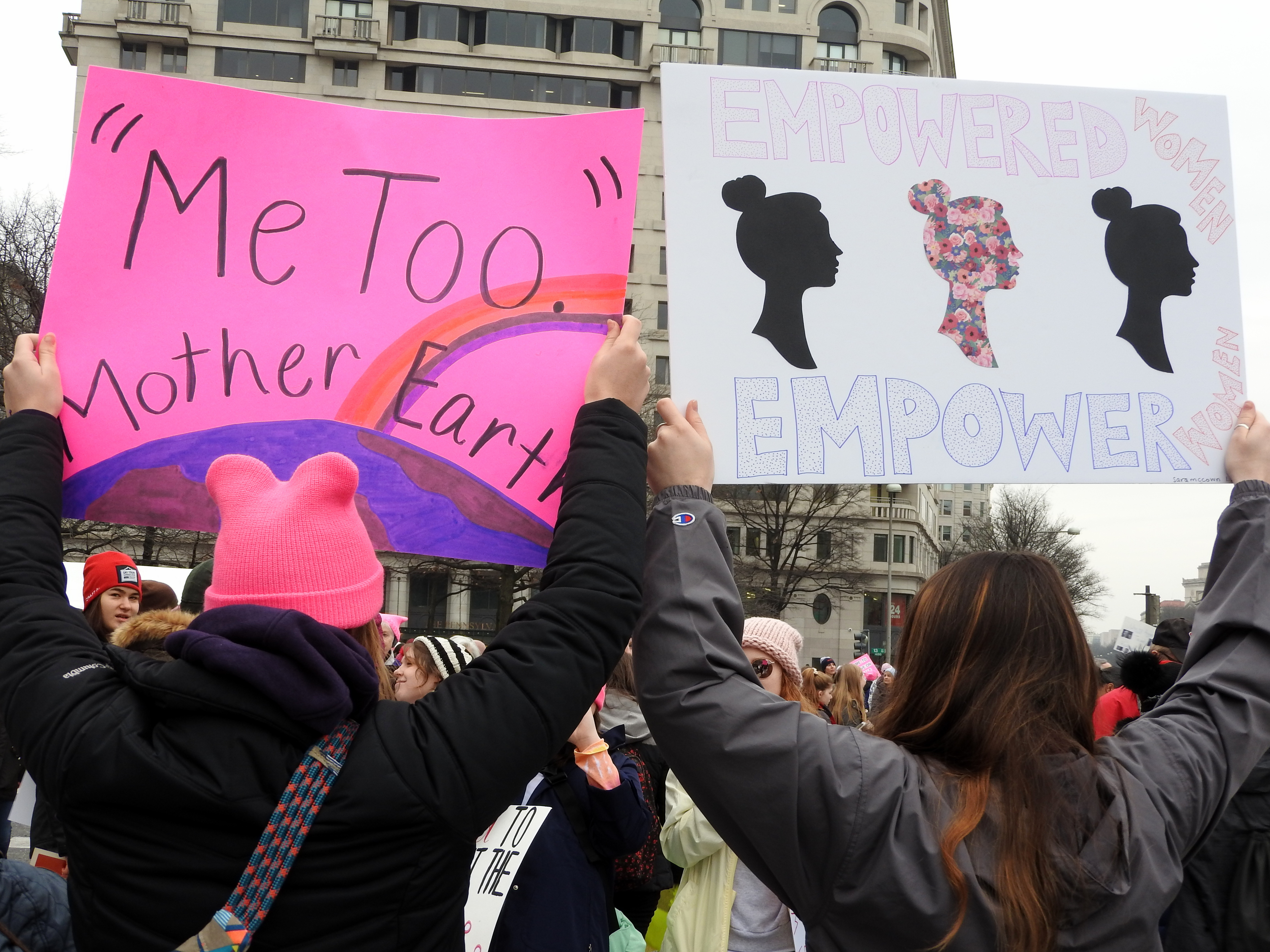
Sign from the 2019 Women's March supporting the #MeToo movement.

In 2017, actress Alyssa Milano brought the #MeToo movement to light when she asked her Twitter followers to reply with #metoo if they had experienced sexual assault. While Milano's actions have received backlash for taking credit for a movement that was started by an African American women the movement has stood to expose sexual harassment and assault within the work place. Following the social media popularity it was reported that 30% of women and 4% of men reported experiencing sexual assault within the U.S. academic medical field. While Milano brought popularity to the movement following allegations against Harvey Weinstein she did not create the movement or the phrase. Activist Tarana Burke originally started the movement in 2007. She started using the term "me too" to show solidarity with girls and women who had and were experiencing sexual assault. This movement reached all aspects of life in the United States including Hollywood, politics, education, news outlets, and even agriculture. The #MeToo movement has allowed not only a shift or norms but a shift in policies, education, and trainings in order to create better reporting systems and prevent sexual misconduct from occurring.

===== #WomenInMaleFields and Satirical Feminism =====
In the past decade, there has been a rise in feminist and queer satirical social media movements such as #MasculinitySoFragile. Created by sociology major Anthony Williams an effort to promote conversation about the violence and harassment that women face daily, it provided a platform for people to call out casual sexism and homophobia with a more humorous tone. In 2024, the trend #WomenInMaleFields began circulating social media platforms (primarily TikTok) with a similar intention. Typically, videos made in this format show a woman acting out a specific negative behavior she has experienced, such as "He was crying in bed so I said ‘here we go again’ and turned around and fell asleep #womeninmalefields". The trend has reached audiences globally, who express feeling grateful with the realization that they're not alone in experiencing double standards that extend beyond their own relationships, and shines a spotlight on the normalization of certain negative mindsets often associated with masculinity. These social media movements highlight the increase of satire based on the reversal of gender roles in online feminist circles, and showcase how feminism continues to adapt its voice to the modern audience. One study called this form of online satirical feminism "Reparative Tweeting", asserting that humor can be a performative resistance" and that “it is sometimes able to accomplish more in the public sphere than serious discourse alone". By providing women with a safe online space to infuse humor into their critiques, the #WomenInMaleFields trend provides a new and less-explored perspective on how feminism can take shape in subversive ways.

==== Emma Watson ====
In addition, celebrities such as Emma Watson have also taken a pro-feminist stance through social media. In 2014, the UN Women's Ambassador stated, "I am from Britain and think it is right that as a woman I am paid the same as my male counterparts. I think it is right that I should be able to make decisions about my own body. I think it is right that women be involved on my behalf in the policies and decision-making of my country. I think it is right that socially I am afforded the same respect as men. But sadly I can say that there is no one country in the world where all women can expect to receive these rights." Her speech also goes into depth about the negative connotation the word feminist has because of social media and how we as a society can take a stand for gender equality.

Studies into political campaigning have proven that women tweet more aggressively than their male counterparts, as platforms such as Twitter allow women to bypass traditional media and bring attention to their own raw narrative. In 2018 the use of feminist social media came to the forefront in the referendum to appeal the abortion laws in Ireland. Grassroots campaign groups, like TogetherForYes, strategized their social media to campaign and influence a positive "yes" vote to amend abortion laws. When tackling these feminist issues, social media can bring somewhat traditional private issues into the public, an exposure that can encourage positive change as emotions are mobilized across an online network, reaching people who can not only vote, but also those who can encourage voters, to support their women counterparts.

=== Film ===
Film is an aspect of media that contributes to the socialization of citizens. Feminist themes in film have become more commonplace within modern history and feminist film theory was born out of several disciplines of psychoanalysis conjoining with the emerging film industry and the views of sexuality and gender roles.

In her 1970 essay "Visual Pleasure and Narrative Cinema", Laura Mulvey diagnosed two major issues within Hollywood that she felt allowed for an inaccurate portrayal of the feminine experience up until that time. Her first claim, that "men and women are differentially positioned by cinema", states that women are positioned in roles as inferior or subservient to men. The lead roles or main action roles are normally held by men. She argued that this perpetuates the stereotypes that females are incapable and that males are dominating and the leaders of the group. The second claim is that women are portrayed in film as "objects for masculine desire and fetishistic gazing", writing that this relates directly to the sexuality of females and that the prevalence of a romantic element to a female's role shows that beyond a romantic or sexual element, women in the plot line are essentially worthless. Sophie Mayer's 2016 publication Political Animals: The New Feminist Cinema focuses on feminist film theory in the 21st century and argues that many of the same issues pointed out in Mulvey's essay continue. Mayer focuses instead on other elements of film beside plot to view through a feminist lens. She also looks at other cinematic elements such as costuming that expand the volume of works that can be reviewed with feminist film theory.

=== Video games ===
Video games have become a new form of media that derives from other media, such as books, films, and music. It is a new model that can interact with old forms of media and then create new contents or means of entertainment and interaction. With the development of video games, female characters play a significant role in the gaming world. However, most of the female characters are usually being objectified by video games. Especially, there are a large number of female characters who are objectified as sex workers in commercial video games. Yao et al. state that female heroines in action-based video games often wear sexy outfits barely covering their bodies. Moreover, Yao et al. also indicate that sexualized female characters may prime males' thoughts about sex and encourage them to view women as objects, fueling belief in negative female stereotypes. As a result, objectifying females has severely affected gender equality, and it also becomes a method that game companies use to attract male players. Through the development of video games, males have always been the main customers, so game companies do not intend to consider the feelings of female players. Bonnie Ruberg states that the reason for having discrimination against female characters is not because of the erotic labor but the devaluation behavior that presents in the games. Moreover, in her article "Representing sex workers in video games: feminisms, fantasies of exceptionalism, and the value of erotic labor", she criticizes the game's description and portrayal of female characters, and she also promotes that video games need a diversity of feminisms.

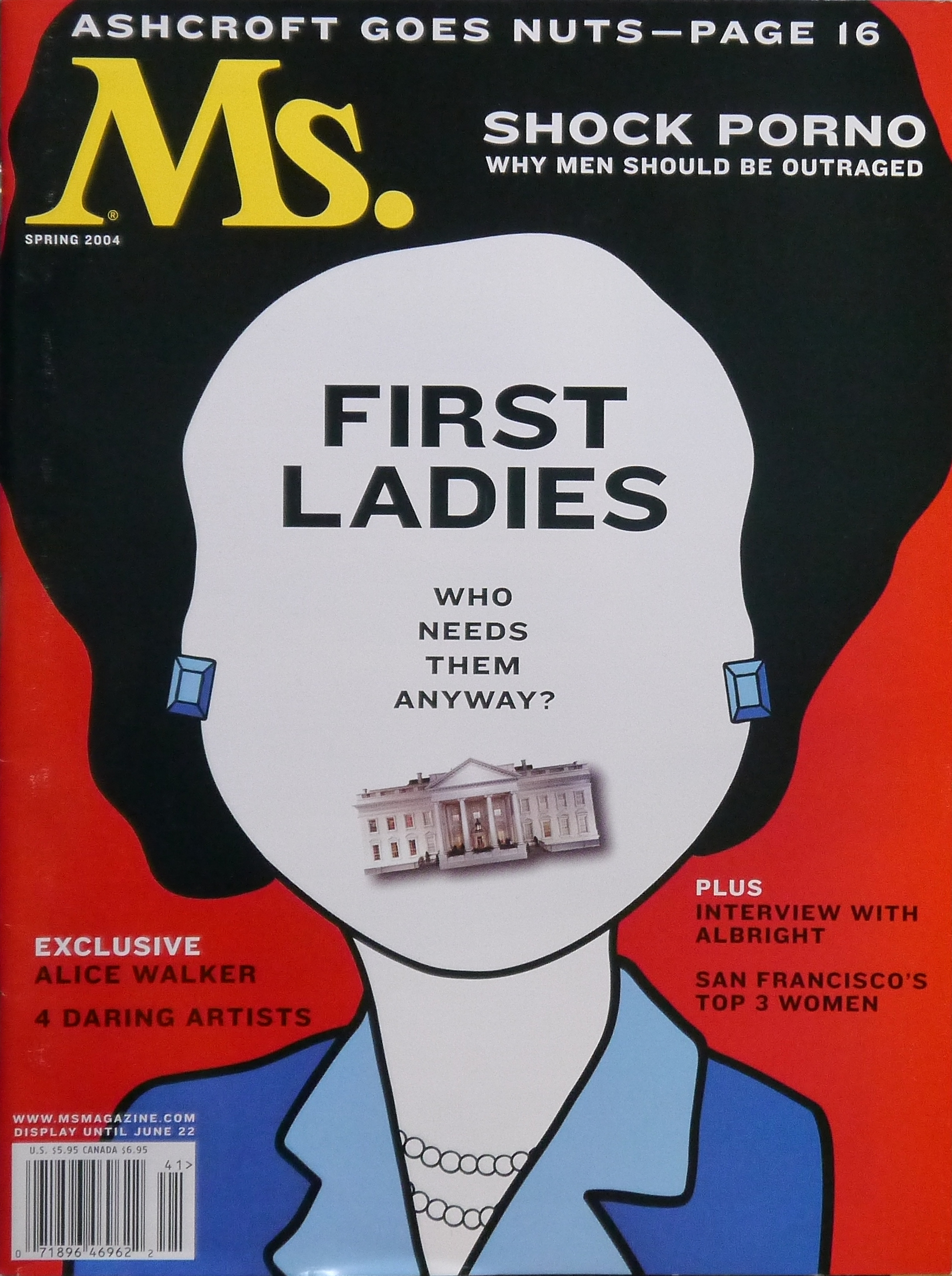
Ms. is a feminist focused magazine

== Print publications ==
Though hardcopy newspapers do not carry the readership they once did, they played a historically important role in the circulation of feminist ideas within Western societies. Newspapers were the dominant form of mass media throughout the 1800s and early 1900s, beginning to decline only after the proliferation of radio and television news. Feminist newspapers allowed women and their group interests to voice their opinion to a larger audience with more consistency and accuracy than word of mouth, helping lay the groundwork for organized movements to take hold. Throughout the 1800s, several feminist newspapers were started with varying degrees of success. The German feminist newspaper founded by Mathilde Franziska Anneke, Frauenzeitung, managed to produce a single issue. In contrast, Louise Otto-Peters's Frauen-Zeitung, a weekly German feminist newspaper, lasted from April 1849 to at least the middle of 1852. The readership and lifespan of feminist newspapers varies widely, but there are several examples that are known for their contributions to the cause of feminism through this form of mass media.

=== La Voix des Femmes ===
La Voix des Femmes (English: The Voice of Women) was founded by Eugénie Niboyet and remained in print from 1848 to 1852. It was the first French feminist daily newspaper and enjoyed great success. Its decline was due to the rise of conservatism under Napoleon III. In 1917, Colette Reynaud and Louise Bodin launched a weekly French feminist newspaper reusing the name, La Voix des femmes; it ceased publication in 1937.

=== La Fronde ===
La Fronde (English: The Sling) was another French feminist daily newspaper created by Marguerite Durand. It ran from 9 December 1897, to March 1905. It was run and written solely by women. It notably achieved a readership of 50,000 in Paris, before financial problems led to its closure.

=== Courage ===
A group of women from the Kreuzberg Women's Centre created the German feminist newspaper Courage in 1976. The paper published many articles on taboo subjects that were issues for feminists, such as abortion, sexual violence, and forced prostitution. The newspaper declared bankruptcy in 1984 because of the loss of readership due to negative coverage from male press and competing feminist papers.

=== The Revolution ===
The Revolution was an American weekly newspaper created by Susan B. Anthony and Elizabeth Cady Stanton as a reaction to the National Woman Suffrage Association's call to put women's suffrage on hold, to deal with the issue of African American male suffrage. The establishment of the newspaper in January 1868 helped keep the women's suffrage movement alive during the post-civil war era. However, Anthony's ideological commitments, including her opposition to "quack medicine" and "Restellism" (a reference to Madame Restell, a 19th-century British-born American abortionist), limited available income for the newspaper. Bankruptcy was declared in 1870, and Anthony shouldered the $10,000 debt.

=== Media Directory of Women Experts ===
The Independent Women's Forum published the Media Directory of Women Experts as a way of providing journalists with names of women that could give conservative opinions on topics.
