= Marianne Rauze =

French journalist, feminist, socialist, pacifist and communist

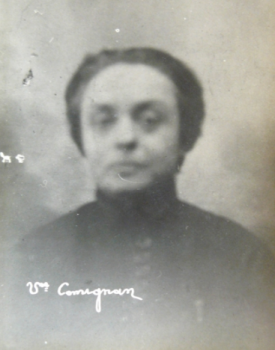
- Born: Marie Anne Rose Gaillarde; 20 September 1875; Paris, France
- Died: 23 October 1964 (aged 89); Perpignan, Pyrénées-Orientales, France
- Occupation: Journalist
- Known for: Activism

Marianne Rauze (20 September 1875 – 23 October 1964) was a French journalist, feminist, socialist, pacifist and communist.

== Life ==
=== Pre-war ===
Marie Anne Rose Gaillarde was born in Paris on 20 September 1875. She became Marie Anne Comignan by marriage. She became an activist in 1905. Marie Anne Rose's husband was a captain in the army. She took the pseudonym "Marianne Rauze", formed from her first names, to protect her husband's career.

The seamstress Louise Saumoneau, Élisabeth Renaud, and others founded the Feminist Socialist Group, which had 300 members by 1902. The Section Française de l'Internationale Ouvrière (SFIO: French Section of the Workers' International) was formed in 1905. It was male-dominated, and refused to allow Saumoneau's group to join as a group, although individual women could join the SFIO. At the end of December 1912, Rauze held a dinner at which the constitution of the feminine section of the SFIO was agreed. Madeleine Pelletier refused her invitation to this event, ostensibly because her stomach was very delicate, but probably because the young and beautiful Marianne Rauze was the type of woman that Pelletier detested. In January 1913 Rauze, Saumoneau, Renaud and others founded the Socialist Women's Group (Groupe des Femmes Socialistes, GDFS) for women within the SFIO. (Note: The GDFS broke up during the war, but was recreated in 1922. When the Comité National des Femmes Socialistes (CNDFS: National Committee of Socialist Women) was founded in 1931 the GDFS was dissolved.)

A debate at once began within the GDFS over the question of whether socialist women should ally with bourgeois feminists. Rauze argued against, saying working women would not be emancipated by the vote but by the economic independence that they would gain through the SFIO. If working women helped the suffragists get the vote, it would be used against them in the class struggle. Rauze did agree that, although caused by economic conditions, "masculine arbitrariness" was an oppressive force. By late 1913 Louise Saumoneau, who strongly believed the struggle should be based only on class, had defeated the feminists and controlled the GDFS.

Rauze founded the journal L’Équité in 1913, and contributed to many other journals. Around the end of 1913, Rauze's husband was transferred to Chartres. Marianne Rauze moved with him. She soon became pessimistic about the revolutionary potential of provincial women, and thought the GDFS should set up feminine groups to educate women in preparation for joining the SFIO. She visited Paris in February 1914 to argue for this change, but could not gain support from anyone but the sole remaining feminist on the GDFS executive, Marguerite Martin. Later that spring, Rauze offered to make L'Équité, now a successful bi-weekly, the official organ of the GDFS. Saumoneau refused the offer in favor of launching a new journal, and in July 1914 gained approval for starting a publication in September 1914. This did not in fact happen.

Rauze was a member of Le Droit Humain, a Freemason society, and twice talked on feminism to her "Diderot" lodge in the first half of 1914. In the run-up to the legislative elections of 1914 Rauze, Hélène Brion and Marguerite Martin left the moderate Union franchise pour le Suffrage des Femmes (UFSF) and formed the Ligue nationale pour le Vote des Femmes (National League for Women's Votes), a militant suffrage society. The league attracted socialist women who disagreed with Saumoneau's hostile stance against bourgeois feminism such as Judith Ducret-Metsu, elected president, and Fabienne Tisserand, elected secretary-general. It was also supported by feminists such as Marguerite Durand, Maria Vérone, Madeleine Pelletier, Séverine and Nelly Roussel. The league gained about 250 members. It would not accept the compromise of municipal suffrage, but demanded full voting rights equal to men.

=== World War I ===
During World War I (1914–18), L’Équité was subject to censorship, and could not print pacifist articles from authors such as Nelly Roussel. It ceased publication in 1916. Marianne Rauze was one of the contributors to La Voix des femmes, founded in 1917 by Louise Bodin and Colette Reynaud. Others included Séverine, Marthe Bigot, Hélène Brion, Madeleine Pelletier, Magdeleine Marx, Romain Rolland, Henri Barbusse, Léon Werth, Georges Pioch, Georges Yvetôt and Victor Méric. The journal covered a broad range of opinions, with a radical left-leaning outlook. It demanded full sexual equality and emancipation.

Rauze was widowed in November 1916 when her husband, Captain Léon Comignan, was killed by enemy fire at the Battle of the Somme, and remained a widow for the remainder of her life. In March 1917, Rauze's manifesto Aux féministes socialistes was published by the journal Demain. The introduction said that the manifesto had been censored in France. She said that women's ability to give life was outside the control of a state, and women would never recognise borders. Women denounced militarism and violence, and denounced the unchallenged discipline of the socialist parties, which led to disaster. Rauze founded a Ligue ouvrière féminine (League of female workers) in April 1918. In November 1918, when it was clear that the allies had won the war, Rauze began to argue that the time was near for a social revolution.

=== Inter-war years ===
Rauze voted for the Third International at the SFIO's 17th congress in Strasbourg in February 1920. A police report of August 1920 said that Rauze was telling workers in the munitions factories to stop production. In the spring of 1921 Rauze was lecturing at the Communist Party's "Communist Marxist School" near Paris, speaking on Engel's views about women. From 1919 to 1923, Marianne Rauze was a member of the central committee of the Republican Veterans Association (ARAC: Association républicaine des anciens combattants).

By 1923, Rauze had come to believe that the Red Army, instead of dissolving itself after defeating the Allied invasion of Russia, was turning into a permanent professional force. She became an extreme pacifist, forming a "union against death" that had almost mystical beliefs bordering on anarchism, mysticism and Esperanto. Romain Rolland told her that her thinking was "too exclusively (nearly exclusively) anti, that is negative." She returned to the socialism of the SFIO. From the 1930s, she lived in the Pyrénées-Orientales.

=== World War II and after ===
During World War II (1939–45), Rauze was a member of the Comité local de libération of Perpignan and the Comité départemental de libération of the Pyrénées-Orientales. From 1944 to 1945, she was a municipal councilor in Perpignan. In 1954, Marianne Rauze-Comignan published Pour la paix universelle (For Universal Peace) in which she said the feminine will must be collective, free of all male influence or authority. She was an activist in the Parti socialiste autonome (PSA) from 1958–60 and then the Parti Socialiste Unifié (PSU) from 1960–64. She died in Perpignan, Pyrénées-Orientales on 23 October 1964 aged 89.

== Publications ==
- Rauze, Marianne (1915). Féminisme Économique, Etc. (Économie Politique & Sociale.).
- Rauze, Marianne (1919). L'Illusion Démocratique et la Guerre. La Librairie Ouvrière.
- Rauze, Marianne (1919). La propagande socialiste. Impr. "La Productrice.
- Rauze, Marianne (1920). L'antimilitarisme agissant; ou, Organisation et réalisation. Imprimerie du Progrès.
- Rauze, Marianne (1920). La Femme, du communisme primitif au communisme futur, conférence faite à l'Ecole communiste marxiste. Mary et Moreau.
- Rauze, Marianne; Rolland, Romain; Stoecker; Wilfred Wellock (1923). L'anti-guerre: Essai d'une doctrine et d'une philosophie de l'antimilitarisme en 1923. Impr. du progrès.
- Rauze, Marianne (1925). L'école de la paix. Imprimerie du Progrès.
- Sheng, Cheng; Rauze, Marianne (1926). La Chine pacifique. Association typographique.
- Rauze, Marianne (1927). Nanon, Nanette. l'École émancipée.
- De Ligt, Bart; Rauze, Marianne (1928). Contre la guerre nouvelle. M. Rivière.

== Sources ==
- Accampo, Elinor (2010-09-01). Blessed Motherhood, Bitter Fruit: Nelly Roussel and the Politics of Female Pain in Third Republic France. JHU Press. ISBN 978-0-8018-8896-0.
- Barzman, John (1995). "Entre l'émeute, la manifestation et la concertation: la "crise de la vie chère" de l'été 1919 au Havre". Le Mouvement Social (in French) (170, Regards Américains (January–March 1995)). Editions l'Atelier on behalf of Association Le Mouvement Social: 61–84. doi:10.2307/3779143. JSTOR 3779143.
- Bianchi, Bruna (2014-01-03). "Towards a New Internationalism: Pacifist Journals Edited by Women, 1914-1919". Gender and the First World War. Palgrave Macmillan. ISBN 978-1-137-30220-5.
- French, Marilyn (2008). From Eve to Dawn: Revolutions and the struggles for justice in the 20th century. Feminist Press at CUNY. ISBN 978-1-55861-628-8.
- Greenwald, Lisa (Spring 1996). "Not "Undifferentiated Magma": Refashioning a Female Identity in France, 1944-55". Historical Reflections / Réflexions Historiques. 22 (2). Berghahn Books: 407–430. JSTOR 41299066.
- Maignien, Claude; Sowerwine, Charles (1992). Madeleine Pelletier, une féministe dans l'arène politique (in French). Editions de l'Atelier. ISBN 978-2-7082-2960-0.
- McMillan, James (2002-01-08). France and Women, 1789-1914: Gender, Society and Politics. Routledge. p. 214. ISBN 978-1-134-58958-6.
- "RAUZE Marianne". Dictionnaire Biographique Mouvement Ouvrier Mouvement Social (in French). Maitron.
- Snoek, J.A.M. (2011-12-23). Initiating Women in Freemasonry: The Adoption Rite. BRILL. ISBN 978-90-04-21079-0.
- Sowerwine, Charles (January 1982). Sisters Or Citizens?: Women and Socialism in France Since 1876. Cambridge University Press. p. 76. ISBN 978-0-521-23484-9.
- Waelti-Walters, Jennifer R.; Hause, Steven C. (1994). Feminisms of the Belle Epoque: A Historical and Literary Anthology. U of Nebraska Press. p. 296. ISBN 0-8032-9748-3.
