= Magdeleine Paz =

French journalist, translator, writer and activist

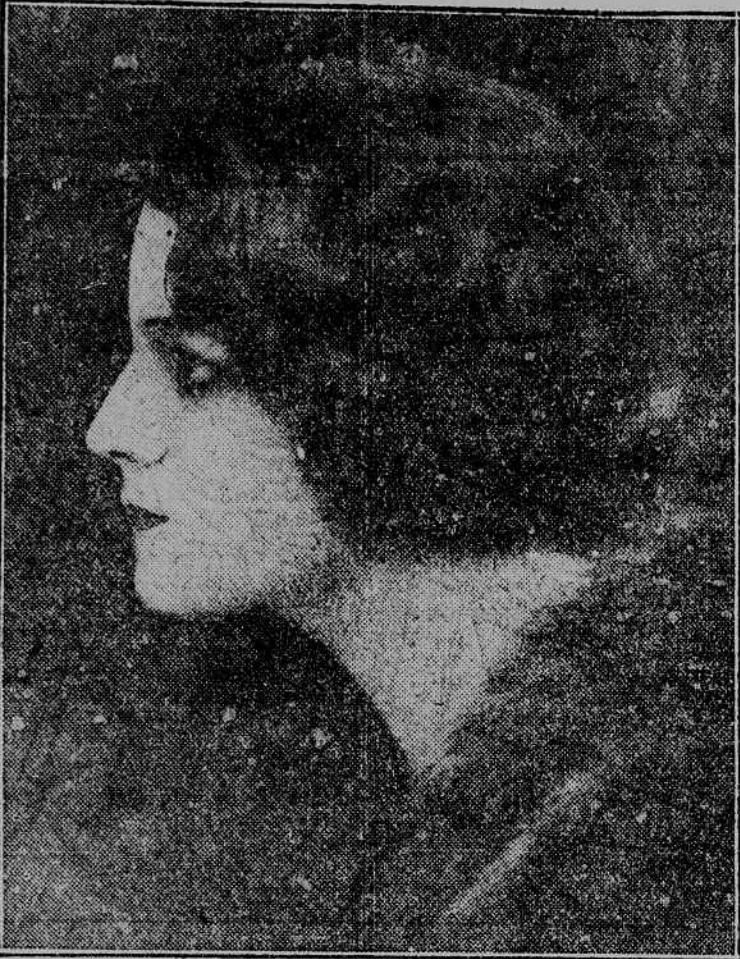
- Born: Magdeleine Legendre; 6 September 1889; Étampes, France
- Died: 12 September 1973 (aged 84); Paris, France
- Other names: Magdeleine Marx
- Occupations: Journalist, writer
- Known for: Activism

Magdeleine Paz (born Magdeleine Legendre, later Magdeleine Marx; 6 September 1889 – 12 September 1973) was a French journalist, translator, writer and activist. She was one of the leading left-wing intellectuals in the interwar period. For a time she belonged to the French Communist Party, but she was expelled due to her support of Leon Trotsky. She was the driving force in the campaign to have Victor Serge released from prison in Russia and allowed to return to the west. She wrote a number of books, and translated several others.

== Life ==
Magdeleine Legendre was born in Étampes, Essonne on September 6, 1889. Her first husband was Henry Marx, and she wrote under her married name Magdeleine Marx. Her second husband was Maurice Paz, whom she married in 1924. She also wrote under the name Magdeleine Paz.

=== Pacifist and feminist ===
Magdeleine Marx was a pacifist during World War I (1914–18). She was a member of the Ghilde Les Forgerons (Guild of the Smiths), which was founded in 1911 by a group of young activist intellectuals who were pupils of the Collège Chaptal and had a common interest in art. They were led by Luc Mériga (pseudonym of Maurice Liger). She organized a conference of the Forgerons on 13 May 1917, Aux femmes qui ne sont pas en guerre (Women who are not at war), where she spoke with great effect to an audience of 300 people. The Ghilde organized its second banquet on 27 April 1919 in honor of Henry Marx, at the time a professor at the Iycee Charlemagne. The Ghilde Les Forgerons was active until 1919, and dissolved in 1920.

Magdeleine Marx was one of the contributors to La Voix des femmes, founded in 1917 by Louise Bodin and Colette Reynaud. Others included Séverine, Marthe Bigot, Hélène Brion, Madeleine Pelletier, Marianne Rauze, Romain Rolland, Henri Barbusse, Léon Werth, Georges Pioch, Georges Yvetôt and Victor Méric. The journal covered a broad range of opinions, with a radical left-leaning outlook. It demanded full sexual equality and emancipation. In 1919, Magdeleine Marx wrote an article in La Voix des femmes in which she argued that women had only themselves to blame for their inferior position, since they had not done anything to stop the war, had not suffered from the war and ignored the sacrifice the men had made. This drew a sharp response from Nelly Roussel, who listed all the ways in which women had suffered from a war that they had no part in starting.

Magdeleine Marx's novel Femme was published in Paris in 1919. It was translated into English by Adele Seltzer and published by Thomas Selzter with an introduction by Henri Barbusse in 1920. Marx asked Bertrand Russell to contribute a few words on the English edition, which he refused to do. The publisher attributed a positive quotation about Woman to Russell when advertising the work. Russell objected, writing "I do not by any means admire the book and have never given anyone the slightest right to say that I do."

=== Communist Party member ===
Magdeleine Marx became a Communist. She joined the Clarté (Clarity) movement that was founded in May 1919 under the direction of Henri Barbusse. Barbusse wanted to keep his organization above party politics, but a minority that included Magdeleine Marx wanted to orient the group towards revolutionary action. She was one of the few Frenchwomen who were able to visit revolutionary Russia in 1919–22, with Madeleine Pelletier and Hélène Brion. In 1923 she published C'est la lutte finale ! (Six mois en Russie soviétique), which defended the revolution in naive terms, probably consciously. In 1923 the American journalist Freda Kirchwey, managing editor of The Nation, published a special issue that covered the Soviet Union. It included the first of a series of articles by Magdelaine Marx on "The New Russian Woman".

Magdeleine Marx became a member of the central women's committee of the French Communist Party. She was part of the left-wing group that was responsible for the November 1924 issue of the review Clarté. This attacked Anatole France, and questioned the direction of the French and Russian Communist parties from an orthodox Marxist viewpoint. In 1925 she was one of the signatories of the Lettre des 250 addressed by left-wing activists to the executive committee of the 3rd International.

=== Later years ===
Due to their criticism of the party line, Magdeleine and her husband Maurice Paz were expelled from the French Communist Party. They were among the founders of the journal Contre le Courant (Against the Flow), launched in November 1927. The journal received some financial assistance from the Left Opposition sent by Georgy Pyatakov. When Leon Trotsky arrived in Turkey early in 1929, Maurice and Magdelaine Paz were among his well-wishers in France who sent him letters of support. They and Alfred and Marguerite Rosmer arranged for Trotsky to write for western newspapers including The New York Times and the London Daily Express. The Pazes and Rosmers came to Turkey to visit Trotsky, and Maurice Paz gave him a loan to meet his expenses. Isaac Deutscher wrote that Trotsky urged the Pazes "to unite their circle with the other groups, to transform Contre le Courant into a 'great and aggressive' weekly speaking with the voice of the Opposition, and to launch an ambitious recruiting campaign." The Pazes agreed at first, but did not go ahead after their return to Paris. They thought that the aggressive young Trotskyites were naive and ignorant, while Trotsky decided that the Pazes were not the sort of dedicated revolutionary he was seeking. Contre le Courant ceased publication before the end of 1929.

Magdeleine and Maurice Paz became involved in the case of the Scottsboro Boys, nine black teenagers accused of rape in Alabama in 1931 who were unable to obtain a fair trial. She was concerned that the Communists had taken over the campaign in France and refused to involve the socialists or the trade union group the Confédération Générale du Travail, (CGT). Paz asked members of the support committee she had organized for Thomas Mooney, an imprisoned American socialist, to take part in the Scottsboro campaign, including Bertrand Russell and Henri Barbusse. She organized a meeting that was attended by 4,000 people. The Communists disagreed with her tactics, and said that if the negroes were executed the fault would lie with the socialists.

Victor Serge, born in Belgium of Russian parents, had spent 17 years in the Soviet Union, and had also contributed to French reviews such as La Vie Ouvrière, Clarté and L'Humanité. For his sympathy with Trotsky he was expelled from the party and thrown in prison. Magdelaine Paz and Jacques Mesnil conducted a tireless campaign on behalf of Serge, writing letters to left-wing journals, talking at conferences and meetings, canvassing influential lawyers and writers, and so on. They managed to turn the case of the writer imprisoned for his beliefs into a cause célèbre. In August 1933 Magdeleine Paz was one of the signatories of an open letter addressed to Henri Barbusse protesting the fact that his periodical Monde had been silent about the case of Victor Serge. It was through the efforts of French left-wing intellectuals led by Magdeleine Paz that Serge was released and allowed to return to Belgium and then France in April 1936.

In 1935 Magdeleine Paz joined the Comité de liaison contre la guerre et l‟union sacrée (Liaison committee against war and the union sacrée), a pacifist organization. In the early 1930s Magdeleine Paz became a member of the Ligue des droits de l’Homme (League of Human Rights), representing the Socialist Party. The Cahiers of the League refused to publish an article by Magdeleine Paz in which she denounced the Moscow Trials held between 1936 and 1938. The League was now packed with fellow-travelers sympathetic to the Russian regime.

Magdeleine Paz died in Paris on 12 September 1973, aged 84.

== Works ==
- Femme, Flammarion, Paris, 1919, foreword by Henri Barbusse
- Toi, Flammarion, Paris, 1921
- C'est la lutte finale ! (Six mois en Russie soviétique), Flammarion, Paris, 1923
- The Romance of New Russia, (translated by Anita Grannis) Thomas Seltzer, New York, 1924
- La Perfide (Par les routes d'Asie Mineure), Flammarion, Paris, 1925
- Notre père , publisher not named, 1925
- Une grande grève aux États-Unis : Passaic, 1926, Librairie du Travail, Paris, 1927
- Frère noir, Flammarion, Paris, 1930
- Une seule chair, Corréa, 1933
- Femmes à vendre, Rieder, Paris, 1936
- Regards sur le Maroc, Editions du Parti Socialiste, Paris, 1938
- Aux portes du camp de rassemblement des sujets allemands et autrichiens, Le Populaire, 12 September 1939, pp=1–2
- La vie d'un grand homme, George Sand, Corréa, 1947

== Sources ==
- Accampo, Elinor (2010-09-01). Blessed Motherhood, Bitter Fruit: Nelly Roussel and the Politics of Female Pain in Third Republic France. JHU Press. ISBN 978-0-8018-8896-0.
- Alexander, Robert Jackson (1991-01-01). International Trotskyism, 1929-1985: A Documented Analysis of the Movement. Duke University Press. ISBN 0-8223-1066-X.
- Alpern, Sara (1987). Freda Kirchwey, a Woman of the Nation. Harvard University Press. p. 47. ISBN 978-0-674-31828-1.
- Caute, David (1988-01-01). The Fellow-travellers: Intellectual Friends of Communism. Yale University Press. p. 131. ISBN 978-0-300-04195-8.
- Cœuré, Sophie (2003). "Hélène Brion en " Russie rouge " (1920-1922). "". Le Mouvement Social (in French) (4).
- Desanges, Paul (April–June 1975). "Chronique d'une communauté militante: Les Forgerons (1911-1920)". Le Mouvement Social (91, Culture et militantisme en France: De la Belle Époque au Front Populaire). Editions l'Atelier on behalf of Association Le Mouvement Social: 35–58. doi:10.2307/3807287. JSTOR 3807287.
- Dreyfus, Michel; Pennetier, Claude; Viet-Depaule, Nathalie (1996). La part des militants: biographie et mouvement ouvrier, autour du Maitron, Dictionnaire biographique du mouvement ouvrier français. Editions de l'Atelier. ISBN 978-2-7082-3226-6.
- Flower, John (2013-01-17). Historical Dictionary of French Literature. Scarecrow Press. ISBN 978-0-8108-7945-4.
- Lawrence, D. H. (2007). The Letters of D. H. Lawrence: October 1916-June 1921. Cambridge University Press. ISBN 978-0-521-01305-5.
- Le Tallec, Mathieu (2012). "L'unité d'action des trotskystes, anarchistes et socialistes de gauche autour de l'anticolonialisme et de l'anti-bonapartisme (1954-1958)" (PDF). Diacronie: Studi di Storia Contemporanea (9).
- "Magdeleine Marx (1889-1973)". Action n° 2 (Revue) (1920). Archived from the original on 2014-12-14.
- "Magdeleine Paz (1889-1973)". BnF.
- Omnès, Jacques (1984-01-01). "L'accueil des émigrés politiques". Les Bannis de Hitler: accueil et luttes des exilés allemands en France (1933-1939). Editions de l'Atelier. ISBN 978-2-85139-074-5.
- Panné, Jean-Louis (1984). "L'affaire Victor Serge". Le mouvement communiste international et ses oppositions. L'AGE D'HOMME. ISBN 978-2-13-038446-5.
- Pascal, Pierre (1982-01-01). Mon journal de Russie: Tome 4, Russie 1927. L'AGE D'HOMME. ISBN 978-2-8251-2165-8.
- Pennybacker, Susan Dabney (2009). From Scottsboro to Munich: Race and Political Culture in 1930s Britain. Princeton University Press. ISBN 978-0-691-08828-0.
- Racine, Nicole (1967). "Une revue d'intellectuels communistes dans les années vingt : " Clarté " (1921-1928)". Revue française de science politique. 17 (3).
- Russell, Bertrand (2000). Uncertain Paths to Freedom: Russia and China, 1919-22. Psychology Press. ISBN 978-0-415-09411-5.
- Surya, Michel (2002). Georges Bataille: An Intellectual Biography. Verso. ISBN 978-1-85984-822-7.
- Weissman, Susan (2001). Victor Serge: The Course is Set on Hope. Verso. ISBN 978-1-85984-987-3.
