= Camille Drevet =

French anti-colonialist and activist (1881–1969)

- Born: Camille Bonnat; June 21, 1881; Grenoble, France
- Died: May 18, 1969 (aged 87); Annecy, France
- Occupations: anti-colonialist, feminist, pacifist activist, newspaper editor
- Known for: International secretary, Women's International League for Peace and Freedom (LIFPL)
- Spouse: Henri-Paul Drevet (m. 1904; died 1914)

Camille Drevet née Bonnat (June 21, 1881 – May 18, 1969) was a French anti-colonialist, feminist activist and pacifist. She was an important figure in the French section of the League against Imperialism. She served as international secretary of Women's International League for Peace and Freedom (LIFPL).

== Early life and education ==
Born in Grenoble on June 21, 1881, Camille Bonnat was the daughter of Eugène Bonnat, a teacher, and Marie-Louise née Génon.

She was a scholarship student at the Grenoble high school then at the Collège Sévigné in Paris and still later at the Sorbonne University.

== Career ==
On August 29, 1904 in Grenoble, she married Henri-Paul Drevet, a lieutenant in the Chasseurs Alpins, who was sent to the front in World War I and died in Wancourt on October 2, 1914. His death was behind Drevet's subsequent anti-war activism. She moved to Paris in September 1920.

Drevet was involved in the establishment of "La Ligue d’action féminine pour le suffrage des femmes", triggered by the Friends of La Voix des femmes. The first meeting of the league took place on December 6, 1925, at the home of Marthe Bray in Paris. About thirty people were present, including the pacifist Gabrielle Duchêne. Together with Colette Reynaud, from January 21, 1926, Drevet served as editor-in-chief of the feminist newspaper La Voix des femmes.

In September 1926, alongside Gabrielle Duchêne, Marcelle Capy, and Germaine Kellerson, Drevet represented the French at the congress of the Women's International League for Peace and Freedom (WILPF), held in Dublin, Ireland. Subsequently, in preparation for the Eastern European Congress (Vienna), Drevet's travels took her to the Baltic and Balkan States.

On June 16, 1927, at the League against Imperialism conference in Brussels, Drevet was elected to the steering committee of the organization's French section. Many activists from the European and American Left were present, such as Fenner Brockway, Arthur MacManus, Edo Fimmen, Reginald Bridgeman, and Gabrielle Duchêne, as well as intellectuals such as Henri Barbusse, Victor Basch, Romain Rolland, and Albert Einstein. That year, Drevet and Edith Pye traveled to French Indochina as WILPF delegates.

Drevet was appointed international secretary of the WILPF in December 1930, in Geneva to replace Mary Sheepshanks. As Drevet's presence in Switzerland was considered by the Swiss authorities to advance the interests of Bolshevism, she left the area on July 14, 1933. She joined the ranks of the International League of Peace Fighters in the same year.

Drevet served as secretary of Les Amis de Gandhi (Friends of Gandhi) for several years, seeking to spread his message. In February 1957, in collaboration with Les Amis de Gandhi, Drevet and Louis Massignon visited Jules Monchanin at the Benedictine Saccidananda Ashram in India.

== Death ==
Camille Drevet died in Annecy, May 18, 1969.

== Selected works ==
- Au cœur des Balkans. La Bulgarie, Paris, 1938
- Massignon et Gandhi, Le Cerf, 1967
