= Halbwachs =

Halbwachs is a German-language surname. Notable people with the surname include:

- Aurelie Halbwachs (born 1986), Mauritian road bicycle racer
- Jeanne Halbwachs (1890-1980), French pacifist, feminist and socialist
- Maurice Halbwachs (1877–1945), French philosopher and sociologist

== See also ==
- Hallwachs
