= Jeanne Halbwachs =

French pacifist, feminist and socialist

Jeanne Halbwachs Alexandre
- Born: Jeanne Halbwachs; February 14, 1890; Paris, France
- Died: November 14, 1980 (aged 90); Fontainebleau, Seine-et-Marne, France
- Occupations: Pacifist; feminist; socialist; educator; literary critic
- Spouse: Michel Alexandre (m. 1916; died 1952)
- Relatives: Maurice Halbwachs (brother)

Jeanne Halbwachs Alexandre (née Halbwachs; February 14, 1890 – November 14, 1980) was a French pacifist, feminist and socialist. Remembered as one of the main figures of integral pacifism in the 1930s, she was a leader of the French branch of the Women's International League for Peace and Freedom (WILPF). She was also an educator and literary critic.

== Early life and education ==
Jeanne Halbwachs was born in Paris on February 14, 1890. Coming from a background of Alsatian intellectuals, her father was Gustave Halbwachs, normalien and professor of German, who had chosen France after the Franco-Prussian War of 1870. Her mother was a philosophy student. Jeanne's brother was the sociologist Maurice Halbwachs.

As a student at the Lycée Fénelon in Paris, the Dreyfus affair marked her, and she welcomed the Russian revolution of 1905. In 1909, while a student of Alain at Collège Sévigné, she was strongly influenced by his thinking. Halbwachs, Marie-Hélène Latrilhe and Jeanne Daste forced their entry into the very masculine group, Étudiants socialistes révolutionnaires internationalistes (Internationalist Revolutionary Socialist Students, ESRI).

== Career ==
Placed first in the Agrégation examination results in 1913, Halbwachs taught at the Cours Fénelon from 1914 to 1915, then at the Collège Sévigné, refusing to be appointed to public education in the provinces; staying in Paris enabled her to study philosophy at the Sorbonne, especially political activity. As a woman, she sought to benefit from the legitimacy she enjoyed as a high school teacher.

In 1914, Halbwachs joined the French Section of the Workers' International (SFIO) and the Ligue Française pour le Droit des Femmes (LFDF) of Maria Vérone. During the campaign for the legislative elections held the same year, Halbwachs took part in a demonstration calling for the registration of women on electoral lists and spoke at various electoral meetings insisting on the need for women's suffrage. She wrote in the magazine L'Équité, created by Marianne Rauze, asking women to stop the war, citing the example of Italian women who had lain down on railway tracks to prevent trains of soldiers from leaving the station during the Italo-Turkish War. The rallying of the SFIO, trade unions, and feminist movements to the Sacred Union at the start of World War I dismayed Halbwachs. According to Halbwachs, peace was indeed the most important struggle, which she linked to her feminist struggle, believing that women with the right to vote could provide a powerful pacifist electorate. She then joined the minority pacifists.

=== World War I ===
In October 1914, Halbwachs was hired part-time in the legal services of the League of Human Rights (LDH), at the request of its president, Victor Basch. She moved away from the SFIO section of the 13th arrondissement of Paris and the League for Women's Rights to join the few peace activists. Enthused by Romain Rolland's text, Au-dessus de la mêlée (Above the fray) as well as by the results of the Zimmerwald Conference, she notably met Alfred Rosmer and the former general secretary of the LDH, Mathias Morhardt. Not ready to give up, even though she realized her stand for pacifism had set her apart, she became involved in an employment office where she was able to help the refugees and the unemployed, and made clothes for soldiers. At the same time, the feminist Jeanne Mélin followed a similar course in the Cher department, but the two women did not know each other.

In 1915, a pacifist split in the international feminist movement (notably American and Dutch women) organized an International Congress of Women in The Hague, where the Women's International League for Peace and Freedom (WILPF) was founded. Along with the feminists Gabrielle Duchêne and Séverine, Halbwachs provided support, outraging the LFDF leadership, who considered it inappropriate to discuss responsibilities for war with German women. Halbwachs participated in the creation of the French section of the committee: Duchêne became president and Halbwachs, secretary. The two women and several others were signatories to the "Manifesto of French Women Addressed to The Hague Congress". On May 22, Halbwachs sent a letter to the writer Romain Rolland, explaining how helpless she felt, to which he replied: Ne désespérez jamais! (Never despair).

In addition to these three women, the small section counted among its members the English teacher Madeleine Rolland, the writer's sister, Marthe Bigot, and Marguerite Rosmer, wife of Alfred Rosmer. In September, through Alain, the group established contact with the young philosophy professor Michel Alexandre in order to direct its action in a more determined way. With a small office at 32 rue Fondary (15th arrondissement), where Duchêne created the l'Office du travail féminin à domicile (Office for Women's Work at Home) before the war, the section decided to publish a brochure calling for a quick peace. The text was written by Michel Alexandre then amended by Halbwachs under the title Un devoir urgent pour les femmes (An urgent duty for women). Printed in 10,000 copies and avoiding censorship, it was distributed to teachers and postal employees. What became known as the scandale de la rue Fondary (Fondary street scandal) resulted in Duchêne and Halbwachs being questioned by the police and the latter's correspondence being monitored. The French section of the WILPF had to cease activities.

In August 1916, Halbwachs married Michel Alexandre. She continued her pacifist activities at the LDH, the litigation services becoming a discreet hub for pacifist activists and associations, such as the Société d'études documentaires et critiques sur la guerre (Society for Documentary and Critical Studies on War) created by Mathias Morhardt. The newlyweds then moved to Le Puy. Between January and the autumn of 1916, defying censorship, Halbwachs published articles every week in Le Populaire du Centre, a journal that brought together the pacifist socialist minority around the SFIO deputy, Adrien Pressemane. She expressed her thoughts, often in connection with how industrialists bore responsibility for war or how proposals for peace were simply ignored. Moreover, she still failed to understand how most of those in the feminist movement had joined the Sacred Union. Criticizing the employment of women to manufacture shells or to be forced to work in the fields, Halbwachs also denounced the demonization of the Germans and the execution of the nurse Edith Cavell. She also collaborated for a short period with Populaire hebdomadaire (Popular weekly). Generating articles and interventions, she did not hesitate to engage in verbal discourse. In 1917, noting the inertia of the minority pacifists, the couple shifted away from the LDH and left the SFIO.

The same year, Halbwachs and her husband were transferred to the high school in Lons-le-Saunier. Halbwachs continued to be a member of the French section of the CIFFP, which soon became the Women's International League for Peace and Freedom (WILPF), but she did not play a major role in it. For many activists, the World War I was a traumatic event that forged the massive pacifism of the 1920s and 1930s; but for Halbwachs, who was characterized by her ideological constancy, the choice of peace was older and did not vary. As historian Françoise Thébaud noted,—

"more pacifist than feminist, [she seeks] to build peace on justice and equality between men".

=== Interwar period ===
A professor of philosophy and admirer of Alain, like her husband, Halbwachs taught at the girls' high school in Nîmes from 1919 to 1927, then that of Versailles, followed by Limoges during World War II, and finally returning to Paris, to the Lycée Victor-Hugo and to the Lycée Victor Duruy.

During the interwar period, from 1921 to 1936, the couple were the main writers in Alain's periodical, Libres propos (Free Speech). Halbwachs directed the cultural section and her husband, the political section. She wrote more than 400 literary reviews there. Isabelle Vahé summed up Halbwachs' many works as follows:—

"Jeanne Alexandre seeks in her columns to share with her readers the horror of the Great War, to publicize France–Germany relations, to develop education for peace, to "promote the 'action for peace'"

Halbwachs's concern for feminism steadily diminished in favor of social and pacifist activism, which became more radical to the point of becoming "integral". As noted by Cédric Weis, who devoted a book to her:—

"For Jeanne Alexandre, peace does not admit any compromise with violence".

She thus joined the dominant trend of feminism between the wars, where action for peace soon supplanted suffragist demands. By collaborating with Libres propos, Halbwachs sought to help prevent the arrival of a new war, always a basic concern for her, closely related to the question of women's right to vote. She was more nuanced than the biologist feminists, for whom the "maternal experience naturally leads to pacifism" and considered above all, without denying the existence of a "feminine nature", the question of peace as a consequence of equality and justice.

Following the 6 February 1934 crisis, Halbwachs joined the Comité de vigilance des intellectuels antifascistes (CVIA), where she only had marginal responsibilities. After the Munich Agreement, she participated in the creation of Septembre 1938 (September 1938), a group of women which included Magdeleine Paz, and wrote the brochure La défense passive, la mort masquée (Passive defense, masked death) for it in early 1939. It was reviewed by Paul Langevin, one of the founders of CVIA. She was then accused of being a defeatist collaborationist, unable to see the reality caused by concern for reconciliation of peoples, which led her to her to refuse to endorse a war against Hitler. This attitude illustrates how the die-hard rejection of war was the priority for a certain number of integral pacifists of the time. However, this tendency was not the only representative of the pacifist movement of the 1930s, where several lines coexisted, fragmented and difficult to reconcile.

=== World War II and later life ===
At the start of World War II, Louis Lecoin published the tract, Paix immédiate! (Immediate Peace), which brought on legal proceedings for him. As one of the signatories, Mr. and Mrs. Alexandre were also worried. The war led to the temporary suspension of classes in the high schools where they taught (Lycée Louis-le-Grand and Versailles). They moved to Clermont-Ferrand, where they worked until the Armistice of 22 June 1940. During the Occupation, the couple ceased all militant activity. They returned to Paris in the fall and, in December, Michel Alexandre was forbidden to teach because of his Jewish ancestry. He was then interned in the Royallieu-Compiègne internment camp. The couple managed to reach Limoges, in the free zone, in January 1942; Halbwachs was appointed professor there. They returned to Paris at the end of the war, but kept away from politics.

Michel Alexandre died in 1952 and his widow then worked to publish his old papers, in order to perpetuate his memory. She was also secretary of the association des Amis d'Alain (Friends of Alain association). Halbwachs retired from teaching in 1955.

== Death and legacy ==
Jeanne Halbwachs Alexandre died in Fontainebleau, Seine-et-Marne, November 14, 1980.

Since 1982, the archives of Jeanne Halbwachs and Michel Alexandre have been kept at La contemporaine, on the campus of Paris Nanterre University. Others documents are archived are in the municipal library of Nîmes.

== See also ==
- List of peace activists
