= Hallwachs =

Halbwachs is a German surname. Notable people with the surname include:

- Wilhelm Hallwachs (1859–1922), German physicist
- Hans Peter Hallwachs (1938–2022), German television actor

== See also ==
- Halbwachs
