= Chamagne =

- Commune
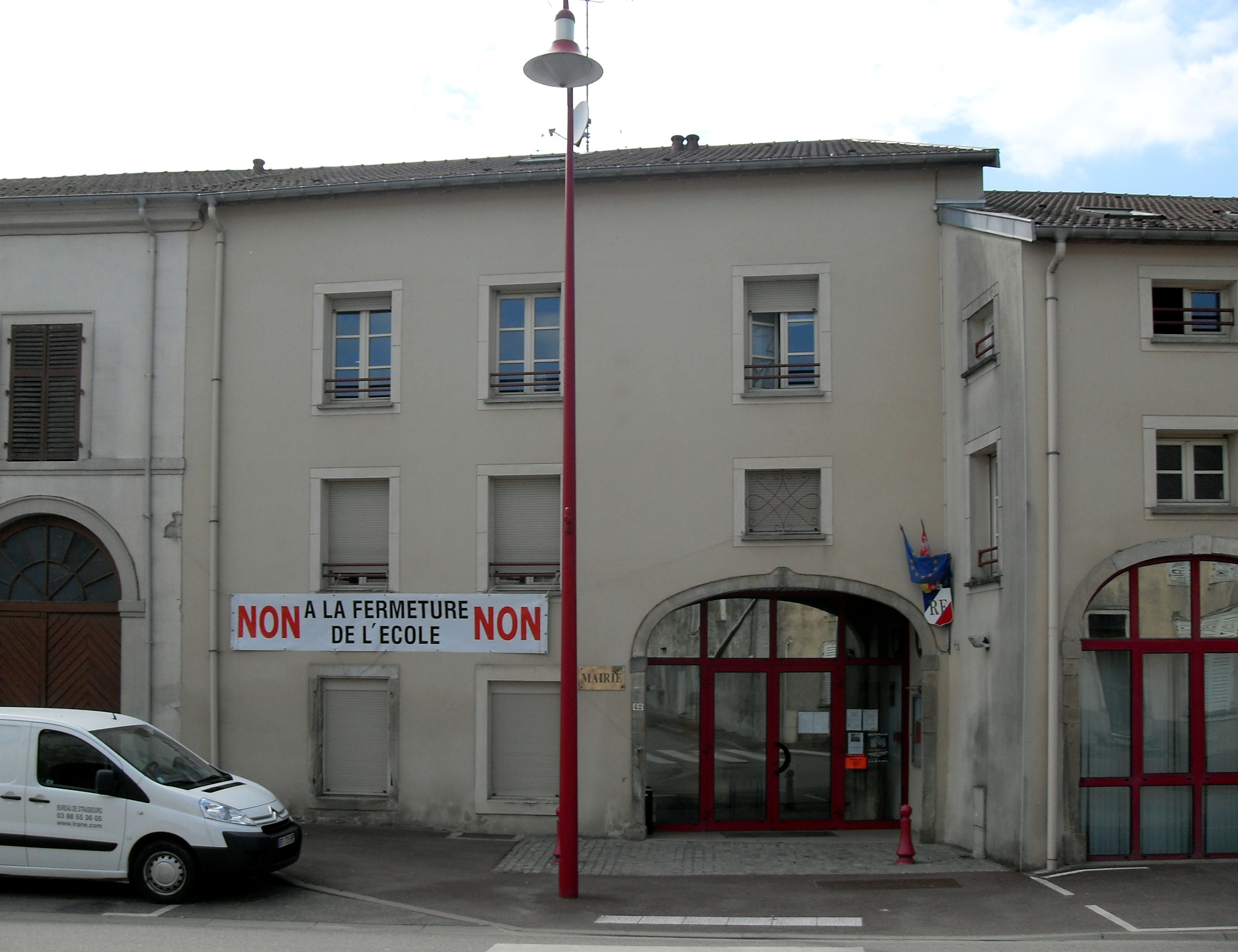
- The town hall in Chamagne

- Coat of arms
- Location of Chamagne
- Location within France Location within Grand Est
- Coordinates: 48°24′33″N 6°16′51″E
- Country: France
- Region: Grand Est
- Department: Vosges
- Arrondissement: Épinal
- Canton: Charmes
- Intercommunality: CA Épinal

Government
  - Mayor (2020–2026): Stéphane Boeuf
- Area^{1}: 15.29 km^{2} (5.90 sq mi)
- Elevation: 293 m (961 ft)
- Highest elevation: 342 m (1,122 ft)
- Lowest elevation: 254 m (833 ft)
- Population (2023): 446
  - Density: 29.2/km^{2} (75.5/sq mi)
- Time zone: UTC+01:00 (CET)
  - Summer (DST): UTC+02:00 (CEST)
- INSEE/Postal code: 88084 /88130
- ^{1} French Land Register data, which excludes lakes, ponds, glaciers > 1 km^{2} (0.386 sq mi or 247 acres) and river estuaries.

Chamagne (French pronunciation: [ʃamaɲ]) is a commune in the Vosges department in Grand Est in northeastern France.

== Notable people ==
- Alice Jouenne (1873-1954), teacher and socialist activist
- Claude Lorrain (1600–1682), painter, draughtsman and etcher of the Baroque era.

== See also ==
- Communes of the Vosges department
