= André Arnyvelde =

- Born: André David Lévy; 29 November 1881
- Died: 2 February 1942 (aged 60); Compiègne
- Occupations: Novelist, journalist, dramatist
- Spouse: Henriette Sauret

André Arnyvelde (29 November 1881 – 2 February 1942) was a French journalist, dramatist and novelist. A Jew, he was imprisoned in the Royallieu-Compiègne internment camp, where he died in 1942.

== Works ==
- La Courtisane, dramatic comedy in five acts, in verses, Éditions Fasquelle, 1906
- L'Arche, Société mutuelle d'édition, 1920

== Sources ==
- Claude Carras, « Ceux qu'ils ont tué : André Arnyvelde », Gavroche, 8 février 1945, p. 33.
- Jean-Yves Tadié, Marcel Proust, Gallimard, 1996, p. 707
