= La Voix des femmes (France, 1917) =

French feminist newspaper (1917–1937)

- "feminist, pacifist, socialist and internationalist"
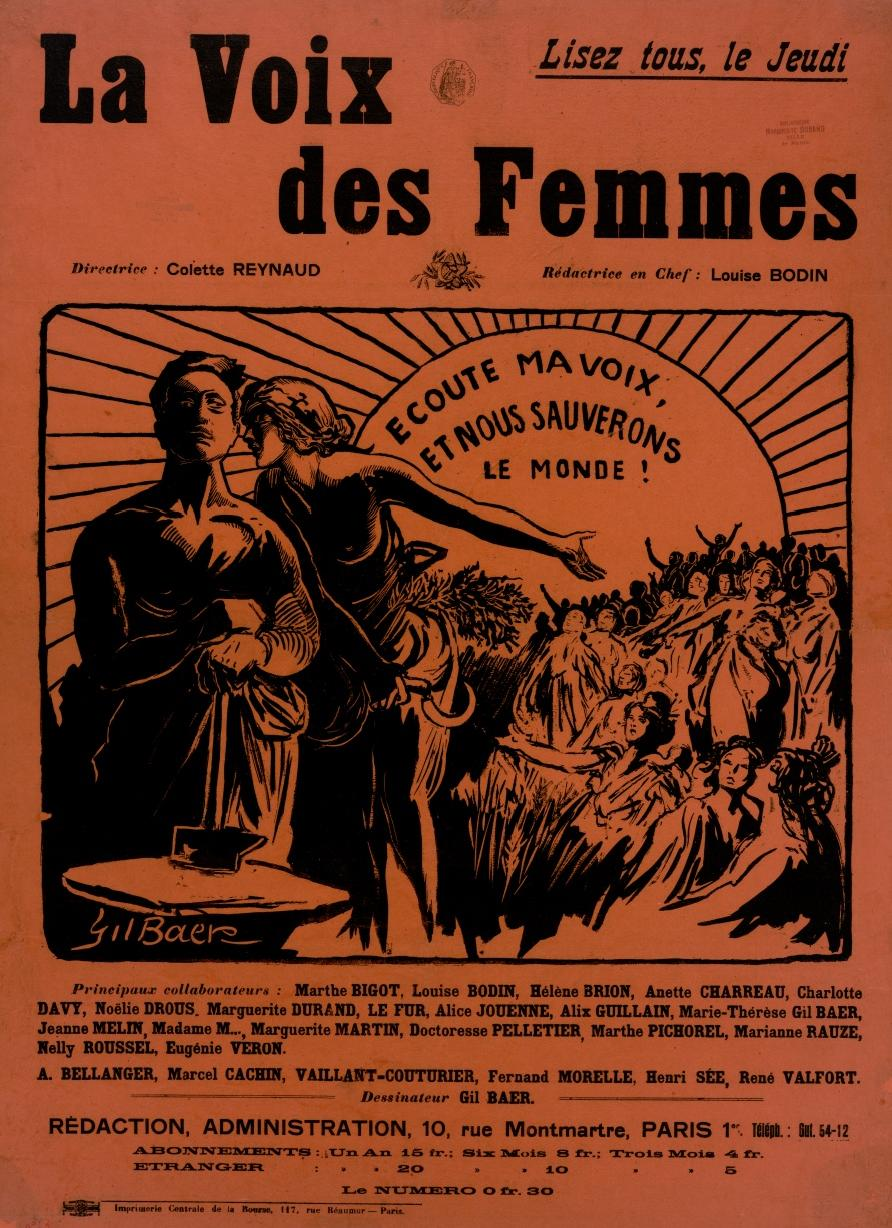
- Type: Daily, weekly, bi-weekly newspaper
- Founders: Colette Reynaud; Louise Bodin
- Editor-in-chief: Louise Bodin
- General manager: Colette Reynaud
- Political alignment: Socialist
- Language: French
- City: Paris
- Country: France

La Voix des femmes (French pronunciation: [la vwa de fam]) was a "political, social, scientific, artistic" weekly newspaper, founded in 1917 by Colette Reynaud and Louise Bodin, the first issue of which was published on October 31, 1917. The newspaper, which proclaimed itself in 1919 as "feminist, pacifist, socialist and internationalist", appeared until 1937.

== History ==
In 1917, Colette Reynaud and Louise Bodin founded La Voix des femmes, a "political, social, scientific and artistic" weekly newspaper, the first issue of which was published on October 31, 1917. Created during the World War I, the newspaper opposed the Sacred Union. Bodin's editorial in the first issue of October 31, 1917, was widely censored.

Alice Jouenne contributed to the redesign of La Voix des femmes, the first issue of which came out on October 18, 1919. On this date, its publication schedule changed from weekly to bi-weekly. It also proclaimed itself "feminist, pacifist, socialist and internationalist". It contained articles by Marthe Bigot, Bodin, Annette Charreau, Fanny Clar, Alice Jouenne, Leyciat, Magdeleine Marx, Marianne Rauze, Henriette Sauret, and Monette Thomas.

La Voix des femmes brought together feminists, pacifists, supporters of the extreme left as well as neo-Malthusians. It declared that "All socialist women should buy and read this issue and then subscribe". Henri Barbusse, Romain Rolland, Marcel Cachin, Madeleine Pelletier, Victor Méric, Nelly Roussel, Séverine, Marthe Bigot, Hélène Brion, Marcelle Capy, and Georges Pioch in particular regularly published articles there. Socialist women found support there, and Louise Bodin launched appeals in favor of the Socialist International Women.

Daily in 1922, it became weekly again at the end of the year. From January 21, 1926, Reynaud and Camille Drevet served as editors of the newspaper. La Voix des femmes ceased publication in 1937.
