= Georges Pioch =

French poet, journalist, pacifist and socialist intellectual

Georges Jules Charles Pioch
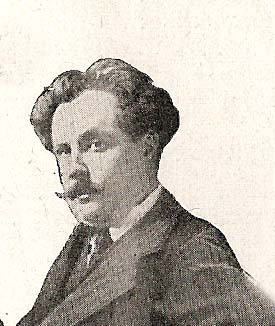
- Pioch from Je sais Tout (1909)
- Born: 9 October 1873; Paris, France
- Died: 27 March 1953 (aged 79); Nice, France
- Occupation: Journalist
- Known for: President of the International League for Peace

Georges Jules Charles Pioch (9 October 1873 – 27 March 1953) was a French poet, journalist, pacifist and socialist intellectual. He was president of the International League for Peace from 1930 to 1937.

== Early years ==
Georges Pioch was born in Paris on 9 October 1873. He began writing, and published collections of poetry in the Mercure de France. He contributed to Paul Fort's review Vers et prose, and was associated with Saint-Georges de Bouhélier. His early works such as La Légende blasphémée (1897), Toi (1897), Le Jour qu'on aime (1898) and Instants de Ville (1898) received good reviews.

As a journalist, from 1900 Pioch wrote on literary and dramatic topics for the Libertaire. Pioch was editor of Gil Blas in 1910, and of Hommes du jour in 1914. He belonged to a group of intellectuals who were committed to the liberation of Alfred Dreyfus. They defended truth and believed that intellectuals should join with the people. In 1914 he contributed to the monthly review La Caravane. In his book 15 000 ! La Foire électorale (1914) he described the elections of 26 April 1914. He observed that the passion and solemnity of the events were more the work of art than of nature, and the heart was not present.

== Socialist ==
In 1915 Pioch joined the Socialist Party (SFIO). In 1917 Louise Bodin and Colette Reynaud founded the journal La Voix des femmes, to which the major feminists contributed including Nelly Roussel and Hélène Brion. The first issue of La Voix des Femmes appeared on 31 August 1917. Contributors included men such as Boris Souvarine and Georges Pioch as well as women such as Colette Reynaud. In March 1918, Pioch, Séverine, Han Ryner, Léon Werth, Gérard de Lacaze-Duthiers, Génold and Maurice Wullens founded Franchise, a short-lived pacifist and socialist weekly.

After World War I (1914–18), Pioch joined the Blacksmiths' Guild (Ghilde des forgerons), an actively pacifist intellectual organization. He prepared the literary program of an event sponsored by the Socialist party at the Trocadéro on 31 July 1919 where 8,000 people paid tribute to the war dead. On 23 October 1919, he participated in an event organized by the journal Clarté in favor of the Russian Revolution, where 5,000 people heard him speak. In 1920, Pioch was secretary of the SFIO's Federation of the Seine. Just after the end of the Tours Congress pacifist intellectuals including Pioch, Victor Méric and others took a position of opposition to all war, including defense of socialism. At Leon Trotsky's request, in November 1922, the Executive of the Communist International expelled Pioch from the Communist party.

== Pacifist ==
Ferdinand Faure, Frossard, Ernest Lafont, Henry Torres, Victor Meric and George Pioch then founded the Unitary Communist Party, which was based on the class struggle, refusal of national defense under capitalism, internal democracy in the party and union independence. He joined the staff of Paris-Soir with other former members of the editorial team of l'Humanité including Frossard, Aimé and Victor Méric. Pioch was recognized as one of the leading critics of music and theater of the time. Pioch joined the League of Human Rights (Ligue des Droits de l'Homme) and was involved in the struggle led by Bernard Lecache in 1926–27 for Sholom Schwartzbard. Pioch wrote at the time for L'Ère Nouvelle, described as a sort of official organ of the radical party, as did the president of the League Victor Basch. In 1927 he became vice-president of the Society of Friends of Jewish settlement in the USSR, whose goal was to assist Russian Jewish populations decimated by pogroms.

At the end of December 1930, Pioch created and chaired the International League for Peace fighters. Romain Rolland was the Honorary President and Victor Méric secretary-general. The honorary committee included Albert Einstein, Stefan Zweig, Upton Sinclair, Paul Langevin, Georges Duhamel, Charles Vildrac and Jules Romains. For twenty issues from 4 October 1930 until 14 February 1931, Pioch wrote a weekly column for La Volonté, appearing on Saturdays, called La Vie qui passe ou qui s'attarde. The column gave a philosophical commentary on the main events of the previous week. The column began with a ballad dated Friday of the previous week, followed by prose about the other days of the week. In 1931 he published the Vingt ballades (Twenty ballads), which reflected his pacifist views. He resigned from the International League in 1937, saying the organization did not condemn the Moscow Trials strongly enough.

During World War II (1939–45) Pioch at first published in the collaborationist press under the Vichy regime. As late as August 1942 Pioch was writing criticism of the opera in l'Oeuvre. He retired from public activity the next year. In a 1943 letter he wrote "I continue to purge, not without a certain intimate pride, the honor which is done me by the passions of the occupation to be booted out of the so-called Paris press, and, even, forbidden to publish at all. Georges Pioch died in Nice on 27 March 1953, aged 79.

== Publications ==
Pioch's publications included:

- Toi Mercure de France 1896
- La Légende blasphémée Mercure de France, 1897
- Le Jour qu'on aime Mercure de France, 1898
- Les Palmes harmonieuses Mercure de France, 1898
- Le Saint, drame en un acte Editions de la Revue d'Art Dramatique, 1902
- L'Impuissance d'Hercule Messein, 1904
- La Bonté d'aimer, Messein 1905
- Les Dieux chez nous Ollendorff, 1912
- 15 000 ! La Foire électorale Ollendorff, 1914
- La Paix inconnue et dolente vers et poèmes, L'Epi, 1929
- Vingt ballades frappées à l'effigie de la Paix Les Ecrivains indépendants, 1930

== Sources ==
- Burrows, Stephanie (2001). Tucholsky and France. MHRA. ISBN 978-1-902653-62-4.
- Degott, Bertrand (1996-01-01). Ballade n'est pas morte: étude sur la pratique de la ballade médiévale depuis 1850. Presses Univ. Franche-Comté. ISBN 978-2-251-60602-6.
- Faivre-Zellner, Catherine (2014). "Georges Pioch".
- "Fonds Bouglé, sous-fonds Louise Bodin". Archives du féminisme.
- "Georges Pioch (1873-1953)". BNF.
- Mendès, Catulle (1903). Le mouvement poétique français de 1867 à 1900. Slatkine. ISBN 978-2-05-101274-4.
- Moure, Kenneth; Alexander, Martin S. (2002-01-15). Crisis and Renewal in France. Berghahn Books. ISBN 978-1-78238-164-8.
- Nouvion, Francois (2012). Asile Hereditaire: The Life and Career of John O'Sullivan. Xlibris Corporation. ISBN 978-1-4771-5123-5.
- Romanelli, Raffaele (1998-01-01). How Did They Become Voters?: The History of Franchise in Modern European Representation. Kluwer Law International. ISBN 978-90-411-1012-1.
- Schiappa, Jean-Marc (1989). "COSNIER Colette, La bolchevique aux bijoux". Communisme - Révolution Française. L'AGE D'HOMME. ISBN 978-2-8251-3407-8.
