= Hélène Brion =

French socialist feminist (1882–1962)

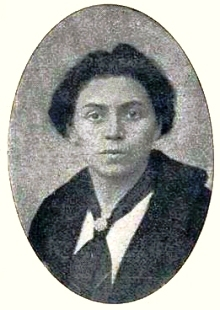
- Hélène Brion in November 1917
- Born: 27 January 1882; Clermont-Ferrand, Auvergne, France
- Died: 31 August 1962 (aged 80); Ennery, Val-d'Oise, France
- Occupation: Teacher
- Known for: Feminism, pacifism

Hélène Brion (27 January 1882 – 31 August 1962) was a French teacher, feminist, socialist and communist. She was one of the leaders of the French teachers' union. During World War I (1914–18) she was arrested for distributing pacifist propaganda, given a suspended sentence and dismissed from her job as a teacher. She visited Russia soon after the Russian Revolution, and wrote a book on her experiences. It was never published. She devoted much of her effort in later years to preparing a feminist encyclopedia, which was never completed or published.

== Early years ==
Hélène Brion was born in Clermont-Ferrand, Auvergne on 27 January 1882. Her family were teachers. She was orphaned when very young, and spent her childhood in the Ardennes with her grandmother. She studied at the Ecole Primaire Supérieure Sophie Germain in Paris to become a teacher. Unions had been authorized in 1884, but state employees could not belong to them. They could however join friendly societies. Brion was working as a teacher in 1905 when she enrolled in the new federation of school teachers and in the Socialist Party (SFIO). Brion never married, but around 1905–07 she had two children by a Russian immigrant. She taught at a nursery school (école maternelle) in Pantin, on the outskirts of Paris.

Brion was active in various feminist organizations for most of her life, fighting for equal legal rights for women and for the vote. These would include Le Suffrage des Femmes, L’Union fraternelle des Femmes, La Fédération féminine universitaire, La Ligue pour le droit des femmes, L’Union française pour le suffrage des femmes and La Ligue nationale du vote. In 1907 the International Socialist Conference of Stuttgart forbade socialist women from collaborating with "bourgeois" feminists. Brion, Marthe Bigot and Madeleine Pelletier resisted this decision. While belonging to the extreme left, they tried to maintain radical feminism.

== Union leader and pacifist ==
After the Congress of Chambéry in 1912 Hélène Brion joined the Confederal Committee of the Confédération Générale du Travail (CGT: General Confederation of Labor). She became assistant secretary of the teachers' union in January 1914. With the outbreak of World War I in July 1914 the teachers' union office was reduced to Brion as acting secretary general and Fernand Loriot as treasurer. Loriot was appointed treasurer of the Federation of Teachers' Unions in 1915, and was appointed by Brion to the central committee. He devoted much effort to fighting the nationalist unions that supported the war, along with Alphonse Merrheim, Albert Bourderon and Raymond Péricat.

At the start of the war Brion accepted the union sacrée, where the unions would not work against the war. She opened a soup kitchen in Pantin. Many teachers were mobilized and others supported the war effort, but later a strong pacifist movement developed among them. Marie Mayoux called a pacifist meeting at the union office in June 1915. On 15 August 1915 a pacifist resolution was presented at the CGT's national congress at the initiative of Albert Bourderon and Alphonse Merrheim, signed by several militants of the federation of teachers' unions including Louis Bouët, Fernand Loriot, Marie Guillot, Marie Mayoux, Marthe Bigot and Hélène Brion. The resolution said "this war is not our war" and laid responsibility on the leaders of the belligerent states. The resolution denounced the union sacrée and called for the restoration of liberty.

A major international conference of pacifists was held in 1915 in Zimmerwald, Switzerland, and another in Kienthal, Switzerland. The French activists were prevented from attending, but kept in contact by letters. They circulated banned publications and attended meetings, sometimes in private apartments to avoid informers. Louis Malvy, Minister of the Interior, received the reports of spies and all the letters addressed to Brion. In 1917, Louise Bodin and Colette Reynaud founded the journal La Voix des femmes, to which the major feminists contributed including Nelly Roussel and Hélène Brion. The first issue of La Voix des Femmes appeared on 31 August 1917. Contributors included men such as Boris Souvarine and Georges Pioch as well as women such as Colette Reynaud.

A police report in 1917 described "the activist Hélène Brion, public school teacher in Pantin, general secretary of the National Federation of public school teachers (Fédération Nationale des instituteurs et institutrices publics), a member of the Committee for the resumption of international relations (Comité pour la reprise des relations internationales) and a member of union defense committee (Comité de défense syndicaliste). Her correspondents included Léon Bronstein-Trotsky, a Russian journalist. Describing a meeting of trade unionists and anarchists the reporter said about 40 women were present, about half of them from the Russian-Polish colony. There were a few from Louise Saumoneau's socialist women and Hélène Brion's teachers, and the rest of the women were militant socialists or French trade unionists.

== Arrest and trial ==
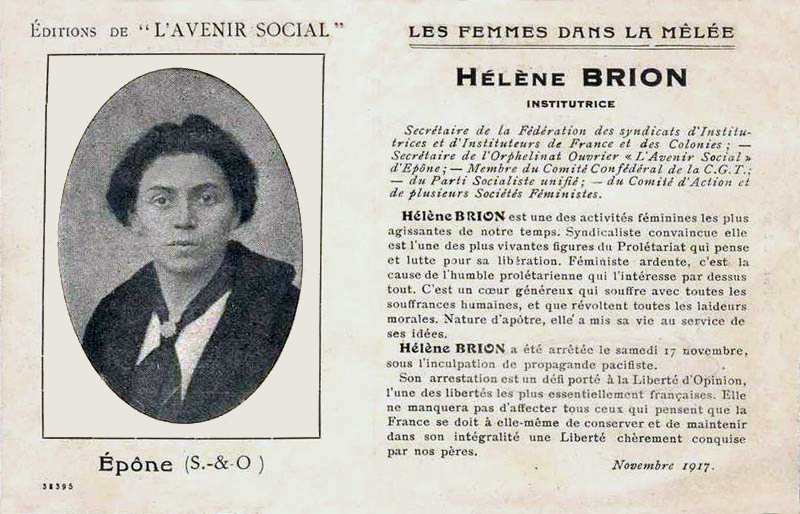
Postcard issued by L'Avenir social after Brion's arrest

Brion's home was searched on 26 July 1917. Little was found apart from some pacifist writings and leaflets. However, her position in the CGT and her militancy made her a natural target. Georges Clemenceau, who would become President of the Council in November 1917, wanted examples. Brion was arrested on 17 November 1917 and sent to the women's prison of Saint Lazare. A smear campaign was started in newspapers such as le Petit Parisien and le Matin. Among other things she was accused of wearing trousers. (Note: The reference to wearing trousers accompanied a photograph of Brion wearing a cycling suit. Masculine clothing at that time was associated with lesbian, subversive, anti-male activities. Brion's friend Madeleine Peletier wore masculine clothes and had her hair cut short, which gave her trouble, particularly during the war. There are in fact hints in her writing that Brion may have been homosexual.) The national syndicalist journalist Émile Janvion published an undated pamphlet, probably in late 1917, titled Le féminisme défaitiste (Defeatist Feminism). He identified pro-peace feminist leaders such as Hélène Brion, Séverine, Marguerite Durand, Hubertine Auclert and Nelly Roussel, and wrote, "the history of defeatism, when it is known, will demonstrate superabundantly that feminism will there merit, I dare say, the place of honor."

Madeleine Vernet organized a defense committee for Hélène Brion, who was secretary of the board of her workers' orphanage L'Avenir social at Épône. Two weeks after Brion had been arrested, Vernet produced a 30-page pamphlet that presented the case as another Dreyfus affair. She wrote, "From this tissue of infamies it came out that Hélène Brion was a dangerous and suspicious character—Anarchist, revolutionary, Malthusian, anti-militarist, defeatist. ... The word spy, which was not directly pronounced, was visible between the lines." Vernet presented a very different picture of a dedicated and generous person devoted to helping children, women and workers. A general assembly of militants was held on 17 December 1917, which issued a manifesto in Brion's favor and raised a subscription.

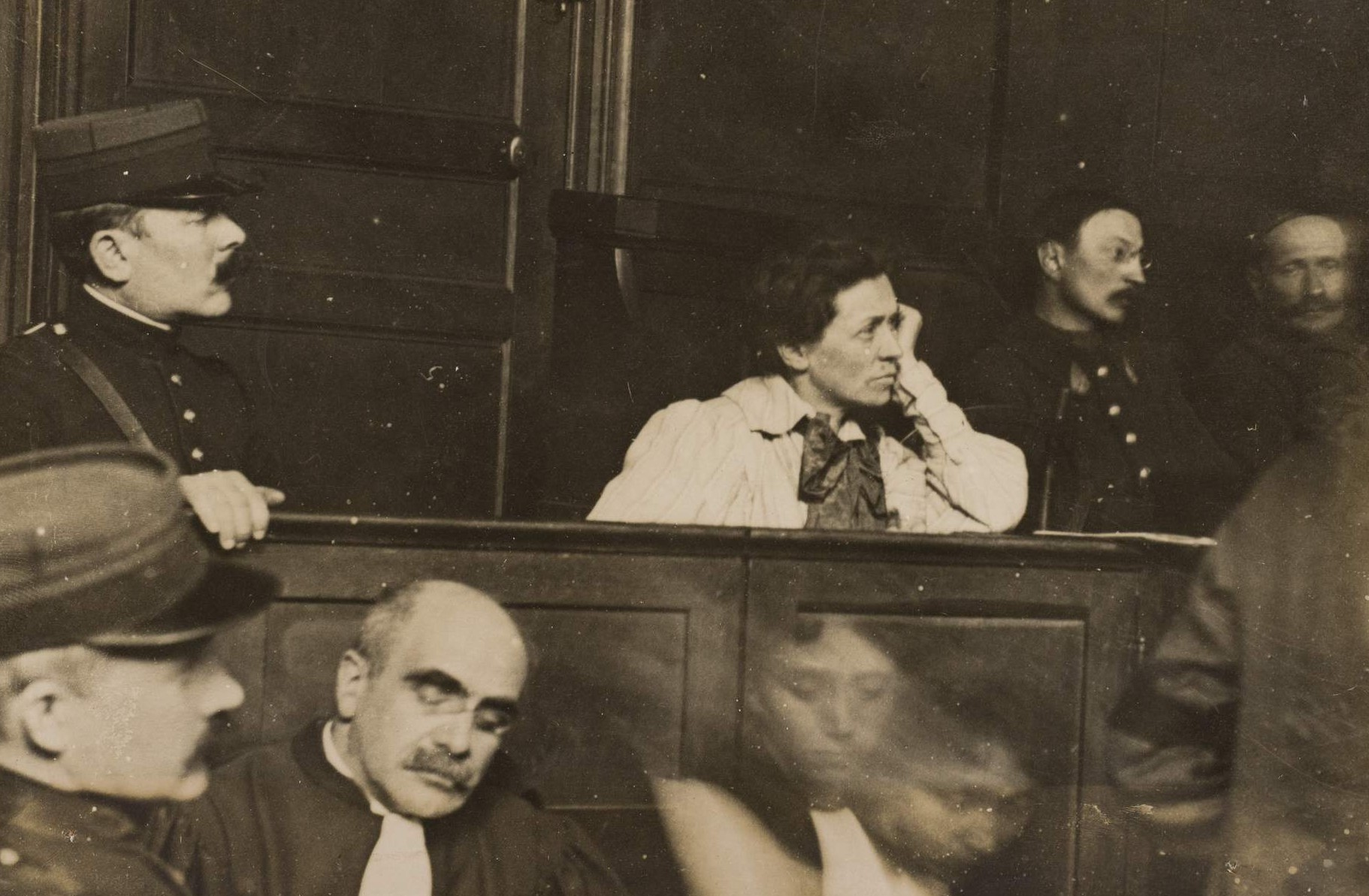
Brion during the trial

Brion was the first woman in France to be tried by a military tribunal during World War I. Her trial became a cause célèbre, reported on the front pages of the national newspapers. The trial took place in March 1918. The charges were based on a law of 5 August 1914 that prohibited publications that would give information to the enemy or would exercise a bad influence on the mind of the army and the people. Brion was co-accused with Mouflard, a soldier who was her godson and was suspected of having circulated pacifist propaganda at the front. The debates lasted several days, and many witnesses were brought for the defense. Character witnesses included Séverine, Jean Longuet, deputy and grandson of Marx, Marthe Bigot, a teacher who said she had distributed the same material as Brion and therefore deserved the same punishment, Nelly Roussel, vice president of the Union fraternelle des femmes and others. The defense stated that the offending leaflets were not illegal and had been openly circulated for a long time without the authorities taking any action. Brion questioned the validity of the trial, saying,

I appear before this court charged with a political crime; yet I am denied all political rights. Because I am a woman, I am classified de plano by my country's laws, far inferior to all the men of France and the colonies. In spite of the intelligence that has been officially recognized only recently, in spite of the certificates and diplomas that were granted me long ago, before the law I am not the equal of an illiterate black from Guadeloupe or the Ivory Coast. For he can participate, by means of the ballor, in directing the affairs of our common country, while I cannot. I am outside the law. The law should be logical and ignore my existence when it comes to punishments, just as it is ignored when it comes to rights...

She went on to say "I am first and foremost a feminist. And it is because of my feminism that I am an enemy of war. ... War represents the triumph of brute strength, while feminism can only triumph through moral strength and intellectual values."

The prosecution said "it pleases me to state that Helene Brion has a generous heart, no one disputes that." But he reminded the court that Brion's actions were to be judged, not her moral character, and insisted that blind pacifism is defeatism. Brion's lawyer asked that if the court found her guilty, it should be lenient: "if she made a mistake, she did it without personal interest, she was mistaken out of goodness, the nobility of her soul." He also said she had "endured four months of harsh imprisonment in St. Lazare, prison of thieves and prostitutes ... she has weathered them courageously, gently. She has now largely expiated the little of wrong that you reproach her with. The outcome was that Mouflard was given a six months suspended sentence and Brion a three years suspended sentence.

== Later years ==
On 31 March 1918, Le Petit Parisien noted that Brion's certificate to teach had been revoked. She worked at the workers' orphanage that she had created with Madeleine Vernet, and was not reinstated as a teacher until 1925 under the Cartel des Gauches. The men returned to the CGT after demobilization and Brion accepted a subordinate place. She launched the review La Lutte Féministe (The Feminist Struggle), which was published for three years. She became increasingly interested in spiritualism.

Around 1920, Brion joined the French Communist Party. She was one of the few Frenchwomen who were able to visit revolutionary Russia in 1919–22, with Madeleine Pelletier and Magdeleine Marx. Records of French travel to Russia are sketchy for the period before 1924 when the French government recognized the regime, and the journeys were often clandestine. Hélène Brion does not seem to have attended the Second Congress of the Comintern in June–July 1920, but arrived before the end of the summer of 1920 and returned to France in late January or early February 1921. As a relatively minor figure, she was somewhat isolated from the main political players and events in Russia, but was able to obtain a brief interview with Lenin in the Kremlin. She made a second visit in 1922 as an active member of the French Committee for assistance to the Russian people, and perhaps a third visit. She recorded her first visit to Russia in a school notebook, along with articles cut out and pasted into the notebook. Although never published, the work had reached a relatively complete stage before being abandoned. Choses et gens de Russie Rouge is a naive work of propaganda. Some passages appeared in La Lutte Féministe and other journals.

Hélène Brion became disillusioned with the lack of interest in feminism among the Russian and French communists. She left public life in the 1920s. She devoted a huge amount of effort to preparing a feminist encyclopedia, never finished. The many boxes of material, including biographical notes, newspaper clippings, postcards, poorly organized and without citations, is held in the Bibliothèque Marguerite Durand. Little is known of Brion's later life. She continued to live in Pantin, and during World War II (1939–45) moved to Vosges, where she continued work on her encyclopedia. A letter survives from November 1944 in which she asks a member of the newly elected Constituent Assembly to support women's rights.

In the winter of 1944–45, Brion wrote a "Letter to Mrs. Roosevelt" in the name of the Femmes de la Libération Nationale (FLN: Women of the National Liberation) of the 12th arrondissement and thanked Eleanor Roosevelt for expressing her admiration of the women of the Resistance. She said she was proud of her fellow citizenesses, who could not be equalled in the war, and that the FLN would work to rebuild the country and establish world peace. For this purpose women as well as men should be represented in the assemblies that defined the statutes of world peace. This appeal to the wife of a political leader was somewhat anachronistic.

Hélène Brion died in Ennery, Val-d'Oise on 31 August 1962 at the age of eighty.

== Sources ==
- Avrane, Colette (2003-06-05). "Hélène Brion, une institutrice féministe". Archives du Féminisme (in French).
- Cœuré, Sophie (2003). "Hélène Brion en " Russie rouge " (1920-1922). "". Le Mouvement Social (in French) (4).
- "Brion, Hélène (1882–1962)". Women in World History: A Biographical Encyclopedia. 2000.
- Chuzeville, Julien (2012). Fernand Loriot: le fondateur oublié du Parti communiste (in French). Harmattan. p. 21. ISBN 978-2-336-00119-7.
- Fell, Alison S. (2009). Femmes Face À la Guerre. Peter Lang. ISBN 978-3-03911-332-3.
- "Fernand Loriot". Communist Bulletin (32–33). July 1933.
- "Fonds Bouglé, sous-fonds Louise Bodin". Archives du Féminisme (in French).
- Grayzel, Susan R. (1999). Women's Identities at War: Gender, Motherhood, and Politics in Britain and France During the First World War. UNC Press Books. ISBN 978-0-8078-4810-4.
- Guéraiche, William (1999-01-01). Les femmes et la République: essai sur la répartition du pouvoir de 1943 à 1979 (in French). Editions de l'Atelier. ISBN 978-2-7082-3468-0.
- Gruber, Helmut; Graves, Pamela M. (1998). Women and Socialism, Socialism and Women: Europe Between the Two World Wars. Berghahn Books. ISBN 978-1-57181-152-3.
- Hollander, Neil (2013-12-27). Elusive Dove: The Search for Peace During World War I. McFarland. ISBN 978-0-7864-7891-0.
- Offen, Karen M. (1983). Women, the Family, and Freedom: 1880-1950. Stanford University Press. p. 273. ISBN 978-0-8047-1173-9.
- Offen, Karen M. (2000). European Feminisms, 1700-1950: A Political History. Stanford University Press. ISBN 978-0-8047-3420-2.
- R.D. (2012-09-13). "VERNET Madeleine [CAVELIER Madeleine, Eugénie, Clémentine, Victorine, dite]". Dictionnaire international des militants anarchistes (in French).
- Schiappa, Jean-Marc (1989). "COSNIER Colette, La bolchevique aux bijoux". Communisme - Révolution Française (in French). L'AGE D'HOMME. ISBN 978-2-8251-3407-8.
