= Henriette Sauret =

- Born: 1890
- Died: 1976
- Occupation: author, poet, journalist, feminist, pacifist, literary critic
- Language: French
- Genre: political articles, poetry
- Subject: anti-war
- Spouse: André Arnyvelde
- Parents: Henry Sébastien Sauret

Henriette Sauret (after marriage, Sauret-Arnyvelde; 1890-1976) was a French feminist author, and feminist pacifist journalist. As a feminist literary critic, her comments were less favorable about other feminist pacifist books than other experienced reviewers.

== Biography ==
Henriette Sauret was born in 1890. Her father was Général Henry Sébastien Sauret. Henriette married the journalist André Arnyvelde.

Sauret was a contributor to Le Dimanche illustré, and La Fronde, as well as a regular political contributor to La Voix des femmes, (Note: See for example, "Préoccupations masculines", La Voix des Femmes, 30 January 1919.)

Her poetry was published in L'œil de veau. In 1918 and again in the following year, Sauret published two volumes of war-related poetry, Les Forces détournées (Diverted Strengths) and L'Amour à la Géhenne (Love in Gehenna), whose theme was the deleterious impact that war has on women.

Along with Jeanne Bouvier and Andre Mariani (Marie-Louise Bouglé's husband), Sauret was associated with the Société des Amis de la Bibliothèque Marie-Louise Bouglé. She was also a member of the French Union for Women's Suffrage. She was referred to as a radical feminist when in 1919, she spoke about bobbed women's hair as "a gesture of independence; a personal endeavor".

Henriette Sauret died in 1976. Erik Satie dedicated his Observations d'un imbécile (Moi) to Sauret.

== Selected works ==
- Je respire, 1913
- Les forces détournées, 1914-1917, 1918
- L'amour à la géhenne : poème, 1919
- Isadora Duncan, impératrice errante, 1928
- Le Laurier de la vallée, 1933
- Une apôtre sociale: Marie-Louise Bouglé, 1938
- Des Roses! Poésie d' Henriette Sauret

== See also ==
- List of peace activists
