= Marthe Bray =

French suffragist (1884–1949)

Martha Bray
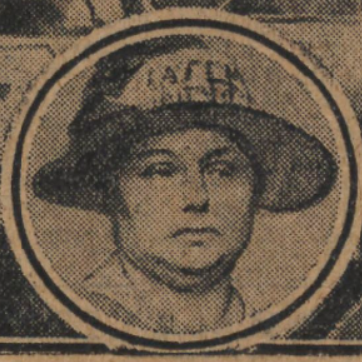
- in 1926 newspaper
- Born: 1884
- Died: 1949 (aged 64–65)

Martha Bray or Martha Bray-Smeets (1884–1949) was a French suffragist who formed the Ligue d'action féminine to influence French opinion in favour of recognising women's right to vote.

== Life ==
Bray was born in 1884. She was an admirer of the women's leader Hubertine Auclert.

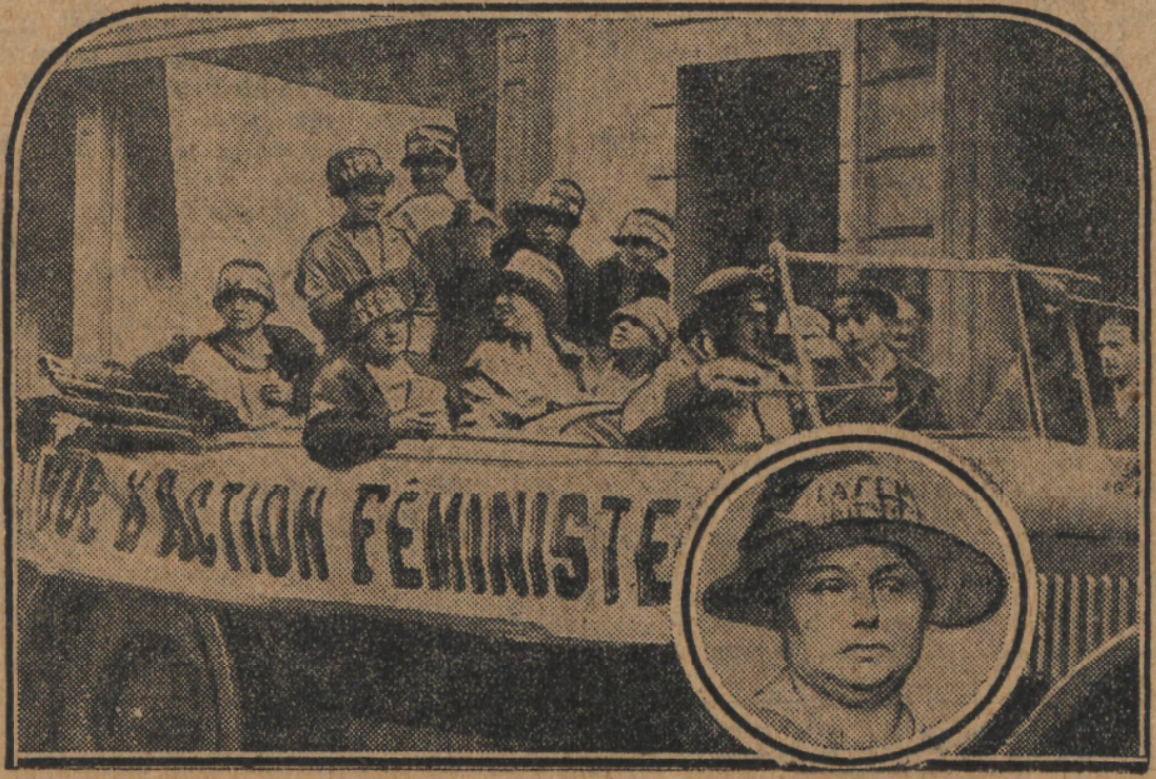
Front-page news in 1926

On 6 December 1925, she created the La Ligue d’action féminine pour le suffrage des femmes to influence French opinion to recognise that French women had the right to vote. She believed that giving women the vote may have been a way to avoid wars. Unlike Britain, France had not rewarded French women with the vote after the war, and the argument for women's suffrage was confused. Was the reason one of "right" or because of the benefits of fighting issues such as temperance, venereal disease or disarmament where there was a traditional women's lobby group.

Bray's organisation used humour to win broad support in different classes. Her organisation is estimated to have had about 500 members. The organisation she had formed was non-militant but Bray was envious of the militant tactics that had been used by the British Women’s Social and Political Union before the first World war. Bray’s organisation was looked on as a role model by the Americans.

On 8 September 1926 they made the front page of the Paris daily newspaper Le Journal with coverage of their campaign and a photo of a car of supporters and a portrait of Bray.
