= Louise Bodin =

French feminist and journalist

- Born: 1877; Paris, France
- Died: 3 February 1929 (aged 51–52); Rennes, France
- Occupation: Feminist

Louise Bodin (1877 – 3 February 1929) was a French feminist and journalist who became a member of the steering committee of the French Communist Party.

== Early years ==
Louise Charlotte Bodin was born in 1877. Her father was a communard, but otherwise nothing in her background predestined her to become a revolutionary. She had a typical education for the period, and married a professor of medicine. Her husband, Eugène Bodin, was head of the faculty of medicine in Rennes, so they were well-to-do. This later earned her the sobriquet la bolchevique aux bijoux (the Bolshevik with jewelry) from her enemies, although her friends called her La bonne Louise (Good Louise).

Rennes was a rough city at the turn of the century where alcoholism was endemic, there was no money for a girls' school, and the municipal council openly complained about the shortage of brothels. The second Dreyfus Trial was held in Rennes in 1899, and this profoundly affected Bodin. In March 1913 several women and a few men founded a local group of the French Union for Universal Suffrage, of which Bodin soon became president for Ille-et-Vilaine. In June 1913 she took her manuscript Les Petites Provinciales to Paris seeking a publisher, and was rejected by many reviews.

== Socialist and feminist ==
World War I (1914–18) caused Bodin became more aware of the class struggle. She was a convinced pacifist during the war. Socialism, pacifism and feminism became closely linked in her thinking. She noted that the Russian Revolution was hated because it had affected the sacred caste. In 1917, she and Colette Reynaud founded the journal La Voix des femmes, to which the major feminists contributed including Nelly Roussel and Hélène Brion. The journal appeared weekly, and presented socialist feminist viewpoints. The first issue of La Voix des Femmes appeared on 31 August 1917. Contributors included men such as Boris Souvarine and Georges Pioch as well as women such as Colette Reynaud. Bodin organized a series of conferences. She contributed to journals such as la Vie Ouvrière, l'Humanité and Populaire among others.

Bodin was a strong supporter of women's role as mothers, although she did not agree with the objectives of the maternalist movement. When Madeleine Vernet founded the monthly La mère éducatrice in 1917, Bodin congratulated her and wrote, "At the very dawn of life, there is mother and child, and, in a society not lost to egoism, vice and crime, everything should contribute to the veneration of the mother and child." However, in 1919 she derided the Union française pour la suffrage des femmes (French Union for Women's Suffrage) and its wealthy leader Cécile Brunschvicg (1877–1946), who said it was easy to have a child and feminists should convince working-class women to have more.

In 1919, she wrote against the right of nuns to teach girls, since they had chosen to withdraw from modern life with its needs and struggles. She campaigned against the anti-abortion law of 1920. In 1920, the government of France banned material that gave information about abortion or contraception and made it illegal to sell materials or instruments that could be used for abortions. Louise Bodin commented in L'Humanité (9 August 1920), "The social prison of woman has been furnished with one more bar; such is the justice of men."

== Communist ==
In the autumn of 1920, Bodin adhered to the Third International. She subordinated feminism to the proletarian revolution. Madeleine Pelletier became an editor of the La Voix des Femmes in 1920. As editor-in-chief, Louise Bodin wrote on the front page on 13 January 1921 that the Congress of Tours had laid out the route forward after the first Russian Revolution. After deep disagreements with Madeleine Pelletier, Bodin resigned from La Voix des femmes. She founded Le Journal des femmes communistes.

Bodin edited the party's La Voix communiste, published in Rennes, until 1923, when it merged with the Brest-based Germinal to become La Bretagne communiste. L'Ouvrière was launched in 1922. It was a new communist weekly in collaboration with La Voix communiste. Bodin was an editor. In an article on prostitution and prostitutes published in l'Ouvrière on 15 April 1925, Bodin denounced the hypocrisy of giving men and women unequal access to sex education. She noted sarcastically "Men affect to leave women ignorant of the acts of sexual love for the fulfillment of which, however, they require the collaboration, acquiescence or submission of women ... The woman does not need to know what is being done with her. This does not concern her." (Note: "les hommes affectent de laisser les femmes dans l'ignorance des gestes de l'amour sexuel pour l'accomplissement desquels, cependant, il faut tour au moins la collaboration, l'acquiescement ou la soumission des femmes ... La femme n'a pas besoin de savoir ce que l'on fait avec elle. Cela ne le regarde pas.")

Bodin was secretary of the Communist Federation of Ille-et-Vilaine, and was elected to the steering committee of the Communist party at the Marseilles congress in December 1921. Apart from Bodin and Marthe Bigot, most of the committee was male. Bodin directed the federation of Ille-de-Vilaine from 1921–24, when her health broke down and she was replaced by Marcel Sevestre. A supporter of the left opposition, and opposed to the exclusion of Leon Trotsky, she broke with the French Communist Party in November 1927. She died on 3 February 1929 after a year of agony.

== Works ==
- Les Petites Provinciales, 1914.
- Le n° 2 de la série Les Cahiers bretons, intitulé En Bretagne. Des livres. Des voyages. Des impressions. Des opinions., 1918
- Au pays des Repopulateurs, 1922
- Le Drame politique du Congrès de Paris (n.d.)

== Sources ==
- Accampo, Elinor (2010-09-01). Blessed Motherhood, Bitter Fruit: Nelly Roussel and the Politics of Female Pain in Third Republic France. JHU Press. ISBN 978-0-8018-8896-0.
- Bougeard, Christian (1999). La Bretagne d'une guerre à l'autre: 1914-1945. Editions Jean-paul Gisserot. ISBN 978-2-87747-431-3.
- Drost, Julia (2003). La Garçonne: Wandlungen einer literarischen Figur. Wallstein Verlag. ISBN 978-3-89244-681-1.
- "Fonds Bouglé, sous-fonds Louise Bodin". Archives du féminisme.
- "Louise Bodin". Révolution. 2013-11-16.
- Louis, Marie-Victoire (1994). Le droit de cuissage: France, 1860-1930. Editions de l'Atelier. ISBN 978-2-7082-3062-0.
- Maignien, Claude; Sowerwine, Charles (1992). Madeleine Pelletier, une féministe dans l'arène politique. Editions de l'Atelier. ISBN 978-2-7082-2960-0.
- Offen, Karen M. (2000). European Feminisms, 1700-1950: A Political History. Stanford University Press. ISBN 978-0-8047-3420-2.
- Roberts, Mary Louise (2009-02-15). Civilization without Sexes: Reconstructing Gender in Postwar France, 1917-1927. University of Chicago Press. ISBN 978-0-226-72127-9.
- Schiappa, Jean-Marc (1989). "COSNIER Colette, La bolchevique aux bijoux". Communisme - Révolution Française. L'AGE D'HOMME. ISBN 978-2-8251-3407-8.
- Wohl, Robert (1966-01-01). French Communism in the Making, 1914-1924. Stanford University Press. p. 256. ISBN 978-0-8047-0177-8.
