= Colette Reynaud =

French feminist, socialist and journalist

- Born: 1872
- Died: 1965 (aged 92–93)
- Occupations: feminist, socialist and pacifist journalist
- Notable work: co-founder and director of the weekly newspaper La Voix des femmes

Colette Reynaud (1872–1965) was a French feminist, socialist and pacifist journalist. In 1917, she was the co-founder and director of the weekly newspaper La Voix des femmes (Women's voice).

== Career ==
Together with Louise Bodin, Reynaud founded the newspaper La Voix des femmes on October 31, 1917, to promote women's right to vote. Reynaud managed the newspaper while Bodin assumed the role of editor-in-chief, attracting the participation of celebrities such as Séverine, Madeleine Pelletier, Hélène Brion, Henri Barbusse, and Marcel Cachin. The newspaper was launched in the middle of the World War I in a context of repression, symbolized in November 1917 by the arrest of the teacher Hélène Brion, accused of defeatist propaganda.

From December 1, 1922, Reynaud attempted to publish the newspaper on a daily basis, with Noëlie Drous as editor-in-chief, but quickly gave up such frequency. It continued to appear until 1937. In 1930, Marguerite Durand referred to Reynaud as one of the "remarkable professionals" of women's journalism of her day, noting that she kept more to a management than to an editorial role.

The historian of socialism, Julien Chuzeville, thought that Reynaud was probably a member of the French Section of the Workers' International (SFIO) when she joined the committee of the Third Communist International, adding that she undoubtedly was a member of the French Communist Party when it split in 1920. In October 1920, Reynaud also joined the Action Committee for the release of imprisoned militants, notably Fernand Loriot, Boris Souvarine, and Pierre Monatte.

After the war, Reynaud became a member of the committee of the French branch of the Women's League Against War, then served as secretary of the Union populaire pour la paix universelle (People's Union for Universal Peace). In 1926, she co-founded the Ligue d’action féminine (Women's Action League) to push for the immediate acceptance of women's suffrage under the leadership of Marthe Bray.

== Personal life ==
A Freemason, Reynaud was a member of the lodge Le Droit Humain, and of the fraternal association of journalists, where she associated with Camille Chautemps, Marcel Huart, Aristide Quillet, and Alexandre Varenne.

Married to a doctor, Reynaud was the mother of two children.
