= Madeleine Pelletier =

French physician, psychiatrist, feminist, socialist, editor (1874–1939)

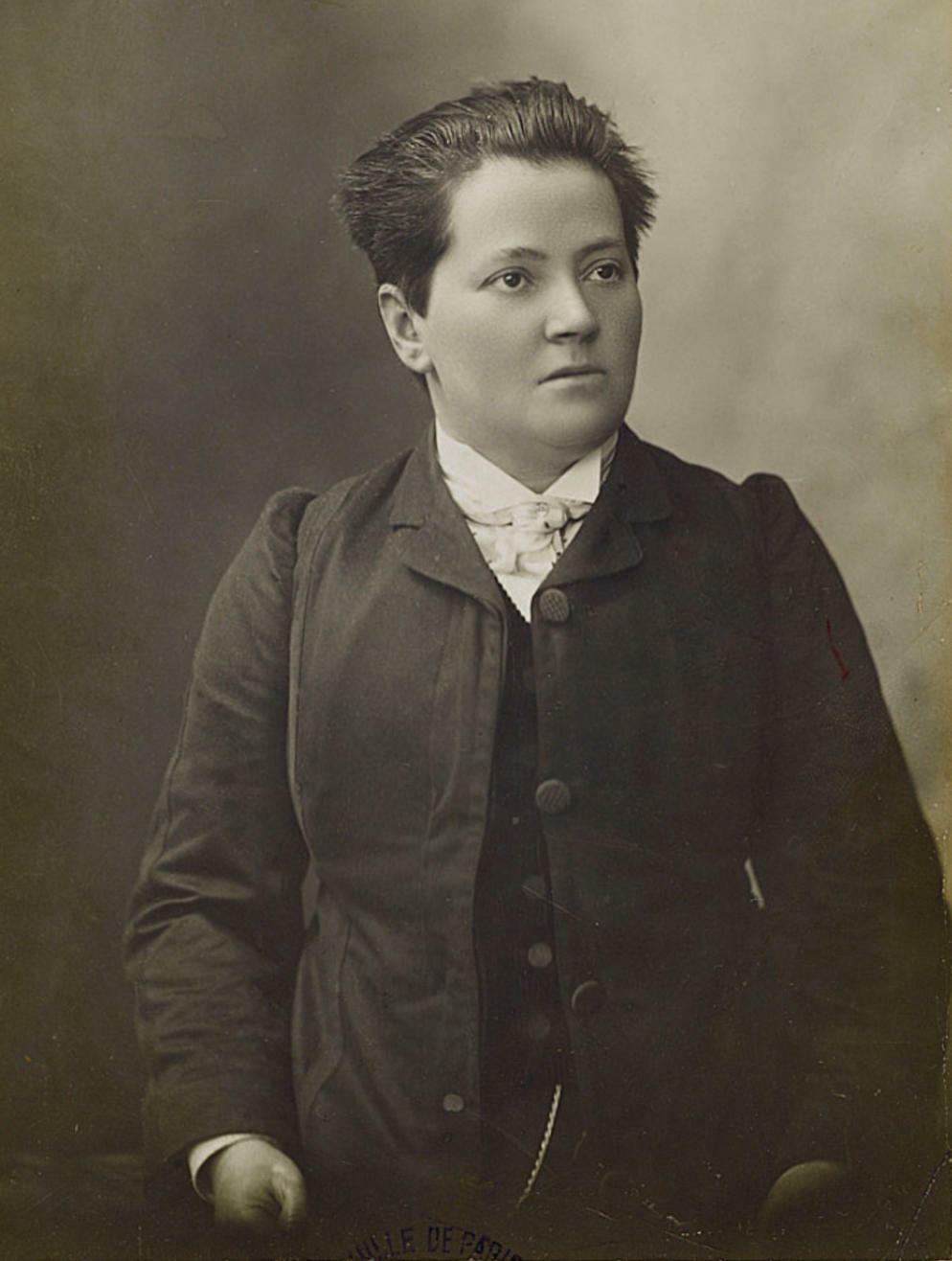
- Born: Anne Pelletier; 18 May 1874; Paris, France
- Died: 29 December 1939 (aged 65); Épinay-sur-Orge, France
- Education: University of Paris
- Known for: Women's rights
- Scientific career
- Fields: Physician, psychiatrist

Madeleine Pelletier (French: [pɛltje]; born Anne Pelletier; 18 May 1874 – 29 December 1939) was a French psychiatrist, first-wave feminist, and political activist. Born in Paris, Pelletier frequented socialist and anarchist groups in her adolescence. She became a doctor in her twenties, overcoming a large educational gap, and was France's first woman to receive a doctorate in psychiatry. Pelletier joined freemasonry, the French Section of the Workers' International, and came to lead a feminist association. She set out to join the October Revolution but returned disillusioned. In France, she continued to advocate for feminist and communist causes, and wrote numerous articles, essays, and literary works, even following a stroke in 1937 which made her hemiplegic. Pelletier was charged with having performed an abortion in 1939 despite her condition precluding her ability to perform this act. She was placed in a mental asylum where her health deteriorated and she died of a second stroke later that year.

== Biography ==
Pelletier originally trained as an anthropologist studying the relationship between skull size and intelligence after Paul Broca with Charles Letourneau and Léonce Manouvrier. When she left anthropology she attacked the concept of skull size as a determinant of intelligence distinguishing the sexes.

Following her break with anthropology Pelletier went on to become a psychiatrist. In 1903, Pelletier conducted a campaign with the support of the feminist newspaper La Fronde to support the eligibility of women for all types of medical specialisation, most relevantly to the examination for psychiatric internships.

She was also notable as a female Freemason. Pelletier was a member of the La Nouvelle Jérusalem lodge, becoming a member in 1904. The lodge had both male and female members, and, although politically active, she was often at odds with her lodge in her efforts to promote the emancipation of women.

A staunch feminist, Pelletier fought for women's suffage and abortion. In July 1906, she and other suffragists, including Caroline Kauffmann, invaded the French Chamber of Deputies and showered down from the gallery pink slips of paper containing an appeal for the right to vote.

Pelletier was partially paralyzed by a stroke in 1937. However, she continued to openly practice abortion, and was arrested in 1939. Following her arrest she was interned in an asylum (Perray-Vaucluse Asylum in Épinay-sur-Orge) and her physical and mental health deteriorated. She died within the year.

== Gallery ==
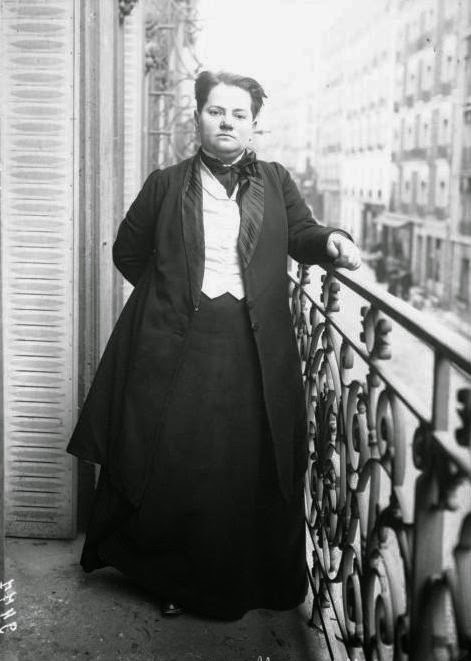
Pelletier in 1910 for Agence Rol

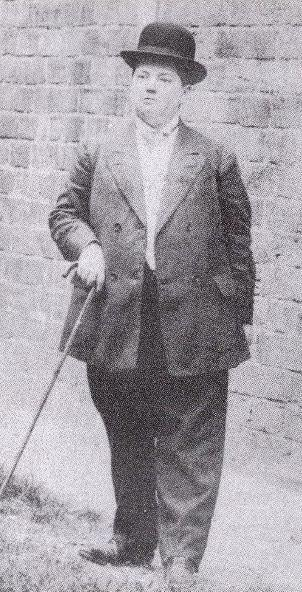
Pelletier dressed like a man to distance herself from femininity, a concept that she saw as a sign of the oppression of women.

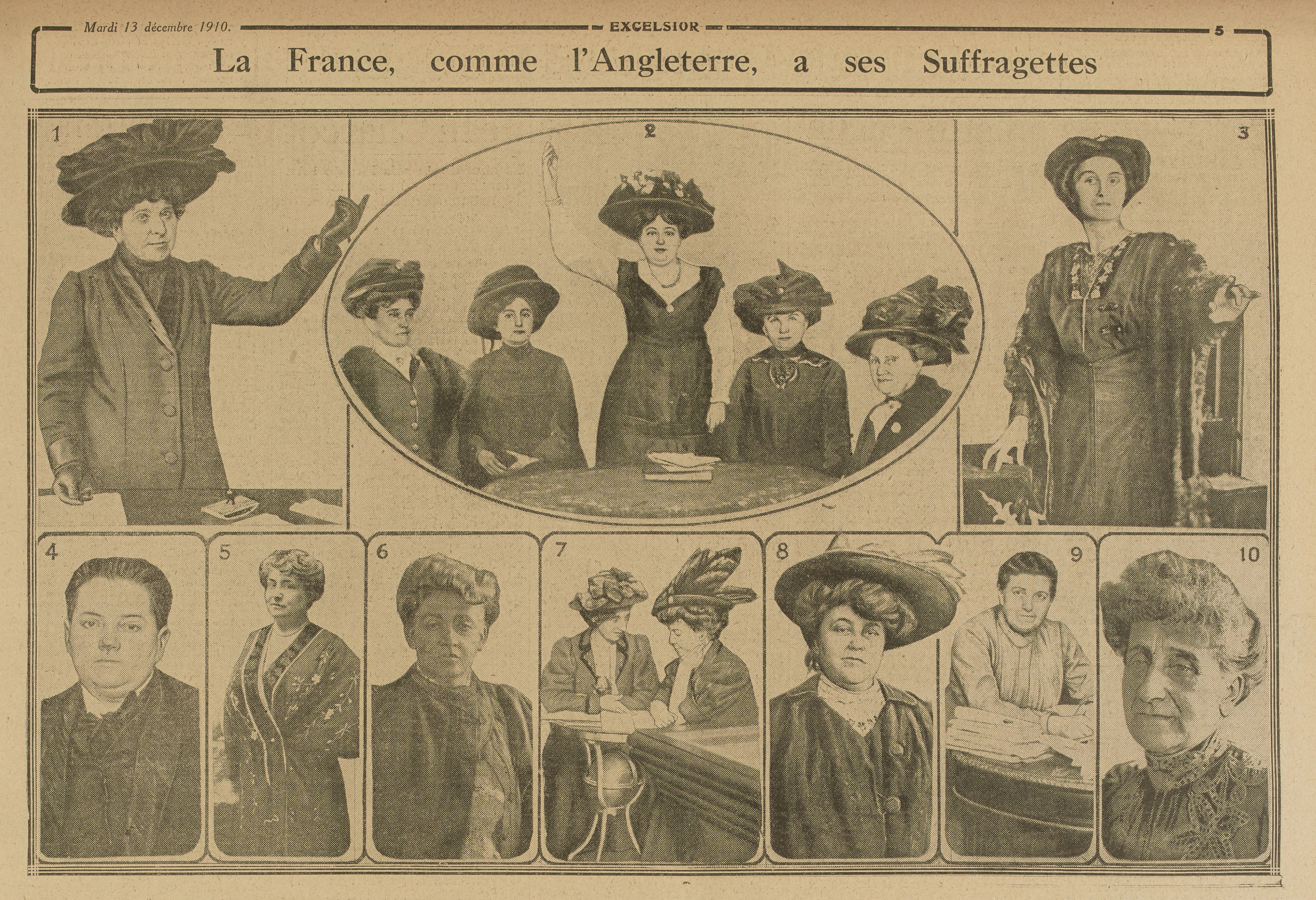
France, like England, has its Suffragettes Excelsior, December 13, 1910

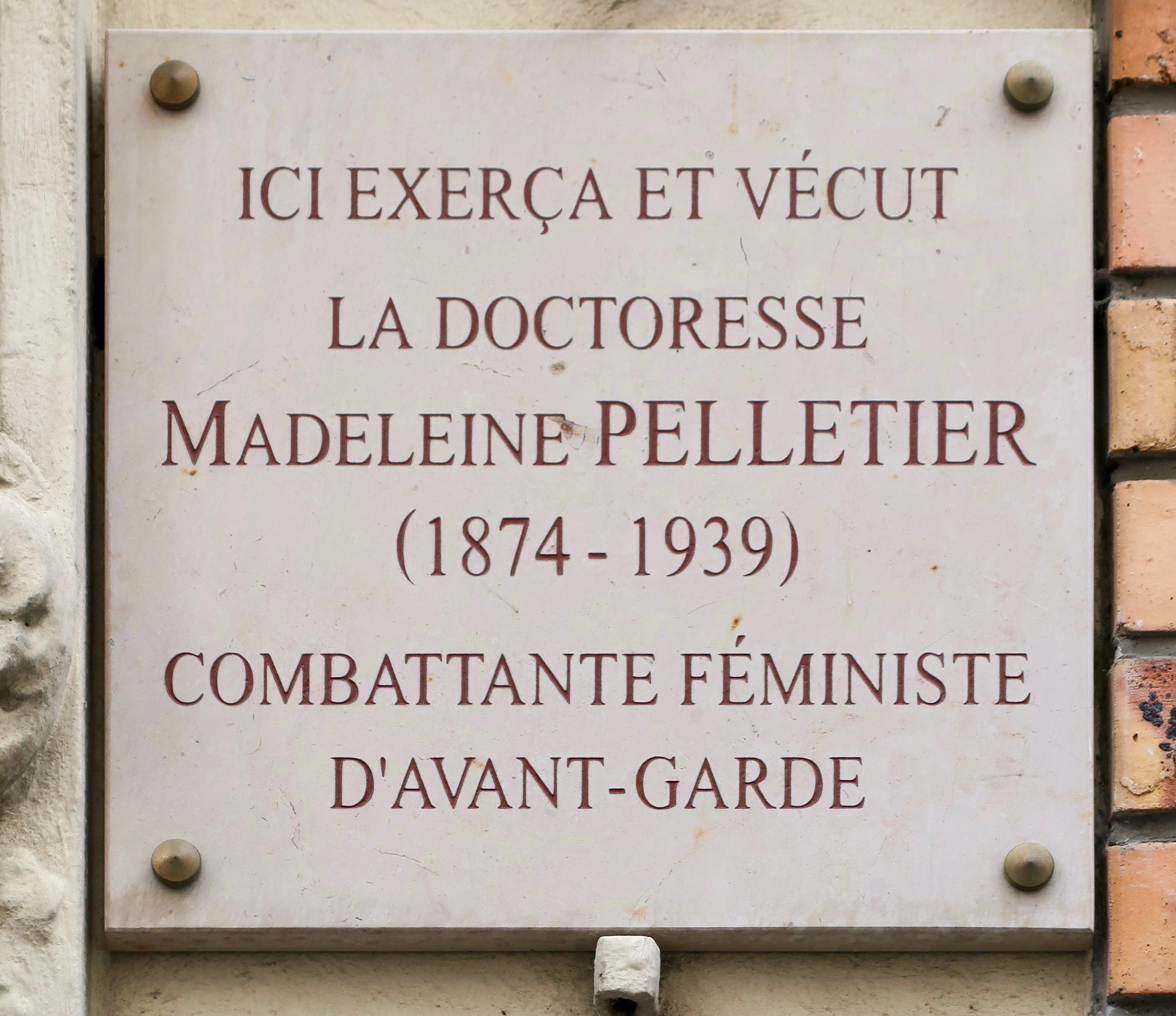
Plaque honoring Pelletier in 80-82 rue de Gergovie, Paris

== Works ==
L’Association des idées dans la manie aiguë et dans la débilité mentale (1903). Doctoral thesis.

- Les lois morbides de l'association des idées, Jean Rousset, 1904
- La Femme en lutte pour ses droits, V. Giard et E. Brière, Paris, 1908
- Dieu, la morale, la patrie, V. Giard et E. Brière, Paris, 1910
- Philosophie sociale: Les opinions, les partis, les classes, V. Giard et E. Brière, Paris, 1912
- Le Droit à l’avortement, Éditions du Malthusien, Paris, 1913
- La question du vote des femmes, 1919
- Oeuvres diverses, Marcel Giard, Paris, 1922
- Mon voyage aventureux en Russie communiste, Marcel Giard, Paris, 1922
- La Guerre est-elle naturelle suivi de Le Droit au travail pour la femme, La Brochure mensuelle, Paris, 1931
- Une vie nouvelle, Eugène Figuière, 1932
- La Femme vierge, 1933

== See also ==
- History of feminism
- List of suffragists and suffragettes
- Women's suffrage

== Sources ==
- Allen, C. S. (2003). "Sisters of Another Sort: Freemason Women in Modern France, 1725–1940". The Journal of Modern History, 75: 783–835.
- Gordon, F. (1990). The Integral Feminist, Madeleine Pelletier, 1874 – 1939, Feminism, Socialism and Medicine. Polity Press
- Sowerwine, C. (1991). "Activism and Sexual Identity – the Life and Words of Pelletier, Madeleine (1874–1939)". Mouvement Social, 157: 9–32.
- Sowerwine, C. (2003). "Woman’s Brain, Man’s Brain: feminism and anthropology in late nineteenth-century France". Women’s History Review, 12:289–307.
- Felicia Gordon, "Convergence and conflict: anthropology, psychiatry and feminism in the early writings of Madeleine Pelletier (1874—1939)," History of Psychiatry, 19,2 (2008), 141–162.
