= Pierre Brizon =

French teacher, national deputy, internationalist and pacifist

- Born: 16 May 1878; Franchesse, Allier, France
- Died: 1 August 1923 (aged 45); Paris, France
- Occupations: Teacher, politician
- Known for: Pacifism

Pierre Brizon (16 May 1878 – 1 August 1923) was a French teacher, national deputy, internationalist and pacifist. He was subject to violent attacks in the press and parliament for speaking out against the fighting during World War I.

== Early career ==
Pierre Brizon was born on 16 May 1878 in Franchesse, Allier, to a poor farming family. He was a gifted student, and qualified as a teacher, moving from one teaching position to another at the start of his career. He became a teacher of the national professional schools, and was appointed to a position in Armentières, Nord department. There he joined the Socialist group. He supported the struggles of workers, and wrote various articles for socialist publications. In 1905 he wrote in praise of the sailors of the Battleship Potemkin uprising, and received a letter from Bienvenu Martin, minister of public education, reproving him for not having used the reserved language required of public servants, and particularly of teachers. Around this time he also wrote a lengthy history of labor.

He became a teacher at the Rennes industrial school. In the legislative elections of 1906 he was a candidate in Grenoble on the platform of the Socialist Party (SFIO, Section Française de l'Internationale Ouvrière). He was not elected, perhaps because he had no ties to the region. In 1907 he was elected a councilor in the district of Bourbon-l'Archambault, Allier. Later he would become mayor of his native town.

== National deputy ==
Brizon was elected a national deputy for Allier in April 1910 on the socialist platform. He demanded pensions for workers, nationalization of insurance, mines, railways and progressive inheritance and income taxes. He was reelected in 1914. He was noted for his defense of the rights of tenant farmers. After the outbreak of World War I (July 1914 - November 1918) Brizon joined the union sacrée whose members agreed to cooperate with the government, as did all members of the Socialist party. Later he became opposed to the union sacrée, and joined the pacifist Comité pour la reprise des relations internationales (Committee for restoring international relations).

An international socialist conference at Kienthal in Switzerland was arranged for the end of April 1916, a follow-up to the 1915 Zimmerwald Conference. The Confédération générale du travail (CGT, General Confederation of Labor) leaders Alphonse Merrheim, Albert Bourderon and Marie Mayoux were expected to represent France, but were refused the passports they needed to travel. Three delegates from the SFIO led by Alexandre Blanc were able to attend as deputies with parliamentary immunity. Brizon and Jean Raffin-Dugens accompanied Blanc. All three were teachers by profession. At the meeting, Brizon would not accept that the goal should be creation of a third International. He said the important thing was to press the International Socialist Bureau to work towards peace.

On their return from Switzerland, the three deputies were the targets of a violent press campaign in which they were accused of being defeatists, traitors and spies. They were repudiated by leaders of the Socialist party. On 24 June 1916 Brizon, Blanc and Raffins-Dugens refused to vote for war credits. In his speech on that occasion Brizon paid tribute to the "brave minority of German socialists". He said they and he remained faithful to the old decisions of the socialist international, that if war broke out it was the duty of the working classes to try to end it quickly.

For his outspoken opposition to the war Brizon was temporarily suspended from parliament in 1916. After returning to his seat as deputy, he held to his position and asked for a referendum by secret ballot on the question of war or peace. He also asked for an inquiry into the position the government had taken regarding sending delegates to the Third Zimmerwald Conference, held in 1917 in Stockholm. In February 1917 the Committee for the Resumption of International Relations split, with Brizon, Raffin-Dugens and Bourderon joining the SFIO minority led by Jean Longuet, while the socialists Fernand Loriot, Charles Rappoport, Louise Saumoneau and François Mayoux took control of the committee. Merrheim withdrew to concentrate on union work. Brizon launched the pacifist La Vague (The Wave) in January 1918. He had to give up this journal, but later published the Bloc des rouges (Red bloc).

== Later career ==
Bizon failed to be reelected in the national elections of 16 November 1919, where he ran as a socialist. The next month he ran for election as mayor of Franchesse, Allier, but again lost. He joined the French Communist Party when it was created in December 1920 at the Tours Congress, but was expelled in October 1922. He was accused of "right-wing deviation." On 24 December 1922 he and other Communist party dissidents in revolt against Moscow founded the Union fédérative socialiste (Federal Socialist Union). He became a member of the Central Committee and the Political Committee.

Brizon died prematurely in Paris on 1 August 1923. He was aged forty-five.

== See also ==
- Opposition to World War I
- Pacifism during World War I
- List of peace activists

== Bibliography ==
- Brizon, Pierre (1904). L'Église et la Révolution française: des Cahiers de 1789 au Concordat. Pages libres.
- Pierre Brizon (1926). Histoire Du Travail Et Des Travailleurs ... Ed. de l'Églantine (4th ed. 1926).
- Brizon, Pierre (1909). L'apprentissage, hier-aujourd'hui-demain. Pages libres.
- Brizon, Pierre; Compère-Morel, Adéodat Constant Adolphe; Poisson, Ernest (1913). La coopération. Quillet.
- Brizon, Pierre; Poisson, Ernest (1913). Le mouvement socialiste international. Quillet.
- Pierre Brizon. Le blé rouge. Librairie du "Combat de l'Allier.

== Sources ==
- Chuzeville, Julien (2012). Fernand Loriot: le fondateur oublié du Parti communiste (in French). Harmattan. p. 21. ISBN 978-2-336-00119-7.
- "Déclaration du Citoyen Brizon. Chambre des Députés (Séance de 24 Juin 1916)". Dormir Jamais (in French).
- Dubois, Jean-Pierre (24 September 2012). "Guerre à la guerre : Pierre Brizon (1878-1923)". Le Petit Blanquiste (in French). Archived from the original on 28 November 2012.
- Jolly, Jean (1977). "Pierre BRIZON". Dictionnaire des parlementaires français de 1889 à 1940.
- Nation, R. Craig (1989-10-12). War on War: Lenin, the Zimmerwald Left, and the Origins of Communist Internationalism. Duke University Press. ISBN 978-0-8223-8156-3.
- Wohl, Robert (1966-01-01). French Communism in the Making, 1914-1924. Stanford University Press. p. 149. ISBN 978-0-8047-0177-8.
- Ysmal, Pierre (3 June 2004). "Brizon (1878-1923)". L'Humanité (in French).
