= Albert Bourderon =

French cooper (barrel maker) and syndicalist

Albert Henri Bourderon
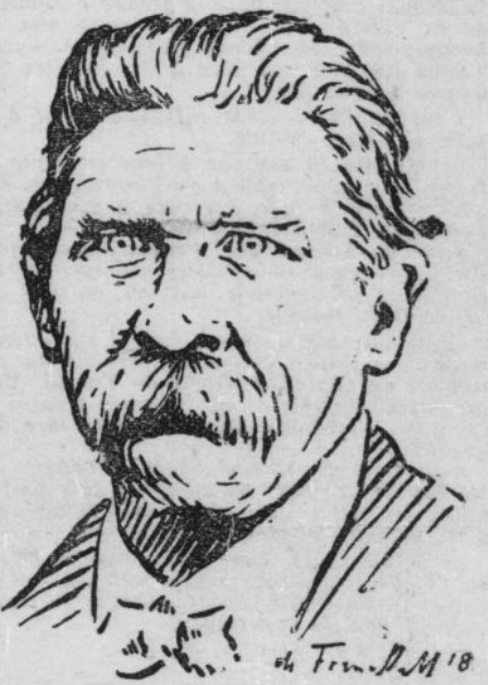
- Born: 26 November 1858; Corbeilles-en-Gâtinais, Loiret, France
- Died: 2 April 1930 (aged 71); Paris, France
- Occupation: Cooper
- Known for: Pacifism

Albert Henri Bourderon (26 November 1858 – 2 April 1930) was a French cooper (barrel maker) and syndicalist who became a leading socialist. During World War I he supported a pacifist position in line with internationalist principles.

== Early years ==
Albert Bourderon was born on 26 November 1858 in Corbeilles-en-Gâtinais, Loiret. He became a cooper (barrel maker) by trade. In the 1890s he became a disciple of the radical syndicalist pioneer Jean Allemane. In 1903 he founded the coopers unions (Fédération du Tonneau). He became secretary of the union. In 1905 he was a participant in the conference where the socialist party (Section Française de l'Internationale Ouvrière, SFIO) was born. He became a member of the central committee of the General Confederation of Labour (Confédération générale du travail, CGT). Bourderon and others with Allemanist or Blanquist backgrounds differed from the anarchists in seeing syndicalism and political socialism as complementary, trying to reach the same basic goal through economic and political means.

== World War I ==
On 15 August 1915 a pacifist resolution was presented at the CGT's national congress at the initiative of Bourderon and Alphonse Merrheim, signed by several militants of the federation of teachers' unions including Louis Bouët, Fernand Loriot, Louis Lafosse, Marie Guillot, Marie Mayoux, Marthe Bigot and Hélène Brion. The resolution said, "this war is not our war" and laid responsibility on the leaders of the belligerent states. The resolution denounced the union sacrée and called for the restoration of liberty.

The conference at Zimmerwald in Switzerland was held from 5–8 September 1915, organized by the Italian socialist party, which was opposed to the war. Merrheim and Bourderon, both secretaries of federations within the CGT, represented the French pacifists. The conference published an appeal, mostly drawn up by Trotsky and the Swiss socialist Robert Grimm, that called for reestablishment of peace between the peoples, calling on the workers of Europe to fight for peace without annexations or indemnities. They should fight for liberty, for the fraternity of peoples, for socialism. Bourderon and Merrheim arranged for 10,000 copies of a pamphlet about the conference to be published by the Federation of metalworkers.

The International Action Committee (Comité d'action internationale, CAI) was founded in December 1915 by French syndicalists who supported the pacifist declarations of the Zimmerwald Conference. In 1916 this was merged with the Socialist Minority Committee to form the Committee for the Resumption of International Relations (Comité pour la réprise des rélations internationales, CRRI). It was led by Bourderon representing the socialists and Merrheim for the syndicalists. Bourderon proposed a manifesto supported by Louise Saumoneau which said the Committee would function "until the party majority and the International Socialist Bureau resume international relations."

A new international socialist conference at Kienthal was arranged by the Swiss for the end of April 1916. Merrheim, Bourderon and Marie Mayoux of the teacher's federation were expected to represent France, but they were refused the passports they needed to travel. Three delegates from the SFIO led by Alexandre Blanc were able to attend, since they were deputies and had parliamentary immunity. In December 1916, at the CGT's second national conference in Paris, Bourderon and Jean Raffin-Dugens broke ranks with the Zimmerwaldians. They voted with the SFIO minority in favor of accepting U.S. President Woodrow Wilson's offer to mediate peace. In February 1917 the CRRI split, with Pierre Brizon, Raffin-Dugens and Bourderon joining the SFIO minority led by Jean Longuet, while the socialists Fernand Loriot, Charles Rappoport, Louise Saumoneau and François Mayoux took control of the committee.

== Post-war ==
After World War I Bourderon evolved towards reformism. Albert Bourderon died in Paris on 2 April 1930 aged 71.

== See also ==
- List of peace activists
