= Louis Bouët =

French teacher and anarcho-syndicalist

- Born: 6 April 1880; Montfaucon-sur-Moine, Maine-et-Loire, France
- Died: 9 July 1969 (aged 89); Saumur, Maine-et-Loire, France
- Occupation: Teacher
- Known for: Militant syndicalism

Louis Bouët (6 April 1880 - 9 July 1969) was a French teacher and anarcho-syndicalist. He played a leading role in the National Federation of Teachers' Unions and in the socialist party. He was briefly a member of the steering committee of the French Communist Party. For many years he edited the pedagogical review L'Ecole Emancipée (The Emancipated School), which he had founded.

== Early years ==
Louis Bouët was born on 6 April 1880 in Montfaucon-sur-Moine, Maine-et-Loire, 20 kilometres (12 mi) from Cholet. His father was a shoemaker and café operator, with little money and less faith. A great uncle in the church offered to pay his fees if he entered the minor seminary to become a priest, but Bouët was not a believer and wanted to become a teacher. He managed to gain admission in 1897 to the École normale in Angers. He was influenced by the headmaster who was a socialist and supporter of Dreyfus.

After leaving school Bouët was assigned to Trélazé and then Saumur, where he stayed for two years before being called up for military service. While at Saumur he spent time with Émile Masson who told him about libertarian doctrines. He met Gabrielle Dechezelles, an accountant in a wholesale grocery, and helped her prepare for her Brevet élémentaire examination. With a small inheritance he was able to return to college and earn his Brevet supérieur. He married Gabrielle and they were to have three children.

== Union activist ==
In 1905 the Louis Bouët signed the manifesto of the teachers' union. Bouët joined the socialist party, the Section Française de l'Internationale Ouvrière (SFIO) in 1906. His revolutionary syndicalist views did not prevent Bouet from joining the socialist party, where he often defended "Hervéiste" concepts. In 1908 the Maine-et-Loire teachers' syndicate, led by Louis Bouët, advocated the organization of joint conferences of civil servants and workers. This had been explicitly forbidden, and charges were laid against the leaders. Bouët revived the revolutionary spirit of the Federation of Teachers' Unions when he launched the pedagogical review L'Ecole Emancipée (The Emancipated School) in 1910.

After the congress of Chambéry in 1912 Bouët drew up the manifesto of unionized teachers. In 1913 the existence of the syndicate was threatened by the government. World War I (July 1914 - November 1918) caused many socialists to abandon their internationalist principles and accept the patriotic cause. Bouët stood firm to his principles. On 15 August 1915 a pacifist resolution was presented at the CGT's national congress at the initiative of Alphonse Merrheim and Albert Bourderon, signed by several militants of the federation of teachers' unions including Bouet, Fernand Loriot, Louis Lafosse, Marie Guillot, Marie Mayoux, Marthe Bigot and Hélène Brion. The resolution said "this war is not our war" and laid responsibility on the leaders of the belligerent states. The resolution denounced the union sacrée and called for the restoration of liberty.

In the period immediately after the war Bouët played a decisive role in the teachers' federation. At the congress of the National Federation of Teachers' Unions in August 1919 the organization took the name Fédération des Membres de l'Enseignement Laïque (FMEL: Federation of Lay Teachers)', since it was in favor of a single union for all types of teachers. Bouet was designated secretary general. He laid the foundations for an International of Education. Due to his union activities, Louis Bouët and his wife were dismissed from their teaching jobs from 8 August 1920 to 1925. Bouët represented Maine-et-Loire at the 3rd International's congress at Tours in December 1920. He confirmed his syndicalist views, and would not accept that one organization should be subject to another. Leon Trotsky, whom he had met in August 1916, encouraged him to accept a leadership position in the communist party. At the December 1921 congress in Marseille he was appointed to the steering committee, but he resigned on 8 February 1922.

== Journalist ==
From April 1922 to 1936 Bouët was in charge of the l'École Émancipée. The Politburo decided to offer Bouët a position as general secretary of l'Humanité in April 1924 after Alfred Rosmer had resigned, but it seems that he turned the position down. Bouet privately expressed doubts about the legitimacy of the Communist party given the evolution of Russia under Stalin, and devoted himself to editing l'École Émancipée.

Louis Bouët left the Communist party around 1927. In 1930 he joined the Cercle Communiste Démocratique (Democratic Communist Circle) of Boris Souvarine. During World War II (1939 - 1945), in June 1940 Louis Bouët was arrested and interned in the Dordogne for eight months. After the Liberation of France in 1944 he helped to relaunch l'École Émancipée, and remained involved with the journal for the rest of his life. He died on 9 July 1969 in Saumur, Maine-et-Loire, aged 89.

== Bibliography ==
- Bouët, Louis (1924). Le Syndicalisme dans l'enseignement. libr. le 'l'École émancipée', 15, rue Fardeau.
- Salducci, Servet; Bouët, Louis; Dommanget, Maurice (1934). La Fédération de l'enseignement dans les assises syndicales. Interventions de Serret, L. Bouet, Salducci au Congrès confédéral unitaire (23-29 septembre 1933), et de Dommanget au Congrès de la Fédération autonome (19 novembre 1933). Impr.-libr. du Travail.
- Bouët, Louis (1941). Les pionniers du syndicalisme universitaires. Ed. de l'École émancipée.
- Bouët, Louis (1973). Trente ans de combat: syndicaliste et pacifiste. L'Amitiâe par le livre.
