= Alphonse Merrheim =

French copper smith and trade union leader

Alphonse Adolphe Merrheim
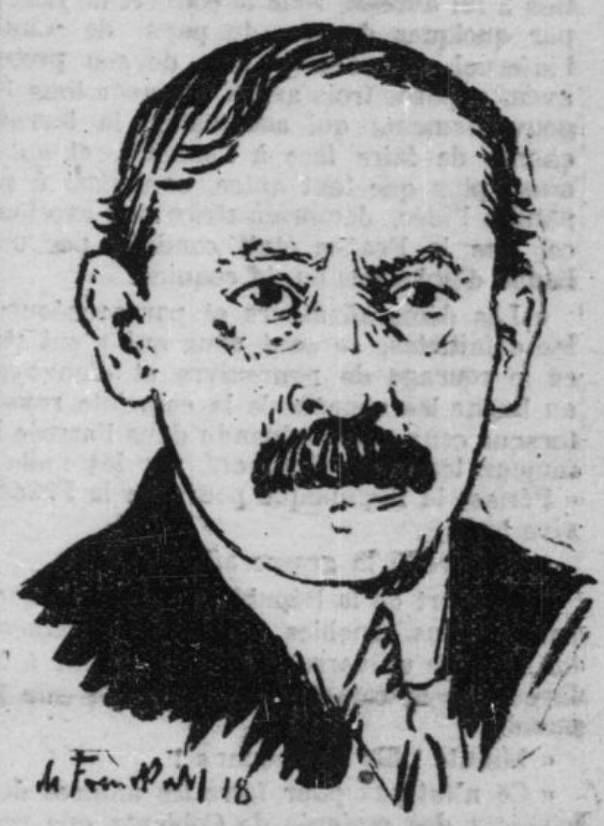
- Alphonse Merrheim
- Born: 7 May 1871; La Madeleine, Nord, France
- Died: 23 October 1925 (aged 54)
- Occupation: Metalworker
- Known for: Syndicalism

Alphonse Adolphe Merrheim (7 May 1871 – 23 October 1925) was a French copper smith and trade union leader.

== Early years ==
Alphonse Adolphe Merrheim was born on 7 May 1871 in La Madeleine, Nord, a suburb of Lille. He became a coppersmith, and adopted revolutionary syndicalist views. He arrived in Paris in 1904, and soon after met Pierre Monatte at the office of Pages Libres. The two men would work together to launch La Vie Ouvrière (The Worker's Life). Bourchet was secretary of the copper workers' union, and when it merged with the metalworker's union, he became head of the combined union. Bourchet resigned abruptly, and Merrheim was persuaded to take on the leadership. He became secretary of the Fédération des Métaux (Federation of metalworkers) in 1905.

Merrheim was immediately thrown into dealing with strikes at Cluses, Hennebont and Meurthe-et-Moselle. He discovered the power of the employers and the need to strengthen the labor unions and to coordinate the different trades. He was pragmatic, impatient with theoretical debates, and saw the need to understand the realities of the capitalist system and to understand what the employers were doing. During the period from 1904 to 1914 Merrheim became recognized as a leader of the French trade union movement.

Merrheim was one of the architects of the Charter of Amiens. The Charter, passed almost unanimously at the GCT congress in Amiens in October 1906, asserted a separation between unions and political parties. Members of unions could freely participate in the political parties as they chose, but the unions should unite in direct economic action against employees. As a revolutionary syndicalist, Merrheim said that the unions could break laws that stifled them. He was one of the first to foresee the coming of World War I (July 1914 – November 1918). In 1908 Merrheim attended a Congress in Marseille where he compared the present situation to that of 1870, when the result of the Franco-Prussian War was to destroy the first Workers' International.

== World War I ==
In 1914, Merrheim belonged to the internationalist core of La Vie ouvrière (The Worker's Life) led by Pierre Monatte and Alfred Rosmer. In 1914, he was acting secretary of the Confédération générale du travail (CGT, General Confederation of Labor). With the outbreak of war there was a panic when Paris was threatened. In September the confederate bureau followed the government to Bordeaux. Merrheim became the leader of a small group of anti-war unionists in Paris, at first based at the Vie Ouvrière offices at 96, quai Jemmapes. They were in agreement with the Russian socialist parties, who were also against the war. They were in contact with Martov, who brought Leon Trotsky to meet the group at the end of 1914.

On 15 August 1915, a pacifist resolution was presented at the CGT's national congress at the initiative of Merrheim and Albert Bourderon, signed by several militants of the federation of teacher's unions including Louis Bouët, Fernand Loriot, Louis Lafosse, Marie Guillot, Marie Mayoux, Marthe Bigot and Hélène Brion. The resolution said "this war is not our war" and laid responsibility on the leaders of the belligerent states. The resolution denounced the union sacrée and called for the restoration of liberty.

Merrheim was a delegate to the conference at Zimmerwald in Switzerland, held from 5–8 September 1915. It was organized by the Italian socialist party, which was opposed to the war. Merrheim and Bourderon, both secretaries of federations within the CGT, represented the French pacifists. On arriving in Berne, Merrheim and Bourderon met with Vladimir Lenin. Merrheim and Lenin talked for eight hours but could not come to agreement. Lenin wanted to create the Third International at once, and told Merrheim when he returned to France he must call for a strike against the war. Merrheim said he had not come to create a Third International, and did not even know if he would be able to say what had been discussed in Zimmerwald. He just wanted to make an appeal to the proletariat of all countries to unite in action against the war.

The conference published an appeal, mostly drawn up by Trotsky and the Swiss socialist Robert Grimm, that called for reestablishment of peace between the peoples, calling on the workers of Europe to fight for peace without annexations or indemnities. They should fight for liberty, for the fraternity of peoples, for socialism. The French censors ensured that the press did not report the conference, but the news filtered out. Bourderon and Merrheim arranged for 10,000 copies of a pamphlet to be published by the Federation of metalworkers, and another pamphlet with 4,500 copies was issued by Alfred Rossmer. The authorities banned the pamphlets, but they were distributed clandestinely. In 1916 the CAI took the name Comité pour la reprise des relations internationales (CRRI, Committee for the resumption of international relations), with Merrheim and Bourderon as secretaries.

A new international socialist conference at Kienthal was arranged by the Swiss for the end of April 1916. Merrheim, Bourderon and Marie Mayoux of the teacher's federation were expected to represent France, but they were refused the passports they needed to travel. Three delegates from the socialist party (SFIO, Section Française de l'Internationale Ouvrière) led by Alexandre Blanc were able to attend, since they were deputies and had parliamentary immunity. In July and August the CRRI leaders met with Trotsky but disagreed with his attacks on the pacifist but centrist followers of Jean Longuet in the SFIO. Trotsky was expelled from France in October 1916 and found his way to the United States via France. The CRRI issued a brochure calling for peace on 9 October 1916, repeating the conclusions of the Zimmerwald conference.

In February 1917, the Committee for the Resumption of International Relations split, with Pierre Brizon, Jean Raffin-Dugens and Albert Bourderon joining the SFIO minority led by Jean Longuet, while the socialists Fernand Loriot, Charles Rappoport, Louise Saumoneau and François Mayoux took control of the committee. Merrheim withdrew to concentrate on union work. When the Russian Revolution began in the spring of 1917 Merrheim declared that it was setting an example for all the peoples of the nations at war.

== Post war ==
In 1918, Merrheim became a supporter of Léon Jouhaux against the revolutionaries. He ended up on the right wing of the CGT. Merrheim died on 23 October 1925, aged 52.

Pierre Monatte wrote a memoir in La Révolution Prolétarienne of November 1925. The two men had fallen out after the war, but Monatte said of his earlier years "The Merrheim who was large, who dominated us all, who remains in the history of our movement, was first the one who was a model of a militant syndicalist from 1904 to 1918, and last and above all the one who went to Zimmerwald. His last years, cannot make us forget all that he was for fifteen years."
