= Alexandre Blanc =

French schoolteacher, socialist and national deputy

- Alexandre Blanc in 1915
- Born: Alexandre Marius Henri Blanc; 14 September 1874; Camps-la-Source, Var, France
- Died: 26 August 1924 (aged 49); Alfortville, Seine, France
- Occupation: Teacher
- Known for: National deputy

Alexandre Marius Henri Blanc (14 September 1874 - 26 August 1924) was a French schoolteacher, socialist and national deputy. He belonged to the left wing of the socialist party, and during World War I was pacifist. After the war he was one of the founders of the French Communist Party.

== Early years ==
Alexandre Marius Henri Blanc was born in Camps-la-Source, Var, on 14 September 1874. He studied at the Ecole normale in Avignon. He was appointed a teacher in Monteux, Vaucluse. In 1902 he was elected a member of the departmental council of primary education. Blanc was elected a national deputy for Orange, Vaucluse in the second round of the general election of 6 and 20 May 1906, running on the platform of the Socialist Unity Party. In the 1910 election, running for the same district and platform, he was defeated and returned to teaching and to activism in the socialist federation of Vaucluse.

== World War I ==
In the 26 April and 10 May 1914 general elections Alexandre Blanc regained his seat on the second ballot. During World War I (July 1914 - November 1918) Blanc remained with the parliamentary minority that gradually took a more traditional position, leading to the split of the socialist party in 1920. After Jean Jaurès had been assassinated, he refused to follow the leadership of Pierre Renaudel and would not join the Union sacrée.

An international socialist conference at Kienthal in Switzerland was arranged for the end of April 1916, a follow-up to the 1915 Zimmerwald Conference. The Confédération générale du travail (CGT, General Confederation of Labor) leaders Alphonse Merrheim, Albert Bourderon and Marie Mayoux were expected to represent France, but were refused the passports they needed to travel. Three delegates from the socialist party (SFIO, Section Française de l'Internationale Ouvrière) led by Alexandre Blanc were able to attend as deputies with parliamentary immunity. The other two, also teachers by profession, were Pierre Brizon and Jean Raffin-Dugens. At the conference Blanc managed to offend all the attendees by referring to alleged German atrocities in Belgium, and had to be halted by Robert Grimm, the president of the conference. A resolution was agreed in which the Workers' International was attacked for failing to oppose the war.

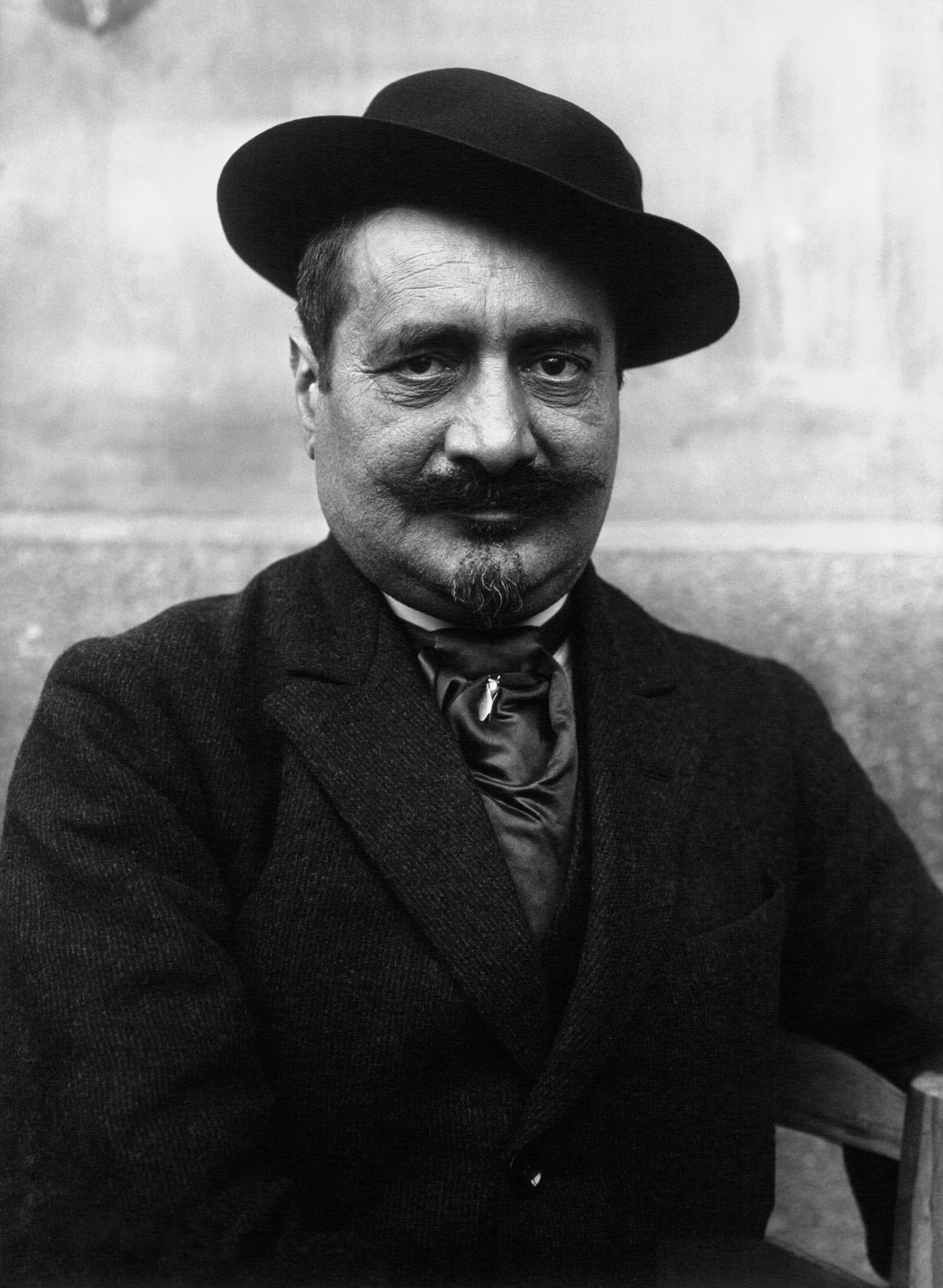
Alexandre Blanc in 1921

On his return, in June 1916 Blanc was one of three French Socialist deputies who voted against providing war credits. The delegates were condemned by the socialist paper L'Humanité as "the pilgrims of Kienthal." Even Jean Longuet, the grandson of Karl Marx and nominally head of the pacifist section of the socialist party, said he would continue to vote for war credits. At the August 1916 party conference "the dangerous deviationism of Kienthal" was condemned. There was debate over whether the French should send official representatives to the meeting of the Third Zimmerwald Conference at Stockholm in September 1917. The "three pilgrims" presented a resolution in June 1917 in favor. In the end, the French did not attend.

Shortly before the war ended, in October 1918 Blanc wrote that his group would support the majority if, as promised, they led the party back to the International, and fight them if they did not. However, it was not clear if this meant the defunct Second International or the emerging Moscow-based Third International.

== Later career ==
The Socialist party held a congress in Paris on 11–14 September 1919 to discuss the electoral program and tactics. The left and center of the party wanted to declare solidarity with the Russian Revolution, while Renaudel on the right threatened to resign rather than join the Third International. The congress agreed on a compromise manifesto. At the end of the turbulent congress the Left felt embittered and isolated. Blanc said the party had in fact split, which would be obvious during the elections. He said, "Would not a good divorce be better than a bad marriage?"

Blanc was reelected for the department of Vaucluse in the elections of 16 November 1919 at the top of the Socialist party list. At the December 1920 Tours Congress he was part of the left-leaning majority of the SFIO that formed the French Communist Party (SFIC, Section française de l'Internationale communiste). Due to a serious illness he was unable to run in the general elections of 1924, and retired from politics. He was accepted back by the Education department, but died before resuming work. He died in Alfortville, Seine, on 26 August 1924.
