= Jean Raffin-Dugens =

French politician

Jean Pierre Raffin-Dugens
- Jean Raffin-Dugens
- Born: 3 December 1861; Saint-Pierre-d'Allevard, Isère, France
- Died: 26 March 1946 (aged 84); Grenoble, Isère, France
- Occupation: Politician
- Known for: Pacifism

Jean Pierre Raffin-Dugens (3 December 1861 – 26 March 1946) was a French politician. He was a socialist, internationalist and pacifist. During World War I (1914–1918) he was one of the few national deputies to remain true to the principle that the workers of the world should not support wars between their countries arranged by political and military leaders. After attending an international pacifist conference in Switzerland in 1916 he was subject to a storm of criticism. He was not reelected after the war.

== Early years ==
Jean Pierre Raffin-Dugens was born on 3 December 1861 in Saint-Pierre-d'Allevard, Isère. He became a teacher. He believed in freethought, and in 1905 attended an international congress of freethought, "the Trocadéro", at Voiron in Isère. There he first met Pierre Brizon.

Raffin-Dugens entered politics in 1910, running for the 2nd district of Grenoble in the department of Isère in the national elections. He was elected in the second round of voting. He was very active in defending the principles on which he was elected. He was involved in issues concerning education, and was strongly and actively opposed to military spending. Raffin-Dugens was reelected in 1914 in the second round of voting.

== World War I ==
Raffin-Dugens stayed true to his pacifist principles after the outbreak of World War I (July 1914 – November 1918). He said he regretted the socialists having voted for war funding, and demanded resumption of contacts between socialists of all countries. In 1915 he criticized Jules Guesde's position of "war to the end".

An international socialist conference at Kienthal in Switzerland was arranged for the end of April 1916, a follow-up to the 1915 Zimmerwald Conference. The Confédération générale du travail (CGT, General Confederation of Labor) leaders Alphonse Merrheim, Albert Bourderon and Marie Mayoux were expected to represent France, but were refused the passports they needed to travel. Three delegates from the SFIO led by Alexandre Blanc were able to attend as deputies with parliamentary immunity. Raffin-Dugins and Pierre Brizon accompanied Blanc. All three were teachers by profession.

On their return from Switzerland, the three deputies were the targets of a violent press campaign in which they were accused of being defeatists, traitors and spies. They were repudiated by leaders of the Socialist party. On 24 June 1916 Brizon, Blanc and Raffins-Dugens refused to vote for war credits. Writing in Le Populaire on 3–9 July 1916 Jean Longuet said the stance of Brizon, Blanc and Raffin-Dugens was courageous, in strong contrast to that of the other elected socialists.

In December 1916, at the CGT's second national conference in Paris, Raffin-Dugens and Bourderon broke ranks with the Zimmerwaldians. They voted with the SFIO minority, in favor of accepting U.S. President Woodrow Wilson's offer to mediate peace. In February the Committee for the Resumption of International Relations split, with Raffin-Dugens, Bourderon and Brizon joining the SFIO minority led by Jean Longuet, while the Socialists Fernand Loriot, Charles Rappoport, Louise Saumoneau and François Mayoux took control of the committee. Merrheim withdrew to concentrate on union work.

== Post-war ==
On 11 November 1918 Raffin-Dugens was the only deputy to vote against a national tribute to the armed forces and to President Georges Clemenceau and Ferdinand Foch. In 1919 Raffin-Dugens voted against demanding reparations from Germany. He insisted that the German people should not be made responsible for the imperialism of their leaders, and called for a German Republic to be established. His courageous defense of his principles did not win him reelection in the 1919 national elections. During the Tours Congress of 1920 he moved to the Communist Party, along with the majority of Socialists. He did not take much further part on politics. Jean Raffin-Dugins died on 26 March 1946 in Grenoble, Isère.
