= François Mayoux =

French teacher, communist and revolutionary syndicalist (1882–1967)

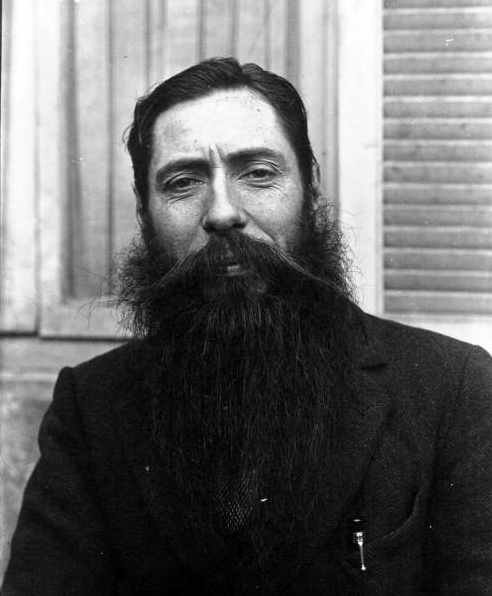
- François Mayoux c. 1920
- Born: 24 June 1882; Beaulieu-sur-Sonnette, Charente, France
- Died: 21 July 1967 (aged 85); La Ciotat, Bouches-du-Rhône, France
- Occupation: Teacher
- Known for: Anarcho-syndicalism

François Mayoux (French pronunciation: [fʁɑ̃swa maju]; 24 June 1882 – 21 July 1967) was a French teacher who became a communist and revolutionary syndicalist. He and his wife Marie Mayoux were imprisoned during World War I for publishing a pacifist pamphlet. He wrote many articles for anarchist journals.

== Early years ==
François Mayoux was born on 24 June 1882 in Beaulieu-sur-Sonnette, Charente. He became a teacher, and his partner Marie Mayoux was also a teacher. Marie and Francois taught in Charente, then in Bouches-du-Rhône. They belonged to the Fédération nationale des Syndicats d'institutrices et instituteurs publics.

== Socialist ==
During World War I (1914–18) the Mayouxes were firm pacifists and hostile to the Union sacrée. They both joined the socialist French Section of the Workers' International (SFIO: Section française de l'internationale ouvrière) in 1915. They were placed on Carnet B.

The International Action Committee (CAI: Comité d'action internationale) was founded in December 1915 by French syndicalists who supported the pacifist declarations of the Zimmerwald Conference. In 1916 the CAI merged with the Socialist Minority Committee to form the Committee for the Resumption of International Relations (Comité pour la réprise des rélations internationales). In February 1917 the Committee for the Resumption of International Relations split up. Alphonse Merrheim withdrew to concentrate on union work. Pierre Brizon, Jean Raffin-Dugens and Bourderon joining the SFIO minority led by Jean Longuet. The socialists Fernand Loriot, Charles Rappoport, Louise Saumoneau and François Mayoux took control of the committee.

In 1917 the Mayouxes were condemned to two years in prison and a heavy fine for published a pacifist brochure entitled "The Teachers Union and the War". The teacher and pacifist Madeleine Vernet gave a home to their eldest son. Marie was released on 1 April 1919 after ten months. Francois had to wait to be released until the amnesty shortly before the legislative elections of 14 November 1919. Their licenses to teach were revoked, and would not be reinstated until 1924.

== Communist ==
The Mayouxes left the SFIO in November 1919 and joined the French Communist Party (PCF: Parti communiste français) after the Congress of Tours. Francois was secretary of the Union des syndicats des Bouches-du-Rhône from 1919 to 1921. Marie and François Mayoux were expelled from the PCF at the Party congress held in Paris from 16 to 19 October 1922 as "unrepentant sydicalists". Francois said this was due to their defense of the autonomy of unions from the Communist Party, and their sympathy with the Russian opposition.

== Anarchist ==
From 1923 to 1936 the Mayouxes published a small bulletin Notre point de vue. They became libertarian, and wrote for anarchist journals such as La Revue Anarchiste, La Voix Libertaire, CQFD, Défense de l'Homme and Le Monde Libertaire. In 1929 they were expelled from the Confédération générale du travail unitaire (CGTU), but continued their activism. After being expelled from the CGTU they founded an independent teachers' union. They supported the Republicans in the Spanish Civil War (1936–39) and denounced the Stalinist "gravediggers." At the start of World War II (1939–45) their son Jehan Mayoux, who shared his parents' pacifist convictions, refused conscription and was imprisoned. After the war Francois wrote his memoirs while in retirement in La Ciotat. François Mayoux died on 21 July 1967 at La Ciotat.

== Publications ==
- Marie Mayoux; François Mayoux (1917). Les Instituteurs syndicalistes et la guerre. p. 16.
- François Mayoux (1992). Instituteurs pacifistes et syndicalistes: mémoires de F. Mayoux. Chamalières : Éd. Canope. p. 363.

== Sources ==
- Jacquier, Charles (1994). "André Bösiger, Souvenirs d'un rebelle __**__ Marie et François Mayoux, Instituteurs pacifistes et syndicalistes, introduction de Daniel Guérin, postface de Madeleine Rebérioux". Mil Neuf Cent (in French). 12 (12): 248–253.
- Gankin, Olga Hess; Fisher, Harold Henry (1940). The Bolsheviks and the World War: The Origin of the Third International. Stanford University Press. OCLC 602530.
- "Marie et François Mayoux". Ephéméride Anarchiste (in French). Archived from the original on 2015-04-22.
- "MAYOUX Marie et François, dits BOUGON Joséphine et BOUGON Constant". Dictionnaire Biographique Mouvement Ouvrier Mouvement Social (in French). Maitron/Editions de l'Atelier.
- R.D. (2012-09-13). "VERNET Madeleine [CAVELIER Madeleine, Eugénie, Clémentine, Victorine, dite]". Dictionnaire international des militants anarchistes (in French).
- Riddell, John, ed. (2011-10-14). "Trade Unions". Toward the United Front: Proceedings of the Fourth Congress of the Communist International, 1922. BRILL. ISBN 978-90-04-20778-3.
- Wohl, Robert (1966-01-01). French Communism in the Making, 1914–1924. Stanford University Press. p. 149. ISBN 978-0-8047-0177-8.
