= Lucie Colliard =

French teacher, pacifist, trade unionist and communist

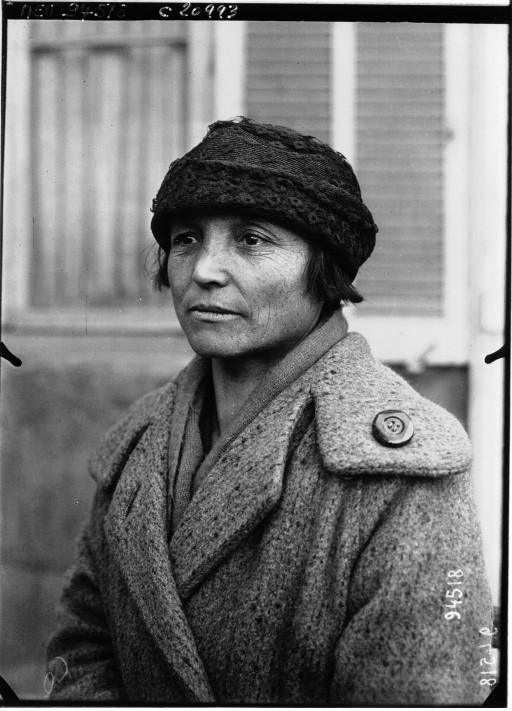
- Lucie Colliard, 1921
- Born: Lucie Claudine Parmelan; 24 January 1877; Saint-Félix, Haute-Savoie, France
- Died: August 12, 1961 (aged 84)
- Occupation: Teacher
- Known for: Trade unionism

Lucie Colliard, born Lucie Claudine Parmelan (24 January 1877 – 12 August 1961) was a French teacher, pacifist, trade unionist and communist from Haute-Savoie. She helped found the French teachers' union.

She was dismissed from her position as a teacher during World War I (1914–18) for her pacifist activities. She was active in the far left of the communist movement in France in the 1920s and 1930s.

== Life ==
=== Pre-war ===
Lucie Colliard was a native of Saint-Félix, in the Albanais, south of Haute-Savoie. She was born in 1877. She studied at a religious school for a period, then at a normal school, where she qualified as a teacher.

At the Congress of Chambéry in 1912 she campaigned for creation of teachers' unions, which had previously been prohibited. Only friendly societies were tolerated, since the authorities considered that a teacher was a civil servant, should represent the state and should not organize or stand for election.

The congress was also one of the first to discuss feminism in education, a fight in which Colliard would play a leading role. She became an activist in the French Section of the Workers' International (SFIO: Section Française de l'Internationale Ouvrière) in 1912.

=== World War I ===
During World War I (1914–18) Colliard was assigned to a teaching position near the Swiss border. She received pacifist colleagues and helped them cross the border into Switzerland to attend the major meetings of international socialists and pacifists.

In June 1917 Colliard was forced to move to a new school due to her "extreme pacifism" and because she had expressed sympathy for the German people. Georges Clemenceau returned to power in mid-November 1917, and launched a violent campaign against defeatism that lasted throughout 1918.

The first CGT congress since the war started was held in Paris in July 1918, at a time when the city was threatened by a new German offensive. The delegates agreed on a compromise on the union sacrée, but Brion was in the minority of 253 who voted against it.

Colliard was arrested in 1918 and her licence to teach was revoked until 1925. Lucie Colliard and Hélène Brion, both feminists, were among the five female teachers dismissed for pacifist activity. Other feminist teachers were strongly reprimanded for pacifism, including Marthe Pichorel, Marthe Bigot and Marie Guillot. Only two male teachers were dismissed for pacifism. In 1918 Colliard founded the journal La Vague (The Wave).

=== Post-war ===
In 1920 Colliard joined the French Communist Party (PCF: Parti communiste français). The communists attempted to mobilize women, but with limited success. At the PCF's Tours Congress in December 1920 Colliard was appointed a délégué à la propagande, a propagandist. She and Madeleine Pelletier were the only two women to attend Tours alone.

Three other women came with their husbands. Colliard participated in the Committee for the Third International. She was a member of the French delegation to the Third Congress of the Communist International in Moscow in 1921. The delegation's members were chosen by the PCF's 24-member Steering Committee (CD: Comité Directeur).

Colliard was appointed a member of the International Women's Secretariat at the Second International Communist Women's Conference held on 9–15 June 1921, just before the Third International Congress. The other members were Clara Zetkin, Hertha Sturm. Alexandra Kollontai, Zlata Lilina (Grigory Zinoviev's wife) and Varvara Kasparova. She wrote on 7 October 1921 that the secretariat had been formed, "under the pressure of the Executive Committee of the Cominterm, itself alarmed by communist female militants." She wrote, "The program is far-reaching, but our courage is without limits."

Colliard was a deputy member of the CD from 1922 to 1924. She was a member of the female secretariat of the Confédération générale du travail unitaire (CGTU) from 1923 to 1925. Colliard was dispatched by Charles Tillon to support the sardine cannery strike at Douarnenez, Finistère in 1924. She reported on this "belle grève de femmes" (fine women's strike) from start to finish for l'Humanité.

She was ill at ease with the word "comrade", which she felt was "more Bolshevik than Breton". Her account was published as a book in 1925. It served as a guide for other food workers, and for workers in general. Colliard signed the letter of the 250 to the executive committee of the Communist International in 1925.

Colliard taught at Bogève, Haute-Savoie from 1925 to 1930. She became actively opposed to the party's position in 1926. In 1927 she joined the journal Contre le courant. Colliard was expelled from the Communist Party in 1929. She was a co-signatory of the Manifesto of the 22 for trade union unity in 1930. She was a member of the organizing committee for the rally against war and the union sacrée in 1935.

She agitated in support of the Spanish republicans and against repression in the USSR. Colliard joined the Workers and Peasants' Socialist Party (PSOP: Parti socialiste ouvrier et paysan) in 1938. This was founded by "Pivertists" (followers of Marceau Pivert), a left-wing group which split off soon after the failure of the Front Populaire in 1938.

At the 1939 congress she advocated prohibition of double-membership in the Freemasons. After World War II (1939–45) she rejoined the SFIO federation of the Seine, held by Pivertists, and became assistant federal secretary.

Lucie Colliard was elected to the municipal council of Clichy, Hauts-de-Seine in April 1945 and became deputy mayor two years later, at the age of seventy. She left the SFIO in 1958, and died in 1961 aged about 84.

== Publications ==
- Colliard, Lucie (1925). Une belle Grève de Femmes : DOUARNENEZ (PDF). Paris: Librairies de l'humanité.

== Sources ==
- Chambelland, Colette (1999). Pierre Monatte: une autre voix syndicaliste. Editions de l'Atelier. ISBN 978-2-7082-3460-4.
- "Colliard (1877-1961)". La Bataille socialiste (in French). 5 September 2007.
- Fauré, Christine (2004-06-02). Political and Historical Encyclopaedia of Women. Routledge. ISBN 978-1-135-45690-0.
- Gruber, Helmut; Graves, Pamela M. (1998). Women and Socialism, Socialism and Women: Europe Between the Two World Wars. Berghahn Books. ISBN 978-1-57181-152-3.
- Guéraiche, William (1999-01-01). Les femmes et la République: essai sur la répartition du pouvoir de 1943 à 1979 (in French). Editions de l'Atelier. ISBN 978-2-7082-3468-0.
- Kalman, Samuel; Kennedy, Sean (2014-01-15). The French Right between the Wars: Political and Intellectual Movements from Conservatism to Fascism. Berghahn Books. ISBN 978-1-78238-241-6.
- "Lucie Colliard". Histoire Vuache. 4 September 2012.
- "Lucie Colliard". Parisien Images (in French). Bibliothèque Marguerite Durand. Archived from the original on 2014-12-13.
- Maitron, Jean (1989). Communisme - Révolution Française. L'AGE D'HOMME. ISBN 978-2-8251-3407-8.
- "Photographie de Colliard Lucie". Mémoire Alpine.
- Siegel, Mona L. (2004-12-02). The Moral Disarmament of France: Education, Pacifism, and Patriotism, 1914-1940. Cambridge University Press. ISBN 978-0-521-83900-6.
- Sowerwine, Charles (1982). Sisters Or Citizens?: Women and Socialism in France Since 1876. Cambridge University Press. ISBN 978-0-521-23484-9.
- Tartakowsky, Danielle (1997-01-01). Les manifestations de rue en France, 1918-1968 (in French). Publications de la Sorbonne. ISBN 978-2-85944-307-8.
- Vigreux, Jean (2014-05-24). "La grève des sardinières de Douarnenez (Finistère) en 1924 : une grève communiste ?". Paprik@2F (in French).
- Wohl, Robert (1966-01-01). French Communism in the Making, 1914-1924. Stanford University Press. ISBN 978-0-8047-0177-8.
