= Louise Saumoneau =

French feminist who later renounced feminism, union leader and socialist

- Born: Louise Aimée Saumoneau; 17 December 1875; Poitiers, France
- Died: 23 February 1950 (aged 74)
- Occupations: Seamstress, Politician
- Known for: Socialism, Pacifism

Louise Saumoneau (17 December 1875 – 23 February 1950) was a French feminist who later renounced feminism as being irrelevant to the class struggle. She became a union leader and a prominent socialist. During World War I she was active in the internationalist pacifist movement. In a change of stance, after the war she remained with the right of the socialist party after the majority split off to form the French Communist Party.

== Early years ==
Louise Aimée Saumoneau was born on 17 December 1875 near Poitiers. Her father was a cabinet maker who worked for a large workshop. Her elder sister married a cabinet maker and moved to Paris. In late 1896 Saumoneau, her younger sister and her parents joined her older sister in Paris. She worked as a seamstress doing piecework to help bring some income to the family, which now included her older sister's four children.

== Pre-war activism ==
Around 1898 Saumoneau took a half day off work to attend a feminist meeting, and was annoyed when much time was spent discussing whether dowries were acceptable, an irrelevant topic to a working-class woman. In 1899 Saumoneau and Élisabeth Renaud founded the first Feminist Socialist Group (Groupe Féministe Socialiste, GFS). The GFS manifesto protested the "double oppression of women, exploited on a large scale by capitalism, subject to men by laws and especially by prejudice."

At the feminist congress that began on 5 September 1900, chaired by Marguerite Durand, most of the delegates were from the elite rather than working women. Saumoneau and Renaud were admitted somewhat reluctantly. While the attendees had no difficulty supporting a resolution that called for an eight-hour day for industrial workers, with a full day off, they had considerable difficulty supporting a proposal that their own maids should get the same conditions. Saumoneau and Renaud pushed the point. They received a cold reception. Saumoneau and Renaud joined the Conseil National des Femmes Français when it was founded in 1901, headed by Sarah Monod. The majority of the members were moderate bourgeois republicans. The socialists were a tiny minority on the left of this movement, balanced by the Catholic Right led by Marie Maugeret. Saumoneau became hostile to feminism, seeing the class struggle as more important. She denounced "bourgeois" feminism and took little interest in problems unique to women.

In 1900 Saumoneau organized a union of seamstresses, which was associated with other groups in three working-class neighborhoods of Paris. Saumoneau was elected secretary, helped by her younger sister Berthe. A strike of tailors and seamstresses employed by workshops started in the middle of February 1901. The press gave it wide coverage, particularly the feminist La Fronde, and the strikers received significant financial support. The strike ended in what was essentially defeat a month later. Saumoneau became convinced that unions must represent both men and women. In September 1901 her union was dissolved and its members joined the men's union, now open to garment workers of both sexes. Saumoneau saw that the working women had more in common with working men than with women of the bourgeoisie. She could not find a way for a woman's group to be effective outside the male-dominated unions.

Saumoneau and Renaud published La Femme socialiste from 1901 to 1902. Saumoneau fell out with Renaud in 1902 and the GFS became less active. In 1905 the Socialist Party (Section Française de l'Internationale Ouvrière, SFIO) would not accept the GFS as a constituent organization, and it disappeared. Louise Saumoneau revived La Femme socialiste as an educational and propaganda organ in 1912, and continued to publish it until 1940. In January 1913 Saumoneau, Marianne Rauze, Elisabeth Renaud and others founded the Socialist Women's Group (Groupe des Femmes Socialistes, GDFS) for women within the SFIO. Saumoneau threw out all feminists from the GDFS and started a vigorous program to recruit socialist women, which was interrupted by the outbreak of World War I. By 1914 there were 90,000 members of the Socialist party but still only 1,000 women, half of them the wives or daughters of male members. On 5 July 1914 Saumoneau led the first event of the International Working Women's Day, held just before the outbreak of war.

== World War I ==
The GDFS broke up due to disagreements during World War I (July 1914 – November 1918). Saumoneau took a pacifist position. Early in 1915 Saumoneau distributed the German socialist Clara Zetkin's essay in which she called on socialist women to fight for peace. "When the men kill, it is up to us women to fight for the preservation of life. When the men are silent, it is our duty to raise our voices on behalf of our ideals." Zetkin organized an international conference of socialist women in Bern, Switzerland late in March 1915 as a protest against the war. Saumoneau was the only French representative. Saumoneau pointed out that although the masses were against the war, their leaders were afraid to take a strong stand. She did not say what could be done. On her return from Bern, Saumoneau was persecuted both by the police and by her own SFIO party.

When Aletta Jacobs organized a feminist and pacifist congress at The Hague in 1915 she wanted French participation but would not invite Saumoneau. In her turn, Saumoneau said she would never cooperate with Jacobs, who was from a wealthy family.

The International Action Committee (Comité d'action internationale) was founded in December 1915 by French syndicalists who supported the pacifist declarations of the Zimmerwald Conference. In 1916 this was merged with the Socialist Minority Committee to form the Committee for the Resumption of International Relations (Comité pour la réprise des rélations internationales). Albert Bourderon proposed and Saumoneau supported a manifesto that said the committee would function "until the party majority and the International Socialist Bureau resume international relations." In February 1917 the Committee for the Resumption of International Relations split up. Alphonse Merrheim withdrew to concentrate on union work. Pierre Brizon, Jean Raffin-Dugens and Bourderon joining the SFIO minority led by Jean Longuet. The socialists Fernand Loriot, Charles Rappoport, Louise Saumoneau and François Mayoux took control of the committee.

== Post war ==
At the Tours Congress in December 1920 the SFIO split. The majority voted to join the communist Third International and to create the French Section of the Communist International (Section française de l'Internationale communiste, SFIC). The faction led by Léon Blum and including most elected socialists, such as Paul Faure and Jean Longuet, stayed with the Second International, later to become the Labour and Socialist International and then today's Socialist International. This group retained the SFIO name. Saumoneau stayed with the socialist SFIO rather than join the French Communist Party. Saumoneau had been a strong supporter of the Third International before 1920, so this was a significant rightward shift in her views.

Although Saumoneau's presence and that of other women activists had some influence within the party, the SFIO did not stand up for women's suffrage in the period before World War II. It was not until 1945 that French women gained the right to vote and to stand for election. The GDFS (Socialist Women's Group) was relaunched in 1922, and continued to 1931 when it was replaced by the National Committee of Socialist Women (Comité National des Femmes Socialistes, CNDFS). Saumoneau continued to publish Le Femme socialiste until 1940, when it closed down for the rest of World War II (1939–1945). Saumoneau revived the paper after the war, and published it from 1947 to 1949.

Louise Saumoneau died in 1950.

== Bibliography ==
- Saumoneau, Louise (1920). Miscellaneous Feminist Pamphlets. La Femme Socialiste.
- Saumoneau, Louise (1921). Études et critiques. L. Saumoneau.
- Saumoneau, Louise (1929). Luttes et souffrances de la femme. Imprimerie spéciale de la Femme socialiste.
- Saumoneau, Louise (1929). Principes et action féministes socialistes.
- Saumoneau, Louise (1924). Les Femmes socialistes contre la guerre. I. Appel de Clara Zetkin. Son introduction en France. L. Saumoneau.
- Saumoneau, Louise (1947). Continuité de l'action féminine socialiste.
- Saumoneau, Louise (1947). Le Devoir civique des femmes: par Louise Saumoneau. F. Deshayes.
- Saumoneau, Louise (1948). La Femme et le socialisme: par Louise Saumoneau. F. Deshayes.
