= Twenty-one Conditions =

Communist International's membership conditions

The Twenty-one Conditions, officially the Conditions of Admission to the Communist International, are the conditions, most of which were suggested by Vladimir Lenin, to the adhesion of the socialist parties to the Third International (Comintern) created in 1919. The conditions were formally adopted by the Second Congress of the Comintern in 1920.

== Content ==
The conditions were:

1	All propaganda and agitation must bear a really communist character and correspond to the programme and decisions of the Communist International. All the party's press organs must be run by reliable communists who have proved their devotion to the cause of the proletariat. The dictatorship of the proletariat must not be treated simply as a current formula learnt off by heart. Propaganda for it must be carried out in such a way that its necessity is comprehensible to every simple worker, every woman worker, every soldier and peasant from the facts of their daily lives, which must be observed systematically by our press and used day by day. The periodical and other press and all the party’s publishing institutions must be subordinated to the party leadership, regardless of whether, at any given moment, the party as a whole is legal or illegal. The publishing houses must not be allowed to abuse their independence and pursue policies that do not entirely correspond to the policies of the party. In the columns of the press, at public meetings, in the trades unions, in the co-operatives – wherever the members of the Communist International can gain admittance – it is necessary to brand not only the bourgeoisie but also its helpers, the reformists of every shade, systematically and pitilessly.
2	Every organisation that wishes to affiliate to the Communist International must regularly and methodically remove reformists and centrists from every responsible post in the labour movement (party organisations, editorial boards, trades unions, parliamentary factions, co-operatives, local government) and replace them with tested communists, without worrying unduly about the fact that, particularly at first, ordinary workers from the masses will be replacing 'experienced' opportunists.
3	In almost every country in Europe and America the class struggle is entering the phase of civil war. Under such conditions the communists can place no trust in bourgeois legality. They have the obligation of setting up a parallel organisational apparatus which, at the decisive moment, can assist the party to do its duty to the revolution. In every country where a state of siege or emergency laws deprive the communists of the opportunity of carrying on all their work legally, it is absolutely necessary to combine legal and illegal activity.
4	The duty of propagating communist ideas includes the special obligation of forceful and systematic propaganda in the army. Where this agitation is interrupted by emergency laws it must be continued illegally. Refusal to carry out such work would be tantamount to a betrayal of revolutionary duty and would be incompatible with membership of the Communist International.
5	Systematic and methodical agitation is necessary in the countryside. The working class will not be able to win if it does not have the backing of the rural proletariat and at least a part of the poorest peasants, and if it does not secure the neutrality of at least a part of the rest of the rural population through its policies. Communist work in the countryside is taking on enormous importance at the moment. It must be carried out principally with the help of revolutionary communist workers of the town and country who have connections with the countryside. To refuse to carry this work out, or to entrust it to unreliable, semi-reformist hands, is tantamount to renouncing the proletarian revolution.
6	Every party that wishes to belong to the Communist International has the obligation to unmask not only open social-patriotism but also the insincerity and hypocrisy of social-pacificism, to show the workers systematically that, without the revolutionary overthrow of capitalism, no international court of arbitration, no agreement on the limitation of armaments, no 'democratic' reorganisation of the League of Nations will be able to prevent new imperialist wars.
7	The parties that wish to belong to the Communist International have the obligation of recognising the necessity of a complete break with reformism and 'centrist' politics and of spreading this break among the widest possible circles of their party members. Consistent communist politics are impossible without this. The Communist International unconditionally and categorically demands the carrying out of this break in the shortest possible time. The Communist International cannot tolerate a situation where notorious opportunists, as represented by Turati, Modigliani, Kautsky, Hilferding, Hillquit, Longuet, MacDonald, etc., have the right to pass as members of the Communist International. This could only lead to the Communist International becoming something very similar to the wreck of the Second International.
8	A particularly marked and clear attitude on the question of the colonies and oppressed nations is necessary on the part of the communist parties of those countries whose bourgeoisies are in possession of colonies and oppress other nations. Every party that wishes to belong to the Communist International has the obligation of exposing the dodges of its 'own' imperialists in the colonies, of supporting every liberation movement in the colonies not only in words but in deeds, of demanding that their imperialist compatriots should be thrown out of the colonies, of cultivating in the hearts of the workers in their own country a truly fraternal relationship to the working population in the colonies and to the oppressed nations, and of carrying out systematic propaganda among their own country’s troops against any oppression of colonial peoples.
9	Every party that wishes to belong to the Communist International must systematically and persistently develop communist activities within the trades unions, workers’ and works councils, the consumer co-operatives and other mass workers’ organisations. Within these organisations it is necessary to organise communist cells which are to win the trades unions etc. for the cause of communism by incessant and persistent work. In their daily work the cells have the obligation to expose everywhere the treachery of the social patriots and the vacillations of the 'centrists'. The communist cells must be completely subordinated to the party as a whole.
10	Every party belonging to the Communist International has the obligation to wage a stubborn struggle against the Amsterdam 'International' of yellow trade union organisations. It must expound as forcefully as possible among trades unionists the idea of the necessity of the break with the yellow Amsterdam International. It must support the International Association of Red Trades Unions affiliated to the Communist International, at present in the process of formation, with every means at its disposal.
11	Parties that wish to belong to the Communist International have the obligation to subject the personal composition of their parliamentary factions to review, to remove all unreliable elements from them and to subordinate these factions to the party leadership, not only in words but also in deeds, by calling on every individual communist member of parliament to subordinate the whole of his activity to the interests of really revolutionary propaganda and agitation.
12	The parties belonging to the Communist International must be built on the basis of the principle of democratic centralism. In the present epoch of acute civil war the communist party will only be able to fulfil its duty if it is organised in as centralist a manner as possible, if iron discipline reigns within it and if the party centre, sustained by the confidence of the party membership, is endowed with the fullest rights and authority and the most far-reaching powers.
13	The communist parties of those countries in which the communists can carry out their work legally must from time to time undertake purges (re-registration) of the membership of their party organisations in order to cleanse the party systematically of the petty-bourgeois elements within it.
14	Every party that wishes to belong to the Communist International has the obligation to give unconditional support to every soviet republic in its struggle against the forces of counter-revolution. The communist parties must carry out clear propaganda to prevent the transport of war materiel to the enemies of the soviet republics. They must also carry out legal or illegal propaganda, etc., with every means at their disposal among troops sent to stifle workers’ republics.
15	Parties that have still retained their old social democratic programmes have the obligation of changing those programmes as quickly as possible and working out a new communist programme corresponding to the particular conditions in the country and in accordance with the decisions of the Communist International. As a rule the programme of every party belonging to the Communist International must be ratified by a regular Congress of the Communist International or by the Executive Committee. Should the Executive Committee of the Communist International reject a party’s programme, the party in question has the right of appeal to the Congress of the Communist International.
16	All decisions of the Congresses of the Communist International and decisions of its Executive Committee are binding on all parties belonging to the Communist International. The Communist International, acting under conditions of the most acute civil war, must be built in a far more centralist manner than was the case with the Second International. In the process the Communist International and its Executive Committee must, of course, in the whole of its activity, take into account the differing conditions under which the individual parties have to fight and work, and only take generally binding decisions in cases where such decisions are possible.
17	In this connection all those parties that wish to belong to the Communist International must change their names. Every party that wishes to belong to the Communist International must bear the name Communist Party of this or that country (Section of the Communist International). The question of the name is not formal, but a highly political question of great importance. The Communist International has declared war on the whole bourgeois world and on all yellow social-democratic parties. The difference between the communist parties and the old official 'social-democratic' or 'socialist' parties that have betrayed the banner of the working class must be clear to every simple toiler.
18	All the leading press organs of the parties in every country have the duty of printing all the important official documents of the Executive Committee of the Communist International.
19	All parties that belong to the Communist International or have submitted an application for membership have the duty of calling a special congress as soon as possible, and in no case later than four months after the Second Congress of the Communist International, in order to check all these conditions. In this connection all party centres must see that the decisions of the Second Congress are known to all their local organisations.
20	Those parties that now wish to enter the Communist International but have not yet radically altered their previous tactics must, before they join the Communist International, see to it that no less than two thirds of the central committee and of all their most important central institutions consist of comrades who even before the Second Congress of the Communist International spoke out unambiguously in public in favour of the entry of the party into the Communist International. Exceptions may be permitted with the agreement of the Executive Committee of the Communist International. The Executive Committee of the Communist International also has the right to make exceptions in relation to the representatives of the centrist tendency mentioned in paragraph 7.
21	Those party members who fundamentally reject the conditions and Theses laid down by the Communist International are to be expelled from the party.

== SFIO congress ==
During the December 1920 Tours Congress of the French Section of the Workers' International (SFIO), the 21 conditions were rejected although the majority, led by Fernand Loriot, Boris Souvarine, Marcel Cachin, and Ludovic Frossard, adhered to the Third International, creating the French Section of the Communist International (SFIC), which would later take the name of the French Communist Party (PCF).

== PSOE congress ==
At the July 1920 PSOE congress, Fernando de los Ríos proposed that the PSOE should join the Communist International only if defined conditions were met. He and Daniel Anguiano were appointed to visit the Russian Soviet Federative Socialist Republic to discuss membership of the PSOE in the Comintern. Their trip lasted from 17 October to 13 December 1920. While in Moscow de los Ríos met Lenin, who answered a question by de los Ríos about the compatibility between personal freedom and the length of the dictatorship of the proletariat with the often-quoted answer, "Freedom, what for?". De los Rios, who believed in a Fabian-humanist form of socialism, told his hosts in Russia that the PSOE should have the right to pick and choose from the Twenty-one Conditions, and should be completely independent of Moscow. This was completely unacceptable to the Bolsheviks.

At the PSOE Extraordinary Congress in April 1921, Anguiano gave a positive report on the Moscow visit and de los Ríos gave a negative report. The congress voted to reject the Twenty-one Conditions demanded by Moscow. Supporters of the Comintern left the PSOE and formed the Spanish Communist Workers Party, which combined with the Spanish Communist Party to form the Communist Party of Spain.

== See also ==
- Communist International
- Fourth International
- Fifth International
