= Volonté =

Volonté may refer to:

- Claudio Volonté (1934 – 1977), Italian actor
- Dernière Volonté, French musician
- Eraldo Volonté (1918 – 2003), Italian saxophonist
- Gian Maria Volonté (1933 – 1994), Italian actor
- Des Fleurs de bonne volonté, an 1890 work by French poet Jules Laforgue
- La volonté de paix, a French journal
- 4921 Volonté, a minor planet
