= Madeleine Vernet =

French teacher, writer, libertarian and pacifist

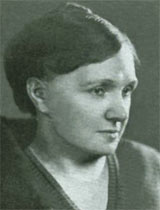
- Born: Madeleine Eugénie Clémentine Victorine Cavelier; 3 September 1878; Le Houlme, Seine-Inférieure, France
- Died: 5 October 1949 (aged 71); Levallois-Perret, Paris, France

Madeleine Vernet (3 September 1878 – 5 October 1949) was a French teacher, writer, libertarian and pacifist. She attacked abuses in the state system of foster homes, where children were often used for their labor. In 1906 she founded l'Avenir social, an orphanage for workers' children, which she ran despite government opposition until 1922, when she resigned after the board was taken over by Communists. She was a committed pacifist during World War I (1914–1918), and continued to be involved in pacifist organizations after the war.

== Life ==
=== Pre-war ===
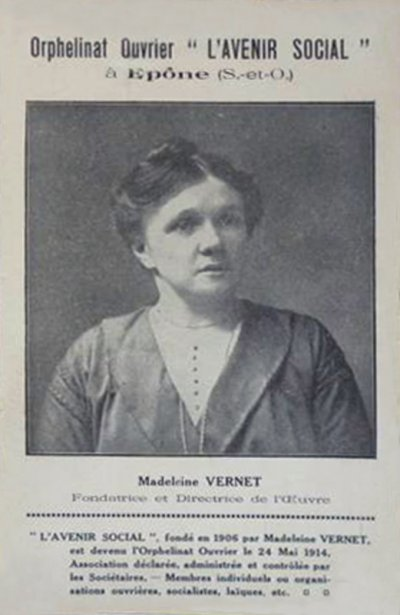
Postcard for "L’Avenir Social" with a picture of the founder

Madeleine Eugénie Clémentine Victorine Cavelier was born on 3 September 1878 in Le Houlme, then in Seine-Inférieure. In 1888 her parents settled in Barentin, Seine-Inférieure, where they ran a small business. Around 1900 her mother, now widowed, moved to Pissy-Pôville, Seine-Inférieure, and took charge of four girls from the public assistance. This inspired Madeleine to write a series of articles on "Bureautins" in Charles Guieysse's Pages libres journal in which she denounced the misery of foster children and the abuse tolerated by the administration. She wrote of families who received allowances for foster children and used them for labor. For her corrosive articles published in prominent newspapers she took the pen name "Madeleine Vernet". In response, the administration removed the girls assigned to her mother. Some time later she tried to create a first orphanage run by worker's cooperatives in the Rouen region, but the project failed.

In 1904 Madeleine Vernet participated in founding the Ruche at Rambouillet, a school dedicated to avant-garde education. She said educating children is one of the greatest social responsibilities. In late 1904 she went to Paris where she worked as a bookkeeper and tried to gain support for her plans from unions and cooperatives, journalists and deputies. In Paris she met Albert Thomas, Marcel Sembat and Georges Yvetot. She was disappointed in the lack of interest of the feminists, who were more concerned with themselves than with the social struggle. She was already associated with libertarian circles, and published a brochure on Free Love. The brochure denounced marriage, source of hypocrisy and sorrow, and affirmed the value of true love without chains or social obligations. However, she believed that a woman should become a mother. She contributed to Libertaire and Temps Nouveaux during the pre-war years, writing against the extremes of the neo-Malthusian doctrine which led to either reduction or elimination of births.

On 1 May 1906, thanks in part to her mother's savings, and helped by her sister and her companion Louis Tribier, Madeleine Vernet was able to found the orphanage l'Avenir social in a small house in Neuilly-Plaisance, Seine-et-Oise. In August 1906 she rented a second house, since the orphanage now had twenty-four residents. By 1907 there were seventeen boys and thirteen girls. The orphanage was supported by the donations of friends, assistance from the cooperative La Bellevilloise, and subscriptions from Humanité and Guerre sociale. In April 1908 she moved the orphanage to Épône, Seine-et-Oise. There she had to face opposition from the local clergy and harassment by the administration.

Vernet practiced the methods of Paul Robin in giving children a rational education. She argued in favor of coeducation, mixing girls and boys, rather than separating them as in a prison or convent. To her the ideal educational environment was the family. Her orphanage school was attacked for "unhealthy coeducation", a heavy fine was imposed and Madeleine's right to teach was withdrawn. The class was closed but the orphanage survived. On 12 October 1909 she married her partner Louis Tribier.

=== World War I ===
During World War I (1914–1918) Madeleine Vernet was forced to leave Épône for a period and move to the "colony of children of mobilized troops" in Étretat, Seine-Inférieure. She was able to return to Épône after the front stabilized. Throughout the war she engaged in pacifist propaganda. She clandestinely circulated the poem Pour les venger (To avenge them) which she dedicated to "all our missing comrades ... victims of error." She had some of her pacifist poems printed on postcards and mailed to soldiers fighting in the trenches. The authorities knew that she would use a court appearance as a public forum, and were careful not to detain her.

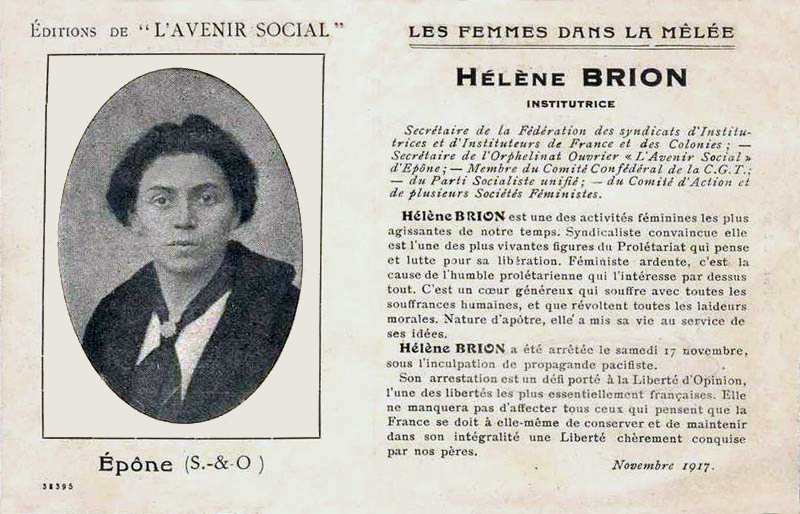
Hélène Brion, leaflet from the Éditions de "L'Avenir Social" (November 1917)

Madeleine Vernet gave a home to the eldest son of Marie and François Mayoux, who had been imprisoned for anti-militarist propaganda, and organized a defense committee for the teacher Hélène Brion, secretary of the Épône board. Two weeks after Brion had been arrested, Vernet produced a 30-page pamphlet that presented the case as another Dreyfus affair. She wrote, "From this tissue of infamies it came out that Hélène Brion was a dangerous and suspicious character--Anarchist, revolutionary, Malthusian, anti-militarist, defeatist. ... The word spy, which was not directly pronounced, was visible between the lines." Vernet presented a very different picture of a dedicated and generous person devoted to helping children, women and workers.

Madeleine Vernet distributed a clandestine brochure and two numbers of Les Voix qu’on étrangle, a pacifist sheet. In 1916–17 she contributed to Sébastien Faure's review Ce qu’il faut dire. In April 1918 she published L'École laïque menacée, and undertook a lecture tour in Lyon, Saint-Étienne, Firminy and Saint-Chamond. On her return to Épône she was charged with defeatist propaganda, but the charges were dropped with the armistice.

=== Post-war ===
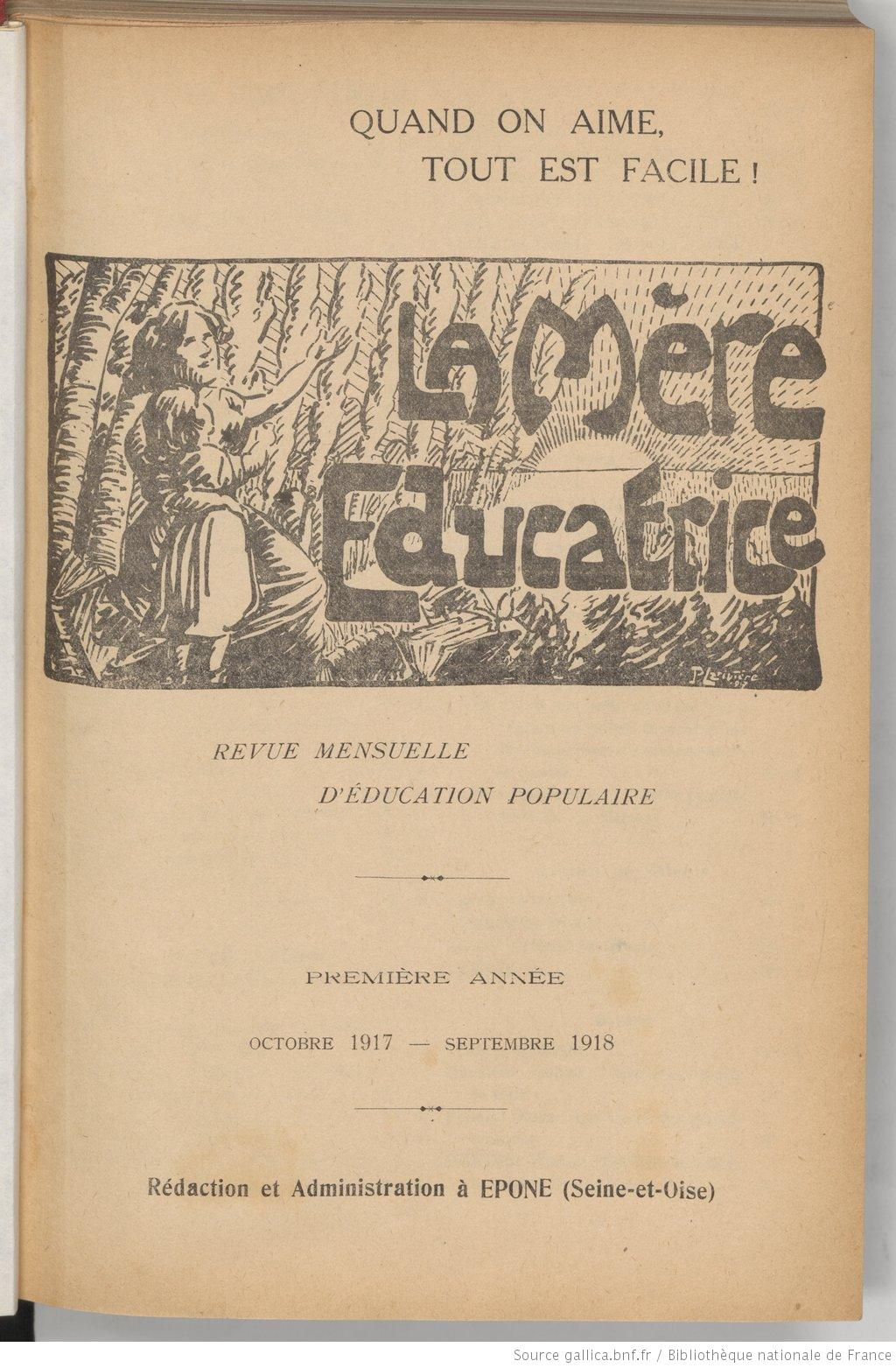
Compilation of the first year's issues of La mère éducatrice October 1917 - September 1918

Like other feminists at the time, Madeleine Vernet associated feminism, pacifism and maternity. She saw maternity as a source of happiness and fulfillment, and thought that a woman who gave life could only be hostile to war, which took life away. In October 1917 Madeleine Vernet founded La mère éducatrice, which she published until her death. The review promoted the mother-educator ideology and gave advice on hygiene to the "mothers of the people". The socialist and feminist Louise Bodin congratulated her, writing, "At the very dawn of life, there is mother and child, and, in a society not lost to egoism, vice and crime, everything should contribute to the veneration of the mother and child." In October 1919 Mère Educatrice changed its subtitle from "popular education review" to "family education review".

Writing in La mère éducatrice in 1919, Vernet denounced hypocrisy towards maternity, which she said was particularly notable with unwed mothers, since maternity outside marriage was considered a degradation. The "repopulators" who wanted to build up France after her huge losses during the war often thought it was immoral to help unwed mothers. Vernet argued that on the contrary the state should assist unwed mothers, and wanted maternity to be recognized as a real job. However, unlike other feminists she was not in favor of state compensation for maternity. Her collaborators include Nelly Roussel, Louise Bodin and Hélène Brion, all radical feminists. Vernet insisted that men should be responsible for the financial support of their children, writing in response to Madeleine Pelletier that "free love is not liberating for women."

Madeleine Vernet founded the Ligue des femmes contre la guerre (League of Women against War) in Paris in 1921, with about 500 members at time of creation. She continued her educational work in the orphanage at Épône for a while. By 1922 the majority of the board of directors of the orphanage were Communist. Vernet disagreed with their views, and in January 1923 resigned as director. She became involved in education of mothers, feminism and pacifism. In 1928 Madeleine Vernet was secretary general of the Comité international d’action et propagande pour la paix et le désarmement (International Committee of action and propaganda for peace and disarmament). The committee's organ was La volonté de paix (Will for Peace), which she had founded in June 1927 and was published until January 1936. The journal was banned when her husband Louis Tribier was tried for provoking military disobedience. In April 1935 Vernet was elected to the steering committee of the Internal League of Fighters for Peace (Ligue internationale des combattants de la paix).

Madeleine Vernet retired to Levallois-Perret, where she died on 5 October 1949. She is buried in the cemetery of Barentin, Seine-Inférieure.

== See also ==
- List of peace activists

== Publications ==
Publications by Vernet included:

- Madeleine Vernet (1906), L'Avenir social, société philanthropique d'éducation mixte et laïque, Paris: Impr. "l'Émancipatrice", p. 7
- Madeleine Vernet (1911), L'Avenir social : cinq années d'expérience éducative [1906-1911], Préfacier : Marie Bonnevial, Marcel Sembat, Épone: Édition de "L'Avenir social, p. 56
- Madeleine Vernet (1911), Les Sans-famille du prolétariat organisé (Publié auparavant dans la "Revue socialiste", 15 août 1911), Préfaces d'Albert Thomas et Georges Yvetot., Epône (Seine-et-Oise): l'Avenir Social, p. 20
- Madeleine Vernet (1913), Le Problème de l'alcoolisme (2 ed.), Paris: La Rénovatrice, p. 23
- Madeleine Vernet (1920), L'Amour libre, Épone: Édition de "L'Avenir social", p. 57)
- Madeleine Vernet (1921), Choix de poésies sociales et philosophiques des auteurs classiques, modernes et contemporains (Anthologie populaire), vol. I : Pages contre la guerre, Épone: Éditions de "L'Avenir social", p. 155)
- Madeleine Vernet (1921), Tous les métiers, pièce-revue en 1 acte, sur des chansons de Maurice Bouchor... [Saint-Denis, l'Avenir social, 9 mars 1912.], Épone: Éditions de "L'Avenir social", p. 36)
- Colonel Converset (1921), Ceux qui font la guerre et Ceux qui la font faire, preface by Madeleine Vernet, Epone: S.-et-O. : éditions de l'Avenir social, p. 60
- Madeleine Vernet (1925), L'amour libre (Nouvelle ed.), Paris: Groupe de propagande par la brochure, p. 14)
- Madeleine Vernet (1929), Le Rameau d'olivier, contes pour la paix (Collection de "La Mère éducatrice". Bibliothèque pour l'enfance et la jeunesse), preface by Félicien Challaye, Images et dessins de Sarah Menant, Levallois-Perret: Éditions de "La Mère éducatrice", p. 216
- Madeleine Vernet (1930), De l'objection de conscience au désarmement : les thèses de la volonté de paix, Levallois-Perret / Paris: Éd. de "La volonté de paix", p. 36
- Madeleine Vernet (1931), La Nouvelle équipe : roman de la guerre et de la paix, Levallois-Perret / Paris: Éd. de la Mère éducatrice, p. 392
- Madeleine Vernet (1933), L'Arc-en-ciel, contes pour la réconciliation (Collection de "La Mère éducatrice". Bibliothèque pour l'enfance et la jeunesse), Preface by Michel Corday, Illustrations by Pierre Rossi, avec 2 estampes de Rouen de H. Madelaine, Levallois-Perret: Éditions de "La Mère éducatrice", p. 224
- Madeleine Vernet (1933), Contes et chansons pour la paix. Illustrations de Pierre Rossi, Levallois-Perret: Éditions de "La Mère éducatrice", p. 128
- Madeleine Vernet (1936), Poèmes de l'éternelle amante, Rouen: Les amis de M. Vernet, p. 287
- Madeleine Vernet (1937), Maître Calvet, roman du terroir normand, Levallois-Perret / Rouen: La Mère éducatrice / H. Defontaine, p. 237
- Jeanne Lavergne; Madeleine Vernet (c. 1938), Nous les mères, la guerre et nos enfants, Rabat: F. Moncho, p. 36
- Madeleine Vernet (1938), Le Rameau d'olivier, preface by Félicien Challaye, Saint-Amand / Levallois-Perret: impr. Ch.-A. Bédu / Éditions de la Mère éducatrice, p. 216
- Madeleine Vernet (1947), Célestin Planchout, roman, Rouen: l'auteur, p. 327

Other publications include:

- Madeleine Vernet (1917), Une belle conscience et une sombre affaire (clandestine brochure dedicated to Hélène Brion)
- Madeleine Vernet (1921), Pages contre la guerre
- Madeleine Vernet, Berceuse pour le p'tit gars (song that appeared in the Bulletin de la Ruche, no. 4)
- Madeleine Vernet, Encyclopédie anarchiste (articles on: Mère, Orphelinat)

== Sources ==
- Ayoub, Josiane Boulad (1996). Former un nouveau peuple?: pouvoir, éducation, révolution (in French). Presses Université Laval. ISBN 978-2-7637-7451-0.
- Cova, Anne (2012-11-12). "French feminism and maternity: theories and policies, 1890-1918". Maternity and Gender Policies: Women and the Rise of the European Welfare States, 1880-1950s. Routledge. ISBN 978-1-135-08167-6.
- Fraisse, Geneviève. (1976). "Et si les mères désertaient la guerre.. Madeleine Vernet (1879-1949) : pacifisme et féminisme". Cahiers du GRIF (in French). 14 (14–15, Violence): 34–38. doi:10.3406/grif.1976.1119.
- Grayzel, Susan R. (1999). Women's Identities at War: Gender, Motherhood, and Politics in Britain and France During the First World War. UNC Press Books. ISBN 978-0-8078-4810-4.
- Gubin, Eliane (2004). Le siècle des féminismes (in French). Editions de l'Atelier. ISBN 978-2-7082-3729-2.
- Hollander, Neil (2013-12-27). Elusive Dove: The Search for Peace During World War I. McFarland. ISBN 978-0-7864-7891-0.
- Lenoir, Hugues (3–9 July 2014). "Madeleine Vernet". Le Monde Libertaire (in French).
- Madeleine Vernet (1878-1949) (in French), BnF: Bibliothèque nationale de France
- "Madeleine Vernet, une référence humaniste" (in French). Ville d'Épône.
- Roberts, Mary Louise (2009-02-15). Civilization without Sexes: Reconstructing Gender in Postwar France, 1917-1927. University of Chicago Press. ISBN 978-0-226-72127-9.
- R.D. (2012-09-13). "VERNET Madeleine [CAVELIER Madeleine, Eugénie, Clémentine, Victorine, dite]". Dictionnaire international des militants anarchistes (in French).
