= Marie Mayoux =

French teacher and activist (1878–1969)

- Born: Marie Gouranchat; 24 April 1878; Charente, France
- Died: 16 June 1969 (aged 91)
- Occupation: Teacher
- Known for: Activism

Marie Mayoux (French pronunciation: [maʁi maju]; née Gouranchat; 24 April 1878 – 16 June 1969) was a French teacher, revolutionary syndicalist, pacifist and libertarian. She and her husband François Mayoux were imprisoned during World War I for their pacifist activities.

== Life ==
=== Early years ===
Marie Gouranchat was born in Charente on 24 April 1878. Marie and her husband François Mayoux became school teachers in Charente, then in the Bouches-du-Rhône. They joined the Fédération nationale des Syndicats d'institutrices et instituteurs publics, the national federation of teacher's unions. In 1915 Marie and François Mayoux joined the socialist Section Française de l'Internationale Ouvrière (SFIO).

=== World War I ===
At the start of World War I (1914–18) many teachers were mobilized and others supported the war effort, but later a strong pacifist movement developed among them. Marie and François Mayoux were hardline pacifists, opposed to the Union sacrée. Marie Mayoux called a pacifist meeting at the teachers' union office in June 1915. She wrote a "Manifesto of the teachers union", dated 1 July 1915 and signed by the section of the Charente, the union of the Bouches-du-Rhône and activists of eleven departments. This was one of the first collective statements of opposition to the war by the teacher's federation. On 15 August 1915 a pacifist resolution was presented at the CGT's national congress at the initiative of Alphonse Merrheim and Albert Bourderon, signed by several militants of the federation of teacher's unions including Bouet, Fernand Loriot, Louis Lafosse, Marie Guillot, Marie Mayoux, Marthe Bigot and Hélène Brion. The resolution said "this war is not our war" and laid responsibility on the leaders of the belligerent states. The resolution denounced the union sacrée and called for the restoration of liberty.

A new international socialist conference at Kienthal was arranged by the Swiss for the end of April 1916. Merrheim, Bourderon and Marie Mayoux of the teacher's federation were expected to represent France, but they were refused the passports they needed to travel. Marie and François Mayoux were listed on Carnet B as activists. On 25 May 1917 they published a pacifist brochure Les instituteurs syndicalistes et la guerre (Syndicalist Teachers and the War). For this they were fined heavily and sentenced to two years in prison.

=== Later years ===
Marie Mayoux was released on 1 April 1919 after ten months in prison. François was kept in prison until the amnesty that preceded the national elections of 14 November 1919. They had lost their teacher's certificates, which were not reinstated until 1924. The Mayouxes left the SFIO in November 1919, and after the Tours Congress they joined the new French section of the Third International, the Communist Party. Just before the Marseille congress in November 1921 the Mayouxes and others submitted a statement that asserted that the unions should be free from party influence. It said, "the revolutionary direct action of the unions can be promoted only by the work of unionists." They were expelled at the Party congress held in Paris from 16–19 October 1922 as "unrepentant syndicalists". François Mayoux said the reason was that they defended the autonomy of trade unions from the party and sympathized with the Russian workers' Opposition.

Marie and François Mayoux joined the libertarians and contributed to various anarchist journals, including La Revue Anarchiste, La Voix Libertaire, CQFD, Défense de l'Homme and Le Monde Libertaire. In 1929 they were expelled from the Confédération générale du travail unitaire (CGTU). They dedicated themselves to an independent teachers' union that they had founded, and a modest bulletin called Notre point de vue (Our Point of View) that they published from 1923 to 1936. They continued to be activists, supporting the Spanish revolution and denouncing the Stalinist abuses. After World War II (1939–45) they retired to La Ciotat.

François Mayoux died in 1967. Marie Mayoux died on 16 June 1969 at the age of 91. Their child, the surrealist poet Jehan Mayoux, survived his parents. He had followed their example and refused to fight in World War II. A primary school, the École primaire Marie et François Mayoux in Dignac, Charente, is named after the couple.

== Publications ==
- Marie Mayoux; François Mayoux (1917). Fédération nationale des Syndicats d'institutrices et d'instituteurs publics. Les instituteurs syndicalistes et la guerre. Section de la Charente (in French). Fédération nationale des Syndicats d'institutrices et d'instituteurs publics.
- Marie Mayoux; François Mayoux (1918). Le Propagande pacifiste pendant la guerre : Notre affaire ... (in French). Epône [S. et O.] : L'Avenir social.

== Sources ==
- Avrane, Colette (2003-06-05). "Hélène Brion, une institutrice féministe". Archives du Féminisme (in French). Archived from the original on 2014-12-13.
- "Biographie de M. et F. Mayoux". Ecole primaire Marie et François Mayoux - Dignac. Archived from the original on 2014-12-19.
- Chuzeville, Julien (2012). Fernand Loriot: le fondateur oublié du Parti communiste. Harmattan. p. 21. ISBN 978-2-336-00119-7.
- Guérin, Daniel (1984-08-23). "Marie et François Mayoux, Instituteurs pacifistes et syndicalistes" (PDF). Bataille socialiste (in French).
- Jacquier, Charles (1994). "André Bösiger, Souvenirs d'un rebelle: Marie et François Mayoux, Instituteurs pacifistes et syndicalistes, introduction de Daniel Guérin, postface de Madeleine Rebérioux". Mil Neuf Cent. 12 (12): 248–253.
- "Marie et François Mayoux". Ephéméride Anarchiste (in French). Archived from the original on 2015-04-22.
- Riddell, John, ed. (2011-10-14). "Trade Unions". Toward the United Front: Proceedings of the Fourth Congress of the Communist International, 1922. BRILL. ISBN 978-90-04-20778-3.
