= Kienthal Conference =

International conference of socialists

- Begins: April 24, 1916
- Ends: April 30, 1916
- Location: Kienthal
- Country: Switzerland
- Previous event: Zimmerwald Conference
- Next event: Stockholm Conference

The Kienthal Conference (also known as the Second Zimmerwald Conference) was held in the Swiss village of Kienthal, between April 24 and 30, 1916. Like its 1915 predecessor, the Zimmerwald Conference, it was an international conference of socialists who opposed the First World War.

== Background ==
The conference had been called by an Enlarged Session of the International Socialist Commission (ISC) in February 1916. The reasons for a second conference included the opposition that the International Socialist Bureau was putting up against the Zimmerwald movement, the opposition of the bourgeois nationalists and the "gradually maturing plans for peace".

== Delegates ==
The following delegates participated in the conference:

=== Entente countries ===
- Serbian Social Democratic Party - Triša Kaclerović
- Anti-war opposition within the French Socialist Party - SFIO - Pierre Brizon, Jean Pierre Raffin-Dugens, Alexandre Blanc, Henri Guilbeaux (editor of Demain)
- Italian Socialist Party - Oddino Morgari, Costantino Lazzari, Elia Musati, Giuseppe Modigliani, Giacinto Serrati, Camillo Prampolini, Enrico Dugani
- Portuguese Socialist Party - Edmondo Peluso

==== Russian Empire ====
- Central Committee of the Russian Social Democratic Workers Party (Bolsheviks) - Vladimir Lenin, Gregory Zinoviev, Inessa Armand
- Organization Committee of the Russian Social Democratic Workers Party (Mensheviks) - Julius Martov, Pavel Axelrod
- Socialist-Revolutionary Party - Mark Natanson (using the pseudonym Bobrov), Vlasov, Savelev
- Regional Presidium of the Social Democracy of the Kingdom of Poland and Lithuania- Karl Radek, Mieczyslaw Bronski, Bronislaw Stein
- Main Presidium of the Social Democracy of the Kingdom of Poland and Lithuania - Adolf Warski
- Polish Socialist Party – Left - Lapinski

=== Neutral countries ===
- Swiss Social Democratic Party - Fritz Platten, Ernst Nobs, Paul Graber, Agnes Robmann

=== Central Powers ===
- Anti-war opposition within the Social Democratic Workers Party of German Austria - Franz Koritschoner
- Anti-war opposition within the Social Democratic Party of Germany - Adolph Hoffman, Hermann Fleisher of the "Ledebour-Haase" group, Bertha Thalheimer, Ernst Meyer of the Internationale group, and Paul Frölich of the Bremen Radical group.

=== International ===
- The ISC was represented by - Robert Grimm, Charles Naine, Oddino Morgari and Angelica Balabanoff.
- Socialist Youth International - Willi Münzenberg

A number of delegates named by groups in Great Britain, the Netherlands, Austria, Bulgaria, Romania, Sweden, Norway and by the General Jewish Labour Bund in Lithuania, Poland and Russia were unable to attend. Additionally, the Revolutionary Socialist League of the Netherlands had transferred its mandate to Radek and the Social-Democracy of the Lettish Territory had transferred its mandate to Zinoviev. A Lithuanian group around the magazine Social-Democratas in London tried to affiliate with the Zimmerwald Left and authorized Jan Antonovich Berzin to sign a draft manifesto of left-wing delegates for them, but he had already transferred his mandate to Zinoviev and their vote was "lost". A member of the Independent Labour Party was present as a "guest".

== The beginning of the Conference ==
The delegates met at the small Swiss village of Kienthal at the foot of the Blüemlisalp from April 24 to 30, 1916. Portuguese delegate Edmondo Peluso gave a very detailed account:

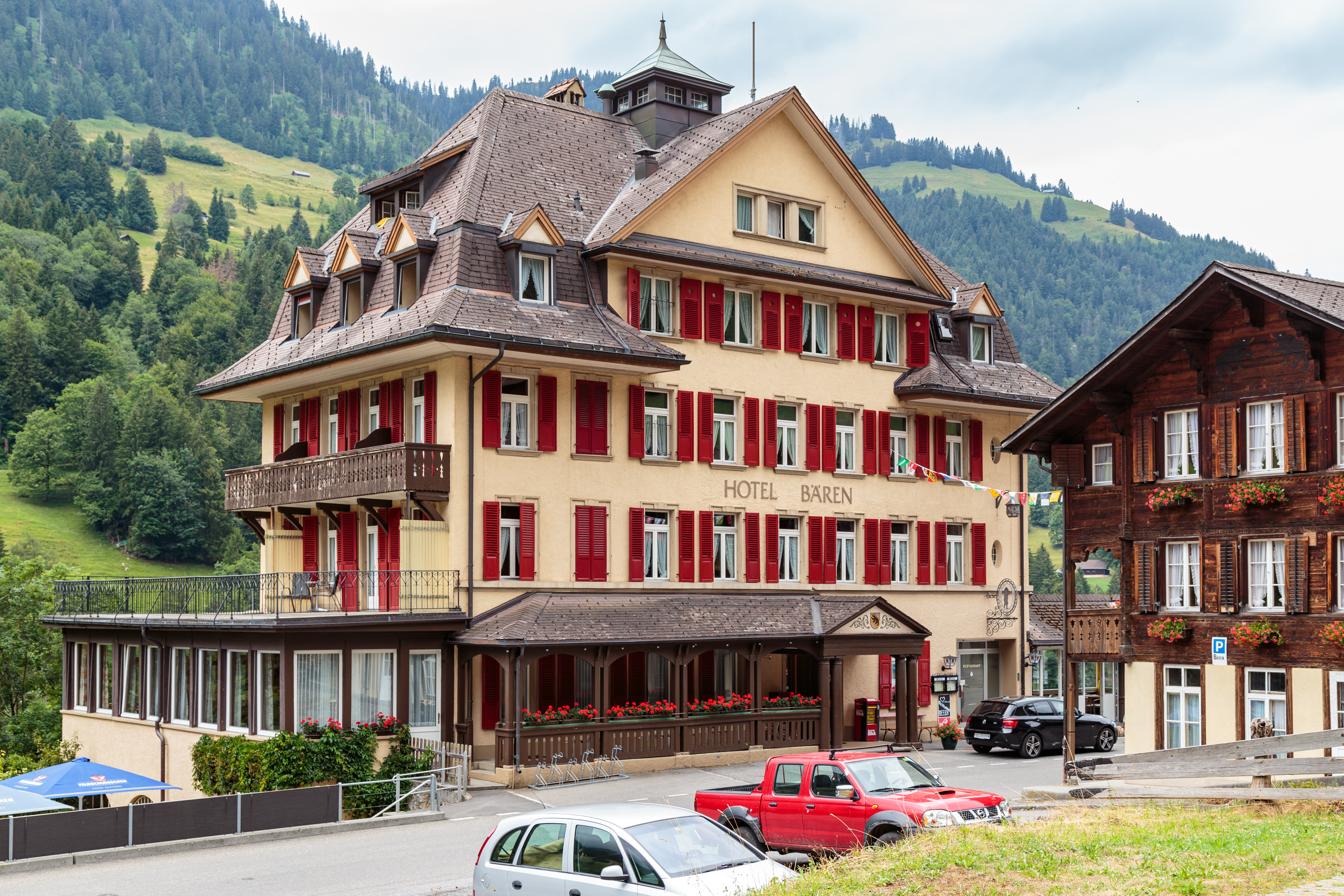
Hotel Bären in Kiental

The spacious dining room of the Hotel Baren was transformed into conference chamber. The presidents chair was in the center and, as behooved an international conference, the Presidium consisted of a German, a Frenchmen, an Italian and a Serb. Two tables for the delegates were placed on either side and perpendicularly to the presidents table. These the right and the left, exactly as in parliaments. The Italian delegation, being very numerous, took their seats at another table in front of the president.

The conference began with a speech by Robert Grimm, chairman of the ISC, on the work of the Commission. In order to save time it was decided that oral reports would only be heard by delegates of Germany and France. Hoffman gave the first report, representing Germany. Pierre Brizon began his speech with the statement "Comrades, though I am an internationalist, I am still a Frenchman...I will not utter one word, nor will I make any gesture which might injure France, France, the land of the Revolution" He then turned to Hoffman and told him to inform Kaiser Wilhelm that France would gladly exchange Madagascar for the return of Alsace-Lorraine. Brizons speech lasted several hours, was interrupted by him drinking coffee and eating and included at least two attempts to physically assault him. Finally, he declared that he would vote against all war credits - which brought forth a great applause - and then added "but only once hostile troops leave France" which resulted in the second of the aforementioned assault attempts. He then offered a text of a draft manifesto that included, among other things, all of the criticisms that were being made against him and the French opportunists. None of the controversy around Brizons speech was reported in the official proceedings of the conference, but is recorded in the memoirs of Guilbeaux.

== Documents ==
Unlike the first conference, the manifesto did not engender much controversy and the text presented by Brizon as modified by a Commission was accepted unanimously. The manifesto stated that the war was caused by imperialism and militarism and would only end when all countries abolished their own militarism. While repeating the Zimmerwald Conferences condemnation of bourgeois governments, parties and press, it also criticized the social patriots and bourgeois pacifists and stated categorically that the only way wars would end was if the working class took power and abolished private property.

=== International Socialist Bureau ===
The major debate revolved around resolutions on the proletarian "peace policy" and the attitude toward the International Socialist Bureau, particularly in the event of its reconvening. With respect to the latter, three opinions emerged at the beginning of debate: the view of the Zimmerwald Left that the ISB was entirely discredited and focus should be on laying the groundwork for a Third International, though they did not rule out the possibility of attending the ISB in order to "tear the masks from their social chauvinist faces"; the view of some, like Pavel Axelrod, who wished for the Zimmerwaldists to try and win over more of the elements within the ISB, and therefore did not advocate calling a meeting of the Bureau, but did not rule out participation; and a tendency represented by the Italians that claimed the ISB could be "conquered" if reconvened with the participation of South African, Japanese, Australian and even Indian delegates, and therefore advocated calling a meeting of the Bureau.

A commission was elected to try to settle the issue. The commission consisted of Pavel Axelrod, Adolf Hoffman, Constantino Lazzari, Lenin, Charles Naine, Adolf Warski and an unnamed "German of the Internationale group". Two drafts came out of this commission. The majority endorsed by Axelrod, Hoffmann, Lazzari, and Naine called for the meeting of the ISB so that a new Executive Committee could be elected from socialists of the neutral countries; that all sections of the International expel members who entered into cabinets of belligerent countries; that all parliamentary representatives of sections of the International vote against war credits; civil peace be broken and class struggle resumed; and all sections should use "all means" to hasten a peace without annexations or indemnities on the basis of national self-determination.

After debate in the conference a vote was taken: 10 votes for the majority report of the commission; 12 for the minority report of the Zimmerwald Left; a new draft introduced by Lapinski, 15; another draft by Hoffman favoring calling the Bureau, 2; a draft by Serrati "approximately the same as the majority report" 10; and a draft by Zinoviev, 19. After this poll the resolutions were handed back to the commission, which now included Zinoviev and Nobs. This commission hammered out a compromise based on Lapinkis draft. Zinoviev called it the "Lapinski-Zinoviev-Modigliani draft...with amendments" and noted that the Italians gave an ultimatum reserving individual parties the right to call for a session of the Bureau. Though the official report claimed that the vote in favor of this resolution was unanimous, Zinoviev claimed in his report that Axelrod abstained and Dugoni voted against.

The final document condemned the Executive Committee of the ISB for not carrying out the resolutions of past Socialist Congresses; not calling a session of the Bureau despite demands for it from various parties; having the Chairman of the ISB (Emile Vandervelde) serve in a belligerent cabinet, thus making the ISB a tool of an "imperialist coalition"; its amicable relations with "social patriotic" parties and opposition to the Zimmerwald movement. The resolution did note, however, that under the pressure of the "growing indignation of the masses" the Executive Committee was examining the possibility of holding a session of the ISB. A session called under these circumstances, however, might be made to serve the interest of either or both imperialist coalition. Therefore, the resolution demanded the Zimmerwald parties to "watch carefully all the activities of the Executive Committee of the International Socialist Bureau". The resolution further stated that the International could recover its political power only if it liberated itself from imperialist and chauvinist influences and resumed class struggle and mass action. If a plenum of the ISB should be called those Zimmerwaldist parties participating had to use the opportunity to expose the real intentions of the social patriots, while reaffirming the fundamental principles of the International. Two annexes provided for a meeting of the Enlarged Committee of the ISC should a plenary session of the ISB be called, to discuss joint action by the Zimmerwaldists. A second reaffirmed each individual parties right to call a session of the ISB on its own volition.

=== Peace Policy ===
There is some disagreement on the number of draft resolutions for a peace policy initially presented to the conference. The conferences official report states that three resolutions were presented: those of Robert Grimm, of the Zimmerwald Left and the German Internationale group. However, another source states that the third draft was one drafted by Lenin and the Central Committee of the RSDLP, and that there was a heated disagreement between Bolsheviks and other members of the Zimmerwald Left over the conception of national self-determination, as well as disarmament and the "arming of the people". In any event the "Left Zimmerwald" draft was endorsed by Lenin, Zinoviev and Armand on behalf of the Central Committee of the RSDLP, as well as Radek, Bronski and Dobrowski of Poland, "one delegate from town X" of the German Opposition, Platten, Nobs, Robmann, Kaclerovic, and Serrati. The Zimmerwald Left draft stated that imperialist rivalry was the cause of the war and that plans developed by the opportunists and "social pacifists" such as a United States of Europe, disarmament, compulsory courts of arbitration etc. only deceived the masses because they gave the illusion of a "capitalism without war". The revolutionary struggle would arise out of the misery of the masses and the unification of a number of struggles - such as abolishing imperialist debts, unemployed movements, republicanism, repudiating annexations, liberating colonies and "abolishing state boundaries" - into a single struggle for political power, socialism and the "unification of socialist peoples." The peace program of social democracy was for the proletariat to turn their weapons on their common enemy - the capitalist governments.

The German Internationale groups draft, which also dealt with the ISB question, likewise blamed the war on imperialism and listed the various ways the war had immersirated the German proletariat. It set out a program of practical action against the war and the pro-war socialist parties that included refusal to vote for war credits, war tax resistance and the utilization of every organizational and parliamentary opportunity to harass and criticize the pro-war majority socialists and government in order to arouse the masses to action. It also encouraged particular attention toward propaganda among women, youth and the unemployed, who were particularly affected or radicalized by the war. The draft resolution also took a very firm line against the official party and unions, urging a clear socialist reformation from below to restore the party to its original principles and the party bureaucracy replaced by functionaries responsible to the membership. Every "crisis" or dislocation caused by the war was to be used to develop class conscientiousness and a revolutionary situation.

While the delegates were in broad agreement on the causes of the war, the fact that the proletariat must take an active role in struggle against war and for peace, and condemnation of "bourgeois" peace schemes, there was disagreement on what exact measures the working class should take to end the war. They also agreed that the resolution should be more detailed in its reasons for taking its position, so as not to allow false interpretations. When the question was sent to a commission, there was further debate on the merits of such reforms as international arbitration and disarmament. While all agreed that these reforms could not abolish imperialist-rooted war, others felt they might have some use as ameliorative measures. When these measures could not be resolved in commission they were sent back to the conference plenum. However, the plenum never got around to discussing the issue and when the time came to vote on a peace declaration a number of different declarations were submitted. Because there was fundamental agreement on most issue and the delegates felt an exhaustive debate over every detail was unnecessary a resolution based on the Grimm draft was then unanimously adopted. The commission also received a lengthy and ponderous draft manifesto submitted by Axelrod, Martov and Lapinski on behalf of the Mensheviks and the Polish Socialist Party - Left which mostly dealt with post-war plans for supranational government schemes and why bourgeois attempts would continue the regime of imperialism while a "complete economic and political unification of all civilized nations" should be the chief tasks of socialists once the proletariat had taken power and abolished private property.

The resolution finally adopted stated categorically that the war was a consequence of bourgeois property relations which had produced a series of imperialist antagonisms. The war would not end the capitalist economy or imperialism so therefore it would not do away with the causes of future wars. Schemes such as courts of international arbitration, disarmament and the democratization of foreign policy could not end wars, as long as the capitalist system existed. "The struggle for lasting peace can, therefore, be only a struggle for the realization of socialism" (emphasis in the original). On the basis of the Stuttgart, Copenhagen and Basel resolutions the delegates declared that it is a vital commandment to raise a call for an immediate truce and peace negotiations. The workers would succeed in hastening the end of the war and influencing the nature of the peace only to the extent that this call finds a response within the international proletariat and led them to "forceful action directed toward overthrowing the capitalist class." The proletariat also must struggle against annexations and attempts to create "pseudo-independent states" on the "pretext of liberating oppressed peoples". Socialists did not oppose annexations in order to return to the pre-1914 borders but because "...socialism strives to eliminate all national oppression by means of an economic and political unification of the peoples on a democratic basis, something which cannot be realized within the limits of capitalist states." So long as socialism has not achieved this, the proletariat's duty was still to oppose national oppression, attacks on weaker states, war indemnities, support the protection of minorities, and the autonomy of peoples on a "basis of real democracy". Finally, socialists should take advantage of mass movements originating in the dislocations of the war, such as unemployed movements and protest against the high cost of living and unite them into one international struggle for socialism.

=== Declaration of Sympathy ===
As at Zimmerwald, the Kienthal conference passed a resolution of sympathy for its "persecuted" comrades. It stated that there have been repressions in Russia, Germany, France, England and even neutral Switzerland and that these repression belie the stated objectives of a "war for liberation" and that these were inspiring examples of revolutionaries who fought social patriotism as much as the policy of their governments. The resolution particularly condemned the persecution of the Jews in Russia and greeted the French and German women who were being released from captivity. It urged the affiliated organization to follow the example of the persecuted comrades to continue to stir up discontent and hasten the overthrow of capitalism.

== The Commission ==
Interspersed within the debates, the ISC presented a financial statement to the conference.

=== Financial Statement ===
	Francs
Income	5,209.73
Expense	4,517.35
Balance	0692.38

=== Income ===
Income sources	Francs
Affiliated parties	3,478.30
Local groups and individuals	1,553.65
Total	5,031.95

=== Expenses ===
	Francs
Publishing the Bulletin	2,950.90
Postage and general expen.	988.50
First conference	4,238.65
Total	Example

The Commission reminded the conference that they received no compensation, even for translation services.

== See also ==
- Neutral Socialist Conferences during the First World War
- Third Zimmerwald Conference
