= Ceton =

- Commune
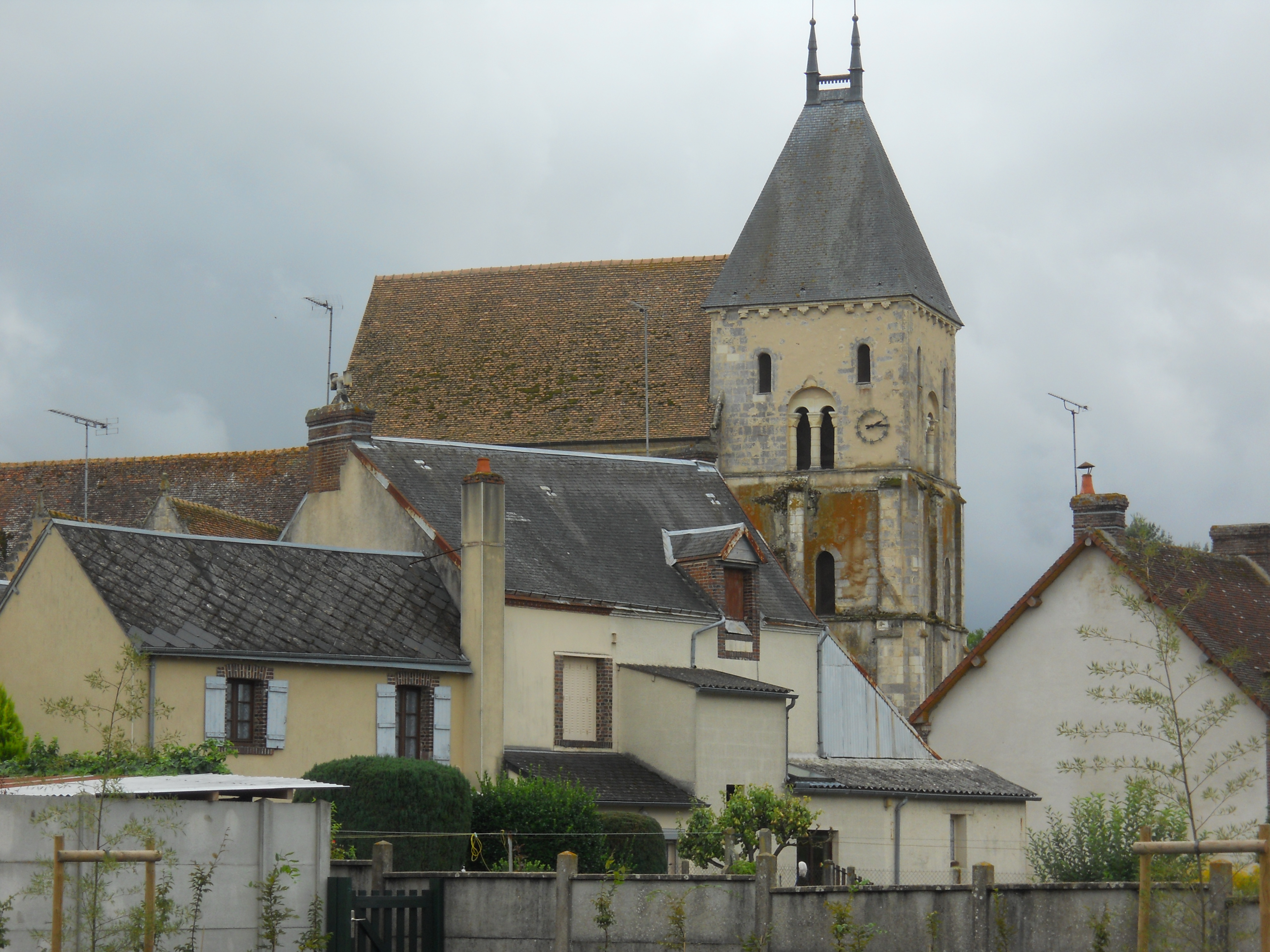
- The church in Ceton

- Coat of arms
- Location of Ceton
- Location within France Location within Normandy
- Coordinates: 48°13′37″N 0°45′03″E
- Country: France
- Region: Normandy
- Department: Orne
- Arrondissement: Mortagne-au-Perche
- Canton: Ceton
- Intercommunality: Collines du Perche Normand

Government
  - Mayor (2023–2026): André Besnier
- Area^{1}: 59.39 km^{2} (22.93 sq mi)
- Elevation: 130 m (430 ft)
- Highest elevation: 271 m (889 ft)
- Lowest elevation: 89 m (292 ft)
- Population (2023): 1,734
  - Density: 29.20/km^{2} (75.62/sq mi)
- Time zone: UTC+01:00 (CET)
  - Summer (DST): UTC+02:00 (CEST)
- INSEE/Postal code: 61079 /61260
- ^{1} French Land Register data, which excludes lakes, ponds, glaciers > 1 km^{2} (0.386 sq mi or 247 acres) and river estuaries.

Ceton (French pronunciation: [sətɔ̃]) is a commune in the Orne department in north-western France. It is the southernmost municipality in Normandy. The commune has the largest surface area of the communes based in the Orne, at 59.39 km ²

== Geography ==
The commune is made up of the following collection of villages and hamlets, Les Vignes, La Jâtière, Le Boulay, Neuville, Les Vaux Gomberts, Le Ménil, Les Pressoirs, Ceton, Les Goutiers, L'Aître, Le Grand Mont Gâteau, Les Rafouleries, Le Moulin de l'Aunay, Le Bas Mont Morant, Saint-Denis, Les Prouteries, La Davière and Les Ferrandières.

Two rivers the Huisne and la Maroisse flow through the commune. In addition the commune contains the source of the River Braye.

== Points of interest ==
=== National heritage sites ===
The Commune has three buildings and areas listed as a Monument historique.

- Beauvais Castle is a Percheron fortified house, which was registered as a monument in 1992.
- Saint-Pierre Church an eleventeenth century church, registered as a Monument historique in 1974.
- Manoir du Mont-Gâteau a manor house, registered as a Monument historique in 1992.

== Sport ==
Ceton has a public swimming pool the H2O Perche, which has been open since 2010.

== Notable people ==
- Fernand Loriot - (1870 – 1932) one of the founders of the French Communist Party, was born here.

== Heraldry ==
Arms of Ceton	The arms of Ceton are blazoned : Azure, a bend Or, and in chief a fleur de lys argent.

== Twin towns – sister cities ==
Ceton is twinned with:

- Neckarwestheim, Germany

== See also ==
- Communes of the Orne department
- Perche
