= Fernand Loriot =

French teacher, pacifist and communist (1870–1932)

- Born: 10 October 1870; Ceton, Orne, France
- Died: 12 October 1932 (aged 62)
- Occupation: Teacher
- Known for: Unionism, pacifism

Fernand Loriot (French pronunciation: [fɛʁnɑ̃ lɔʁjo]; 10 October 1870 – 12 October 1932) was a French teacher who was active in forming the teachers' union. He took a pacifist stance during World War I. He was one of the founders of the French Communist Party.

== Early years ==
Loriot was born on 10 October 1870 in Ceton, Orne. He became a member of the Socialist Party in 1901, and was an activist in the teachers' union.

He defied the courts and refused to dissolve the union when the government took action after the Congress of Chambéry.

As Louis Bouët recalled in L'école émancipée, after the Congress of Chambéry in 1912, the teachers' union was in turmoil and was being repressed by the authorities.

Loriot took the position of treasurer in the new federal board created by the Seine union. At the Congress of Bourges in 1913 Émile Glay, who had called on Pierre Laval for help as counsel for the Federation, said to André Léon Chalopin that nobody would be left in the Seine since their licence to teach would be revoked. From the back of the room came the voice of Loriot, who had been paying the delegates their railway allowance, saying, "You will not be alone, Chalopin: you can count on me."

== World War I ==
During World War I (July 1914 – November 1918) Loriot was caught up in the wave of patriotic socialists who joined the union sacrée, pledging to co-operate with the government. However, according to Marie Guillot, by January 1915, he had rejected the union sacrée and taken a pacifist position. In 1915, he was appointed treasurer of the Federation of Teachers' Unions and was appointed by the secretary Hélène Brion to the central committee.

He devoted much effort to fighting the nationalist unions that supported the war, along with Alphonse Merrheim, Albert Bourderon and Raymond Péricat.

He was one of the founders of the pacifist Committee for the Resumption of international relations, and he and Bourderon were the spokesmen for the committee.

In all trade union and socialist congresses, he supported the position of the Zimmerwald Conference. Loriot leaned towards the socialist rather than the syndicalist, side in the committee, but towards the end of his life, he moved towards syndicalism.

In February 1917, the Committee for the Resumption of International Relations split, with Jean Raffin-Dugens, Bourderon and Pierre Brizon joining the SFIO minority, led by Jean Longuet, and Loriot and fellow socialists Charles Rappoport, Louise Saumoneau and François Mayoux took control of the committee. Merrheim withdrew to concentrate on union work, and Loriot became secretary of the committee.

During the war, he contributed to the L'école émancipée, La Plèbe and the Journal du peuple.

== Later career ==
After the war, Loriot contributed to Vie ouvrière, the Bulletin communiste and L'Humanité. When the Committee for the Third International was established in 1919,.he was made secretary. His union activity caused him to be subject to "administrative measures" and dismissal from the teaching profession.

He was imprisoned in May 1920 for plotting against the security of the state and was held in prison for ten months. At the Tours Congress in December 1920 he was appointed a member of the Executive Committee of the newly-formed Communist Party and the international secretary.

In 1921, Loriot participated in the Third Congress of the Communist International in Moscow. After returning to France, he left politics for a period for reasons of health. After the "Bolshevisation" of the party in 1924, he became active in opposition to it in 1925.

He later left the party and in 1926, he joined the revolutionary syndicalist cause.

He died on 12 October 1932, at 62.

== See also ==
- List of peace activists

== Sources ==
- "Fernand Loriot". Communist Bulletin (32–33). July 1933.
- Monatte, Pierre (25 November 1932). "Une conscience: Fernand Loriot". La Révolution prolétarienne (140).
- Wohl, Robert (1966-01-01). French Communism in the Making, 1914–1924. Stanford University Press. p. 149. ISBN 978-0-8047-0177-8.
