= Franchesse =

- Commune
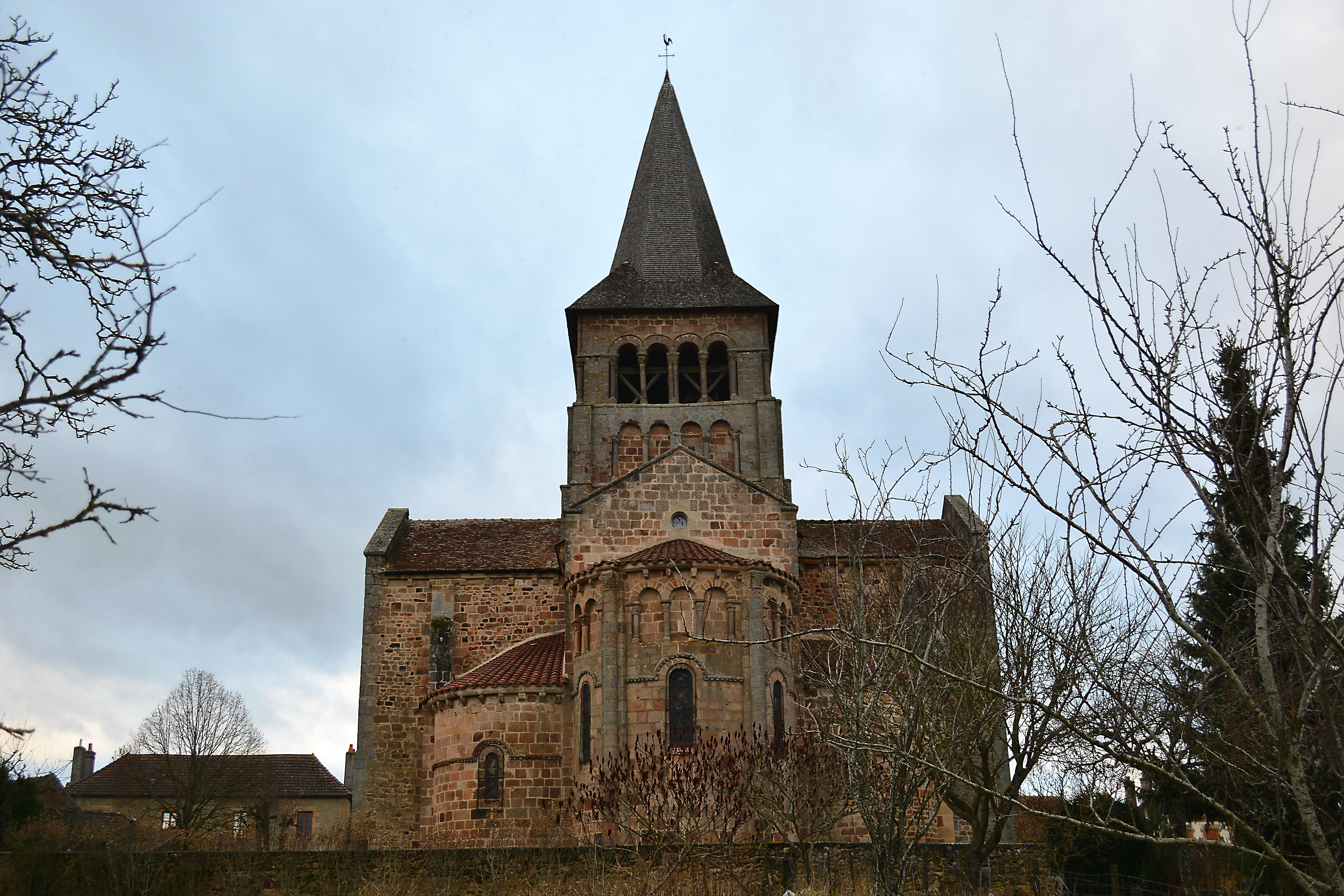
- The church in Franchesse
- Location of Franchesse
- Location within France Location within Auvergne-Rhône-Alpes
- Coordinates: 46°38′15″N 3°02′15″E
- Country: France
- Region: Auvergne-Rhône-Alpes
- Department: Allier
- Arrondissement: Moulins
- Canton: Bourbon-l'Archambault
- Intercommunality: Bocage Bourbonnais

Government
  - Mayor (2026–32): Gérard Vernis
- Area^{1}: 40.24 km^{2} (15.54 sq mi)
- Elevation: 319 m (1,047 ft)
- Highest elevation: 322 m (1,056 ft)
- Lowest elevation: 204 m (669 ft)
- Population (2023): 449
  - Density: 11.2/km^{2} (28.9/sq mi)
- Time zone: UTC+01:00 (CET)
  - Summer (DST): UTC+02:00 (CEST)
- INSEE/Postal code: 03117 /03160
- ^{1} French Land Register data, which excludes lakes, ponds, glaciers > 1 km^{2} (0.386 sq mi or 247 acres) and river estuaries.

Franchesse (French pronunciation: [fʁɑ̃ʃɛs]) is a commune in the Allier department in central France. The linguist Frantz Brunet (1879–1965) was born in Franchesse.

== Population ==
Historical population
Year	Pop.	±% p.a.
1968	675	—
1975	552	−2.83%
1982	539	−0.34%
1990	532	−0.16%
1999	451	−1.82%
2007	453	+0.06%
2012	456	+0.13%
2017	471	+0.65%
2023	449	−0.79%
Source: INSEE

== See also ==
- Communes of the Allier department
