= La volonté de paix =

La volonté de paix was a French magazine, which was the organ of the International Committee of Action and Propaganda for Peace and Disarmament. It was established in June 1927 by Madeleine Vernet. It ceased publication in January 1936, after being banned when Vernet's husband Louis Tribier was tried for provoking military disobedience.
