= Beaulieu-sur-Sonnette =

- Commune
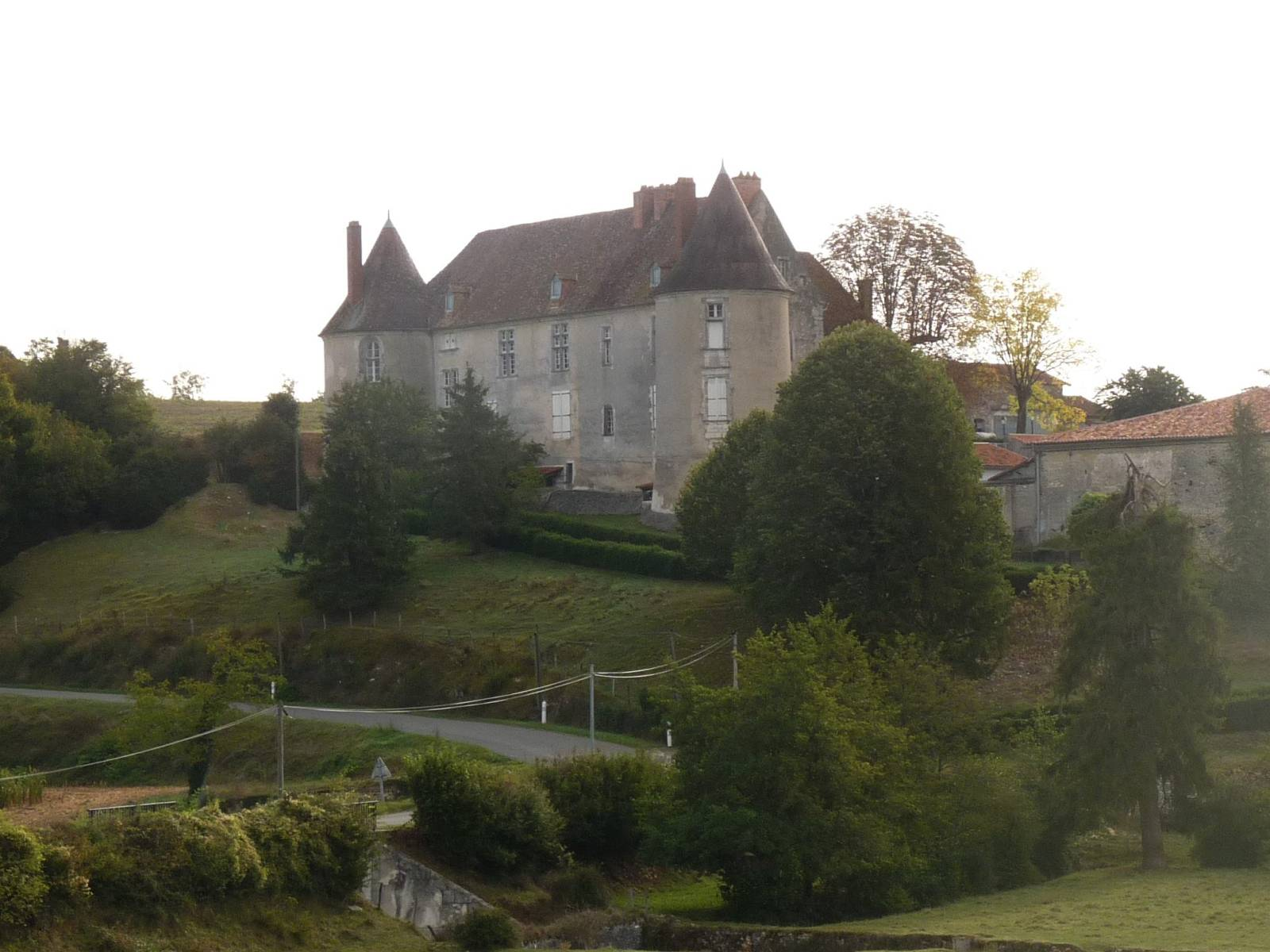
- Chateau of Sansac

- Coat of arms
- Location of Beaulieu-sur-Sonnette
- Location within France Location within Nouvelle-Aquitaine
- Coordinates: 45°55′31″N 0°23′04″E
- Country: France
- Region: Nouvelle-Aquitaine
- Department: Charente
- Arrondissement: Confolens
- Canton: Charente-Bonnieure
- Intercommunality: Charente Limousine

Government
  - Mayor (2020–2026): Francis Kleber Aime Porquet
- Area^{1}: 10.29 km^{2} (3.97 sq mi)
- Elevation: 102 m (335 ft)
- Highest elevation: 163 m (535 ft)
- Lowest elevation: 86 m (282 ft)
- Population (2023): 235
  - Density: 22.8/km^{2} (59.1/sq mi)
- Time zone: UTC+01:00 (CET)
  - Summer (DST): UTC+02:00 (CEST)
- INSEE/Postal code: 16035 /16450
- ^{1} French Land Register data, which excludes lakes, ponds, glaciers > 1 km^{2} (0.386 sq mi or 247 acres) and river estuaries.

Beaulieu-sur-Sonnette is a commune in the Charente department in southwestern France.

== Population ==
Historical population
Year	Pop.	±% p.a.
1968	448	—
1975	336	−4.03%
1982	326	−0.43%
1990	300	−1.03%
1999	269	−1.20%
2007	284	+0.68%
2012	254	−2.21%
2017	207	−4.01%
2023	235	+2.14%
Source: INSEE

== See also ==
- Communes of the Charente department
