= Carnet B =

Instrument for monitoring "suspects" under the French Third Republic

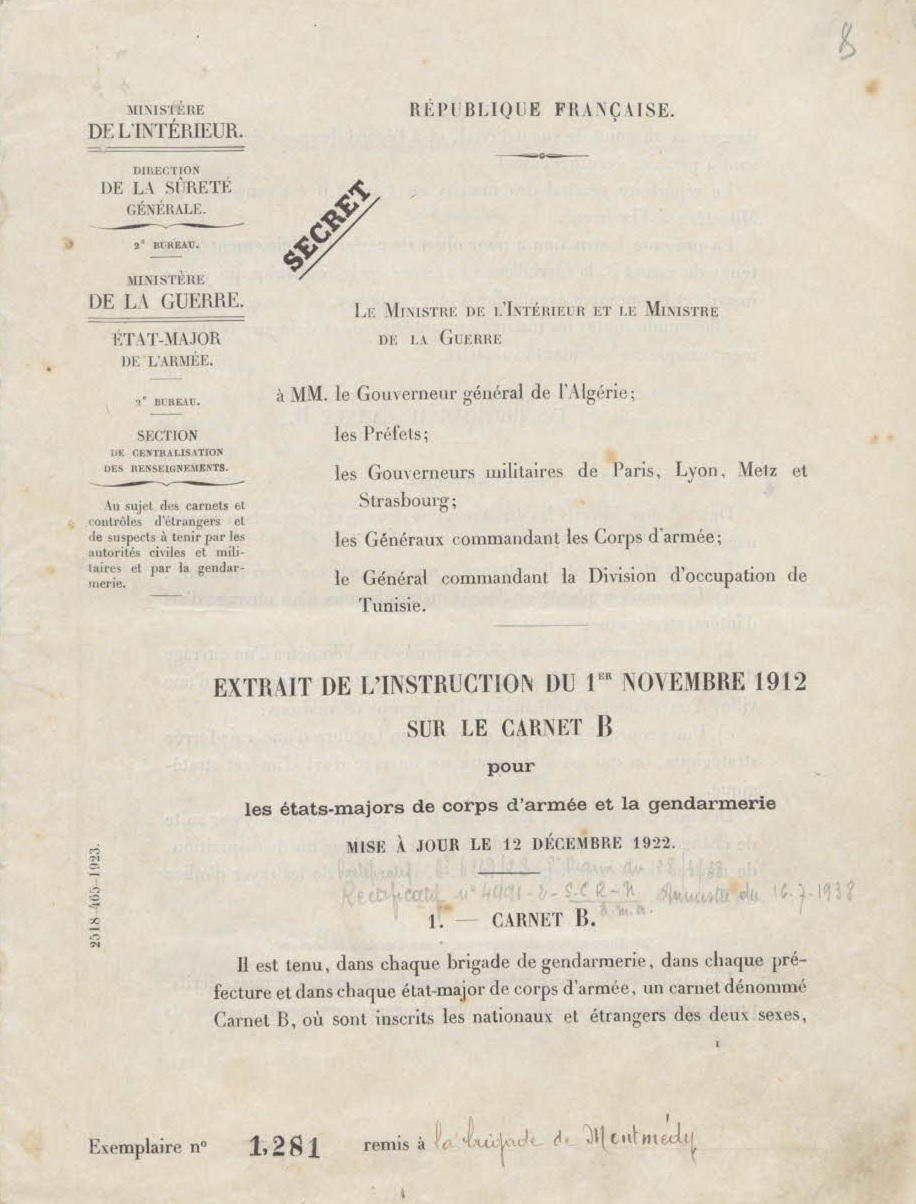
Excerpt from instructions on Carnet B for army corps staffs and the police, drawn up jointly by the Ministries of the Interior and of War, November 1912. National Archives of France.

Carnet B was a list of suspects kept by the French Third Republic government. It was created in 1886 by General Georges Ernest Boulanger to fight against espionage activities. Managed by the Ministry of the Interior, it was gradually extended to all individuals capable of disturbing public order or antimilitarists who could oppose national mobilization. On August 1, 1914, Interior Minister Louis Malvy decided not to implement it when the World War I broke out. At the end of the war, it was kept and taken back for general surveillance, especially of foreigners. It was repealed in 1947.
