= Marthe Bigot =

French feminist socialist (1878–1962)

- Marthe Bigot in 1921
- Born: 1878
- Died: 1962 (aged 83–84)
- Occupation: Teacher
- Known for: Feminism and Communism

Marthe Bigot (French: [maʁt biɡo]; 1878–1962) was a French primary schoolteacher, feminist, pacifist and communist.

== Early years ==
Marthe Bigot was born in 1878, the daughter of a baker. She became a primary schoolteacher in Paris.

In 1907 the International Socialist Conference of Stuttgart forbade socialist women from collaborating with "bourgeois" feminists. Bigot, Madeleine Pelletier and Hélène Brion resisted this decision. While belonging to the extreme left, they tried to maintain radical feminism. They took a pacifist position in World War I (1914–18). As an institutrice Bigot and other feminist teachers including Marthe Pichorel and Marie Guillot were investigated and strongly reprimanded for their pacifist attitudes. Bigot was not dismissed, as were Hélène Brion and Lucie Colliard. The Comité d'Action Suffragiste (CAS) was created in December 1917, directed by Jeanne Mélin, Marthe Bigot and Gabrielle Duchêne. The CAS organized meetings to which they tried to attract workers, for example by showing films. As well as agitating for women's suffrage, the CAS wanted to organize a referendum to end the fighting.

After 1917, the pacifist position was expressed in La Voix des femmes (the Voice of Women). La Voix des femmes had contributors with diverse views and did not have a purely feminist agenda, but it pursued a radical line. It was in favor of full equality of the sexes, of sexual emancipation, and of participation by women in political parties on the left. The masthead depicted a heroic woman worker beside a male co-revolutionary. As a bi-monthly the paper quickly achieved a circulation of almost 5,000 copies. It became the "loudest voice on the women's Left", and attracted the attention of the police. It became a daily paper in 1922, and continued to appear until 1939.

== Communist leader ==
At the Congress of Tours in December 1920 Bigot joined the French Communist Party (PCF) majority. She became the secretary of the 12th section of the French Section of the Workers' International (SFIO). She was also active in Feminist causes, demonstrating for the right to vote as a member of the Women's Committee for Permanent Peace and the Fédération Féministe Universitaire. She was removed from this position for her activity in 1921, and reinstated in 1924. She was secretary for women's propaganda for the PCF from 1920–24 and founder of the women's journal l'Ouvrière.

The second conference of the international women correspondents, formed by the Women's Secretariat of the International, met in Berlin on 24–25 October 1922. Bigot presented a report that showed the French Communist Party had been slow to recruit women. L'Ouvrière had a circulation of only 2,000 copies, and only 2% of the party's members were women. Writing in l'Ouvrière on 5 August 1922 Bigot said that employers who paid family allowance to men rather than direct to mothers were contributing to "the economic inferiority of the woman, placing her absolutely under the domination of her husband." The Confédération Générale du Travail (CGT) leader Martin Labe, however, was opposed to payments direct to wives, asking, "can we accept the infliction of this gratuitous insult to fathers who are breadwinners?"

Marthe Bigot left the Communist Party at the end of 1925 and joined the staff of the Révolution Prolétarienne directed by Pierre Monatte. She was part of the Marxist–Leninist circle of Boris Souvarine in 1927-28. She worked for the Trotskyist Review La Vérité (The Truth). She returned to the Communist Party and agitated for trade union unity. The party demanded civil and civic equality for women, but accused suffragist organizations of helping to maintain the bourgeois regime. Rosa Michel criticized Bigot for her support of women's suffrage, saying "the emancipation of women cannot be the work of a paper weapon." Bigot's last known article was "100 Years of Feminism in the Révolution Prolétarienne of August 1948. She died in 1962.

== Sources ==
- Accampo, Elinor (2010-09-01). Blessed Motherhood, Bitter Fruit: Nelly Roussel and the Politics of Female Pain in Third Republic France. JHU Press. ISBN 978-0-8018-8896-0.
- "Bigot (1878-1962)". La Bataille socialiste. 19 August 2007.
- Chenut, Helen (2010-11-01). Fabric of Gender: Working-Class Culture in Third Republic France. Penn State Press. ISBN 978-0-271-04625-9.
- Dutton, Paul V. (2002-05-16). Origins of the French Welfare State: The Struggle for Social Reform in France, 1914–1947. Cambridge University Press. ISBN 978-1-139-43296-2.
- Fauré, Christine (2004-06-02). Political and Historical Encyclopaedia of Women. Routledge. ISBN 978-1-135-45691-7.
- Fell, Alison S. (2009). Femmes Face À la Guerre. Peter Lang. ISBN 978-3-03911-332-3.
- Gruber, Helmut; Graves, Pamela M. (1998). Women and Socialism, Socialism and Women: Europe Between the Two World Wars. Berghahn Books. ISBN 978-1-57181-152-3.
- "Marthe Bigot". Marxist.org.
- Siegel, Mona L. (2004-12-02). The Moral Disarmament of France: Education, Pacifism, and Patriotism, 1914-1940. Cambridge University Press. ISBN 978-0-521-83900-6.

== External link ==
- Biography on Le Maitron (in French)
