= Charles Rappoport =

Russian and French militant communist politician, journalist and writer

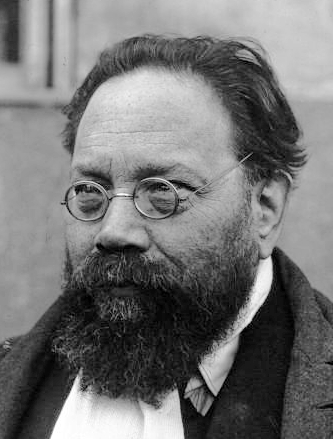
- Rappoport in 1921
- Born: 14 June 1865; Dūkštas, Lithuania
- Died: 17 November 1941 (aged 76); Saint-Cirq-Lapopie, Cahors, France
- Citizenship: Russian Empire (before 1899); France (after 1899)
- Occupations: Politician, journalist, activist, writer
- Political party: RSDLP; SFIO; PCF

Charles Rappoport (14 June 1865 – 17 November 1941) was a Russian and French militant communist politician, journalist and writer. A Jewish intellectual, and a multilingual scholar, he's been referred to as "a grand man of French radicalism".

== Biography ==
Rappoport was born in a Dūkštas shtetl in the Kovno Governorate of the Russian Empire (present-day Lithuania), grew up in a traditional Jewish area. He attended gymnasium in Vilnius, but left the country after encountering the Narodnaya Volya. He attended university in Switzerland, and then moved to France. As a young man, he was a journalist for Hebrew language periodicals. He entered politics in the Russian People's Will Party, later the R.S.D.L.P. He was a member of the Union of Russian Socialist Revolutionaries, along with Chaim Zhitlowsky (founder), M. M. Rozenbaum, and S. Ansky.

He emigrated to France, setting in Paris at the end of the 19th century, and becoming a French citizen in 1899. Rappoport was instrumental in mobilizing Yiddish-speaking Parisian Jews; in 1901, he founded the Groupe des ouvriers israelites, a club and meeting place for Jewish socialists in the Pletzl's Rue Vieille-du-Temple.

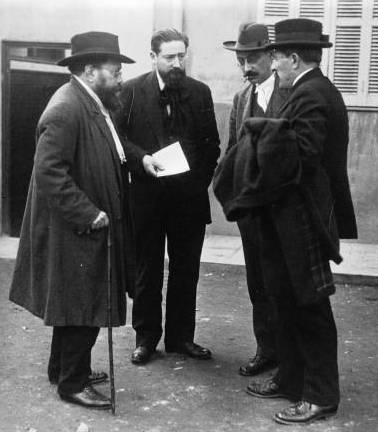
Rappoport at the 1st Congress of the PCF in Marseille in 1921. From the left, Rappoport, Daniel Renoult, Ludovic-Oscar Frossard, and Marcel Cachin.

As a Marxist, Rappoport campaigned in the French Section of the Workers' International (Section Française de l'Internationale Ouvrière, SFIO). In 1914, he denounced the SFIO's acceptance of the First World War. An early Zimmerwaldian. he was neither a reformist nor a modernist in his ideology. With Paul Vaillant-Couturier and Albert Treint, Rappoport was a representative of the Comintern ("Third International"; 1919–1943). At the SFIO's Tours Congress in December 1920, he was part of the majority who founded the French Communist Party (Parti communiste français, PCF), and was elected to the Steering Committee. Although in 1922-1923 he supported the Frossard centre of the group, following the Stalinization of the PCF in the late 1930s, he strongly disagreed with the party line and support for the Soviet Union, and he left the PCF in 1938.

On 18 September 1923, a 32-year-old cleaner and former White Russian officer came to Rappoport's home, intending to assassinate him. However, Rappoport was in Strasbourg at the time, and his daughter Fanny answered the door instead. When the officer learned she was Rappoport's daughter, he shot her at point blank range. He then turned himself in to the police. Reporting at the time indicates Fanny likely survived.

At the time of the Second World War, he retired to Saint-Cirq-Lapopie where he died in 1941. One can read on his tomb at the Montparnasse Cemetery in Paris the following epitaph: Le socialisme sans la liberté n'est pas le socialisme, la liberté sans le socialisme n'est pas la liberté ("Socialism without freedom is not socialism, freedom without socialism is not freedom.")

== Works ==
Rappoport was the author of numerous works such as La Philosophie de l'histoire comme science de l'évolution (1903), Un peu d'histoire : origines, doctrines et méthodes socialistes (1912), and La Révolution sociale, (1912), and Pourquoi nous sommes socialistes? (1919). In La Crise socialiste et sa solution, par Charles Rappoport (1918), Rappoport discusses his intellectual and ideological development. The biography of Jean Jaurès, Jean Jaurès: l'homme, le penseur, le socialiste (1915), written after his assassination, is considered the best biography of Jaurès. Rappoport's memoir, Une vie révolutionnaire : 1883-1940 : les mémoires de Charles Rappoport, was published in 1991.
