= Tours Congress =

18th National Congress of the French Section of the Workers' International

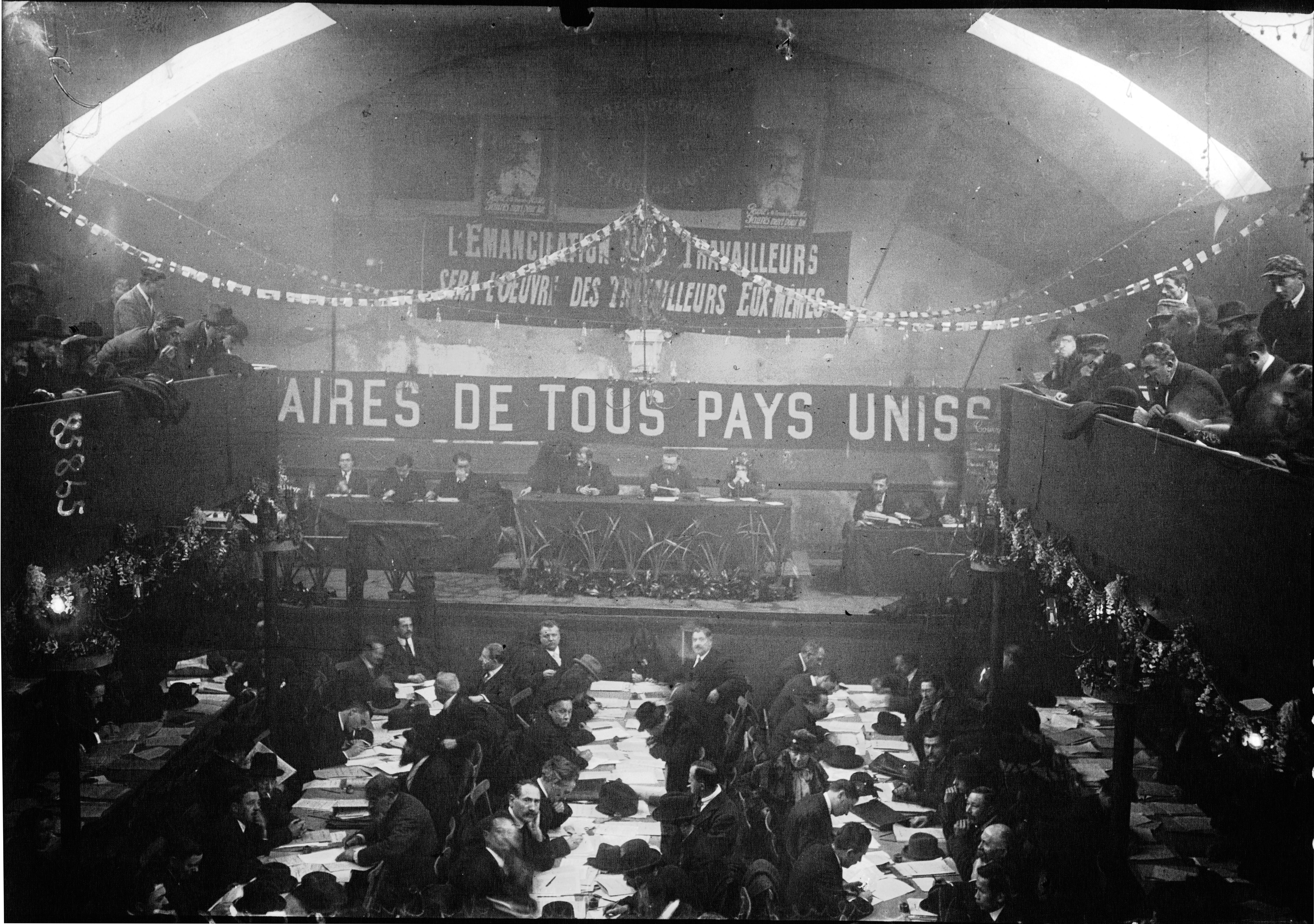
- Native name: Congrès de Tours
- Date: 25–30 December 1920
- Venue: Salle du Manège
- Location: Tours, French Third Republic
- Type: Congress of the SFIO

The Tours Congress was the 18th National Congress of the French Section of the Workers' International (SFIO) which took place in Tours on 25–30 December 1920. During the Congress, the majority voted to join the Third International and create the French Section of the Communist International, which became the French Communist Party in 1921.

The SFIO divided itself in three factions during the Congress:

- The larger one gathered those who had accepted the Third International's 21 Conditions behind Fernand Loriot, Boris Souvarine, Ludovic Frossard, and Marcel Cachin. They did not, however, accept all of Lenin's conditions, and no vote on the matter took place. This left-wing faction, formed by the younger leaders of the party and most of the SFIO's members, obtained three-quarters of the votes and split away to form the French Section of the Communist International (Section Française de l'Internationale Communiste, or SFIC). They took with them the party paper L'Humanité, founded by Jean Jaurès in 1904. L'Humanité remained tied to the party until the 1990s.
- The second faction was led by a minority who accepted the adhesion to the Third International, but only under specific conditions. They finally allied themselves to the third faction.
- The third faction led by Léon Blum and most elected socialists (including Paul Faure and Jean Longuet), who completely refused Lenin's conditions and preferred staying inside of the Second International. Blum, who would become Prime Minister during the 1936–1938 Popular Front, famously declared: "Someone has to stay and keep the old house."

Hence the SFIO split in two: the SFIC (3,208 votes) and the SFIO (1,022 votes). The next year, the CGT trade-union also split, with the creation of the Communist Confédération générale du travail unitaire (CGTU), which itself merged again with the CGT at the 1936 Toulouse Congress during the Popular Front.

A young Ho Chi Minh, then known as Nguyen Ai Quoc, was present at the congress and made a speech decrying the exploitation of the French colonies, and supporting the proposal to join the Third International.
