= Sacred Union =

Political truce in the French Third Republic

The Sacred Union (French: Union Sacrée, French: [ynjɔ̃ sakʁe]) was a political truce in the French Third Republic in which the left-wing agreed during World War I not to oppose the government or call any strikes. Made in the name of patriotism, it stood in opposition to the pledge made by the French Section of the Workers' International (SFIO), internationalism, and its former leader Jean Jaurès not to enter any "bourgeois war". Although an important part of the socialist movement joined the Union sacrée, some trade unionists such as Pierre Monatte opposed it.

On 3 August 1914, Germany declared war on France. The next day, Prime Minister Rene Viviani read an address written by President Raymond Poincaré:

In the coming war, France ... will be heroically defended by all her sons, whose sacred union will not be broken in the face of the enemy (Note: French: Dans la guerre qui s'engage, la France ... sera héroïquement défendue par tous ses fils, dont rien ne brisera devant l'ennemi l'union sacrée)

— Raymond Poincaré

This political movement may have been an attempt to create solidarity during a time when the largely pacifist SFIO threatened a general strike, while many French Catholics were slighted by anticlerical policies, such as the separation of church and state. Elements of nationalism, that the Germans attacked rather than the French, anti-German propaganda, and a desire to regain the former French territory of Alsace–Lorraine may have provided further impetus for the movement.

== Equivalent terms ==
Similar movements existed in other countries, such as the Burgfriedenspolitik in Germany or the União Sagrada in Portugal.
