= History of anarcho-syndicalism =

The history of anarcho-syndicalism dates back to the anti-authoritarian faction of the International Workingmen's Association. Revolutionary syndicalism as a tendency was constituted in the 1890s by the French General Confederation of Labour (CGT), which became a model union for other syndicalist organisations to base themselves on. Anarchists were involved in the syndicalist movement from the outset and a specific anarchist tendency developed within the movement over the subsequent decades.

Anarcho-syndicalism was developed as a specific tendency following the International Anarchist Congress of Amsterdam in 1907, when anarchists within the syndicalist movement began establishing international connections between various unions. Anarcho-syndicalism soon became the founding principles of national trade union centres throughout the world, gaining particular prominence in Europe and Latin America. After breaking with Bolshevism in the wake of the Russian Revolution, anarcho-syndicalists established their own International Workers' Association (IWA) in 1922. Anarcho-syndicalism reached its apex during the Spanish Revolution of 1936, when the National Confederation of Labour (CNT) established an anarcho-syndicalist economy throughout much of the Spanish Republic.

After the defeat of the anarchists in the Spanish Civil War, the suppression of anarcho-syndicalist unions by various authoritarian regimes and the establishment of welfare states throughout much of the Western bloc, anarcho-syndicalism went into a period of decline. The movement split into two factions: the "orthodox" faction, which held to traditional syndicalist principles in spite of changing material conditions and increased political isolation; and the "revisionist" faction, which aimed to achieve a mass base and push for progressive reforms within existing systems to create an industrial democracy. By the end of the 20th century, the rise of neoliberalism and the collapse of the Eastern Bloc had led to a revival in anarcho-syndicalism, with syndicalist unions once again being established throughout the globe.

== Origins ==
The roots of anarcho-syndicalism lie in the anarchist faction of the International Workingmen's Association (IWA), which upheld the central role of trade unions in the class struggle and called for a general strike to replace the state with a free association of producers. This was in opposition to the Marxist faction, which proposed the seizure of state power by a political party. The IWA's largest section was the Spanish Regional Federation (FRE), which adopted the anarchist platform of revolutionary trade unionism and organised itself according to a structure that anticipated syndicalism. The FRE was driven underground following the suppression of the FRE-led Petroleum Revolution in 1873, after which they were succeeded by a series of unions such as the Federation of Workers of the Spanish Region (FTRE) and the Union and Solidarity Pact (PUS). The FRE's model was also taken up by Cuban anarchists, who established their own union federations to organise Cuban workers and recently emancipated slaves.

In the United States, the anarchists of the International Working People's Association (IWPA) also adopted the proto-syndicalist platform of Albert Parsons and established a large trade union federation in Chicago. Despite its suppression after the Haymarket affair, the IWPA was strongly influential on the development of syndicalism (described as "anarchism made practical") and left behind a legacy commemorated in International Workers' Day. Anarchists also participated in the trade union movement in Mexico, where they established the Mexican Workers' General Congress (CGOM) and dedicated it towards using unions as their vehicle for social revolution. While the influence of the anarchists was strong in the Spanish and American labour movements, most of Europe's trade unions fell under the control of social-democratic political parties. During the 1880s, a period of economic growth had encouraged the development of reformist tendencies such as social democracy, resulting in the sidelining of the anarchists, who had largely neglected labour organisation in favour of individual acts of "propaganda of the deed".

But the technological innovations achieved during the Second Industrial Revolution also preceded a simultaneous rise in profits and decline of wages, while new management strategies resulted in the increase of both workload and working time. Increasing levels of the division of labour brought with it a rise in alienation among workers, which led to the development of calls for workers' self-management and workers' control over the means of production. Even as strike actions became more common around the world, social-democratic union leaders remained largely reluctant to engage in strikes and limited the decision-making power of individual members through internal bureaucracy. Despite protests by the membership, these centralised trade unions often preferred to form compromised "wage agreements" with their employers rather than risk opening their accumulated strike fund. The moderate tendencies of the union leadership eventually provoked widespread disillusionment among the rank-and-file union members, with some such as Karl Roche coming to characterise paid union officials as a new upper class.

Increasing tensions between the union leadership and membership led to the development of a current that had by now become known as syndicalism, which called for workers themselves to take direct action to improve their own material conditions. Anarchists also began to move away from insurrectionism and back towards the labour movement, increasingly promoting syndicalism as a "practical form of organisation for the realisation of anarchist-communism" and even beginning to capture some unions from the social-democrats.

== Growth of syndicalism ==
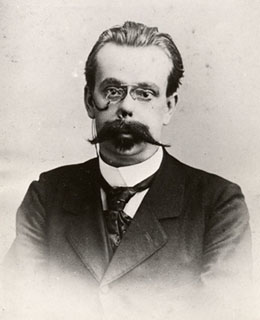
Fernand Pelloutier, a leading figure within the Bourse du Travail movement

The birth of the revolutionary syndicalist movement took place in France, at the end of the 19th century. After the French state's suppression of the Paris Commune and the First International, trade unions were left disorganised and many fell under the control of republican and socialist political parties. At this time, workers began to establish the Bourses du Travail (Labour Exchanges), which provided mutual aid, encouraged the self-organisation of independent trade unions and organised strike actions. These institutions were established outside of political party control by a broad coalition of rank-and-file trade union members, revolutionary socialists and anarchists. Led by Fernand Pelloutier, the anarchists saw the bourses as an embryo for the formation of a stateless society, conceiving of them as a means for workers to negotiate short-term gains while preparing for a revolutionary general strike. By the turn of the 20th century, the bourses had joined with other independent trade unions to form the General Confederation of Labour (CGT), which eventually came to include 60% of French workers across all economic sectors within its ranks. Holding to the principles of revolutionary syndicalism, in 1905, the CGT launched a campaign for workers themselves to institute the eight-hour day. On International Workers' Day of 1906, this campaign culminated in a general strike, which secured a reduction in working time and workload, an increase in wages and the introduction of the weekend. But the years that followed brought increased state repression against the CGT, eventually forcing it to turn towards reformism.

By this time, revolutionary syndicalism had already spread throughout Europe. In the Netherlands, the National Labor Secretariat moved away from social democracy and adopted syndicalism. In Italy, a series of syndicalist-led general strikes brought about the establishment of the Italian Syndicalist Union (USI), which itself led a further series of general strikes that culminated in the Red Week. In Portugal, the repression that followed the 1910 Revolution, during which a syndicalist-led general strike had briefly brought Lisbon under workers' control, forced the socialists and anarchists to join within the National Workers' Union (UON). In Germany, syndicalists established the Free Association of German Trade Unions (FVdG) outside the control of the Social Democratic Party (SDP). In Sweden, the defeat of a general strike accelerated the split of syndicalists from the social-democratic unions, with the formation of the Central Organisation of the Workers of Sweden (SAC). Syndicalism also experienced a growth in Norway and Denmark, after the negotiated end to a series of lockouts by social-democratic union leadership pushed radicals to establish their own syndicalist unions: the Norwegian Syndicalist Federation (NSF) and Trade Union Opposition Federation (FS).

In contrast to the spread of French-style syndicalism throughout Europe, the English-speaking world saw the development of a tendency known as industrial unionism, which upheld the concept of "One Big Union". This movement was led by the Industrial Workers of the World (IWW), which spread from the United States to Australia, the United Kingdom and South Africa. The only development of syndicalism in Anglophone countries was in Britain, where in 1910, the Industrial Syndicalist Education League (ISEL) was founded by Tom Mann and began to organise workers in the mining and transportation industries. The ISEL organised the 1911 Liverpool general transport strike, which managed to receive significant international support, and convinced the South Wales Miners' Federation to reorganise along syndicalist lines, before going on to participate in the 1912 United Kingdom national coal strike. By the 1910s, syndicalism had spread throughout every country in Europe and anarchist tendencies started to develop within the movement.

== Development of anarchist syndicalism ==
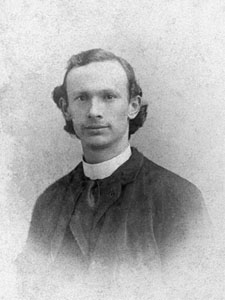
Christiaan Cornelissen, an early leader of the anarcho-syndicalist movement following the International Anarchist Congress of Amsterdam

Despite their shared commitment to trade union action, revolutionary syndicalists lacked a coherent ideology. The Dutch syndicalist Christiaan Cornelissen found that the movement was divided into three main groups: socialists, who saw syndicalism as a means to break away from parliamentary politics; trade unionists, who saw it as a distinct ideology of class conflict; and anarchists. In 1906, the CGT attempted to find a compromise between these different syndicalist tendencies by creating a unified declaration of syndicalist principles: the Charter of Amiens. The Charter declared that the CGT was to be a class-based organisation, not an ideological one, and would welcome workers of all political tendencies so long as they agreed with the abolition of wage labour and capitalism. It stated that the "dual purpose" of syndicalism was to work towards immediate improvements of working conditions, and to prepare for a general strike in which trade unions would take over production and distribution. Ideological convictions outside of these aims were requested to be left outside the union.

Although sympathetic to the revolutionary syndicalist program, many within the anarchist movement remained skeptical towards the syndicalist movement. When the International Anarchist Congress of Amsterdam was convened by the anarcho-syndicalist Christiaan Cornelissen in 1907, a conflict between the two tendencies broke out. While the CGT's Pierre Monatte attempted to highlight the shared similarities between anarchism and syndicalism, he insisted that the latter was "self-sufficient". Monatte's claims were the target of vocal criticism from Errico Malatesta, who, although not denying trade unionism as a means of revolutionary struggle for workers' self-management, considered trade unions to exist primarily as way to protect workers' interests within the existing system. He also rejected the possibility that a general strike could replace insurrection as the principle means for a social revolution, although he believed it could serve as the igniting incident for one. He ended by calling on anarchists to transform trade unions into anarchist organisations; Amédée Dunois followed up by laying the groundwork for an anarchist syndicalism, calling for the replacement of abstract "pure anarchism" with a concrete "workers' anarchism." When the Congress created a bureau for an Anarchist International, it included syndicalists such as the Russian Alexander Schapiro, the English John Turner and the German Rudolf Rocker. However, the bureau was short-lived and had already dissolved by 1911.

In spite of the tensions between syndicalism and anarchism in Western Europe, the anarchist workers' movements in Spain and Latin America continued to be influenced by revolutionary syndicalism. In 1907, Spanish workers' organisations that had succeeded the FRE and FTRE once again came together into the federation Workers' Solidarity (SO), which aimed to replace capitalism with a socialist workers' economy. It soon grew highly influential in the industrial region of Catalonia, where in 1909, it organised a general strike against the Spanish invasion of Morocco, although it would be violently suppressed during the "Tragic Week". In 1910, workers' organisations throughout Spain united into the National Confederation of Labour (CNT), which was based on the syndicalist model of the French CGT. It adopted syndicalist aims for the eight-hour day, minimum wage and a revolutionary general strike, upheld the anarchist principle of rejecting political parties, and affirmed that syndicalism was a means by which workers could liberate themselves. Driven forward by this characteristically anarchist form of syndicalism, within a year, the CNT grew to count 30,000 members and organised large strikes in major cities throughout Spain. The organisation was banned in 1911, but continued its activities underground, organising several general strikes throughout the country until its public reemergence in 1914.

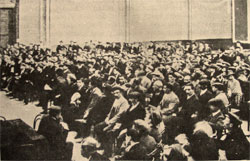
Founding congress of the Confederación Nacional del Trabajo (CNT)

By this time, anarchist workers' movements had also risen to prominence throughout Latin America. In 1901, the Argentine Regional Workers' Federation (FORA) was established, and by 1905, it had adopted anarchist communism as its political philosophy, rejecting the political neutrality (or "self-sufficiency") of syndicalist trade unions. The FORA organised a series of general strikes in Rosario and Buenos Aires, often resulting in harsh police repression, but also winning material improvements in working conditions. Spanish anarchists reported that, during that period in Argentina, "almost all the workers are anarchists". Nevertheless, by 1916, the issue of "neutral syndicalism" would end up splitting the FORA into anarchist and moderate factions. The FORA would also provide the model for the establishment of other organisations, including: the Uruguayan Regional Workers' Federation (FORU), which organised a series of general strikes in various sectors of the Uruguayan economy, resulting in the achievement of the eight-hour day; and the Paraguayan Regional Workers' Federation (FORP). During the Mexican Revolution, anarchists collaborated in the overthrow of the Porfiriato and established the syndicalist union House of the World Worker (COM). The COM formed an alliance with the Constitutionalists against the revolutionary forces of Pancho Villa and Emiliano Zapata, but by 1916, were themselves repressed by the constitutional government. Anarchist trade unionists also achieved significant levels of influence in Cuba and Brazil, where in the latter they established the Brazilian Workers' Confederation (COB). In Chile, anarchist Resistance Societies and "Mancomunales" organised a series of strikes, but were violently repressed by the government. In Peru, anarchist trade unions organised a number of general strikes which achieved the eight-hour day. Anarchist trade unions were also established in Bolivia, Ecuador and Panama, among other countries.

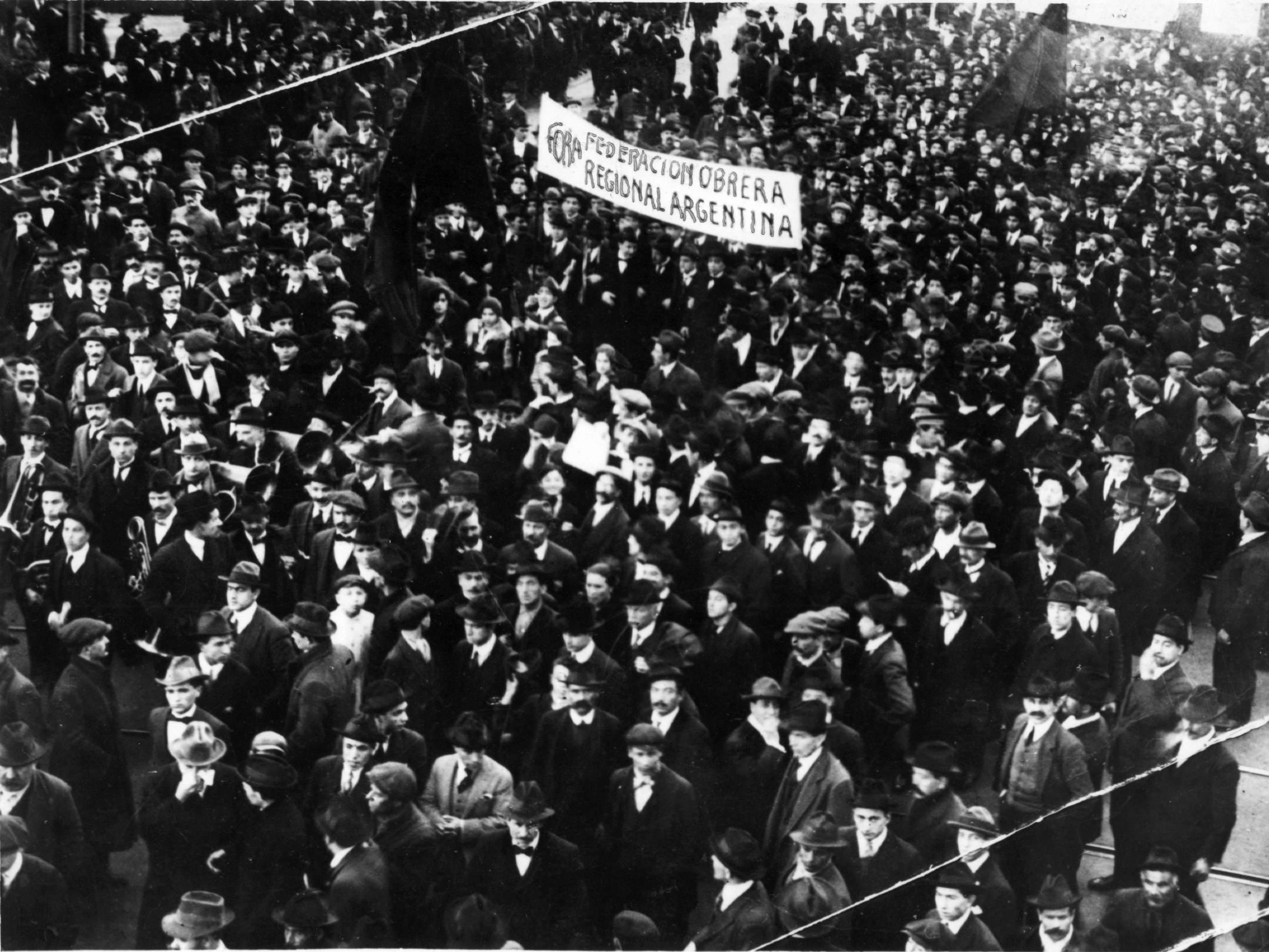
Demonstration by the Argentine Regional Workers' Federation (FORA) in 1915

As the anarchist and syndicalist movements gained ground throughout the world, syndicalists that had participated in the 1907 Amsterdam Congress (led by Christiaan Cornelissen) established an International Syndicalist Bulletin, through which they aimed to form links between syndicalist organisations and further develop the movement. Revolutionary syndicalists in Western Europe called for the CGT to convoke an international trade union congress, which would also allow the participation of reformist unions, to promote working-class unity. The International Secretariat of National Trade Union Centres (ISNTUC) was established under the leadership of the German social democrats, who blocked resolutions for general strikes and anti-militarism from congress agendas. The CGT initially boycotted the conferences, but eventually decided to participate, despite its inability to further its goals within the organisation. Setting themselves apart from the ISNTUC, the British ISEL decided to take the initiative for holding an international syndicalist congress, which would invite any syndicalists that supported revolutionary class struggle and rejected political parties. In September 1913, the congress was convened at Holborn Town Hall in London, bringing together delegates of syndicalist organisations from Argentina, Belgium, Brazil, Britain, Cuba, France, Germany, Italy, the Netherlands, Spain and Sweden. With Christiaan Cornelissen as its secretary and Alexander Schapiro providing translation, the congress discussed a series of issues. Differences emerged between the supporters of revolutionary syndicalism, and those like Alceste De Ambris, who attempted to downplay anti-capitalist and anti-statist resolutions. The Congress ended up adopting a revolutionary syndicalist declaration of class struggle and direct action against capitalism and the state; it called for the formation of independent trade unions that could organise both for immediate improvements to working conditions and for the eventual overthrow of capitalism and the state, after which the unions would take over production and distribution. The Congress closed by establishing an International Syndicalist Information Bureau, which would coordinate the international syndicalist movement and organise future conferences. Despite protests from De Ambris, the Bureau came under the effective control of the Dutch NAS, with Gerrit van Erkel as its chair, and began its work on 1 January 1914. But the international unification of anarchists and syndicalists was brought to a halt that same year, with the outbreak of World War I.

== World War I ==
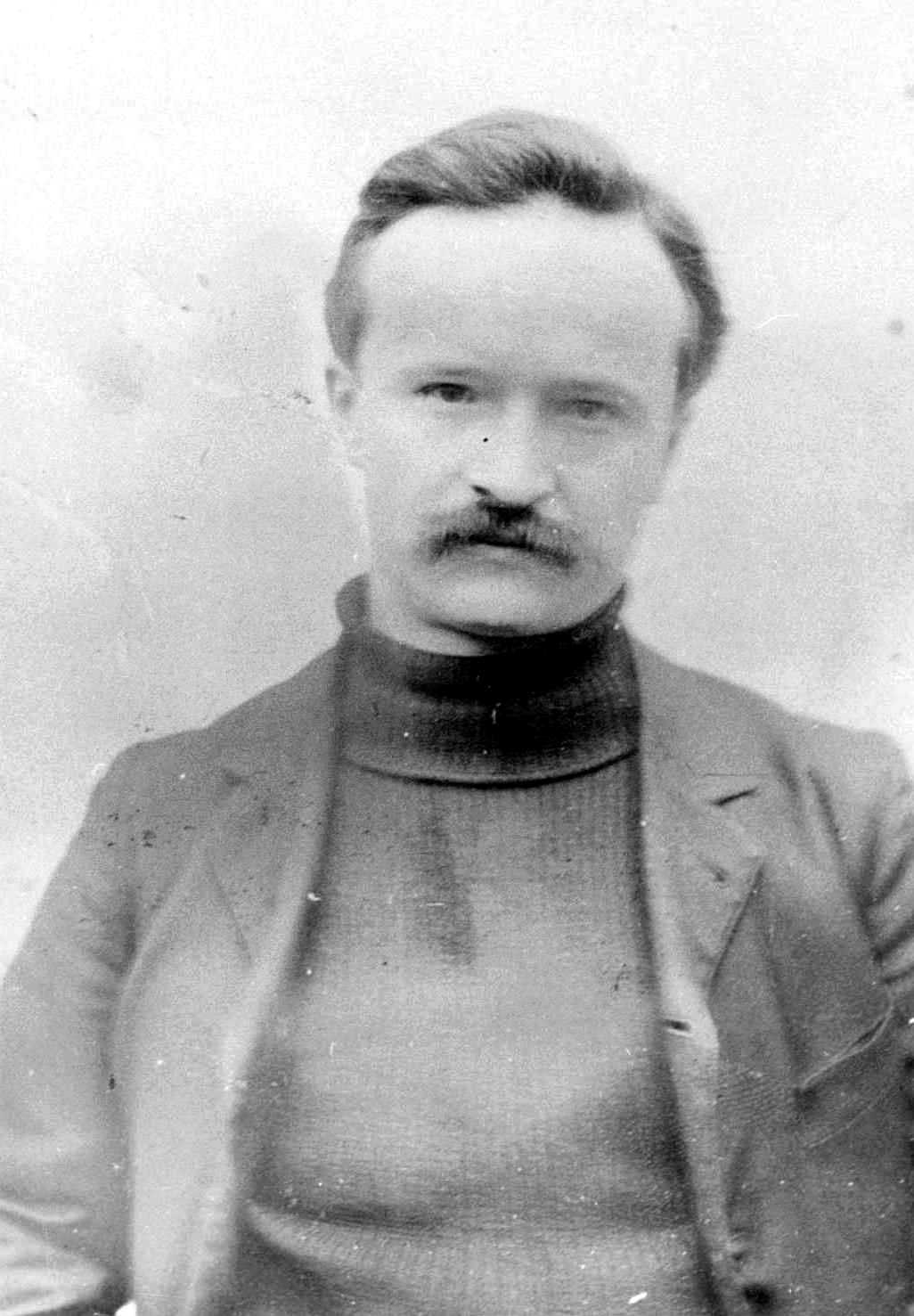
Pierre Monatte, a leading proponent of anti-militarism within the French CGT during World War I

The World War split anarcho-syndicalists into internationalists and defencists: the former, including Alexander Berkman, Alexander Schapiro and Bill Shatov, declared themselves against both sides of the war and upheld anti-militarism; the latter, including Christiaan Cornelissen, supported the Entente against the "greater evil" of the Central Powers. The French CGT, which had already begun to diverge from revolutionary syndicalism after winning a series of improvements in working conditions, called for national defense against the German invasion of France and collaborated with the French state in its war effort. By 1915, an anti-war opposition within the CGT, concentrated around La Vie Ouvrière and led by Alphonse Merrheim and Pierre Monatte, had established the Syndicalist Defense Committee (CDS) and began to support strike actions against the worsening working conditions brought by the war. In Italy, syndicalists of the USI were also split by the war, with De Ambris supporting the war on grounds that it would create a revolutionary situation in the country. But the majority of the USI, led by Armando Borghi, supported a general strike against the war effort and expelled De Ambris' faction from the trade unions. In the United States, the IWW agitated against the American entry into World War I, resulting in harsh repression against the union, during which the activist Joe Hill was executed and other members were shot or deported. Nevertheless, the IWW managed to organise a series of strikes against the military industry and its membership grew from 40,000 in 1916 to over 125,000 in 1917. In Germany and Britain, the syndicalist movement found itself disabled by the war.

Working conditions deteriorated as the war continued, with strikes and rioting becoming more commonplace as the years went on. In France, a revolutionary syndicalist congress called for a general strike against the war and protests in the metal industry damaged the war economy, but the anti-war movement was suppressed, with Raymond Péricat being convicted of treason. In Spain, deteriorating living conditions provoked the formation of an alliance by the CNT and UGT, who together, in August 1917, carried out a revolutionary general strike, although this was also suppressed. In Portugal, the rising cost of living resulted in a series of riots and strike actions by revolutionary syndicalists, who came to take over the UON. In 1915, Spanish and Portuguese anarchists held an anti-militarist congress in Galicia, where they received delegates from Argentina, Brazil, Britain, Cuba, France and Italy, which called for an international general strike. The Dutch NAS also called for an international revolutionary syndicalist congress to be held in the neutral Netherlands, but this didn't come to fruition until the war was over. The conflict ended up demonstrating the inability of the international syndicalist movement to prevent war and discredited "neutral syndicalism" in the eyes of many workers, causing revolutionary sentiments to once again begin rising within the workers' movement.

== Revolutions of 1917–1923 ==
=== Russia and Ukraine ===
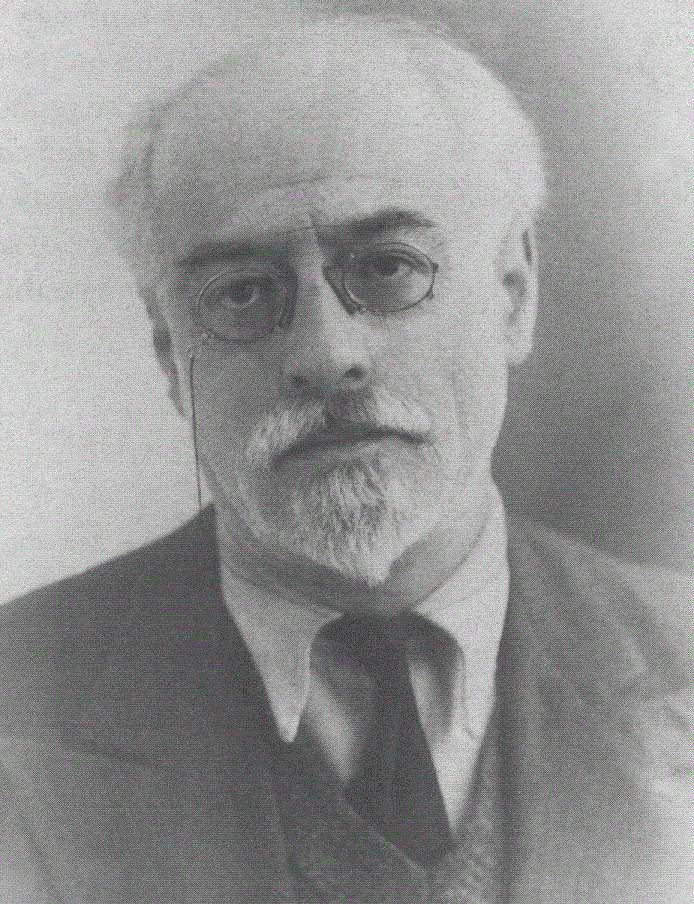
Volin, a leading Russian anarcho-syndicalist during the Russian Revolution and Civil War

When the Revolutions of 1917–1923 spread throughout Europe, anarchists and syndicalists became keen participants in the revolutionary wave. During the Russian Revolution, anarcho-syndicalists grouped around the newspaper Golos Truda held two national conferences in 1918. Attempts to establish national anarcho-syndicalist organisations culminated with the creation of the Russian Confederation of Anarcho-Syndicalists (RKAS) and the Confederation of Ukrainian Anarchist Organisations (Nabat). Anarcho-syndicalists were successful in organising workers in several industries throughout the former Russian Empire, from Ukraine to Siberia, but these syndicalist unions were eventually dissolved by either the Bolsheviks or the White movement. At the First All Russian Congress of Trade Unions, anarcho-syndicalist delegates were elected by 88,000 workers, but this number declined to 53,000 at the Second Congress and to 35,000 at the Third Congress. Anarcho-syndicalist attempts to establish a national trade union centre were suppressed, while their unions and publications were shut down by the Bolsheviks. Leading anarcho-syndicalists like Volin, Aron Baron and Mark Mratchny were imprisoned in Taganka Prison for their participation in the Makhnovist movement. Along with Grigorii Maksimov, they launched a hunger strike to draw attention to foreign syndicalist delegates visiting the Profintern's first congress, resulting in their deportation in January 1922.

=== Germany ===
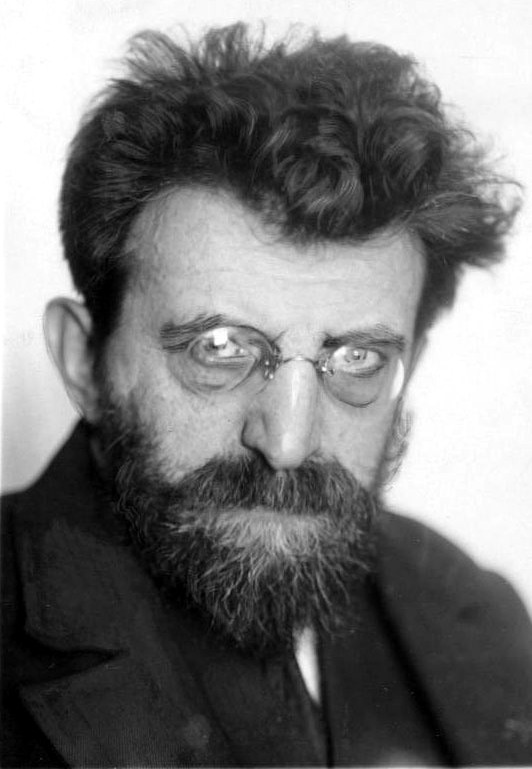
Erich Mühsam, an anarchist participant in the Bavarian Soviet Republic

Following the German Revolution, the FVdG resumed its activities within the rising council movement, advocating for workers' councils to take over production and distribution. The syndicalists gained particular influence in the councils of the Bavarian Soviet Republic, which included the anarchists Gustav Landauer and Erich Mühsam among its leadership. But by 1920, the council movement had declined and was integrated into the new Weimar Republic. After leading a general strike in the Ruhr, the syndicalists began to gain more influence in the region, with the FVdG reorganising itself into the Free Workers' Union of Germany (FAUD), which counted 112,000 members at the time of its founding congress. In March 1920, the FAUD played a leading role in the Ruhr uprising against the Kapp Putsch, organising workers' councils throughout the region, taking control of the Thyssen steel factories and fielding 45% of the members of the "Red Army of the Ruhr". The uprising was suppressed, but the FAUD's influence continued to grow and they persisted in open revolts against the Republican government. Although increasing repression against the FAUD led to a decline in their strength, they continued organising workers and attempted to resist the Occupation of the Ruhr, but the country's economic collapse damaged its ability to organise workers and its membership fell to 30,000.

=== Italy ===
During the Biennio Rosso in Italy, the USI organised a series of general strikes and factory occupations, intending to establish a decentralised system of workers' councils that could replace the state in the administration of society. By early 1920, workers' uprisings had spread throughout the country, resulting in the seizure of hundreds of enterprises by workers' councils. But the majority union, the General Confederation of Labour (CGL), was content with the concessions it had won and brought the movement to an end, leaving the smaller USI unable to continue its activities by itself. The syndicalists became a target for the rising fascist movement, who attacked the USI's "houses of labour" and suppressing their trade union activities. The anarcho-syndicalists attempted to organise resistance to the fascists, establishing armed anti-fascist detachments and carrying out strike actions, including an attempted anti-fascist general strike. But with the support of the right-wing and the inaction of the left-wing, the fascists rose to power and suppressed the anarcho-syndicalist movement.

=== Iberia ===
The Spanish anarcho-syndicalist movement also experienced a rapid period of growth, integrated numerous industrial unions throughout the country and growing to count more than 1 million members. In February 1919, the CNT organised a successful general strike in solidarity with the La Canadenca strike, managing to win its demands in spite of the state's declaration of martial law. It carried out a series of general strikes over the subsequent years, all the while collecting economic data that would aid it in taking over the economy after a social revolution. In December of that year, the Madrid Congress of the CNT announced its goal to overthrow the State and establish libertarian communism. Spanish employers attempted to neutralise the movement by establishing alternative unions to the CNT and dispatching paramilitaries to attack striking workers, killing the CNT's general secretary Salvador Seguí. The conflict reached its apex with the 1923 Spanish coup d'état, when the dictatorship of Primo de Rivera was established and trade unions were banned.

In Portugal, the syndicalists of the UON organised a series of successful general strikes that managed to win the eight-hour day in some economic sectors. In 1919, the UON was reorganised into the General Confederation of Labour (CGT). The CGT organised trade unions as well as tenants' unions and consumer's cooperatives, coming to count 150,000 members in its ranks. Despite organising many mass demonstrations and successful strikes, these were largely spontaneous and the CGT was unable to channel them into a sustained movement.

=== Other European countries ===
Meanwhile, in France, syndicalists that opposed the reformist leadership of the French CGT established the Revolutionary Syndicalist Committees (CRS), attempting to emulate the Bourses de Travail. The CRS successfully unionised rail workers and led a series bothof rail strikes, which on 1 May 1920 escalated into a general strike, organised across various difference economic sectors. Led by Pierre Monatte, the CRS drove the split of revolutionary syndicalists from the CGT and the establishment of the Confédération générale du travail unitaire (CGTU) in July 1922. In Sweden, the SAC grew to count 32,000 members from various different sectors in its ranks and organised a number of strikes, in connection with syndicalists in Norway and Denmark. The Dutch NAS itself had been strengthened by its position in the anti-war movement, growing to include 49,000 members and organising a number of strikes and protests, but a series of failed strike actions and internal disputes resulted in its membership shrinking to 26,000 members by 1922. Although anarcho-syndicalists had a presence in Belgium, Britain, Bulgaria and Czechoslovakia, they were relatively weak and ultimately unable to establish trade union centres in these countries.

=== Latin America ===
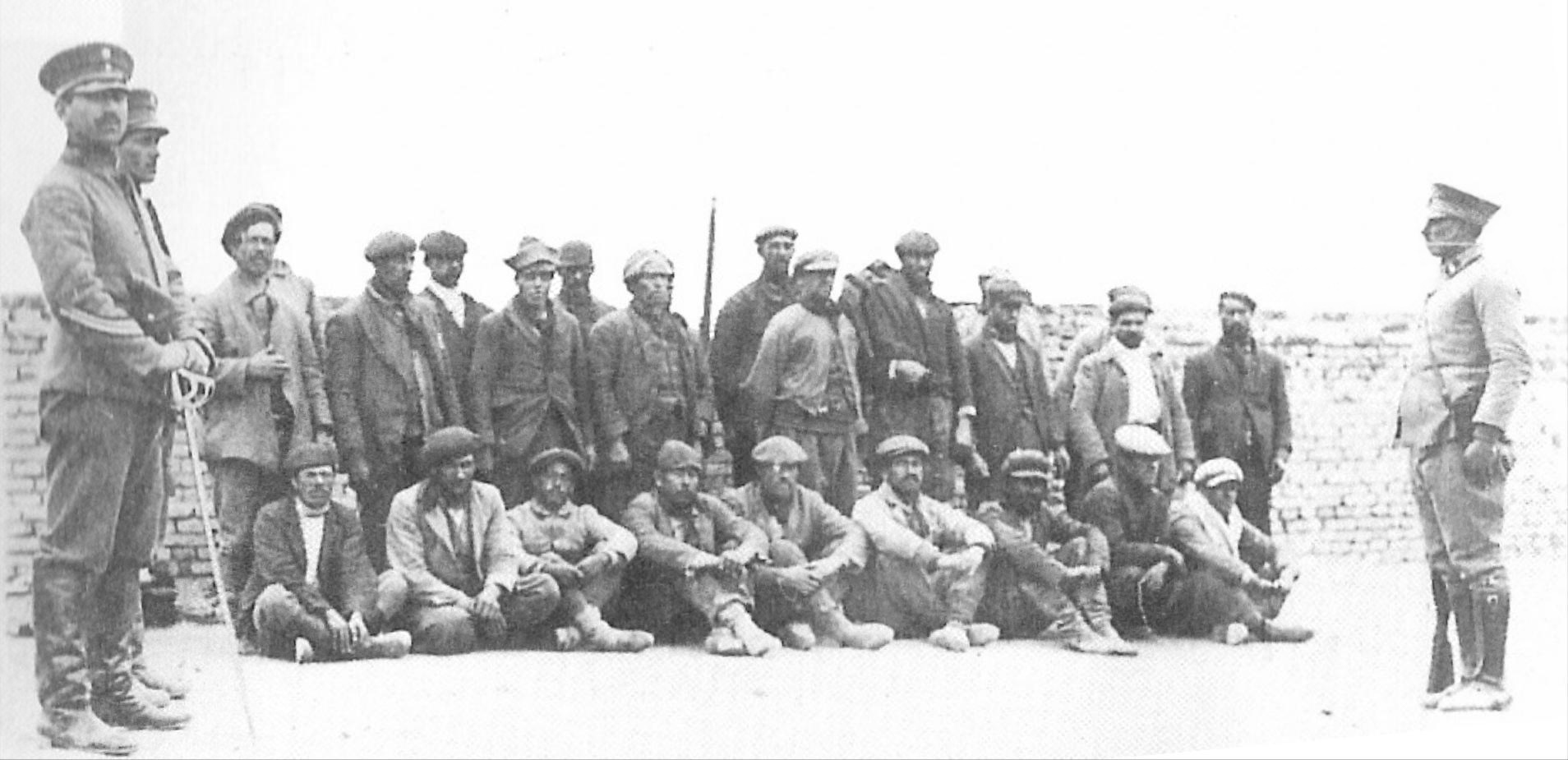
Arrested workers, following the suppression of the Patagonia rebellion

The revolutionary wave saw a particularly strong anarcho-syndicalist participation in events in Latin America. The FORA led a number of general strikes that were violently suppressed by the government, including the "Tragic Week" of January 1919 and the Patagonia rebellion of 1921; the FORU also led a number of strikes in Uruguay during this period. In Brazil, anarcho-syndicalists led a massive general strike movement, including a revolutionary general strike in São Paulo in 1917 and an anarchist insurrection in Rio de Janeiro in 1918, but these were also suppressed. The Brazilian anarcho-syndicalist movement was eventually crushed during the military revolt of 1924. In Mexico, anarcho-syndicalists that were critical of the government-aligned Regional Confederation of Mexican Workers (CROM) established the General Confederation of Workers (CGT) in 1921. The CGT led a series of strikes in various different sectors, coming to count 60,000 members within its ranks. In Chile, anarcho-syndicalists established a local section of the IWW, which came to count 25,000 members across different sectors and took part in a series of strike actions, but was eventually suppressed by the dictatorship of Carlos Ibáñez del Campo.

Anarcho-syndicalist unions also played a leading role in strike actions in Paraguay and Bolivia. In Peru, the Peruvian Regional Workers' Federation (FORP) led a general strike that resulted in the reduction of the work day, but was eventually suppressed by the military dictatorship and supplanted by reformist and communist-aligned unions. In Ecuador, anarcho-syndicalists led the 1922 Guayaquil general strike, which briefly brought the city under workers' control before it was suppressed, stunting the growth of the nascent anarcho-syndicalist movement. In Cuba, attempts by anarcho-syndicalists to establish national trade union centres were suppressed by the dictatorship of Gerardo Machado, allowing the communists to establish control over the workers' movement. Anarcho-syndicalists also established influential trade union centres in Costa Rica, Panama, El Salvador and Guatemala, but these were likewise suppressed.

=== Asia ===
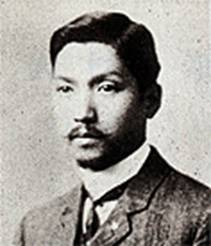
Ōsugi Sakae, a Japanese anarcho-syndicalist leader

During this period, anarcho-syndicalists gained an influence in Asia. In Japan, the post-war workers' movement became radicalised, participating in the rice riots of 1918 and a subsequent series of strike actions. Anarcho-syndicalists gained influence within the Yūaikai, which adopted the principles of class struggle and direct action. In 1921, it was reorganised into the General Federation of Labour, but this was soon taken over by reformists and communists, forcing the anarcho-syndicalists out of the organisation. Anarcho-syndicalist unions attempted to resist the repressions that followed the 1923 Great Kantō earthquake, but the anarcho-syndicalist leader Ōsugi Sakae was murdered during the fallout. In 1926, the national trade union centre Zenkoku Jiren was established along anarchist communist lines, but it was dissolved during the 1930s, with the rise of Shōwa Statism.

In China, anarcho-syndicalists in Guangzhou organised the country's first trade unions and led the first strike actions. Throughout the 1920s, anarchist workers' societies were established in Guangzhou, Hunan and Shanghai, culminating in the establishment of the Federation of Labour Unions in 1924, although this was brought under the control of the Kuomintang during the Northern Expedition. Anarcho-syndicalists also established the Federation of People's Struggle, but this was dissolved due to the conditions of the Chinese Civil War. Anarcho-syndicalism was propagated in India by M. P. T. Acharya, whose group attempted to organise trade unions until its suppression by the British colonisers. Anarcho-syndicalists also worked to establish unions in Taiwan and Korea, but they too were suppressed by the Japanese imperialists. Chinese anarcho-syndicalists also established unions in a number of countries in Southeast Asia, particularly in Malaya.

=== Anglosphere ===
The activity of the IWW also received a boost during the post-war period, during which it attempted to realise its goal of creating One Big Union across industries. But this effort was led by Marxists, not anarcho-syndicalists, and faced heightened repression during the First Red Scare. The IWW carried its work into Canada, Australia and New Zealand, but there too they faced post-war repression and merged into local communist parties. In South Africa, the IWW and its successor the International Socialist League (ISL) organised a series of strikes across racial lines, but also eventually folded into the South African Communist Party.

== International Workers' Association ==
In 1922, the International Workers' Association (IWA) was founded in Berlin, and the CNT joined immediately, but with the rise of Miguel Primo de Rivera's dictatorship, the labour union was outlawed again the following year. The successful Bolshevik-led revolution of 1917 in Russia was mirrored by a wave of syndicalist successes worldwide, including the struggle of the Industrial Workers of the World (IWW) in the United States alongside the creation of mass anarchist unions across Latin America and massive syndicalist-led strikes in Germany, Portugal, Spain, Italy and France, where it was noted that "neutral (economic, but not political) syndicalism had been swept away". The final formation of this new international, then known as the International Workingmen's Association, took place at an illegal conference in Berlin in December 1922, marking an irrevocable break between the international syndicalist movement and the Bolsheviks.

The IWW, a syndicalist union in the United States, considered joining but eventually ruled out affiliation in 1934 based on the IWA's religious and political affiliation policies. Although not anarcho-syndicalist, the IWW was informed by developments in the broader revolutionary syndicalist milieu at the turn of the 20th century. At its founding congress in 1905, influential members with strong anarchist or anarcho-syndicalist sympathies like Thomas J. Hagerty, William Trautmann and Lucy Parsons contributed to the union's overall revolutionary syndicalist orientation. Although the terms anarcho-syndicalism and revolutionary syndicalism are often used interchangeably, the anarcho-syndicalist label was not widely used until the early 1920s: "The term 'anarcho-syndicalist' only came into wide use in 1921–1922 when it was applied polemically as a pejorative term by communists to any syndicalists...who opposed increased control of syndicalism by the communist parties".

Many of the most prominent members of the IWA were broken, driven underground or wiped out in the 1920s–1930s as fascists came to power in states across Europe, and workers switched away from anarchism towards the seeming success of the Bolshevik model of socialism. In Argentina, the FORA had already begun to decline by the time it joined the IWA, having split in 1915 into pro and anti-Bolshevik factions. From 1922, the anarchist movement there lost most of its membership, exacerbated by further splits, most notably around the Severino Di Giovanni affair. It was crushed by General Uriburu's military coup in 1930. Italian IWA union USI had been driven underground by 1924, and although it could still lead significant strikes by miners, metalworkers and marble workers, Mussolini's ascent to power in 1925 sealed its fate. By 1927, its leading activists had been arrested or exiled.

In 1927, with the "moderate" positioning of some cenetistas (CNT members), the Federación Anarquista Ibérica (FAI), an association of anarchist affinity groups, was created in Valencia. The FAI would play an essential role during the following years through the so-called trabazón (connection) with the CNT; that is, the presence of FAI elements in the CNT, encouraging the labour union not to move away from its anarchist principles, an influence that continues today.

== Spanish Revolution ==
Flag of the CNT-FAI

Anarcho-syndicalism was the major tendency among the prominent Spanish anarchist movement leading into the Spanish Revolution of 1936. The anarcho-syndicalist trade union, the Confederación Nacional del Trabajo (CNT) had around 500,000 members in the mid-1930s, with more radical affinity groups within, such as the Federación Anarquista Ibérica (FAI). Radical leadership, including armed uprisings, in the early 1930s led the syndicalists to splinter off as the Trientistas. When civil war broke out in July 1936, the Republicans, which included the CNT, controlled most major cities. The CNT helped organize resistance committees and militias in localities where the Republican state and military infrastructure had withered. Workers' control led to embryonic social changes in which people in poorer areas expropriated property and reclaimed urban spaces abandoned during the war as hospitals, schools, and local businesses. At the CNT's encouragement, the Catalonia region, with Barcelona in particular, saw widespread agrarian and urban collectivization with workers running the economy for the benefit of the larger society, including factory councils. Nearby regions also collectivized, adopted especially by poorer people who stood to gain the most. With these gains, the anarcho-syndicalists did not develop a further program for the revolution and the CNT began cooperating with a central government. By 1937, the Republicans began to feel supplies shortages and dissolve committees. Infighting led to repression of the left that would continue through the remainder of the war.

== World War II ==
By the outbreak of World War II, the FORA and FORU had already broken off relations with the IWA. They rejected syndicalist control of militias, collaboration with the state and proportional representation at IWA congresses, all of which the CNT had upheld during the Spanish Civil War. As they considered both sides to be fighting in the interest of capitalists, the FORA and FORU held an anti-militarist position during the world war, taking up the slogan "Neither Fascism, nor Antifascism." At the outset of the war, European anarcho-syndicalists initially adopted a similar "internationalist" position, arguing for the war to be transformed into a social revolution against both sides. But this position was quickly abandoned after Germany occupied much of Europe and anarcho-syndicalist organisations were banned by the Nazis, forcing the IWA secretariat to flee to neutral Sweden. They soon reoriented themselves towards anti-fascism, with German anarcho-syndicalists in exile in Sweden collaborating directly with the Allies.

Anarcho-syndicalists in Belgium, Bulgaria, France, Hungary, Italy, the Netherlands, Poland and Ukraine all joined the anti-fascist resistance, which they came to regard as a form of anarchist counter-power. Anarcho-syndicalists in the Polish resistance movement played an active role in the Warsaw Uprising, in which they fought in their own partisan detachments. Spanish anarcho-syndicalists were themselves split between the orthodox anti-collaboration faction, which attempted to avoid participating in the conflict, and the anti-fascist faction, which joined the French Resistance and organised partisan activity in Spain. Some anarcho-syndicalists continued to push for anti-militarism throughout the war. In Marseilles, the French anarcho-syndicalist Jean-René Saulière and the Russian Volin attempted to appeal for social revolution against both sides, while in Britain, anarchists organised strikes against the war effort.

== Post-war decline ==
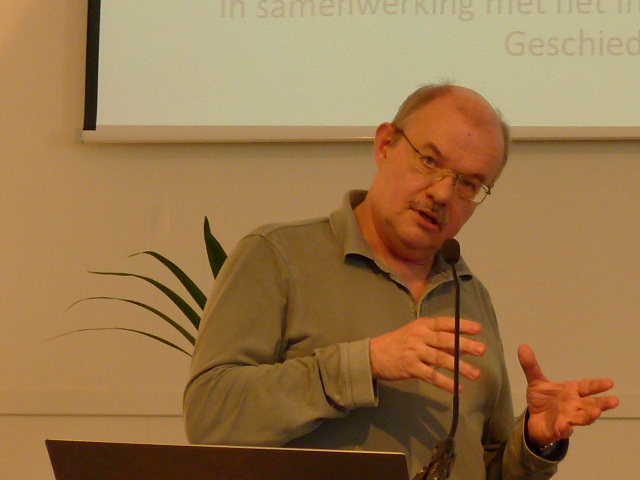
Dutch historian Marcel van der Linden, who provided a materialist explanation for the decline of anarcho-syndicalism in the late-20th century

Anarcho-syndicalism experienced a decline in the wake of World War II, as social corporatism took root in the Western Bloc and political repression increased in the Eastern Bloc, with the anarcho-syndicalist organisations in Bulgaria, East Germany, Poland and Hungary all being broken up. Anarcho-syndicalists faced fierce repression in Francoist Spain, with the CNT attempting to continue its anarcho-syndicalist activities underground. In 1946, the organisation experienced a split over whether or not to support a united front with other anti-fascist forces, in a schism that persisted until the CNT's reunification in 1960. Most of the CNT's work took place in exile in France, where they maintained at least 30,000 active members. The Portuguese CGT was likewise repressed by the Estado Novo, with its underground activity ceasing by the 1960s. Political repression also hit anarcho-syndicalists in Latin America. The Argentine FORA attempted to resist the government of Juan Perón through strikes and demonstrations, but by the 1950s, their independent trade unions and publications had been shut down and its membership declined. Anarcho-syndicalist federations in Uruguay, Chile and Bolivia also dissolved in the early 1950s, with many of them merging into mainstream trade union federations. Anarcho-syndicalists would continue to play leading roles within Latin American trade unions until the 1960s.

Although anarcho-syndicalists had space to pursue legal activity in Western Europe, no substantial revival of the movement took place. In France, the Confederation nationale du travail (CNT) managed to bring together tens of thousands of workers in major cities, but it lacked material and organisational strength, so its members soon left for more mainstream trade unions. The Italian USI was likewise reorganised, but failed to become a major force. In Sweden, the SAC managed to retain a relatively large membership, but also experienced a decline in numbers during the 1950s. Anarchists in France and Italy came to consider anarcho-syndicalism to be a divisive force in the workers movement, and instead began to favour small-scale activities within existing trade unions. According to historians Marcel van der Linden and Wayne Thorpe, changes within the western capitalist system, such as the exacerbation of the division of labour through an increasing rationalisation and automation of production, contributed to this decline in the anarcho-syndicalist movement and the wider radical workers' movement. Keynesian economics also drove an increase in state intervention in the economy, leading to the rise of welfare states, which improved the living conditions of workers and gave them a stake in the functioning of their economic systems. To van der Linden and Thorpe, these new material realities confronted the anarcho-syndicalist movement with three possibilities: to hold firm to its principles, at risk of marginalisation; to revise some of its principles, in order to adjust to the new material conditions; or to dissolve entirely and merge into the reformist trade union movement.

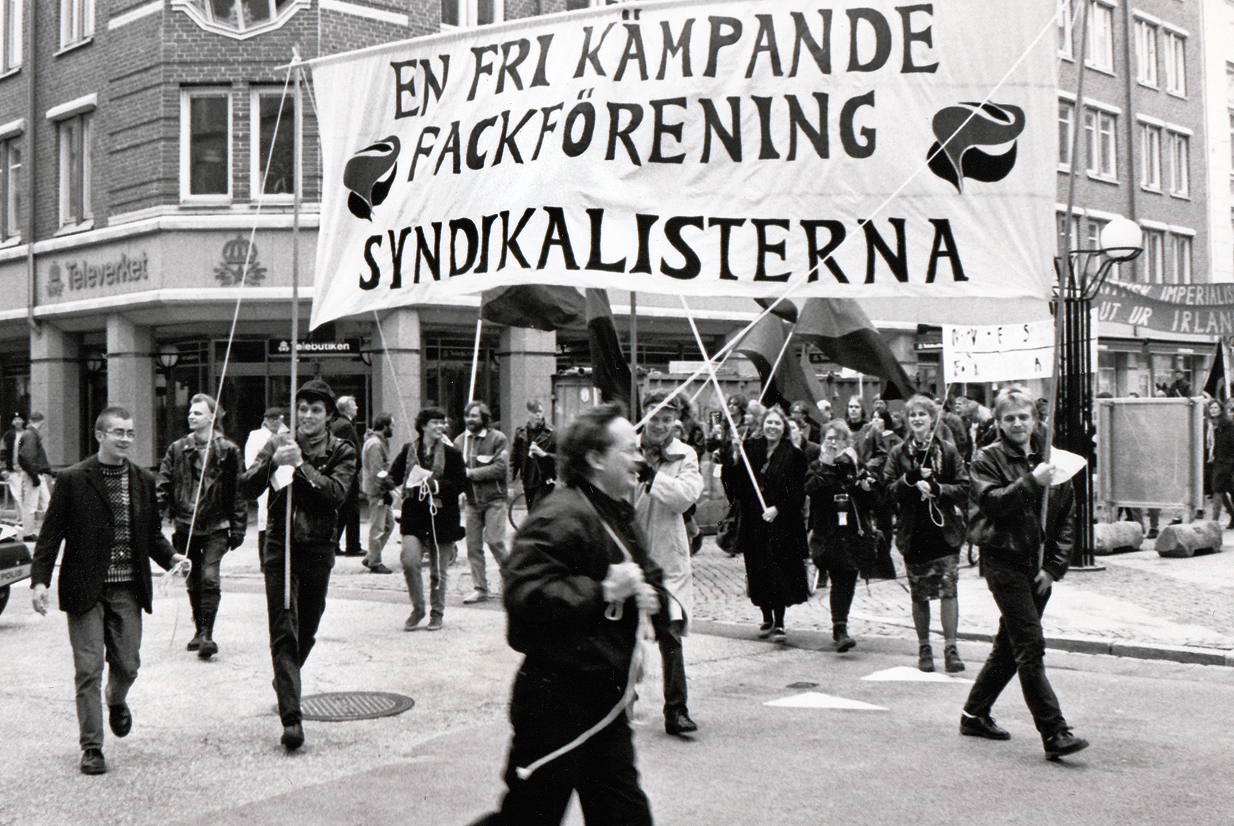
Members of the Central Organisation of the Workers of Sweden, marching on May Day 1991 in Malmö

The first path was followed by the IWA, which in the 1950s adopted a series of resolutions to reaffirm its anarcho-syndicalist principles, rejecting collaboration with statist forces and renouncing its previously held position of "tactical autonomy". This caused a split in the IWA, with the Dutch and Swedish sections leaving the international in 1958. The second path was taken by the SAC, which decided to revise its principles to keep up with modernisation, while continuing to call itself anarcho-syndicalist. This revisionist tendency was influenced by the German syndicalist Helmut Rüdiger, who argued against the "orthodoxy" of anti-statism. Rüdiger posited that new social conditions meant that the abolition of the state would not only abolish the apparatus of oppression but also the new systems of welfare, the latter of which he believed workers would never consent to. He instead proposed that anarcho-syndicalists, rather than waiting for a future social revolution, ought to act within the existing system to reform it towards increased democratisation, which he felt justified working within united fronts and participating in local elections. With this new outlook, the SAC began to participate in the Swedish welfare state, taking a key role in the administration of unemployment insurance funds. In 1952, members of the SAC approved a declaration that its goal was to establish an industrial democracy by progressively transferring control over private and public enterprises from shareholders to workers. The organisation renounced what Evert Arvidsson described as the "magic wand of revolution", instead taking the role of the left-wing opposition within the Swedish welfare system. The SAC's establishment of unemployment insurance funds worked to bring more workers into its ranks, but also made it a target of criticism from the international anarcho-syndicalist movement, which denounced it for reformism and collaborationism.

By the 1960s, the IWA had declined to its lowest point, as anarcho-syndicalists became largely preoccupied with providing theoretical analyses of new developments in both capitalist and socialist states. It was only after the protests of 1968 and the Spanish transition to democracy that the anarcho-syndicalist movement began to experience a revival. The CNT once again rose to prominence in Spain, growing to represent 300,000 members by the end of the 1970s, but it ultimately failed to become a leading force in the post-Francoist period. Meanwhile, new anarcho-syndicalist organisations were established in countries throughout Europe. During the 1980s, globalisation and neoliberalism led to the dismantling of welfare states in the West, while the Eastern Bloc collapsed in the Revolutions of 1989. This caused a crisis in left-wing politics, as social-democratic parties adopted neoliberalism and mainstream trade unions were unable to prevent the worsening of living and working conditions, with many workers facing increased precarity. Anarcho-syndicalists considered this to be a moment that demonstrated the problems inherent to capitalism and the state, and once again began to present libertarian socialism as a necessary alternative to the existing system.

== Contemporary revival ==
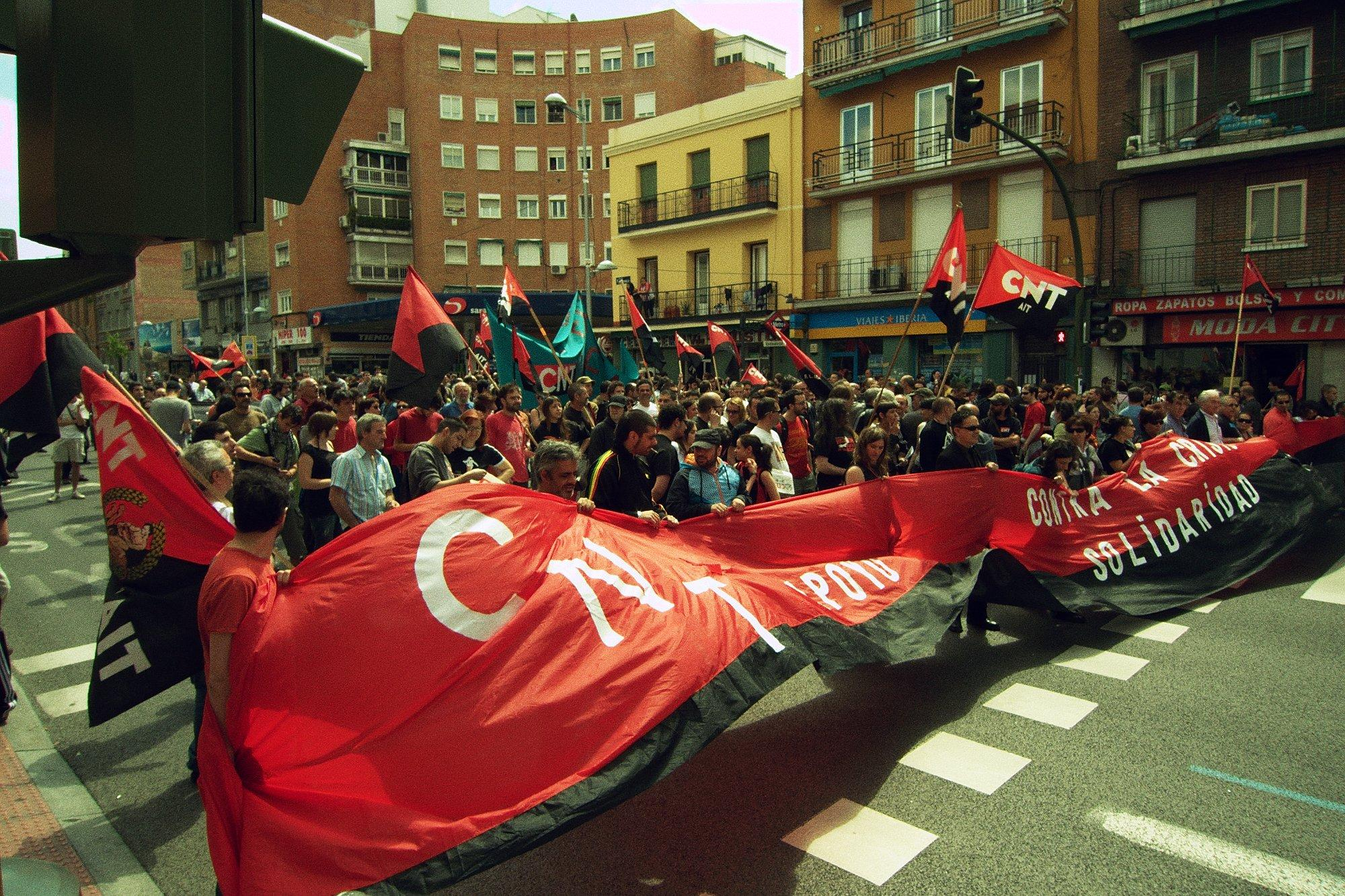
Members of the Spanish anarcho-syndicalist trade union CNT marching in Madrid in 2010

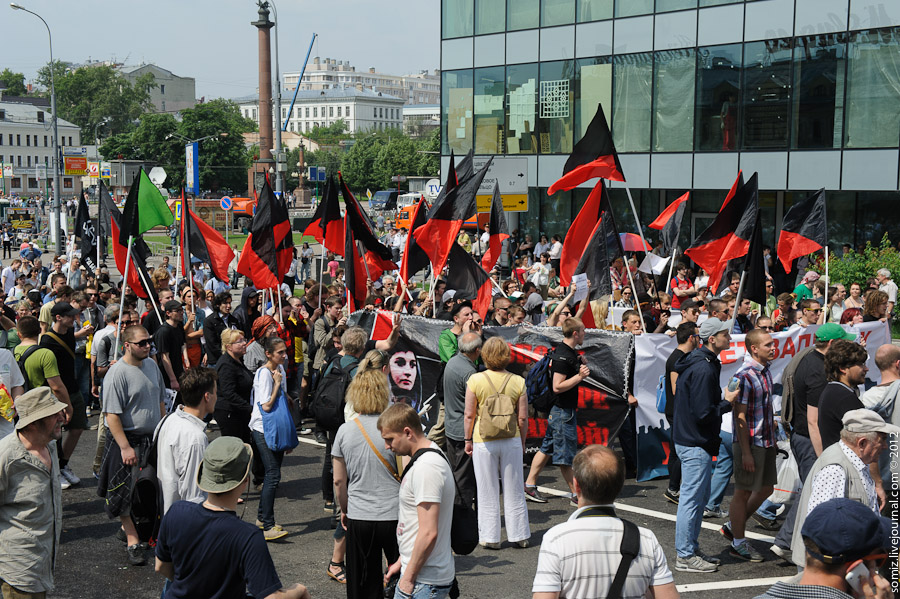
Anarcho-syndicalists in Russia

By the turn of the 21st century, anarcho-syndicalism had experienced a revival, as anarcho-syndicalist organisations re-emerged throughout the globe. In Europe and the Americas, pre-existing and dormant organisations were revitalised, while entirely new organisations were established in Africa and Asia. The FORA was reestablished in Argentina, while the Spanish CNT, French CNT and Italian USI became more active. Anarcho-syndicalist groups were established in Indonesia, Nigeria and Syria, and a branch of the IWW was founded in Sierra Leone. This also coincided with the revival of the agrarian socialist movement, as organisations affiliated with the Via Campesina began coordinating indigenous and peasant resistance to neoliberalism and globalisation.

Although they remained relatively small, these organisations reoriented themselves towards radicalising existing initiatives of workers' self-management and self-organisation, rather than trying to take the leadership in the workers' movement. Anarcho-syndicalists became more present in social conflicts, with the Spanish CNT growing to count 10,000 members and participating in some of the country's most radical strike actions. In Puerto Real, workers' assemblies spearheaded by the CNT organised a mass strike and took forms of direct action against the closure of the local shipyard. Striking workers erected barricades throughout the city, clashed with the police in street battles and sabotaged infrastructure, eventually securing the maintenance of the port.

Into the 2000s, the CNT organised a series of mass strikes in cities throughout Spain, while the USI participated in a number of general strikes in Italy. In post-communist Russia, anarcho-syndicalism was revived by the Confederation of Revolutionary Anarcho-Syndicalists (KRAS), which has participated in a series of strike actions, distributed anarchist propaganda and engaged in anti-militarist activism. By 2007, the IWA had grown to include 16 affiliate sections, representing organisations from throughout the world. That same year, a revolutionary syndicalist summit brought together 250 delegates from throughout the world, with African unions representing the largest delegation.

The contemporary anarcho-syndicalist revival also brought with it a new wave of splits, as new syndicates were formed with the intention of seeking a mass base, participating in works councils and achieving social reforms. These new organisations included the General Confederation of Labour (CGT), which broke off from the Spanish CNT in 1984; the CNT-F, which separated from the French CNT in 1995; and the Italian COBAS. Within decades, the CGT had grown to become Spain's third-largest union, representing over two million workers, while the COBAS counted hundreds of thousands of workers in its ranks. Together, these organisations founded a new international, the European Federation of Alternative Syndicalism, in 2003.

== Bibliography ==
- Beevor, Antony (2006). Battle for Spain the Spanish Civil War, 1936-1939. New York: Penguin Books. ISBN 0-14-303765-X.
- Damier, Vadim (2009) [2000]. Anarcho-syndicalism in the 20th Century. Translated by Archibald, Malcolm. Edmonton: Black Cat Press. ISBN 978-0-9737827-6-9.
- Durgan, Andrew (2009). "Spanish Revolution". The International Encyclopedia of Revolution and Protest. John Wiley & Sons. pp. 1–23. doi:10.1002/9781405198073.wbierp1391. ISBN 978-1-4051-9807-3.
- Graham, Robert (2018). "Anarchism and the First International". In Adams, Matthew S.; Levy, Carl (eds.). The Palgrave Handbook of Anarchism. London: Palgrave Macmillan. pp. 325–342. doi:10.1007/978-3-319-75620-2_19. ISBN 978-3319756196. S2CID 158605651.
- Hirsch, Steven J.; van der Walt, Lucien (2010a). "Rethinking Anarchism and Syndicalism: the colonial and postcolonial experience, 1870–1940". In Hirsch, Steven J.; van der Walt, Lucien (eds.). Anarchism and Syndicalism in the Colonial and Postcolonial World, 1870–1940. Studies in Global Social History. Vol. 6. Leiden: Brill. pp. xxxi–lxxiii. ISBN 9789004188495. OCLC 868808983.
- Hirsch, Steven J.; van der Walt, Lucien (2010b). "Final Reflections: the vicissitudes of anarchist and syndicalist trajectories, 1940 to the present". In Hirsch, Steven J.; van der Walt, Lucien (eds.). Anarchism and Syndicalism in the Colonial and Postcolonial World, 1870–1940. Studies in Global Social History. Vol. 6. Leiden: Brill. pp. 395–412. ISBN 9789004188495. OCLC 868808983.
- Roca Martínez, Beltrán (2006). "Anarchism, anthropology and Andalucia: an analysis of the CNT and 'New Capitalism'" (PDF). Anarchist Studies. 14 (2). London: Lawrence & Wishart: 106–130. ISSN 0967-3393. Archived from the original (PDF) on 28 February 2011.
- Rocker, Rudolf (1989) [1938]. Anarcho-Syndicalism. Pluto Press. ISBN 0-7453-1392-2.
- Thorpe, Wayne (1989). The Workers Themselves. Kluwer Academic Publishers. ISBN 0-7923-0276-1. LCCN 89-8205.
- van der Walt, Lucien; Schmidt, Michael (2009). Black Flame: The Revolutionary Class Politics of Anarchism and Syndicalism. Edinburgh: AK Press. ISBN 978-1-904859-16-1. LCCN 2006933558. OCLC 1100238201.
- van der Walt, Lucien (2016). "Global Anarchism and Syndicalism: Theory, History, Resistance". Anarchist Studies. 24 (1): 85–106. ISSN 0967-3393.
- van der Walt, Lucien (2018). "Syndicalism". In Adams, Matthew S.; Levy, Carl (eds.). The Palgrave Handbook of Anarchism. London: Palgrave Macmillan. pp. 249–264. doi:10.1007/978-3-319-75620-2_14. ISBN 978-3319756196. S2CID 242074567.
- Zimmer, Kenyon (2018). "Haymarket and the Rise of Syndicalism". In Adams, Matthew S.; Levy, Carl (eds.). The Palgrave Handbook of Anarchism. London: Palgrave Macmillan. pp. 353–370. doi:10.1007/978-3-319-75620-2_21. ISBN 978-3319756196. S2CID 242074567.
