= Pierre Semard =

French politician (1887–1942)

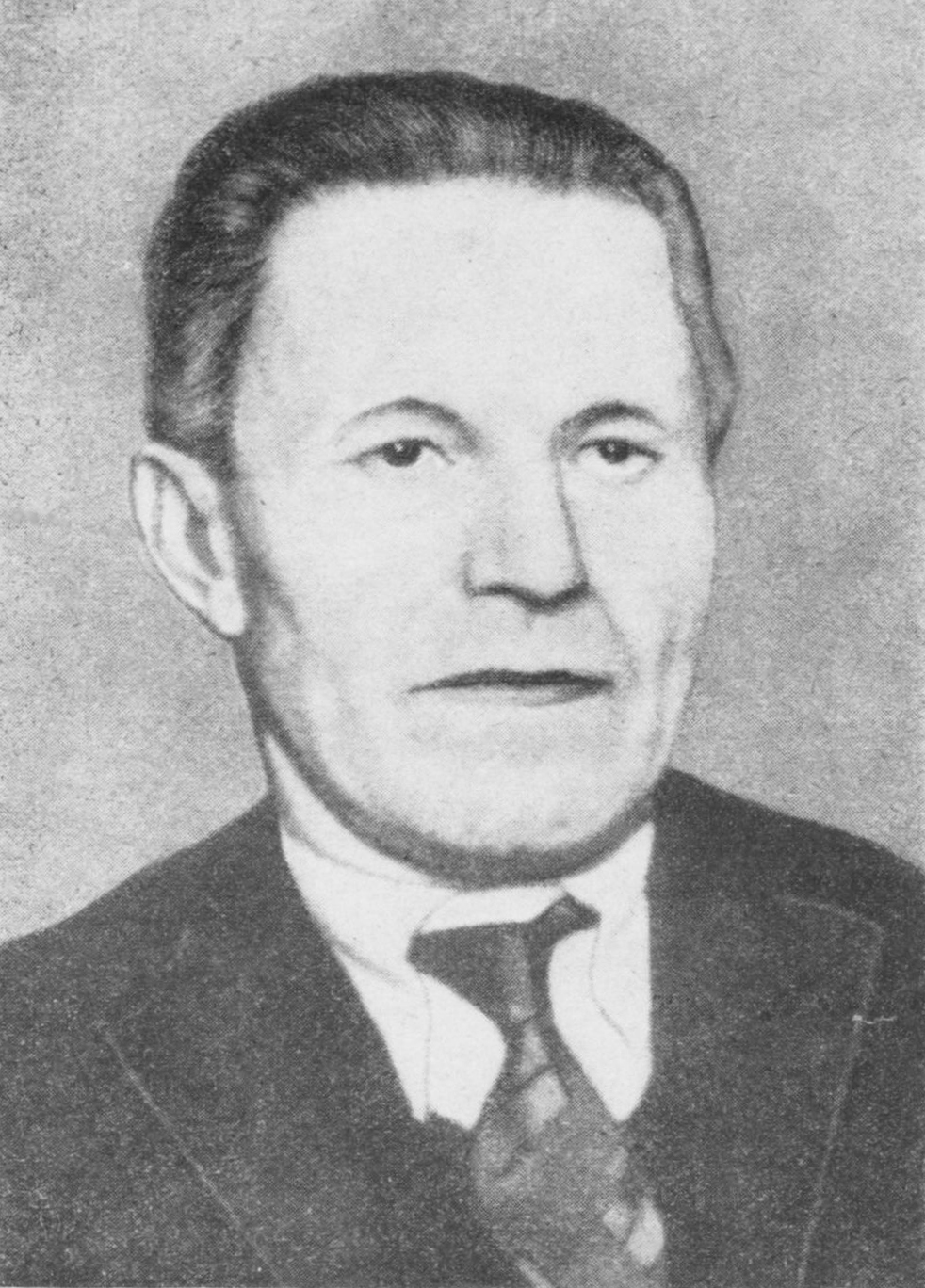
- Pierre Semard in a portrait published from the report of the 8th Congress of the PCF. January, 1936

Secretary General of the Communist Party of France
- In office July 8, 1924 – April 8, 1929
- Preceded by: Louis Sellier
- Succeeded by: Collective leadership

Personal details
- Born: February 15, 1887 Bragny-sur-Saône, Saône-et-Loire, France
- Died: 7 March 1942 (aged 55) Évreux, Eure, France
- Party: Communist Party of France; French Section of the Workers' International (1916-1922)
- Occupation: Politician, trade unionist

Pierre Semard (15 February 1887 – 7 March 1942) was a trade unionist, secretary general of the federation of railway-workers and leader of the French Communist Party (acting as its secretary general from 1924 to 1928). He was shot in prison by the Nazi occupiers in 1942, and is buried at the Père Lachaise Cemetery in Paris. He was key figure in the French Section of the Workers' International (SFIO) and a trade unionist in the Confédération générale du travail unitaire (CGTU) and Confédération générale du travail (CGT).

== Life ==
=== Childhood and youth ===
He was born on February 15, 1887 in Bragny-sur-Saône, department of Saône-et-Loire in the family of railway workers. He spent his childhood in Villeneuve-sur-Yonne, department of Yonne. Followed his parents' footsteps, from the age of 13 he also started working on the railway.

=== Unionist militant ===
From 1906 he took an active part in the trade union movement alongside Pierre Monatte and In 1916 he joined the French Section of the Workers' International (SFIO)

In 1921-1922 he was General Secretary of the Railway Workers' Trade Union, from 1922 to 1924 and again from 1933 to 1936 - General Secretary of the United Trade Union of Railway Workers.

=== Communist leader ===
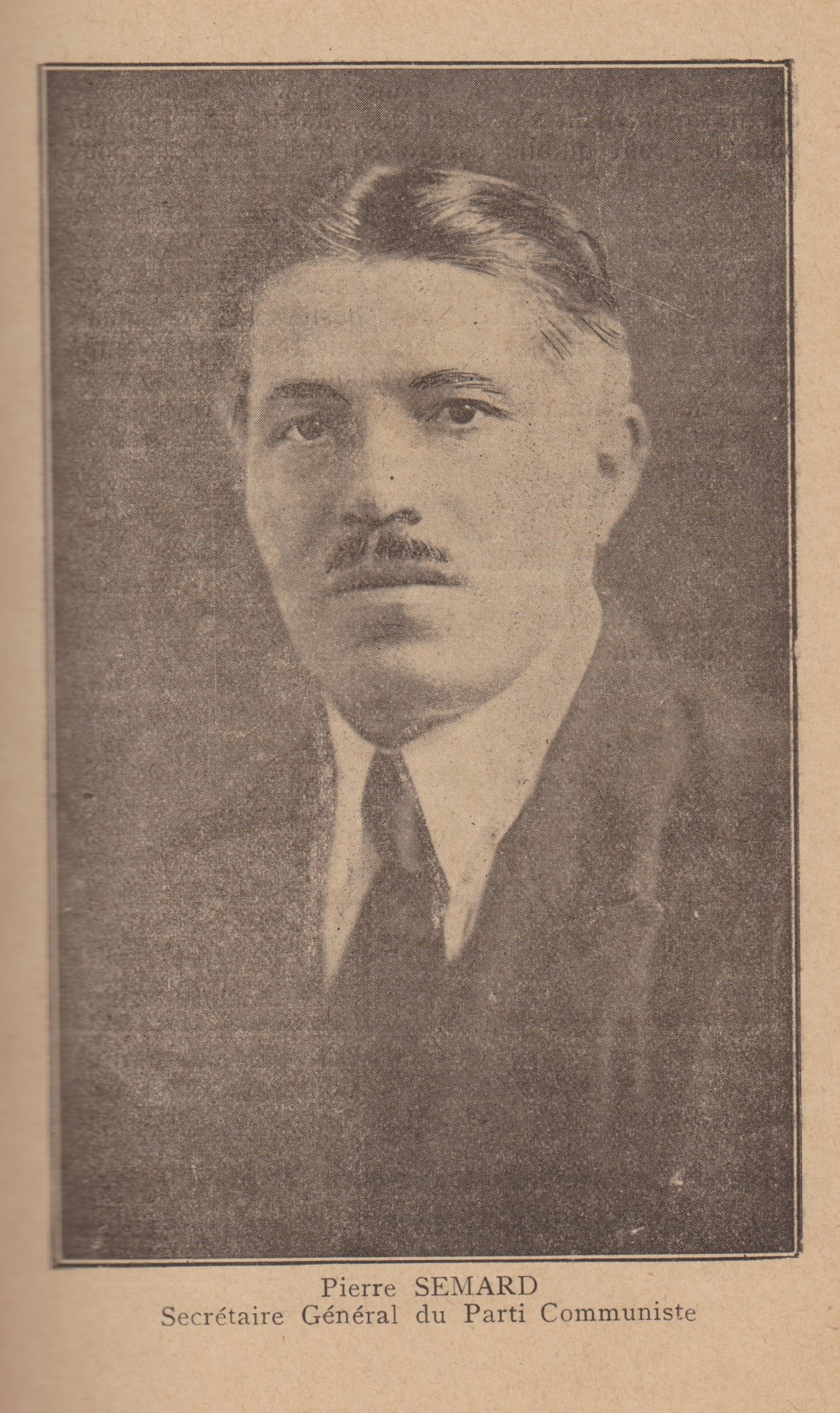
Official portrait if Semard as Communist Party general secretary in 1924

In November 1922, Semard met Lenin in Moscow with the company of Gaston Monmousseau. Lenin made concessions to his interlocutors, so that back in France, Semard justified the CGTU's membership in the SRI. He then joined the Communist Party in joint action against the occupation of the Ruhr. For this he was arrested and imprisoned in 1923 for a few months in the Prison of Health. During his imprisonment, he wrote numerous articles in La Vie Ouvrière where he pleaded in particular for open mass unionism that did not assert any doctrine.

Despite these positions and his sympathy for anarcho syndicalism, which were far removed from those of the Communist International he became general secretary of the Communist Party in 1924.

He was relieved of his position as general secretary in 1929 and became head of the Paris section of the PCF. In 1935 he was elected to the General Council of the Seine Department.

=== Return to unionism ===
After being pushed away from the PCF's leadership he continued his unionist activities: from 1936, he was Secretary General of the United Federation of Railway Workers of France and Algeria, member of the Executive Committee of the General Confederation of Labour. He supported the policy of nationalization of the railways by the government of Léon Blum. He provided assistance to the Republicans during the Spanish Civil War.

=== Second World War ===
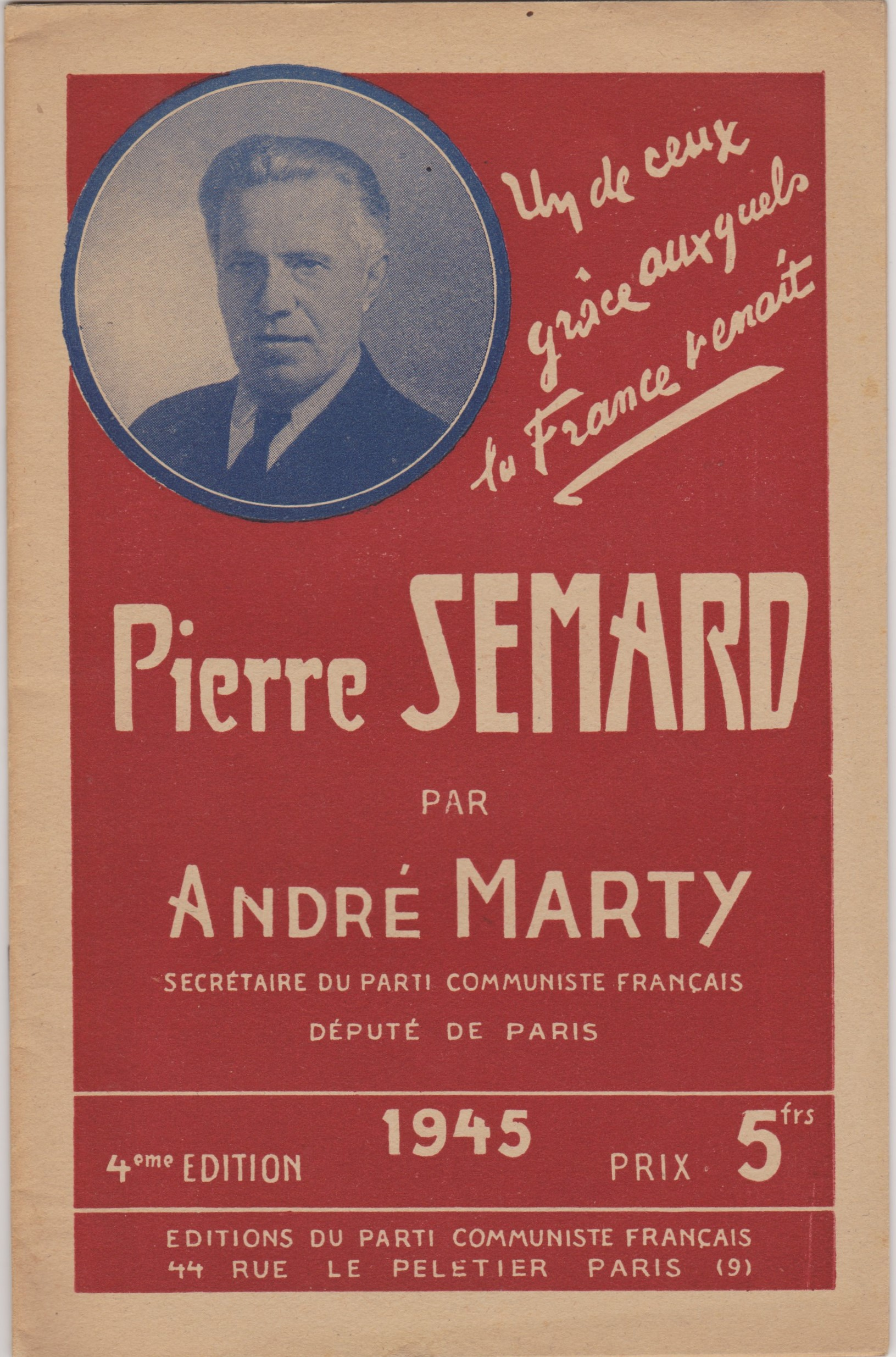
1945 Communist Party brochure in honour of Pierre Semard

After the Molotov–Ribbentrop Pact he was dismissed from his role as the Councillor of the Seine Department and returned to work as a railway worker and was later imprisoned on accounts of embezzlement.

During the German invasion of France he was evacuated to another prison. In the beginning of 1942, Pierre Semard was transferred from Bourges to the Gaillon internment camp where he found himself with common law prisoners. In March 6, he was sent to Évreux prison, delivered at their request as a hostage to the German authorities, he was shot on March 7, 1942 alongside other political prisoners.

== Works ==
- Pour le Front unique des transports, 1923
- La Guerre du Rif, 1925.
- Histoire de la Fédération des cheminots, 1934.
- Transports en commun bon marché, 1936.
- « Entretien avec Lénine à l'occasion du IIe congrès du profintern », (retranslated from the Russian), Lénine tel qu'il fut, souvenirs de contemporains, vol. 2, Moscou, 1959.

== Sources ==
- Article by Serge Wokilow in Dictionnaire biographique du mouvement ouvrier, Éditions ouvrières.
- Philippe Robrieux, Histoire intérieure du parti communiste, Volume IV, Fayard, 1984.
