= Syndicalist Defense Committee (1915) =

French anti-war trade union centre

- Comité de Défense Syndicaliste
- Abbreviation: CDS
- Successor: United General Confederation of Labour
- Established: November 1915; 111 years ago
- Dissolved: May 1918; 108 years ago
- Type: Trade union centre
- Purpose: Opposition to World War I
- Headquarters: Saint-Étienne
- Location: France
- Leaders: Pierre Monatte; Raymond Péricat
- Publication: La Vie Ouvrière
- Parent organisation: General Confederation of Labour

The Syndicalist Defense Committee (French: Comité de Défense Syndicaliste; (Note: Also translated as the Committee for the Defense of Syndicalism, or Committee of Syndicalist Defense.) CDS) was a French anti-militarist trade union centre of the General Confederation of Labour (CGT). Established in 1915 to provide a syndicalist opposition to World War I, the CDS aimed to end French participation in the war through a general strike. The CDS was largely associated with construction workers' and metalworkers' unions in the Loire department, where anti-war trade unionists frequently organised pacifist strikes in order to improve working conditions and pressure the French government to end the war. These pacifist strikes culminated in May 1918, when the CDS led a general strike of hundreds of thousands of metal workers. The strike was suppressed, their leaders arrested and many striking workers were deployed to the front lines. Members of the CDS led the establishment of the first communist party in France, while the metalworkers' unions went on to form the United General Confederation of Labour (CGTU), a revolutionary splinter of the reformist-led CGT.

== Background ==
In the 1910s, revolutionary syndicalism began to experience a marked decline in France; as living conditions improved and wages increased, strike actions became less confrontational and more open to negotiations. In response to this new development in the industrial economy, the leadership of the General Confederation of Labour (CGT) moved the union away from revolutionary politics and towards reformism. The outbreak of World War I accelerated the decline of revolutionary syndicalism in France and exacerbated the crisis within the CGT.

Following the French entry into World War I, the leadership of the CGT took a defensist position. The CGT's federal bureau refused to call a general strike against militarisation and instead chose to collaborate with the French state. Secretary-general Léon Jouhaux himself argued for the revolutionary defense of French republicanism and democracy against German militarism. On 4 August 1914, the CGT joined the Sacred Union, pledging not to call any strike actions during the war and to accept the conscription of its members. During the first year of the war, the CGT's membership rapidly declined from 350,000 to 49,000, leaving the union a shell of its former self.

== Establishment ==
An internationalist and anti-militarist opposition quickly emerged within the CGT, grouped around the syndicalist newspaper La Vie Ouvrière. In December 1914, the newspaper's editor, the young syndicalist leader Pierre Monatte, resigned from the CGT's executive committee. Soon after, the metalworkers' union led by Alphonse Merrheim and Albert Bourderon joined the anti-war syndicalist opposition; in September 1915, Merrheim and Bourderon attended the anti-war Zimmerwald Conference, where they declared: "This war is not our war".

In November 1915, the anti-militarist minority of the CGT formed the Syndicalist Defense Committee (French: Comité de Défense Syndicaliste; CDS), which brought together revolutionary syndicalists and anarchists that opposed the war. The CDS was led by Pierre Monatte and Raymond Péricat, the secretary of the National Federation of Construction Workers. The CDS soon gained a strong influence in Loire, where local metalworkers' unions had taken a firm anti-war stance. During the war, these unions recruited women, foreign and mobilised workers, growing from 4,000 to 20,000 members and carrying out frequent strikes.

In opposing the war, the CDS referred to the Charter of Amiens, which called for class struggle "against any form of exploitation and oppression". The anarchists of the CDS took a position of revolutionary defeatism, advocating for an international workers' revolution to end the war. The CDS called for workers producing arms, ammunition and military vehicles to take direct action against the war, with the intention of building towards "a general strike for peace, so as to force those in power to engage in peace negotiations."

== Pacifist strikes ==
By 1917, the Sacred Union was beginning to fracture, as working conditions deteriorated, the cost of living rose and the mass death caused in the war provoked widespread disillusionment. The CDS, as part of its campaign against the worsening living and working conditions in France, began openly supporting strike actions by French workers.

In January 1917, following a wave of strike actions throughout the country, the French government banned strikes in the military industry and established an arbitration procedure, while promising to raise wages and improve working conditions. The metalworkers' unions came out against the new measures, as wages failed to increase, while they concluded that the arbitration procedures served to undermine trade unionism. Another wave of strikes followed in the summer of 1917 and the metalworkers' unions ousted remaining moderate union leaders. They also established an Intercorporate Committee (French: Comité Intercorporatif; CI) to coordinate with the department's other major industrial unions, including Péricat's construction workers' union, and to keep contact with the Paris-based syndicalists of the CDS.

In November 1917, the government of Georges Clemenceau declared that pacifist and anti-militarist actions would be treated as treason, launching a crackdown against the CDS and other pacifist unions. As pacifist workers were increasingly arrested, trade unions led by the CDS closed ranks and defended themselves against the political repression. When metalworkers' union secretary Clovis Andrieu was arrested and transferred to the front lines, between 100,000 and 200,000 workers carried out a general strike, forcing the government to negotiate a new agreement with the metalworkers and release Andrieu. This marked the beginning of a shift in the lines of demarcation within French syndicalism: from pro-war and anti-war factions to moderate and left-wing factions. The following month, in an attempt to reach a consensus between the two factions, a conference of the CGT voted to support both Woodrow Wilson's peace proposal and the Bolshevik Revolution in Russia. The CDS expressed a staunch support for the Bolsheviks, including their dissolution of the Russian Constituent Assembly and ratification of the Treaty of Brest-Litovsk.

Metalworkers' strikes dissipated during the early months of 1918, as the German spring offensive made French workers wary of taking strike action or agitating against the war. But once the French government began mobilising large numbers of young workers and transferring them to the front, metalworkers in the Loire once again began demonstrating against the war. The CDS took the opportunity to launch a new campaign to force the government to end the war.

The CDS organised a number of strike actions and held a series of regional meetings in Loire, with a conference in Saint-Étienne resolving to carry out a general strike in the construction and metallurgic industries. In May 1918, tens of thousands of workers demonstrated in the streets and carried out strike actions demanding an end to the war. Despite a large turnout in Loire, where strikes were organised by the CI, the strike largely failed to gain traction elsewhere. For its own part, the CDS organised a 200,000-strong metalworkers' strike against the war, but this was quickly repressed by the state. The strike's leaders, including Péricat and Andrieu, were arrested and more than 100 striking workers were transferred to the front. By the end of May 1918, the CDS had been effectively broken up. Loire saw no more strike actions until the end of the war, when the arrested workers were released.

== Aftermath ==
The conclusion of the war momentarily demobilised the labour movement, which only began to take action and reorganise itself again in the spring of 1919. During this period, former members of the CDS moved towards communism, with Péricat proclaiming the establishment of a Communist Party in May 1919.

Meanwhile, tensions within the CGT heightened, as the reformist majority and revolutionary minority became increasingly polarised against each other. In 1922, revolutionary syndicalists (including the Loire metalworkers' unions) established the United General Confederation of Labour (CGTU), which affiliated with the Red International of Labour Unions (RILU). Libertarians within the CGTU objected to the affiliation and split off to establish their own organisation, which also bore the name Syndicalist Defense Committee, and affiliated themselves with the International Workers' Association (IWA).

== See also ==
- Caroline Amblard – French trade unionist and dramatist (1872–1939)

== Bibliography ==
- Bantman, Constance; Berry, David (2017). "The French Anarchist Movement and the First World War". In Adams, Matthew; Kinna, Ruth (eds.). Anarchism, 1914–18: Internationalism, anti-militarism and war. Manchester University Press. pp. 155–174. doi:10.7765/9781526115768.00015. ISBN 9781526115768.
- Damier, Vadim (2009) [2000]. Anarcho-syndicalism in the 20th Century. Translated by Archibald, Malcolm. Edmonton: Black Cat Press. ISBN 978-0-9737827-6-9.
- Darlington, Ralph (2008). "Internal Divisions". Syndicalism and the Transition to Communism: An International Comparative Analysis. Ashgate Publishing. pp. 127–144. ISBN 978-0-7546-3617-5.
- Haddad, Galit (2014). "Labour Movements and Strikes, Social Conflict and Control, Protest and Repression (France)". In Daniel, Ute; Gatrell, Peter; Janz, Oliver; Jones, Heather; Keene, Jennifer; Kramer, Alan; Nasson, Bill (eds.). International Encyclopedia of the First World War. Free University of Berlin. pp. 1–11. doi:10.15463/ie1418.10328.
- Horne, John (1993). "The State and the Challenge of Labour in France 1917–20". In Wrigley, Chris (ed.). Challenges of Labour. Routledge. pp. 251–273. doi:10.4324/9780203202081-16. ISBN 9780203202081.
- Hudson, Mark (2003). "Rank and file Metalworker Militancy in France and Britain, 1890-1918". New Politics. 9 (3): 138. ISSN 0028-6494.
- Parry, D.L.L. (1994). "Clemenceau, Caillaux and the political use of intelligence". Intelligence and National Security. 9 (3): 472–494. doi:10.1080/02684529408432262.
- Thorpe, Wayne (1989). The Workers Themselves. Kluwer Academic Publishers. ISBN 0-7923-0276-1. LCCN 89-8205.
- Tosstorff, Reiner (2004). "From the First to the Second Congress of the RILU". The Red International of Labour Unions (RILU) 1920 - 1937. Brill. pp. 422–608. doi:10.1163/9789004325579_007. ISBN 9789004325579.
