= Amblard =

Amblard is a surname. Notable people with the surname include:

- Aurélie Amblard, French actress
- Blanche Amblard, French tennis player
- Caroline Amblard, French dramatist and trade unionist
- Suzanne Amblard, French tennis player
