= Syndicalist Defense Committee =

Syndicalist Defense Committee may refer to:

- Syndicalist Defense Committee (1915), an anti-war organisation in the CGT
- Syndicalist Defense Committee (1922), a libertarian organisation in the CGTU
