= Robert Louzon =

French revolutionary (1882–1976)

Robert Louzon (1882–1976) was a French engineer, revolutionary syndicalist, anarchist and socialist.

Louzon was involved in the Confédération générale du travail and then in the anarchist Confédération nationale du travail (CNT). He helped found the journal La Révolution prolétarienne with the syndicalist trade-unionist Pierre Monatte, the first issue published in January 2025. In 1929 he joined the Communist Party of France, to leave shortly after. He later joined the SIA (Solidarité Internationale antifasciste) and signed Louis Lecoin's Paix immédiate. During World War II he was arrested and interned in Algeria.

== Biography ==
Louzon was born on 30 June 1882 in the 9th arrondissement of Paris (France). He was the eldest son of Paul Julien Georges Louzon, a lawyer, and Eugénie Justine Barast. He studied at the Parisian institute of Janson-de-Sailly. He obtained a doctorate in Law with a thesis on the ownership of mines in France. He studied engineering at the Ecole des Mines. He worked as an engineer in various Spanish mines, got a job with the Société du Gaz de Paris (Paris Gas Company) as an engineer, and later was director of the Saint-Mandé gasworks.

In 1899, Louzon joined a Dreyfusard student group. He joined the Revolutionary Socialist Workers' Party in 1900, and the French Section of the Workers' International (SFIO) in 1905. Under the influence of Émile Pouget's newspaper, Le Père Peinard, he was drawn to anarchism.

In the mid-1900s, he was involved in the General Confederation of Labour (CGT), and was a part of the circle around the syndicalist magazine Le Mouvement socialiste, edited by Hubert Lagardelle. In 1906, he lent the CGT 90,000 francs for the purchase of a building on Rue de la Grange-aux-Belles. When his employers discovered this, he was sacked.

He helped Monatte found and edit La Vie ouvrière, for which he wrote his first article in the December 1909 issue (on the French gas industry). In 1910, he spent time in Le Havre investigating the case of Jules Durand, a dockside union activist framed for a murder.

In 1913, he moved to Tunisia and took up farming. He served in the First World War as a Zouave captain (without qualms, according to historian Colette Chambelland, because he opposed German militarism) and earning a National Order of the Legion of Honour. He was active by 1919 in the Tunisian branch of the SFIO. The SFIO split at the Tours Congress at the end of 1920, with the left faction, including Louzon and the majority of his branch, founding the French Communist Party (PCF). Louzon became the Secretary of the PCF's Tunisian federation and editor of its journal L'Avenir Social. He was prosecuted in 1921 for a seditious article in this. He helped Tunisian Communist activist Mukhtar al-‘Ayari publish his journal Habib al-Umma.

Louzon was jailed for six months in 1922 in Algiers for his anti-colonial publications, and expelled from the colony. Released in August and returning to France (to the Cote d'Azure), he rejoined Monatte and La Vie ouvrière, and wrote on economics for the PCF's L'Humanité newspaper. He became close to the Left Opposition, led by Leon Trotsky, leaving the PCF in December 1924 when Monatte and Alfred Rosmer were expelled. But he didn't become a Trotskyist like them, remaining a revolutionary Syndicalist. He opposed Trotsky over the issue of Soviet control of the Chinese East Asian Railway.

From January 1925, he edited La Révolution prolétarienne.

In August 1936, with the Spanish Civil War, Louzon returned to North Africa, representing the Spanish syndicalist union movement, the Confederación Nacional del Trabajo (CNT), to combat Franco’s recruitment in the Spanish protectorate in Morocco. He joined the CNT militia at the Spanish front, aged 55. In February 1937, he served on the Aragon front in the International Group of the Durruti Column along with Simone Weil. He reported from there for La Révolution prolétarienne and was involved with Louis Lecoin in the Solidaridad Internacional Antifascista. He was tried in absentia in France for supporting Tunisia's independence movement (publishing a pamphlet entitled "Tunisia for the Tunisians”), condemned to 15 months in prison in July 1939, then arrested in May 1940 for an anti-war pamphlet ("Immediate Peace") written with Louis Lecoin and incarcerated in a detention camp in Algeria. He was released in August 1941 and returned to France, retiring to Cannes.

He resumed publication of La Révolution prolétarienne in 1947, printing it in Cannes. During the 1950s, he wrote, managed and printed the magazine Études Matérialistes. Sharply critical of Soviet totalitarianism, he was interested in Tito's version of socialism in Yugoslavia, which he visited. In 1960, alongside Jean Paul Sartre and others, he signed the Manifesto of the 121 in solidarity with the Algerian independence movement. He visited China, celebrating his 80th birthday in Beijing.

Louzon died on 8 September 1976 at his home, "Villa Marie", in Antibole, Provence.

== Personal life ==
Louzon married an anarchist activist, Marie Élisa Coquus, known as Eliksa or Élisa Brugnières, in October 1908 in the town hall of the 15th arrondissement of Paris. His partner from 1936 was Nonore Teissier, according to the recollections of Martial Desmoulins, and later Hélène Savanier, who survived him.

== Views ==
Louzon was a syndicalist. He was a disciple of Georges Sorel. When Sorel died in 1922, Louzon published a eulogy to him in La Vie ouvrier. He closely followed the activities of the syndicalist Industrial Workers of the World (IWW) in the US, often donating them and forming a friendship with IWW activist Bill Hayward.

Although in the 1900s he was part of the Dreyfusard movement, in solidarity with the Alfred Dreyfus (a French Jew targeted by the growing antisemitic movement), as with some other followers of Sorel (such as Hubert Lagardelle), Louzon expressed some antisemitic views. In "La faillite du Dreyfusisme ou le triomphe du parti juif", an article in Le Mouvement socialiste in 1906 when Dreyfus was acquitted, Louzon denounced "Semitism" and wrote that "there exists a party of which Judaism, thanks to its financial power, its commercial and intellectual activity, is in charge." He saw this "party" of Judaism as competing for dominance within the bourgeoisie with the party of "clericalism".

In his time in North Africa, Louzon became an advocate of decolonialism: In a 1922 article, he wrote that "there is no equivalence between the nationalism of an oppressor people whose nationalism consists in oppressing another people, and the nationalism of an oppressed people whose nationalism only tends to get rid of the oppressor people." He said that the European Communist "must not believe himself superior to the native because he wears a hat instead of a fez." He wrote in early 1923: “The necessary but not sufficient condition for a people to progress is independence. To keep natives in a state of servitude is a certain means of preserving the soul of a slave”. For Louzon, the “chauvinism” of some members of the French Communist Party, who saw colonial subjects as insufficiently “developed” to progress to socialism, had to be combated relentlessly.

Although he was close to Trotskyism, he was critical of Lenin and Trotsky. Monatte said "Louzon has never been and is not a Zimmerwaldian" and Rosmer was angered by Louzon’s comparison of Trotsky and Lenin's suppression of the Kronstadt rebellion with Thiers and Cavaignac's suppression of the Paris Commune. From 1924, he became an anti-Stalinist, seeing the Soviet Union as totalitarian. He condemned the Communists for betraying the Spanish revolution, writing in late 1937: "The present situation in Spain can be summed up in two facts: First: total loss of power by the working class; Second: transfer of power into the hands of the Spanish fascists, by the intermediary of the communist party."

He was a militant anti-fascist. In March 1933, shortly after Adolf Hitler had become Germany's Chancellor, Louzon called on “the European proletariat” to engage in “a fight to the death against the regime of Hitler and Mussolini.” As an immediate first measure, he proposed “the boycott of all products from the two countries where fascism reigns.”

After World War II, Louzon became a passionate anti-Zionist.

== Bibliography ==
- Le Régime légal de la propriété des mines en Prusse, Belgique et Hollande (thèse de doctorat), Giard et Brière, 1907.
- La Déchéance du capitalisme, Impr. spéciale de la Libr. du travail, 1923
- L'Économie capitaliste, principes d'économie politique, Librairie du travail, 1925.
- Impérialisme et nationalisme, Librairie du travail, 1926
- L'Ère de l'impérialisme, Spartacus, 1948.
- La Chine. Ses trois millénaires d'histoire, ses cinquante ans de révolution, Collection de la Révolution Prolétarienne - III, 1954
- La Dialectique scientifique, celle des choses et celle de l'esprit, Les éditions syndicalistes, 1970.
- Cent ans de capitalisme en Algérie, Acratie, 1998.
