= La Révolution prolétarienne =

French's magazine

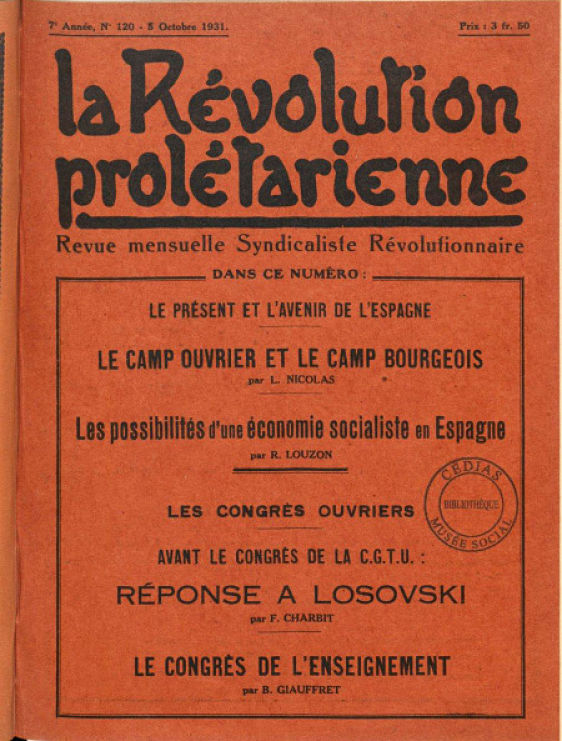
- Editor: Stéphane Julien
- Frequency: quarterly
- Format: A4
- Founder: Pierre Monatte and Robert Louzon
- Founded: 1925
- Country: France
- Based in: Paris
- Language: French
- Website: La Révolution prolétarienne

La Révolution prolétarienne was a syndicalist magazine established by Pierre Monatte and Robert Louzon in Paris in 1925.

Monatte was politically active for over twenty years as a syndicalist before joining the French Communist Party and advocating affiliation to the Comintern. By 1924 he was becoming increasingly critical of the autocracy he experienced in the party, which he saw as a denial of both Bolshevism and Communism. After writing an open letter to party members with Alfred Rosmer and Delagarde on 24 November 1924, they were expelled before the conference held on 5 December 1924. He retained a view of himself as a communist and launched La Révolution prolétarienne as a monthly syndicalist-communist magazine. The first issue included a second open letter to members of the Communist Party.

In 1939 La Révolution prolétarienne ceased publication, reappeared in 1947 and still exists.
