= Joseph Tommasi (communist) =

French artisan and communist leader

- Born: 26 July 1886
- Died: 29 May 1926 (aged 39)
- Occupations: Cabinet maker, mechanic
- Known for: Trade union and Communist leader

Joseph Tommasi (26 July 1886 – 29 May 1926) was a French artisan who became one of the leaders of the General Confederation of Labor (CGT: Confédération générale du travail) and the French Communist Party. He died in exile in Moscow at the age of about forty.

== Early years ==
Joseph Tommasi was born in 1886. He worked as a bicycle courier, a carpenter and then a mechanic. He joined the Socialist Party of France in 1904. Tommasi became a union activist, and during World War I (1914–18) supported the left wing of the CGT.

Tommasi became secretary of the Car and Aviation Workers Federation, and secretary of the GGT in 1919. In 1919 he was a member of the CGT administrative committee. At the CGT's first postwar congress, held in Lyon from 15 to 21 September 1919, Tommasi was among the leaders of the minority, with Pierre Monatte, Raymond Péricat and Gaston Monmousseau. This group denounced the CGT membership in the Amsterdam International of Labor Unions, said the CGT majority had broken with the principles of syndicalism and lost faith in revolution by dealing with the government. The minority wanted the CGT to join the Communist International.

== Communist ==
When the French Communist Party (PCF: Parti Communiste Français) was formed in December 1920 Tommasi was 34 years old and was working in the aviation industry. From 1921 to 1922 he was a member of the Communist Party executive committee. He was also a member of the political bureau of the party, and for a while was acting secretary-general. He was a delegate to the Third Congress of the Communist International in Moscow in June–July 1921, where he supported the Left current. At the request of Stepanov, Tommasi organized an intelligence network in France. Tommasi attended the congress in Saint-Étienne on 25 June – 1 July 1922 at which the syndicates, unions and federations that had been excluded from the CGT founded the Confédération générale du travail unitaire (CGTU). The dynamic new organization was attached to peace and to the anti-imperialist and anti-colonialist struggle.

The French police forced Tommasi into exile in 1924. He moved to Moscow, where he joined the Left Opposition led by Leon Trotsky. Joseph Tommasi died in 1926.

== Sources ==
- "Joseph Tommasi". Marxists.org.
- Riddell, John (2015-02-13). "Tommasi, Joseph [1886-1926]". To the Masses: Proceedings of the Third Congress of the Communist International, 1921. BRILL. ISBN 978-90-04-28803-4.
- Simon, Luis (1990). "L'Heritage Revolutionnaire de la C.G.T.". Hommage a Jaime Diaz-Rozzotto. Presses Univ. Franche-Comté. GGKEY:7AF9XRNU0JG.
- Wohl, Robert (1966-01-01). French Communism in the Making, 1914-1924. Stanford University Press. p. 216. ISBN 978-0-8047-0177-8.
