= Gaston Monmousseau =

French trade unionist (1883–1960)

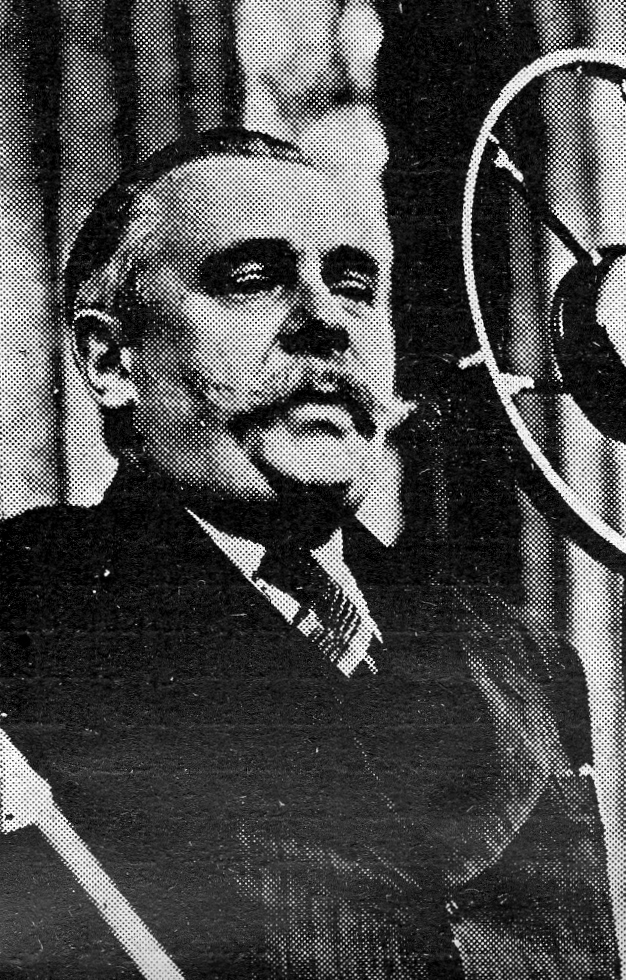
- Monmousseau speaking in Birkelunden, Oslo, Norway (1938)
- Born: 17 January 1883; Luynes, Indre-et-Loire, France
- Died: 11 July 1960 (aged 77); Paris, France
- Occupations: Trade union leader and politician
- Known for: Secretary-general of the CGTU

Gaston René Léon Monmousseau (17 January 1883 – 11 July 1960) was a French railway worker, trade union leader, politician and author, from a rural working-class background. He became an anarcho-syndicalist, then a communist, and played a leading role in the French Communist Party and in the national trade union movement both before and after World War II (1939–45).

== Early years ==
Gaston Monmousseau was born on 17 January 1883 in Luynes, Indre-et-Loire. His parents were Jean and Marie-Silvine Monmousseau. In his autobiography he describes himself as coming from a family of serfs attached to the Duke of Luynes. His grandfather was a Republican during the Second French Empire and his father was a radical after the Paris Commune, then a socialist against the decay of radicalism, and then a communist against the decay of socialism. Gaston Monmousseau grew up in the village of Azay-sur-Cher. After leaving school he apprenticed with a carpenter in Luynes, then moved to Tours where he worked as a carpenter. Although he had no more than elementary education, he later managed to teach himself to write and speak effectively.

== Anarcho-syndicalist ==
After his military service Monmousseau joined the state railway in Paris in 1910. He became an anarcho-syndicalist, and was active in the railway workers' union. In January 1913 he organized an anti-militarist rally in a hotel in Azay-sur-Cher. During World War I (1914–18) he worked on railway maintenance. He was enthusiastic about the 1917 October Revolution in Russia. This gave him an enduring internationalist and pacifist outlook. He wrote later,

If someone had said to us at that moment, "You are blindly following Lenin," they would have been saying only the strict truth. But if they had added, "You are merely adoring the Leninist deity," we would have responded in all simplicity, "We do not know exactly what Leninism is, but we love and follow Lenin because he is the leader of the Socialist Revolution, and we are revolutionaries."

At the first postwar congress of the General Confederation of Labor (CGT: Confédération générale du travail), held in Lyon from 15 to 21 September 1919, Monmousseau was among the leaders of the minority, with Pierre Monatte, Raymond Péricat and Joseph Tommasi. This group denounced the CGT membership in the Amsterdam International of Labor Unions, and said the CGT majority had broken with the principles of syndicalism and lost faith in revolution by dealing with the government. The minority wanted the CGT to join the Communist International, seize power and establish a dictatorship of the proletariat. They led a committee of 26 minority unions that was formed in October 1919, later named the Comité Syndicaliste Révolutionnaire (CST). In April 1920 Monmousseau was elected propaganda secretary for the railway workers federation and was arrested, along with Souvarine and Monatte, for plotting against state security. He was released in February 1921.

Monmousseau was secretary-general of the Association of Trade Unions of the Paris district from 1921 to 1922. In January 1922 he replaced Pierre Monatte in running La Vie Ouvrière. He would be director of this journal until 1960. As a member of the anarcho-syndicalist minority of the CGT, Gaston Monmousseau became General Secretary of the United General Confederation of Labor (CGTU: Confédération générale du travail unitaire) after the split between CGT reformists and revolutionaries, a position he held until 1933. In November 1922 he represented the CGTU at the second congress of the Red International of Trade Unions (Profintern) in Moscow. He met Vladimir Lenin, and according to his memoirs was greatly impressed. In January 1923 he participated in the International Congress on "Imperialism and War" organized against the occupation of the Ruhr by French troops. He was imprisoned until May 1923. In August 1924 Monmousseau participated in the third Profintern congress in Moscow.

== Communist ==
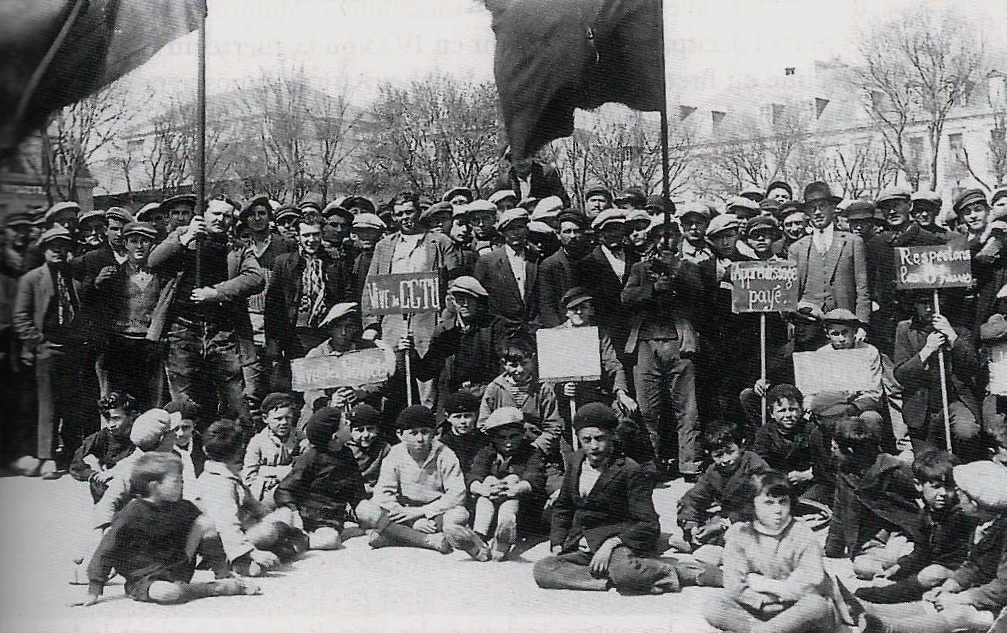
Demonstration of CGTU construction workers, Concarneau, Brittany, 1929

Monmousseau was pragmatic, and although he did not abandon his syndicalist beliefs, he could accept the need for a strong, repressive state to steer the revolution. Monmousseau joined the French Communist Party in 1925. He was a member of the French party's Central Committee from 1926 to 1945, and a member of the Profintern Executive Committee from 1926 to 1937. He was jailed in 1927 for organizing strikes against the war in Morocco. After his release, on 5 October 1927 he married Marcelle Louise Alice Legendre in Courçay, Indre-et-Loire. In September 1929, as a deputy member of the Comintern Executive Committee, he was charged with plotting against state security and imprisoned until May 1930. He was jailed again in April 1931, and held for four months. In 1932 he visited Moscow where he worked in the Profintern secretariat. He was a member of the Politburo of the Communist Party from 1932 to 1945. In 1935 he was elected to the International Control Commission at the Seventh Congress of the Comintern.

In 1936 Monmousseau participated in bringing the CGTU back into the reunified CGT. On 26 April 1936 he was elected a deputy for the Seine in the first round of voting. He sat with the Communist group, and was mainly involved in social laws. The French Communist Party was dissolved in 1939 and he went underground. He was convicted in absentia and lost his position as deputy. During World War II (1939–45) he was an organizer of the French Resistance. His only son died in a concentration camp at Dachau.

After the Liberation of Paris Monmousseau was appointed one of the twelve members of the Confederal Bureau of the CGT in September 1944. The priority after the war was reconstruction. The three parties that governed France after until mid-1947 were the Socialists, the Catholic Popular Republican Movement and the Communists. The Communists soon showed they were strongest, and promoted cooperation in reconstruction. Monmousseau told the Paris region convention of the CGT in 1946, "Yesterday we were in the opposition, and we could permit ourselves some vagaries. Today it is the trusts who are opposition, and we who bear the responsibilities." In 1952 the National Committee of the Communist Party decided to turn their boring weekly Le Peuple into a bimonthly journal, and to make La Vie Ouvrière their official organ. Monmousseau, who directed the Vie Ouvrière, was delighted. By this time his paper had become a strident and polemical sheet that had abandoned all pretense of concern with morality and individual dignity. From 1956 to 1960 Monmousseau was again a member of the Central Committee of the French Communist Party. Monmousseau died in Paris on 11 July 1960 aged 77.

== Selected publications ==
Monmousseau contributed to many magazines and newspapers including Le Libertaire, Le Journal du Peuple and L'Humanité. He published several works under the pseudonym Jean Brécot, including activist works and memoirs.

- Monmousseau, Gaston; Brécot, Jean; Lémont, Pierre. Jean Brécot. La grande grève de mai 1920 et la lutte actuelle des fonctionnaires. Critique de Jean Brécot par G. Monmousseau. [Préface de Pierre Lémont]. Editions syndicales internationales.
- Monmousseau, Gaston (1922). Le Contrôle syndical et les Comités d'usine: problèmes révolutionnaires. Union des syndicats ouvriers du département de la Seine.
- Frachon, Benoît; Monmousseau, Gaston (1934). Pour une C.G.T. unique ! Pour l'action de masse ! Discours prononcés à la Conférence nationale du parti communiste, Ivry, juin 1934. Impr. d'art Voltaire, 34, rue Richer; les Publications révolutionnaires, 120, rue Lafayette.
- Lenin, Vladimir Ilitch Oulianov; Monmousseau, Gaston (1949). Du Rôle et des tâches des syndicats dans les conditions de la nouvelle politique économique: Préface de G. Monmousseau. Éditions sociales (Impressions rapides).
- Vallès, Jules; Monmousseau, Gaston (1950). Les Oeuvres de Jules Vallès... [1.] Jacques Vingtras: 1. L'Enfant. Avec une préface de Gaston Monmousseau. les Éditeurs français réunis (Impr. la Sopac).
- Monmousseau, Gaston (1951). La Musette de Jean Brécot: natif de Touraine. Éditeurs Français Réunis.
- Monmousseau, Gaston (1951). Indre-et-Loire, chef-lieu Tours, selon Jean Brécot. Éditeurs français réunis.
- Monmousseau, Gaston (1953). L'oncle Eugène: selon Jean Brécot. Éditeurs français réunis.
- Monmousseau, Gaston; Brécot, Jean (1957). Le père Tomori, ou, L'Albanie selon Jean Brécot. Les Editeurs français réunis.
- Monmousseau, Gaston (1963). La musette: textes choisis, suivis d'une biographie illustrée. Éditions sociales.
- Monmousseau, Gaston (1969). Critique et autocritique. Editions Git-le-coeur.

== Sources ==
- Lorwin, Val Rogin (1954-01-01). The French Labor Movement. Harvard University Press. p. 106. ISBN 978-0-674-32200-4.
- "Monmousseau, Gaston". The Great Soviet Encyclopedia, 3rd Edition (1970-1979). The Gale Group. 2010.
- Pottier, Georges-François (2013). "IL Y A 130 ANS NAISSAIT EN TOURAINE – GASTON MONMOUSSEAU (1883-1960) SYNDICALISTE, HOMME POLITIQUE ET ÉCRIVAIN" (in French). Archives départementales d'Indre-et-Loire. Archived from the original on 2015-04-02.
- Wohl, Robert (1966-01-01). French Communism in the Making, 1914-1924. Stanford University Press. ISBN 978-0-8047-0177-8.
