= Confédération générale du travail unitaire =

Trade union of France

- United General Confederation of Labour
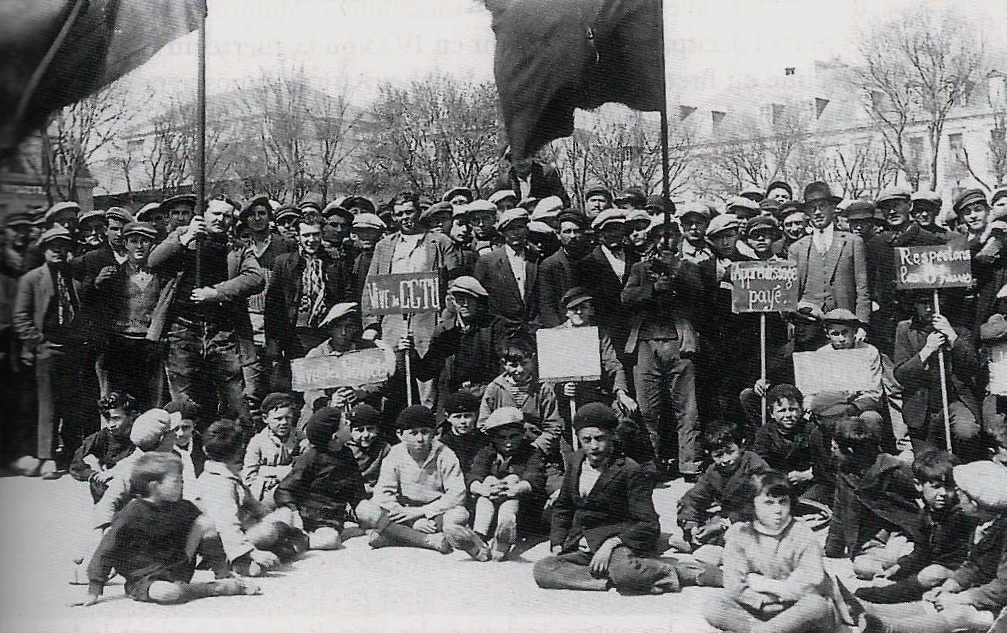
- Demonstration of CGTU construction workers, Concarneau, 1929
- Merged: General Confederation of Labour
- Founded: June 1922
- Dissolved: 1936
- Location: France
- Key people: Gaston Monmousseau

The Confédération générale du travail unitaire, or CGTU (English: United General Confederation of Labor), was a trade union confederation in France that at first included anarcho-syndicalists and soon became aligned with the French Communist Party. It was founded in 1922 as a confederation of radical unions that had left the socialist-dominated General Confederation of Labour (CGT), and in 1936 merged back into the CGT.

== Foundation ==
The CGTU emerged from a split in the General Confederation of Labour (CGT: Confédération générale du travail), which had been torn by confrontations between socialist members of the French Section of the Workers' International (SFIO: Section Française de l'Internationale Ouvrière) and the more radical anarcho-syndicalists and members of the French Communist Party (PCF: Parti communiste français). The CGTU took the majority of the CGT with it. Initially the syndicalists and anarchists outnumbered the communists.

Joseph Tommasi, a member of the PCF executive committee, attended the congress in Saint-Étienne on 25 June – 1 July 1922 at which the syndicates, unions and federations that had been excluded from the CGT founded the CGTU. The dynamic new organization was attached to peace and to the anti-imperialist and anti-colonialist struggle. As a member of the anarcho-syndicalist minority of the CGT, Gaston Monmousseau became General Secretary of the CGTU, a position he held until 1933.

== History ==
Over the first two or three years many of the syndicalists joined the communist movement, including leaders such as Alfred Rosmer and Pierre Monatte. Later the syndicalists became disillusioned with the control exerted by Moscow over the party, and the Trotskyite purges. Marie Guillot founded a new "unitary" confederation of teachers, with its first confederal Congress held at Saint-Étienne in June 1922. Marie Guillot took an intermediate position in the continuum of revolutionary syndicalism, while recognizing the merits of the Soviet Revolution. Guillot was appointed to the confederal Bureau of the CGTU after the withdrawal of her colleague Louis Bouët. This was the first time a woman was part of the Confederation Office, according to the L'Humanité.

In November 1922 Monmousseau represented the CGTU at the second congress of the Red International of Trade Unions (Profintern) in Moscow. Pierre Semard, a leader in the PCF, played an important role in the debate between Communists and Anarcho-Syndicalists over the role of the CGTU at its Bourges Congress in September 1923. Semard proposed a motion, passed by a great majority, that the CGTU would commit itself to a tireless struggle for the defense of workers. This was a victory for the Communist faction. In 1923 CGTU became a Profintern affiliate. The communist fully controlled the CGTU after 1924. They introduced changes to the original constitution. Union officials were now eligible for reelection, votes were proportion to the number of union members represented. Efforts, generally unsuccessful, were made to replace local organizations by regional ones, with officials loyal to the party rather than to their local base.

Lucie Colliard was a deputy member of the PCF's 24-member steering committee (CD: Comité Directeur) from 1922 to 1924. She was a member of the female secretariat of the CGTU from 1923 to 1925. In 1926, some of the CGTU members left to create the Confédération Générale du Travail-Syndicaliste Révolutionnaire (CGT-SR). Some syndicalists stayed with the CGTU and others returned to the CGT. Marie Mayoux and her husband François Mayoux, leaders of the teachers' union, were expelled from the PCF at the party congress held in Paris on 16–19 October 1922 as "unrepentant sydicalists". In 1929 they were also expelled from the CGTU.

The CGTU membership steadily declined in comparison to the CGT due to internal disagreements, ineffective strikes and troubles within the Communist Party. During the Popular Front period the CGTU merged back into CGT. Monmousseau participated in founding the reunified CGT in 1936.

== Sources ==
- "Colliard (1877-1961)". La Bataille socialiste (in French). 5 September 2007.
- Dreyfus, Michel (1995). Histoire de la C. G. T.: Cent ans de syndicalisme en France. Editions Complexe. ISBN 978-2-87027-574-0.
- Lazitch, Branko (1986). Biographical Dictionary of the Comintern. Stanford: The Hoover Institution Press.
- Lorwin, Val Rogin (1954). The French Labor Movement. Harvard University Press. OCLC 5507754.
- Maitron, Jean (1989). Communisme - Révolution Française. L'AGE D'HOMME. ISBN 978-2-8251-3407-8.
- Marty, André (22 August 1944). "PIERRE SEMARD". Algiers.
- "Marie et François Mayoux". Ephéméride Anarchiste (in French). Archived from the original on 22 April 2015.
- "Monmousseau, Gaston". The Great Soviet Encyclopedia, 3rd Edition (1970-1979). The Gale Group. 2010.
- Pottier, Georges-François (2013). "IL Y A 130 ANS NAISSAIT EN TOURAINE – GASTON MONMOUSSEAU (1883-1960) SYNDICALISTE, HOMME POLITIQUE ET ÉCRIVAIN" (in French). Archives départementales d'Indre-et-Loire.
- Riddell, John, ed. (14 October 2011). "Trade Unions". Toward the United Front: Proceedings of the Fourth Congress of the Communist International, 1922. BRILL. ISBN 978-90-04-20778-3.
- Saposs, D. J. Labour Movement in Post-War France (1931)
- Simon, Luis (1990). "L'Heritage Revolutionnaire de la C.G.T.". Hommage a Jaime Diaz-Rozzotto. Presses Univ. Franche-Comté. GGKEY:7AF9XRNU0JG.
