= Caroline Amblard =

French trade unionist and dramatist (1872–1939)

- Born: Caroline Vallier; 4 February 1872; Marseille, Occitania, France
- Died: 4 July 1939 (aged 67); Marseille, Occitania, France
- Occupations: Printer, actress, playwright
- Years active: 1905–1918
- Organisation: General Confederation of Labour
- Movement: Anarcho-syndicalism, antimilitarism
- Spouse: Lucien Paul Amblard
- Children: 2
- Parents: Étienne Vallier (father); Clara Marie Roman (mother)

Caroline Amblard (née Vallier; 4 February 1872 – 4 July 1939) was a French actress, playwright and anarcho-syndicalist activist.

== Biography ==
Caroline Vallier was born on 4 February 1872 in Marseille. The daughter of a day labourer, she went to work in the printing industry, became involved in trade union organizing and became an anarchist. In 1905, she was elected president of the Women Printing Workers' Union (French: Syndicat des ouvrières de l’imprimerie). She also served on the board of the Union of Workers' Trade Unions (French: Union des chambres syndicales ouvrières), the main trade union federation in Bouches-du-Rhône, until the following year, and contributed to its newspaper L'Ouvrier syndiqué. She also wrote for Gustave Cauvin's anarcho-syndicalist journal L’Ouvrier conscient. In 1906, she married Lucien Paul Amblard, with whom she had two daughters.

In 1909, she became known to the police as an activist in the Causeries anarchist group. In October 1910, her union delegated her to attend a congress of the General Confederation of Labour (CGT) in Toulouse, where she asked that her union to be admitted to the CGT as an independent organization, as the other printing workers' federations refused to admit women; the congress unanimously approved their admission. She remained active in the union over the subsequent years and again caught police attention with her advocacy of revolution at the local Labour Exchange. She became well known for leading the Marseille Social Theatre (French: Théâtre social de Marseille), within which she worked as a playwright and actress. She acted as a liaison for the Labour Exchange, which sponsored her troupe, despite allegations that she was using it for personal profit, which she denied. She wrote and performed in plays about workers' rights and antimilitarism, and on 10 March 1913, she received a fine for performing a banned play that criticised French militarism and imperialism.

The theatre troupe discontinued its activities following the outbreak of World War I. She subsequently joined the antimilitarist faction of the CGT and in 1917 led a demonstration against the rising cost of living in France during the war. In May 1918, she denounced the majority faction of the CGT for its pro-war position and advocated for a strike against the war. After the war, she remarried on 2 February 1929. She died in Marseille on 4 July 1939, and her death was announced in Le Petit Provençal the following day.

== Bibliography ==
- Olivesi, Antoine; Dupuy, Rolf (18 June 2024) [3 April 2014]. "AMBLARD Caroline [née VALLIER]". Dictionnaire des anarchistes. Le Maitron (in French). Editions de l'Atelier.
- Vidalou-Latreille, Huguette (1999). "AMBLARD Caroline née Vallier". Marseillaises Vingt-six siècles d'Histoire (in French). Edisud. pp. 38–39. ISBN 2-7449-0079-6.
