= Raymond Péricat =

French trade unionist and communist

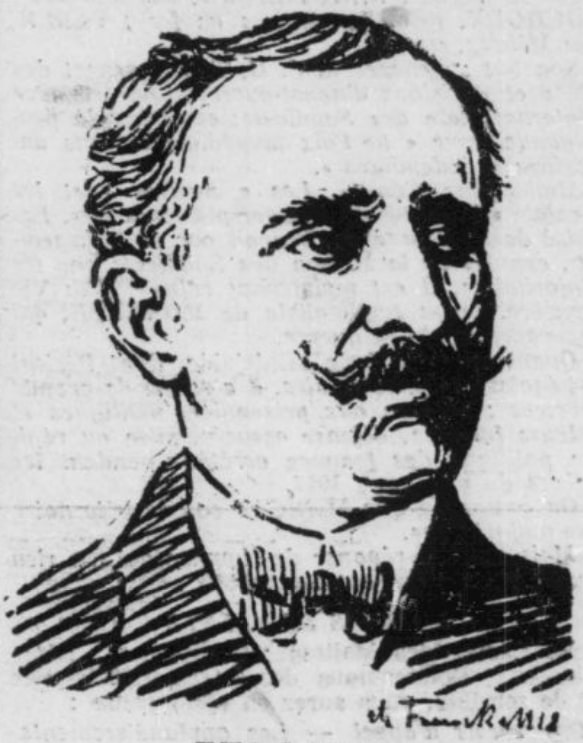
- Raymond Péricat in 1918
- Born: 23 January 1873; Gretz-Armainvilliers, Seine-et-Marne, France
- Died: 13 July 1958 (aged 85); Paris, France
- Occupation: Labor leader

Raymond Péricat (23 January 1873 – 13 July 1958) was a militant French trade unionist and communist. During World War I (1914–18) he took an internationalist and pacifist position. After the war he tried to establish a radical Communist party that blended Bolshevism with anarchist concepts.

== Early years ==
Raymond Louis Péricat was born on 23 January 1873 in Gretz-Armainvilliers, Seine-et-Marne. He entered the building trade, and soon became involved in union activities. He was secretary of the Building Federation (Fédération du Bâtiment) from 1908 to 1912. Péricat represented the Federation of Building Trades Workers at the CGT's Conférence Ordinaire des Fédérations Nationales et des Bourses du Travail held on 13–15 July 1913. This was the last general meeting of the CGT before World War I (1914–18). Péricat was in favor of fusing the national federations and bourses, while Léon Jouhaux and Alphonse Merrheim were in favor of keeping a degree of autonomy.

== World War I ==
During World War I (28 July 1914 – 11 November 1918) Péricat devoted much effort to fighting the nationalist unions that supported the war, along with Merrheim, Albert Bourderon and Fernand Loriot. On 31 July 1914 he was the only member of the National Confederal Committee of the CGT to propose to implement the decision made by its congress and launch an insurrection against the war. The International Action Committee (CAI: Comité d'action internationale) was founded in December 1915 by French syndicalists who supported the pacifist declarations of the Zimmerwald Conference. Péricat was secretary of the CAI.

In 1916 the CAI merged with the Socialist Minority Committee to form the Committee for the Resumption of International Relations (Comité pour la réprise des rélations internationales). Péricat was a member of the executive of this committee. Albert Bourderon proposed and Louise Saumoneau supported a manifesto that said the committee would function "until the party majority and the International Socialist Bureau resume international relations." In February 1917 the Committee for the Resumption of International Relations split up. Alphonse Merrheim withdrew to concentrate on union work. Pierre Brizon, Jean Raffin-Dugens and Bourderon joining the SFIO minority led by Jean Longuet. The socialists Fernand Loriot, Charles Rappoport, Louise Saumoneau and François Mayoux took control of the committee.

Péricat disagreed with the committee's direction and founded a Committee of Syndicalist Defense (Comité de défense syndicaliste) early in 1917 to campaign for a general strike and demand an immediate peace. When a series of strikes began in the spring of 1918 in the Loire Basin, centered on Saint-Étienne, Pericat and Andrée Andrieux tried to convert the strikes into a general strike against the war along the same lines as the Bolshevik actions in Russia. The strikes were suppressed and the leaders of the Committee of Syndicalist Defense were arrested. Merrheim had disagreed with the strikes, but defended Péricat and told the premier Georges Clemenceau and the Left deputies that they must listen to the proletariat and understand their grievances if France was to avoid the fate of Russia in being forced into peace on disadvantageous terms. Péricat was released in November 1918.

== Later career ==
Péricat's position after the war has been called "Ultra-Left", a blend of Bolshevism with syndicalist anarchism. He founded and became editor of the newspaper L'Internationale. In the first edition, published on 15 February 1919, he disparaged the Second International and called for a true International to be established. On 8 May 1919 the Committee for Resumption, the Committee of Syndicalist Defense and other anarchist elements decided to combine into the Committee for the Third International (Comité pour la 3^{e} Internationale.) The secretaries of the committee were Alfred Rosmer, Péricat, Loriot and Saumoneau, all Anarcho-Syndicalists. They decided not to break with the CGT, but to spread propaganda for the new International. Pericat disagreed with this approach, wanting to form a Communist Party.

Péricat accused the committee of being unrevolutionary, and even of taking a parliamentary approach. He wanted to expand the strikes that broke out in the spring of 1919 into a full-scale revolution. Péricat founded a new party, officially the Parti Communiste, Section Française de l'Internationale, which published a manifesto and by-laws at the start of June 1919. It called for a general strike to overthrow the state. The civil service and the state itself were to be abolished, replaced by a system of corporations, or soviets, administering themselves with a confederation. On 1 September 1919 Leon Trotsky chose to ignore Péricat's dispute with the mainstream French Communists and wrote a letter to Pierre Monatte, Loriot, Péricat and Alfred Rosmer in which he talked of his "bonds of friendship" with them all, and said the revolution in France would be in strong hands. In October 1919 Lenin wrote in an article that Pericat's L'Internationale and Georges Anquetil's Titre Censuré were the two Communist newspapers in Paris. He did not mention La Vie Ouvrière.

At the CGT's first post-war congress, held in Lyon on 15–21 September 1919, Monatte, Péricat, Gaston Monmousseau and Joseph Tommasi led the minority that wanted to bring the CGT into the Third International, seize power and establish a dictatorship of the proletariat. They led a committee of 26 minority unions that was formed in October 1919, later named the Comité Syndicaliste Révolutionnaire (CST). L'Internationale was forced to stop publication in September 1919. In late December 1919 Péricat's group, harassed by the government and the press, split into a Parti Communiste and a Fédération Communiste des Soviets. In 1920 the anarchist militants in these two groups became disillusioned with the Bolsheviks, and in 1921 and 1922 became extremely hostile opponents of the Communist Party.

Raymond Péricat died in Paris on 13 July 1958 at the age of 85.

== Sources ==
- Berthet, Pierre (2013-11-30). "Les libertaires français face à la révolution bolchévique en 1919 autour de Raymond Pericat et du Parti communiste". Archives Autonomies.
- "Fernand Loriot". Communist Bulletin (32–33). July 1933.
- Gankin, Olga Hess; Fisher, Harold Henry (1940-01-01). The Bolsheviks and the World War: The Origin of the Third International. Stanford University Press. ISBN 978-0-8047-0345-1.
- Gildea, Robert (1996-01-01). The Past in French History. Yale University Press. ISBN 978-0-300-06711-8.
- Hulse, James W. (1964-01-01). The Forming of the Communist International. Stanford University Press. p. 138. ISBN 978-0-8047-0176-1.
- Papayanis, N. (2012-12-06). Alphonse Merrheim: The Emergence of Reformism in Revolutionary Syndicalism, 1871 – 1925. Springer Science & Business Media. ISBN 978-94-009-5155-6.
- "PÉRICAT Raymond, Louis". Dictionnaire Biographique Mouvement Ouvrier Mouvement Social (in French). Maitron/Editions de l'Atelier.
- Wohl, Robert (1966-01-01). French Communism in the Making, 1914–1924. Stanford University Press. p. 149. ISBN 978-0-8047-0177-8.
