= Pierre Monatte =

French trade unionist

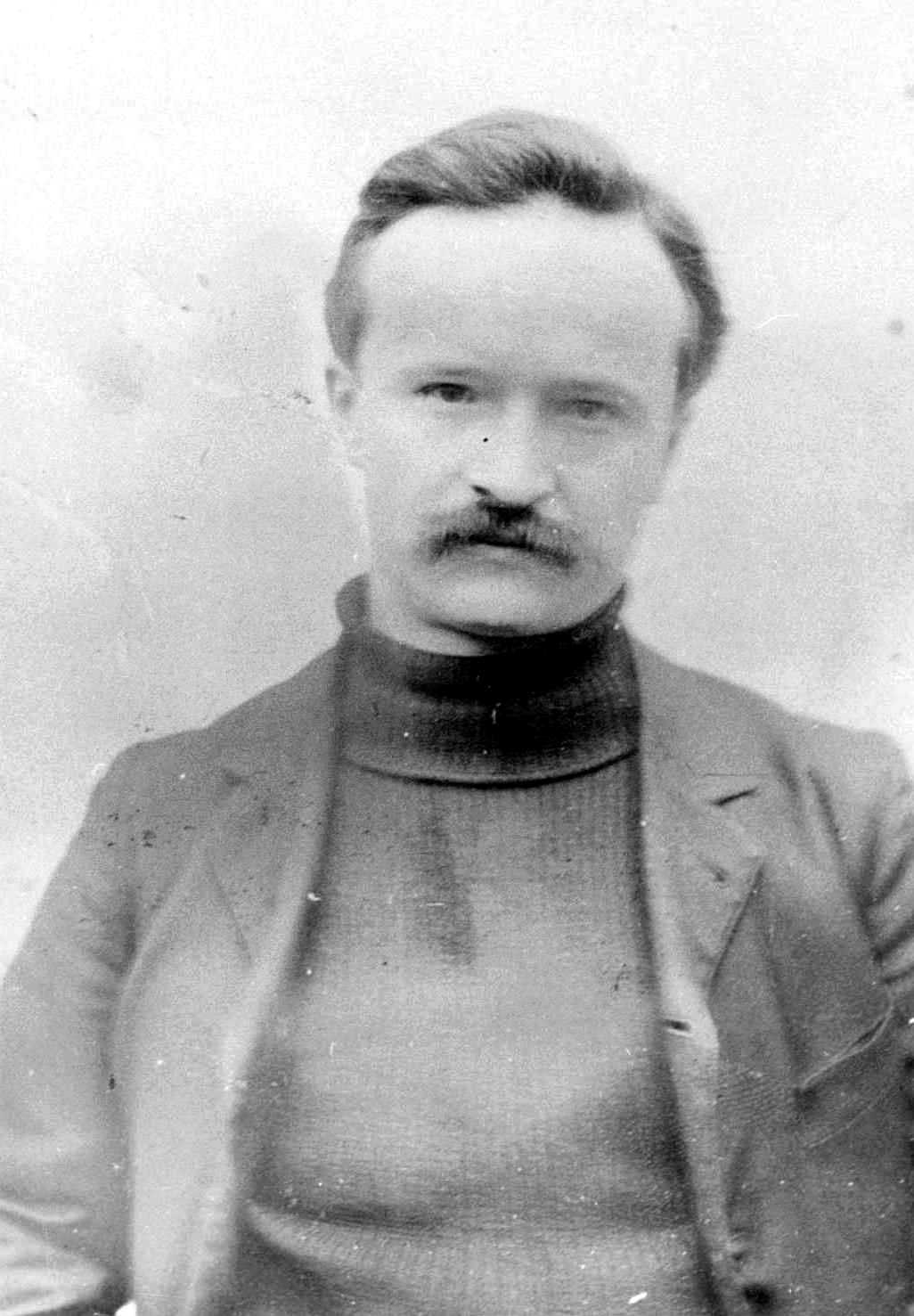
- Monatte c. 1915
- Born: 15 January 1881; Monlet, France
- Died: 27 June 1960 (aged 79); Vanves, Paris, France
- Occupation: Printer
- Known for: Trade unionism

Pierre Monatte (15 January 1881 – 27 June 1960) was a French trade unionist, a founder of the Confédération générale du travail (CGT, General Confederation of Labour) at the beginning of the 20th century, and founder of its journal La Vie Ouvrière (Workers' Life) on 5 October 1909. Monatte has been considered one of the great figures of revolutionary syndicalism.

== Life ==
Monatte was born on 15 January 1881. Alphonse Merrheim arrived in Paris in 1904, and soon afterward, he met Monatte at the office of Pages Libres. The two men would work together to launch La Vie Ouvrière (The Worker's Life).

In 1914 Monatte and Alfred Rosmer led the internationalist core of La Vie ouvrière (The Worker's Life).

Monatte often referred himself to Fernand Pelloutier and did not disguise his anarchist sympathies although he drifted away from that current of socialism after the International Anarchist Congress of Amsterdam in 1907. There, Monatte argued in particular with Errico Malatesta concerning the methods of organisation. Invoking the 1906 Charter of Amiens, which established the principle of "political neutrality" of trade unions, Monatte considered syndicalism itself to be revolutionary, but Malatesta advocated the creation of some sort of anarchist organisation to superate internal conflicts among the workers' movement itself.

Monatte was the first secretary general of the Comités syndicalistes révolutionnaires (Revolutionary Syndicalist Committees).

He was an opponent of the First World War.

At the CGT's first postwar congress, held in Lyon from 15 to 21 September 1919, Monatte was among the leaders of the minority, with Joseph Tommasi, Raymond Péricat and Gaston Monmousseau and denounced the CGT membership in the Amsterdam International of Labor Unions. They claimed that the CGT majority had broken with the principles of syndicalism and lost faith in revolution by dealing with the government. The minority wanted the CGT to join the Communist International.

In 1923, Monatte joined the French Communist Party (PCF) and was close to Boris Souvarine and Alfred Rosmer. Along with them, he was excluded at the end of 1924 of the party at the occasion of an internal purge against Left Opposition of the party, which supported Leon Trotsky. Then, Monatte founded in January 1925 the journal La Révolution prolétarienne (The Proletarian Revolution), along with Robert Louzon. The journal enjoyed an appreciated audience among trade unionists and left-wing activists during the interwar period.

== Bibliography ==
- Colette Chambelland, Pierre Monatte, Une autre voix syndicaliste, coll.: Part des Hommes, Éd. de l'Atelier, 1999, ISBN 2-7082-3460-9

== Sources ==
- "Alphonse Merrheim". Marxistes.
- Monatte, Pierre (November 1925). "Alphonse Merrheim (1871–1925)". La Révolution Prolétarienne (11).
- Wohl, Robert (1966). French Communism in the Making, 1914-1924. Stanford University Press. p. 216. ISBN 978-0-8047-0177-8.
