= La Nouvelle Vie Ouvrière =

French trade union magazine

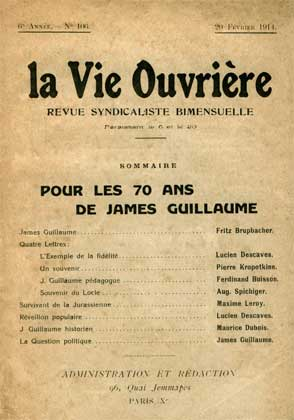
- La Vie Ouvrière 20 February 1914
- Type: Monthly magazine
- Owner: General Confederation of Labour
- Founder: Pierre Monatte
- Publisher: Nouvelle Société anonyme La Vie ouvrière
- President: Éric Aubin
- Editor-in-chief: Véronique Lopez
- General manager: Stéphane Puifourcat
- Founded: 5 October 1909
- Language: French
- Headquarters: Montreuil, Seine-Saint-Denis
- ISSN: 1628-674X
- Website: nvo.fr

La Nouvelle Vie Ouvrière (French pronunciation: [la nuvɛl vi uvʁijɛʁ];The New Worker's Life) ou NVO is a French trade union magazine first published in 1909 under the name La Vie Ouvrière. It is the main newspaper of the General Confederation of Labour.

== History ==
=== 1909-1914 ===
Alphonse Merrheim, a revolutionary syndicalist, arrived in Paris in 1904, and soon after met Pierre Monatte at the office of Pages Libres. The two men would later work together to launch La Vie Ouvrière. The first number appeared on 5 October 1909.

The notice on the front page signed by Pierre Monatte proclaimed that it would be devoted to action, which would provide assistance to militants in the battle of propaganda. The paper was to be a practical instrument, without making any ideological concessions. 110 issues of the bi-monthly journal were published up to July 1914.

Financial transparency was an important goal, with the journal committed to reporting its finances to its subscribers on a regular basis. Monatte did not have any money to invest in the journal, but was able to obtain subscriptions and donations sufficient to rent an office, pay the staff of three (Monatte as editor in chief, a copy editor and an administrator) and pay the printer.

Finance was a constant worry, but growth in subscribers was strong. There were 800 after six months, and from 1,600 to 1,800 afterwards. The journal became financially secure when subscriptions rose to 3,000. These were mostly labor militants from all the federations, but included 10% teachers and 15% "curious".

Collecting copy was an easier task. A team was quickly assembled with specialists such as Dr. La Fontaine for medicine, Robert Louzon on engineering and Francis Delaisi on economics. The socialist and feminist Louise Bodin contributed to the journal. Articles covered national and international syndicalist news, social and political questions and strikes. In 1912 government repression was a major theme.

The question of workers' housing was scarcely discussed. The writers avoided flaunting their intellectual knowledge, but tried to explain complex issues to the activists. Monatte also attached much importance to typographical elegance, the choice of titles and illustrations, and giving a modern and airy layout. Four days a week a meeting was held from 9–11 p.m. where contributors could come to talk, bring an article, and also help with shipping and administration. The work was done very much on a collective basis.

The journal covered a wide range of social issues and international problems. It provides much insight into the views of the revolutionary syndicalists by whom and for whom the journal was created. The writers were highly aware of the needs of the modern proletariat. The journal closed at the outbreak of World War I (1914–18), a symbolic decision agreed by all. Its influence is hard to measure, but in its day it was known to most militants in France and abroad.

== Sources ==
- Chambelland, Colette (1987). "La Vie ouvrière (1909-1914)". Cahiers Georges Sorel (in French). 5: 89–93. doi:10.3406/mcm.1987.946.
- Colson, Daniel (1986). Anarcho-syndicalisme et communisme: Saint-Etienne 1920-1925 (in French). Université de Saint-Etienne. ISBN 978-2-85145-052-4.
- Groux, Guy; Lévy, Catherine (1993). La possession ouvrière: du taudis à la propriété, XIXe-XXe siècle (in French). Editions de l'Atelier. ISBN 978-2-7082-3019-4.
- "La Vie Ouvrière". Seasonal Anarchist (in French).
- Monatte, Pierre (November 1925). "Alphonse Merrheim (1871–1925)". La Révolution Prolétarienne (in French) (11). Archived from the original on 2014-01-11.
- Schiappa, Jean-Marc (1989). "COSNIER Colette, La bolchevique aux bijoux". Communisme - Révolution Française (in French). L'AGE D'HOMME. ISBN 978-2-8251-3407-8.
