= Marceline =

Marceline or Marcelline may refer to:

== People with the given name ==
- Marceline Desbordes-Valmore (1786–1859), French poet
- Marceline Orbes (1874–1927), Spanish clown
- Marcelline Jayakody (1902–1998), Sri Lankan Catholic priest, musician, and journalist
- Marceline Day (1908–2000), American actress whose career began as a child in the 1910s
- Marceline Hecquet (?-1950), French feminist, anarchist and pacifist
- Marceline Miéville (1921–2014), Swiss dentist and a feminist politician
- Marceline Loridan-Ivens (1928–2018), French writer and film director, Auschwitz survivor
- Marcelline Picard-Kanapé (born 1941), Innu teacher and chief
- Marceline Hugot (born 1960), American actress

=== Characters ===
- Marceline, character from the play The Marriage of Figaro by Pierre Beaumarchais
- Marceline the Vampire Queen, a character in the animated series Adventure Time

== Places ==
- Marceline, Pasadena, California, neighborhood
- Marcelline, Illinois
- Marceline, Missouri
- Sainte-Marcelline-de-Kildare, Quebec
- Villa Sainte-Marcelline, private French school in Westmount, Quebec

== Others ==
- Marceline (fabric)
- 1730 Marceline, a main-belt asteroid
- Jason and Marceline, a 1986 young adult novel by Jerry Spinelli
