= Marceline Hecquet =

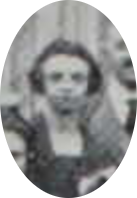
- Occupations: Writer, Pacifist
- Known for: Literary works, Pacifist activism

Marceline Hecquet (?-1950) was a French feminist, anarchist and pacifist known for her activism for peace and conscientious objection after the First World War. She believed in the power of a pacifist, socialist and educational stance and argued during the interwar period that the main way to end war was through women education.

== Life ==
Marceline Hecquet was born in France, but the exact details of her birth and early life are unknown.

In the aftermath of the First World War, pacifism gained considerable traction as people sought to prevent the recurrence of such catastrophic conflicts. After the devastation of the First World War, she became deeply disillusioned with the destructive nature of war and dedicated herself to the cause of peace. Hecquet actively participated in peace rallies, conferences and other events to promote peace and disarmament. She worked with other pacifists and organisations to raise awareness of the consequences of war and to promote peaceful solutions.

In the 1920s, she published articles in magazines such as "Vouloir", "La Révolution Prolétarienne", "Le Populaire", "Le Libre Penseur de France" and "La Mère Educatrice".

During WWI, Marceline Hecquet followed her husband J. Taupin, who had refused his military obligations on moral grounds to Belgium, where she wrote in 2024 the first comprehensive French-language study of conscientious objection. Hecquet also advocated conscientious objection as a political or moral tool of resistance to war during the interwar period in her book entitled "L'Objection de conscience devant le service militaire".

In 1924, Madeleine Vernet, Éliane Larivière, Fanny Clar and Marceline Hecquet co-signed an "Open Letter to the Governments" ("Lettre ouverte aux gouvernements") calling for a complete and general amnesty, a rapid evacuation of the Ruhr and the re-establishment of political and commercial relations with Germany. Written in the context of the 1924 French legislative election and the triumph of the Cartel des Gauches, the open letter testifies to the authors' disappointment with the new government's approach to the Ruhr Question.

== Works ==
Marceline Hecquet's works include:

- Hecquet, Marceline (June 1924). "L'Objection de conscience devant le service militaire" (PDF). La Brochure Mensuele (in French). Paris: Editions du Groupe de propagande par la brochure.
- Hecquet, Marceline (1923). "Nous… qui avons laissé faire" [We... who let it happen]. La Mère Educatrice (in French). 6: 81–82.
- Marceline Hecquet and Martha Steinitz, 'Kriegsdienstverweigerung wahrend des Weltkrieges,' in Franz Kobler, ed., Gewalt und Gewaltlosigkeit: Handbuch des aktiven Pazifismus (Zurich and Leipzig 1928), 259.
- Marceline Hecquet, "De la non-coopération," Journal du peuple, n°179 (29 June 1922)
