= Fanny Clar =

French journalist and writer

Clara Fanny Olivier
- Born: February 17, 1875; 4th arrondissement of Paris, France
- Died: February 24, 1944 (aged 69)
- Occupations: journalist; writer
- Spouse: Émile Célié
- Partner: Raphaël Diligent
- Children: Jean Célié
- Relatives: François Clar (grandson)
- Writing career
- Pen name: Fanny Clar
- Language: French
- Genres: novels; poetry; plays; children's literature

Clara Fanny Olivier (February 17, 1875, 4th arrondissement of Paris – February 24, 1944), known by her pen name Fanny Clar, was a French journalist and writer, as well as a socialist intellectual (as defined by the French Section of the Workers' International (SFIO). She is also remembered for her commitment to pacifism and feminism. While her literary work includes novels, poems and plays, Clar primarily wrote stories for children.

== Early life ==
Clara Fanny Olivier was born in Paris, February 17, 1875. She was the daughter of two opticians living on Avenue Victoria.

== Career ==
In 1904, Clar contributed to Le Libertaire as "Francine". There she met Miguel Almereyda, the father of Jean Vigo, with whom she maintained contact. She participated in the Ligue Internationale pour l’Éducation Rationnelle de l’enfance (International League for the Rational Education of Childhood), founded by Francisco Ferrer in 1908.

Beginning on August 21, 1912, and every week thereafter, in the antimilitarist newspaper La Guerre sociale she wrote a column for women titled "Notre coin" (Our corner). In November 1913, she worked with Miguel Almereyda at the newspaper Le Bonnet rouge. Her sentimental serial novel, La Rose de Jéricho (The Rose of Jericho) appeared in L'Humanité from October 6, 1916.

In the interwar period, she collaborated with her son, Jean Célié, writing a number of articles for French socialist newspapers, including Le Travail de Seine-et-Marne, Floréal, Le Populaire, and Le Peuple.

Clar wrote articles for the feminist newspaper La Voix des femmes (founded in 1917 by Colette Reynaud and Louise Bodin) when it was relaunched in October 1919. In 1920, she was accused of defeatism and demoralization by Louis Marchand (Note: Associate professor of German, officer interpreter.) in his book L'offensive morale des Allemands, en France, pendant la guerre for her writings of 1915 (1 June 1915, 2 June 1915, 10 June 1915, 13 August 1915, 8 December 1915, and others). In 1924, Madeleine Vernet, Éliane Larivière, Fanny Clar and Marceline Hecquet co-signed an "Open Letter to the Governments" ("Lettre ouverte aux gouvernements") calling for a complete and general amnesty, a rapid evacuation of the Ruhr and the re-establishment of political and commercial relations with Germany.

In addition to numerous articles in various newspapers and magazines, Clar wrote novels, poems and plays. She was admitted to the Société des gens de lettres in 1924. In 1932, her articles appeared in Le Soir (arts section), L’Ère nouvelle (women’s section), Le Peuple de Bruxelles, Vu, and L’Âge heureux.

Jean Vigo hired Clar for the role of Juliette's mother (uncredited) in the film L'Atalante in 1934, and she went on to promote the movie.

== Personal life ==
Clar married Émile Célié. They had a son, Jean (born February 21, 1897), and lived at 70 rue des Batignolles. She later lived with the sculptor and painter Raphaël Diligent (1884-1964) who illustrated several of her books.

Fanny Clar died on February 24, 1944.

Her grandson, François Clar (1931-2011), was a painter.

== Selected works ==
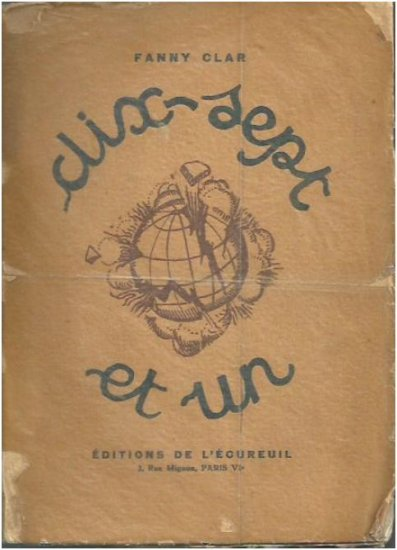
Dix-sept et un, 1938

- Céline petite bourgeoise, 1919.
- Les Jacques, 1926.
- Les trois souhaits de Babette, Éditions de la jeunesse. Monthly publications. January 1928, no. 4, editor l'École émancipée.
- La Ronde de la maison, current reading book for the preparatory course (1st year), for infant classes and nursery schools, Éditions Montaigne, 1928.
- Vitivit et sa nichée: histoire d'une famille de pinsons with Lucien Descaves, Éditions de la Rose Rouge, 1931.
- La Colombe blessée, 1932.
- L'enfant sans larmes, Éditions Administration 39-41, Passage Choiseul, 1932.
- L'Appel de l'homme de l'usine, du chantier, manifeste with Cresson, Diligent, and Flament, 1932.
- Sans rimes... non sans raisons, Éditions de la Rose rouge, 1935. (booklet of poems)
- L'île aux épouvantails, Éditions E.S.I., 24, rue Racine, 1935.
- Nous allons jouer, Children's Theater dedicated to adults. Drawing by R. Diligent, impr. Joe. Vermault, 1935.
- Dix-sept et un, illustrations by Diligent, 1938.
- Le jardin des mille soucis, 1939 (poems).
- Les Mains enchantées, illustrations by Diligent and Jean Clar, Éditions de l'Ecureuil, 1924, 1939,1946, 1959.
- La Maison des sept compagnons avec Albert Bernet, 1947.

== Sources ==
- Birnbaum, Paula J., Women Artists in Interwar France: Framing Femininities, Farnham, Ashgate Press, 2011.
- Cooper, Clarissa Burnham, Women poets of the twentieth century in France, King's Crown Press, 1943.
- Embs, Jean-Marie; Mellot, Philippe; Carcopino, Jean-Jérôme (photographer), Le siècle d'or du livre d'enfants et de jeunesse: 1840-1940, Paris, éditions de l'Amateur, 2000. (in French)
- Gomes, P. E. S., Jean Vigo, Paris, Seuil, 1957 (édition consultée : Ramsay, 1988). (in French)
- Icher, François, Les compagnonnages en France au XXe siècle : histoire, mémoire, représentations, éditions Grancher, 1999. (in French)
- Legendre, Tony, Expériences de vie communautaire anarchiste en France : La Clairière de Vaux, Aisne, 1902-1907 et la colonie naturiste et végétalienne de Bascon, Aisne, 1911-1951, Saint-Georges-d'Oléron, Les éditions libertaires, 2006. (in French)
- MacLeod, Catriona; Plesch, Véronique; Schoell-Glass, Charlotte, Elective Affinities : Testing Word and Image Relationships, Amsterdam, Rodopi, 2009.
- Bianco, René, 100 ans de presse anarchiste : notice. (in French)
