= Marcheline =

Marcheline is a female given name. It is a feminine form of Marcellin, a derivative of the Latin Marcellinus.

Marcheline can refer to:

- Marcheline Bertrand, actress and mother of Angelina Jolie
- Brangelina (Vivienne Marcheline Jolie-Pitt)
- Susane Marcheline Rachelle "Creepy Susie" Garnier, a character from the TV series The Oblongs - see Creepy Susie and 13 Other Tragic Tales for Troubled Children

== See also ==
- Marceline
