= Hans Adam =

Hans Adam or Hans-Adam may refer to:

- Hans-Adam I, Prince of Liechtenstein (1657–1712), 3rd Prince of Liechtenstein
- Hans-Adam II, Prince of Liechtenstein (born 1945), reigning 15th Prince of Liechtenstein

== See also ==
- Hans Ritter von Adam (1886–1917), German World War I flying ace
- Hans Adam Dorten (1880–1963), German lawyer and Rhenish separatist
- Hans Adam von Schöning (1641–1696), Generalfeldmarschall in Brandenburg-Prussia and Electorate of Saxony
- Hans Adam Weissenkircher (1646–1695), Austrian painter
