= Franz Josef Heinz =

Separatist German leader (1884–1924)

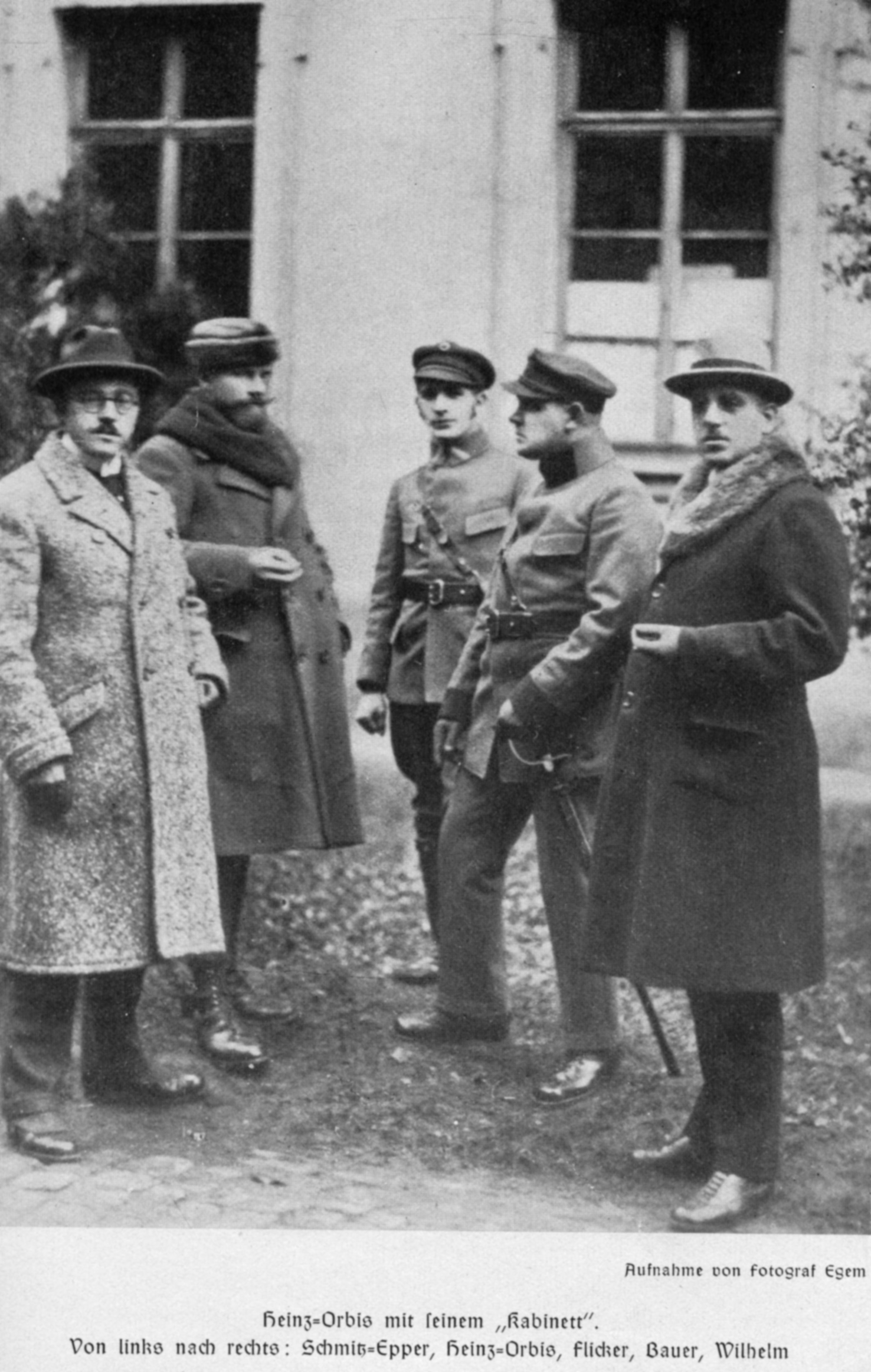
Franz Josef Heinz (second from left) and members of his cabinet, 1923

Franz Josef Heinz, known as Heinz-Orbis, (25 February 1884 - 9 January 1924) was a Palatine separatist who briefly led the government of the "Autonomous Palatinate" during the French occupation of the Rhineland. He was assassinated by German nationalists in 1924.

Heinz came from the town of Orbis in Northern Palatinate, later using the town as part of his name. He was a farmer and became a leader of the free peasantry and the founder of the Palatine Corps. In the aftermath of World War I, France occupied the Rhineland. Along with some other members of the liberal German People's Party (DVP), Heinz saw this as an opportunity to reject the Prussian militarist state. In 1920 he became a member of the Palatine district council, arguing for greater autonomy in the area.

By 1923 a separatist movement for a Rhenish Republic in the occupied Rhineland territory had developed, encouraged by the French. In August 1923 a republic was proclaimed under Josef Friedrich Matthes of the Rhenish Independence League. In November, Heinz proclaimed the "Government of the Autonomous Palatinate in the Association of the Rhenish Republic", based in Speyer. The aim was to create an independent state, adjoining France. The new government adopted a currency based on the French franc, which it promised would deal with the problem of the current hyperinflation in the Weimar Republic.

With the approval of the Bavarian government, a detachment of the Viking League, enemies of the separatists, under the command of Edgar Julius Jung planned to assassinate Heinz. After part of his farm in Orbis was set on fire, Heinz predicted that an attempt would be made to murder him. On 9 January 1924 Jung's troop of around twenty nationalists forced their way into the dining room of the Speyer Wittelsbacher Hof hotel and shot Heinz dead. In the shoot-out, one of his staff and another hotel guest were also killed, along with two assassins. The deaths signalled the end of the independence movement. Clashes between nationalists and separatists followed, leading to a number of other deaths, notably in Pirmasens where 12 separatists trapped in a building were burned out and then massacred.

A monument was later put up in the Speyer cemetery to the two murderers, Franz Hellinger and Ferdinand Wiesmann, who died in the shootout with Heinz's supporters after the assassination. Hellinger and Wiesmann were both members of the Nazi Party. In 1934, Edgar Julius Jung was himself murdered during the Night of the Long Knives.

The maintaining of the monument and annual wreath laying at the site continued until 2001, when a book was published about the assassination.
