= Palatinate (region) =

Historical region of Germany

Coordinates: 49°26′N 7°46′E

The Palatinate Rhenish Palatinate Die Pfalz
- Historical region
- Flag Coat of arms

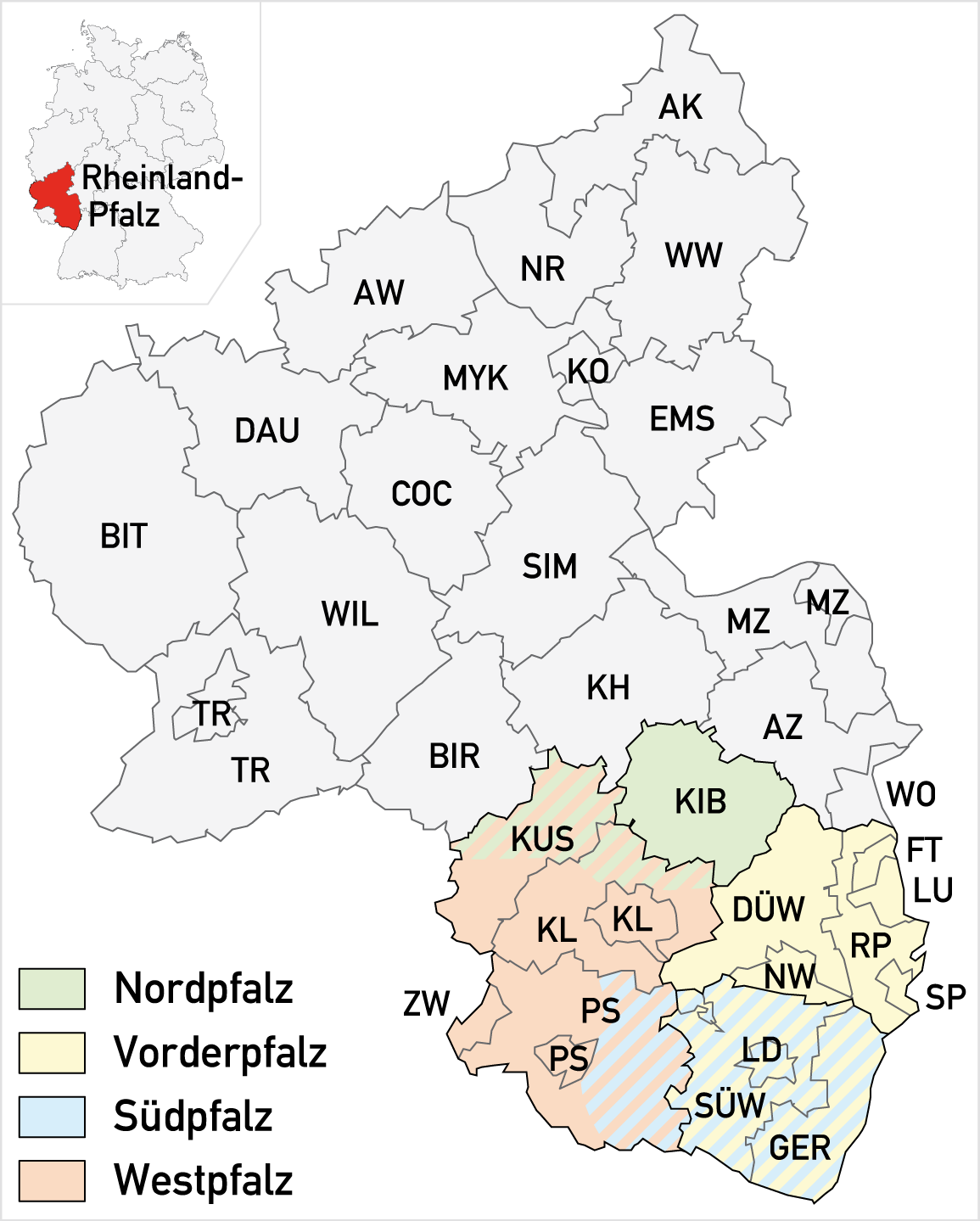
- Map of the modern State of Rhineland-Palatinate with the Palatinate region highlighted and further subdivided into its sub-regions: North Palatinate (green), Anterior Palatinate (yellow), South Palatinate (blue) and West Palatinate (red)

Population
  - Total: 1,400,000
- Demonyms: Palatine; Pfälzer

The Palatinate (/pəˈlætɪnɪt/; German: Pfalz [pfalts]; Palatine German: Palz), or the Rhenish Palatinate (Rheinpfalz), is a historical region of Germany. The Palatinate occupies most of the southern quarter of the German state of Rhineland-Palatinate (Rheinland-Pfalz), covering an area of 5,450 km^{2} (2,100 mi^{2}) with about 1.4 million inhabitants. Its residents are known as Palatines (Pfälzer).

== Geography ==
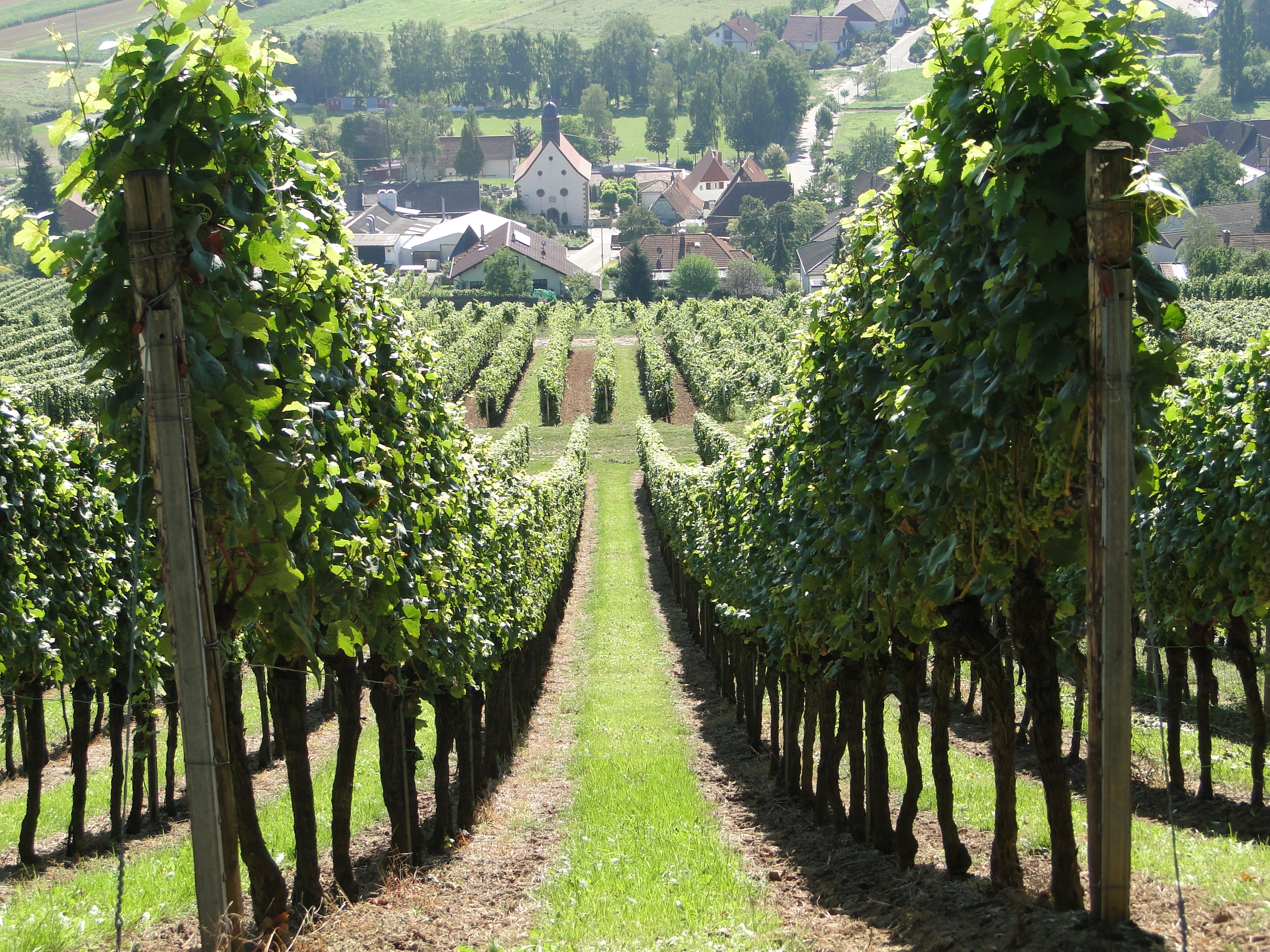
Vineyards near the German Wine Route

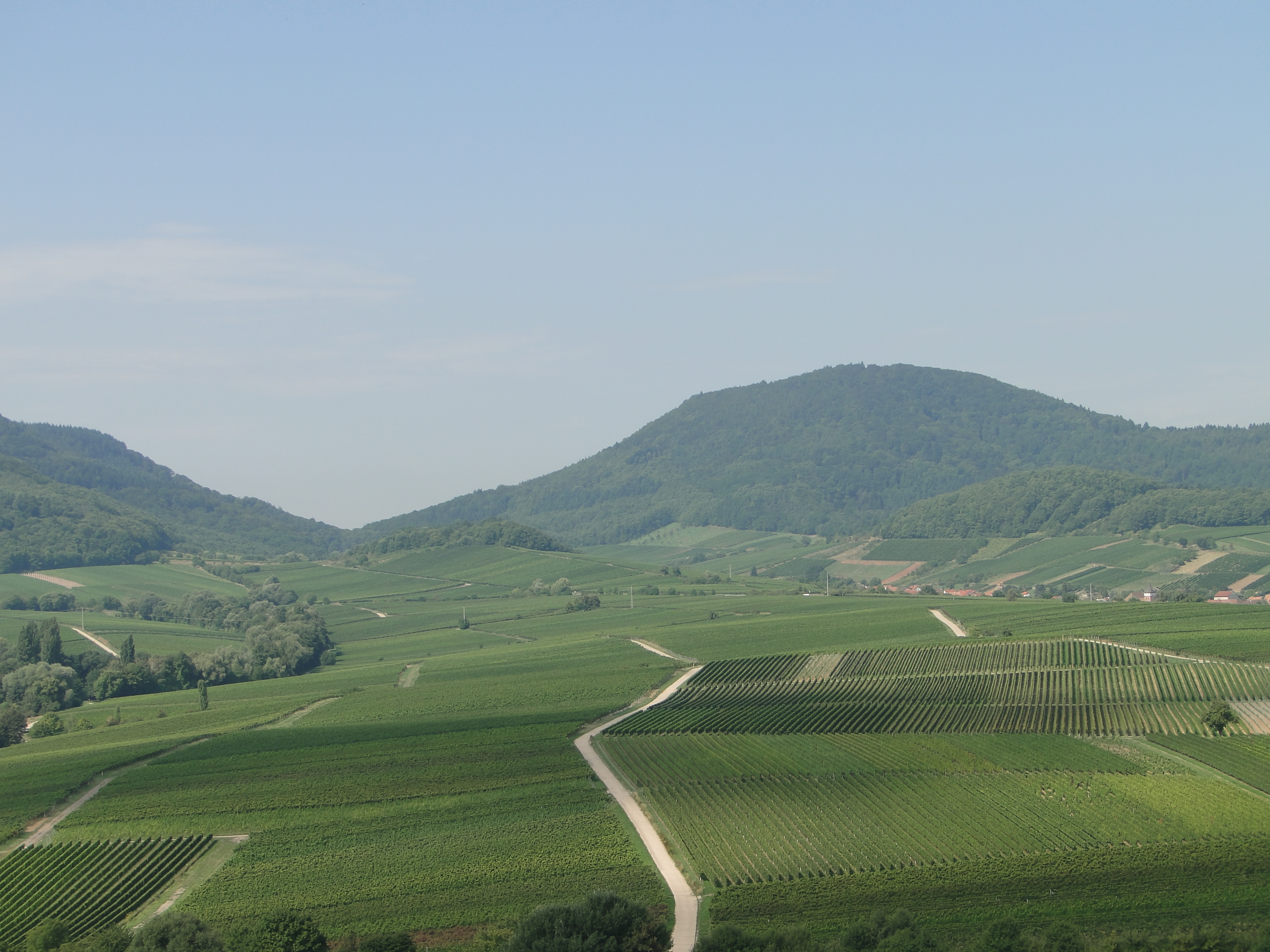
A typical vineyard landscape in the Palatinate Forest

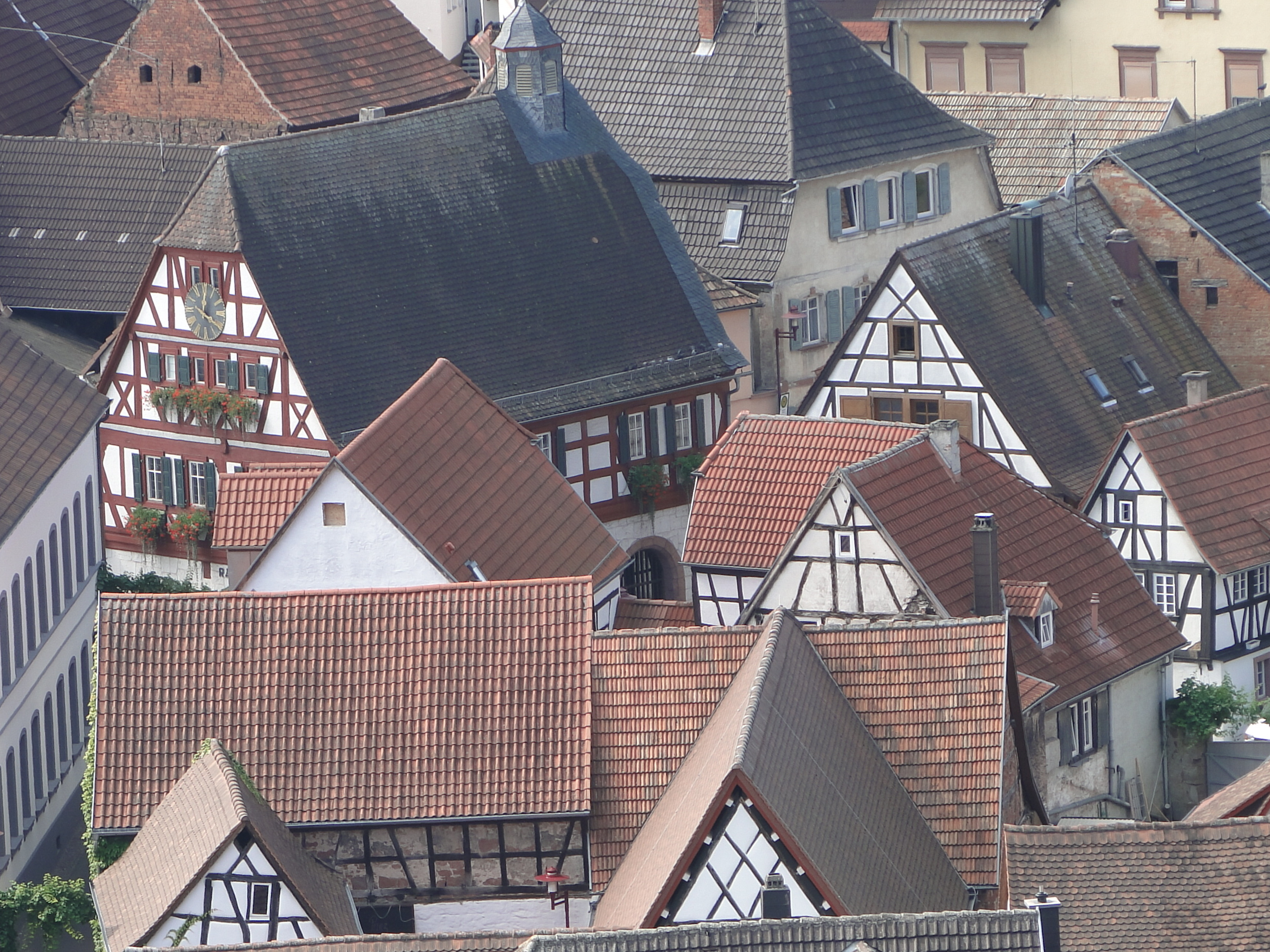
Medieval frame houses in Ilbesheim, a village in South Palatinate

The Palatinate borders Saarland in the west, historically also comprising the state's Saarpfalz District. In the northwest, the Hunsrück mountain range forms the border with the Rhineland region. The eastern border with Hesse and the Baden region runs along the Upper Rhine river, while the left bank, with Mainz and Worms as well as the Selz basin around Alzey, belong to the Rhenish Hesse region. In the south, the German-French border separates the Palatinate from Alsace.

One-third of the region is covered by the Palatinate Forest (Pfälzerwald), including the Palatinate Forest Nature Park popular with hikers. With about 1771 km2, it is Germany's largest contiguous forested area, and is part of the binational Palatinate Forest-North Vosges Biosphere Reserve.

The western and northern part of the Palatinate is a densely forested and mountainous area. Its highest mountain is the Donnersberg with a height of 687 meters, situated in the North Palatine Uplands near Kirchheimbolanden. Most of the major Palatinate towns (Ludwigshafen, Speyer, Landau, Frankenthal, Neustadt) lie in the lower eastern part of the Upper Rhine Plain down to the Rhine. Here the German Wine Route (Deutsche Weinstraße) passes through the Palatinate wine region.

Major rivers include the Upper Rhine tributaries Lauter, Queich and Speyerbach, as well as Schwarzbach and Glan in the west.

Historically the Electoral Palatinate and several other territories were part of the Palatinate, but today belong to other German territories.

=== Subdivision ===
The Palatinate is divided into four non-administrative sub-regions, comprising the following rural districts and independent towns and cities:

- North Palatinate (Nordpfalz), i.e. the sparsely inhabited North Palatine Uplands, made up of
  - Donnersbergkreis (KIB), including the small towns of Eisenberg, Kirchheimbolanden and Rockenhausen
- Anterior Palatinate (Vorderpfalz) between Upper Rhine and the Haardt range of the Palatinate Forest
  - Bad Dürkheim (DÜW)
  - Rhein-Pfalz-Kreis (RP)
  - and the towns and cities of Frankenthal (FT), Ludwigshafen (LU), Neustadt an der Weinstraße (NW) and Speyer (SP)
- South Palatinate (Südpfalz).
  - Germersheim (GER)
  - Südliche Weinstraße (SÜW)
  - and the town of Landau (LD)
- West Palatinate (Westpfalz) up to the western part of the North Palatine Uplands
  - Kaiserslautern (district) (KL)
  - Kusel (KUS)
  - Südwestpfalz (PS)
  - and the towns of Kaiserslautern (KL), Pirmasens (PS) and Zweibrücken (ZW).

=== Climate ===
Like most of Southwestern Germany, the Palatinate's climate is either humid subtropical in areas below 300 meters or oceanic on higher ground. The average annual temperatures vary from around 11-14° Celsius in the valleys and 8-10° in the highlands. Wet air from the prevailing westerly and southwesterly winds leads to precipitation in the Mittelgebirge ranges, while it warms up on its way further down to the Rhine Valley, giving the valleys a considerably drier climate than the surrounding Palatine Forest.

== History ==
During the Holy Roman Empire prior to World War II, it was also referred to as Rhenish Bavaria and Lower Palatinate (Unterpfalz), which designated only the western part of the Electorate of the Palatinate (Kurfürstentum Pfalz), as opposed to the Upper Palatinate (Oberpfalz).

Formerly a Celtic region, this area was conquered by the Roman Empire under Emperor Augustus in about 12 BC; thereafter, it was part of the province of Germania Superior. During the decline of the Empire, Alamannic tribes settled here; their territory was conquered by Francia under King Clovis I about 496. From 511 onwards, the area belonged to the eastern part of Frankish Austrasia, which—as Rhenish Franconia—became part of East Francia according to the 843 Treaty of Verdun.

=== Holy Roman Empire ===
The Palatine Lion

From the Middle Ages until 1792, the Palatinate was divided into 45 secular and ecclesiastical territories, some of which were very small. The largest and most important of these was the Electorate of the Palatinate (Kurfürstentum Pfalz), encompassing a number of Franconian territories on both sides of the Rhine formerly held by the Counts palatine (Pfalzgrafen) of Lotharingia. By the late 12th century, the Count palatine had achieved the status of a Prince-elector (Kurfürst), becoming one of the seven higher nobles with the privilege of electing the Emperor, as confirmed by the Golden Bull of 1356. In 1214, the Bavarian House of Wittelsbach was enfeoffed with these estates, which they ruled until 1918, together with the collateral branch of Palatine Zweibrücken from 1410. Needing stronger protection, they lost control with the reunification with Bavaria under Elector Charles Theodore in 1777.

The major ecclesiastical territory in the region was the Bishopric of Speyer. The Imperial city of Landau joined the Alsatian Décapole in 1521 to preserve its status. Nevertheless, it was seized by France after the Thirty Years' War.

Other larger regional entities included the Duchy of Zweibrücken and the Prince-Bishopric of Speyer. The Prince-Bishopric held possessions on both sides of the Rhine. For centuries, the Electoral Palatinate and Bavaria maintained dynastic links because both were ruled by members of the Wittelsbach family.

=== French rule ===
In 1794, the Left Bank of the Rhine, including the Palatinate, was occupied by French revolutionary troops. As a result of the Treaty of Campo Formio (1797), the French First Republic annexed the region. In 1798, the French introduced a new administrative system with the establishment of departments. The area of the Palatinate largely became the Département of Mont Tonnerre, laying the cornerstone of its regional identity today. Minor parts of today's region were attached to the neighbouring departments of the Sarre and Bas-Rhin. The French further subdivided the department into cantons, mayoralties and municipalities, and introduced their legal system (Napoleonic Code) and the metric system.

=== Bavarian rule ===
The Rhenish Palatinate when it was unified as part of the Kingdom of Bavaria into the German Empire, 1871

Following the defeat of Napoleon at the Battle of Leipzig in 1813 and the capture of the Left Bank of the Rhine by the Allies in January 1814, the region was, from February 2, 1814, initially under the provisional authority of the General Government of the Middle Rhine. However, from June 16 of the same year, it was placed under the administration of the Imperial-Royal ("k.k.") Austrian and Royal Bavarian Joint Land Administration Commission (k.k. österreichischen und k. bairischen gemeinschaftliche Landes-Administrations-Kommission).

In the main treaty agreed at the Congress of Vienna in 1815, and dated June 9, 1815, Article 51 stated (inter alia) that on the Left Bank of the Rhine the former French départements of the Sarre and Mont-Tonnerre, except where set forth in the same treaty, were to fall "with full sovereignty" and ownership rights within the overlordship of His Majesty the Emperor of Austria (Herrschaft Sr. Maj. des Kaisers von Oesterreich). Initially, however, joint Austro-Bavarian administration was retained.

On April 14, 1816, a treaty was signed between Austria and Bavaria in which the various territorial changes were agreed on. According to Article 2 of the treaty, Emperor Francis I of Austria ceded various regions to King Maximilian I of Bavaria. These included, in addition to various regions east of the Rhine, the following regions west of the Rhine:

In the Département of Mont-Tonnerre (Donnersberg):
1. the districts of Zweibrücken, Kaiserslautern, and Speier; the latter with the exception of the cantons of Worms and Pfeddersheim;
2. the canton of Kirchheim-Bolanden, in the district of Alzei.
In the Département of the Sarre:
3. the cantons of Waldmohr, Blieskastel, and Kusel, the latter with the exception of several villages on the road from Sankt Wendel to Baumholder, for which there was to be compensation, by another territorial transfer, with the agreement of the assembled plenipotentiaries of the allied powers at Frankfurt.
In the Département of the Bas Rhin:
4. the canton, town, and fortress of Landau, the latter as a federal fortress in accordance with the regulations of November 3, 1815;
5. the cantons of Bergzabern, Langenkandel, and the whole part of the Département of Bas Rhin on the left bank of the Lauter, which had been ceded in the Paris Tractat of November 20, 1815.

These changes took effect on May 1, 1816.

In accordance with the prevailing Bavarian administrative structure, the region became one of eight Bavarian districts (Kreise). From 1808, Bavaria embarked on the administrative reorganization of its territory, creating districts which, as in France, were named after the main local rivers. Thus, the new district along the Rhine was given the name Rheinkreis (i.e. the Rhine district), with Speyer as its capital. Of the former French administrative structure, the subdivision of the district into arrondissements, cantons, mayoralties, and municipalities was, in large measure, retained. The Bavarian government also preserved the French legal system (Code Napoléon), giving the Palatinate a distinct legal status within the Bavarian kingdom.

At the next lower level, the three former French arrondissements were continued as Kreisdirektion ("Circle", i.e. district, "direction") of Frankenthal, Kaiserslautern, and Zweibrücken. Kreisdirektion Landau was, however, a new creation. In 1818, the cantons were merged into 12 administrative districts called Landkommissariat. In 1862, these were designated individually as Bezirksamt. In 1939, each one became a Landkreis (rural district). As his first provincial governor, King Maximilian selected the Privy Councillor (Hofrat) Franz Xaver von Zwack, whose name gave rise to the popular Palatine nickname for Bavarians, Zwockel. In 1832 the Rheinkreis became the focal point of liberal movements. The Hambach Festival, a large gathering near Neustadt an der Weinstraße, proved fertile ground for what came to be considered a milestone in German history.

In 1835, King Ludwig I of Bavaria's romantic outlook gave rise to the adoption of new, historically evocative names for the administrative districts of Bavaria. As such, the Rheinkreis officially became the Pfalz (Palatinate). The historic Electorate of the Palatinate had spanned both sides of the Rhine with Heidelberg and Mannheim as its capitals on the eastern side, whereas the new "Palatinate" established in 1815–1816 lay solely on the left bank of the Rhine. It included territories that had never been part of the historical Palatinate (e.g., territories of the former Bishopric of Speyer, the imperial city of Speyer or Kirchheimbolanden, which had formerly belonged to the Weilburg branch of Nassau). To avoid confusion of the new Palatinate and the former one (and with the Upper Palatinate), the name Rhenish Palatinate (Rheinpfalz) became common and is still used today, but was never made its official name. Another term, that of Rhenish Bavaria (Rheinbayern), though used occasionally, never gained great currency, but can, nonetheless, be found sometimes on older maps.

The Bavarian Royal Family tried to encourage Palatine unity with Bavaria by erecting a royal palace in Edenkoben, and by restoring Speyer Cathedral under the direct supervision of King Ludwig I. The new town of Ludwigshafen was named after the king. Despite these attempts, the Palatinate's representatives to the Bavarian Parliament always prided themselves on the claim that they came from a more progressive region. Indeed, they tried to promote their liberalism, which the French had introduced to the Palatinate, to the whole Bavarian kingdom. German historian Heiner Haan described the special status accorded the Palatinate within Bavaria as being one of a Hauptstaat (main state, i.e. Bavaria) with a Nebenstaat (adjacent state, i.e. the Palatinate).

In May/June 1849, after the failed revolution of 1848, and as part of the Imperial Constitution campaign, separatist elements wanted the district to secede from Bavaria and establish its own "Palatine Republic". A separatist uprising was suppressed by Prussian military intervention. The Palatinate's union with Bavaria persisted after it became part of the German Empire in 1871, and, indeed, after the Wittelsbach dynasty was deposed, and Bavaria became a free state of the Weimar Republic in 1918.

In 1910, the town of Landau was declared independent of the Bezirksamt.

=== French occupation ===
After World War I, French troops occupied the Palatinate under the terms of the Treaty of Versailles. In 1920, the western Bezirksämter of Sankt Ingbert and Homburg (Saarpfalz) were separated from the Bavarian Palatinate, and became part of the newly established Saar basin territory, which, according to the peace treaty, was governed by the League of Nations. That same year, seven more towns were declared independent of the Bezirksämter: Speyer, Ludwigshafen, Frankenthal, Neustadt an der Weinstraße, Kaiserslautern, Pirmasens, and Zweibrücken. They remain separate to this day.

Between 1919 and 1923, during the occupation, there were French-backed attempts at separating the Palatinate from Bavaria and the Empire. On June 1, 1919, Eberhard Haaß, founder of the "Free Palatine Association" (1918), proclaimed the "Palatine Republic", but failed to occupy the government building in Speyer.

In 1923, Franz Josef Heinz proclaimed the "Government of the Autonomous Palatinate in the Association of the Rhenish Republic" at Speyer, after gaining control of the towns of Kaiserslautern, Neustadt, and Landau, and after the capitulation of the Palatine government. In the following days, several more towns fell into his group's hands. The Bavarian government reacted sharply. It organized a squad under the command of Edgar Julius Jung. On January 9, 1924, Heinz was assassinated while dining at the Wittelsbacher Hof in Speyer. Other leading members of the separatist movement were killed on February 12, in a shooting in Pirmasens. By then, a treaty between Bavaria and the Inter-Allied Rhineland High Commission (the supreme council of the Allied occupation forces) of January 1924 recognized the status quo and guaranteed that the Palatinate would remain a part of Bavaria, thereby putting an end to separatist attempts.

Under Nazi rule, from 1933 to 1945, the Palatinate officially remained part of Bavaria, but was otherwise totally reorganized—it was merged with the Saarland into the Gau Westmark, with headquarters in Saarbrücken.

=== Rhineland-Palatinate ===
The union with Bavaria was finally dissolved following the reorganization of German states during the Allied occupation of Germany after World War II. While Bavaria itself was part of the U.S. occupation zone, the Palatinate was occupied by French forces. The French reorganized their occupation zone by founding new states, so that in 1947 the Palatinate was combined with Rhenish Hesse (Rheinhessen), the former parts of the People's State of Hesse west of the Rhine, and the southern part of the Prussian Rhine Province, to form the German federal state of Rhineland-Palatinate. The Palatinate formed the administrative district (Regierungsbezirk) of the Pfalz. This reorganization came with smaller losses of former district territory to the Saarland, especially in the area of Sankt Wendel. As part of the 1969 administrative reform, some minor border changes were made in the north. The Diocese of Speyer and the Evangelical Church of the Palatinate still exist today largely based on the historic boundaries of the old Bavarian district.

The Pfalz was initially one of five districts in Rhineland-Palatinate; however, in 1968, the district was merged with the neighboring district of Rheinhessen to form the district of Rheinhessen-Pfalz. On January 1, 2000, all administrative districts (Regierungsbezirke) of Rheinland-Pfalz were dissolved.

== Pennsylvania Dutch ==
Pennsylvania Dutch areas of the United States

Many Pennsylvania Dutchmen are descendants of Palatine immigrants. The Pennsylvania Dutch language, spoken by the Amish, Mennonites, and Fancy Dutch in the United States, is derived primarily from the Palatine German language which many Mennonite refugees brought to Pennsylvania in the years 1717 to 1732. The only existing Pennsylvania German newspaper, Hiwwe wie Driwwe, was founded 1996 in the village of Ober-Olm, close to Mainz, the state capital, and is published bi-annually as a cooperation project with Kutztown University. In the same village one can find the headquarters of the German-Pennsylvanian Association.

Many more Palatines emigrated in the course of the 19th century, and the great majority of them to North America, so that in the US temporarily "Palatine" was a common designation for German Americans. Johann Heinrich Heinz (1811–1891), the father of Henry John Heinz who founded the H. J. Heinz Company in Pittsburgh, Pennsylvania, emigrated from Kallstadt, Palatinate, to the United States in 1840.

== Cuisine ==
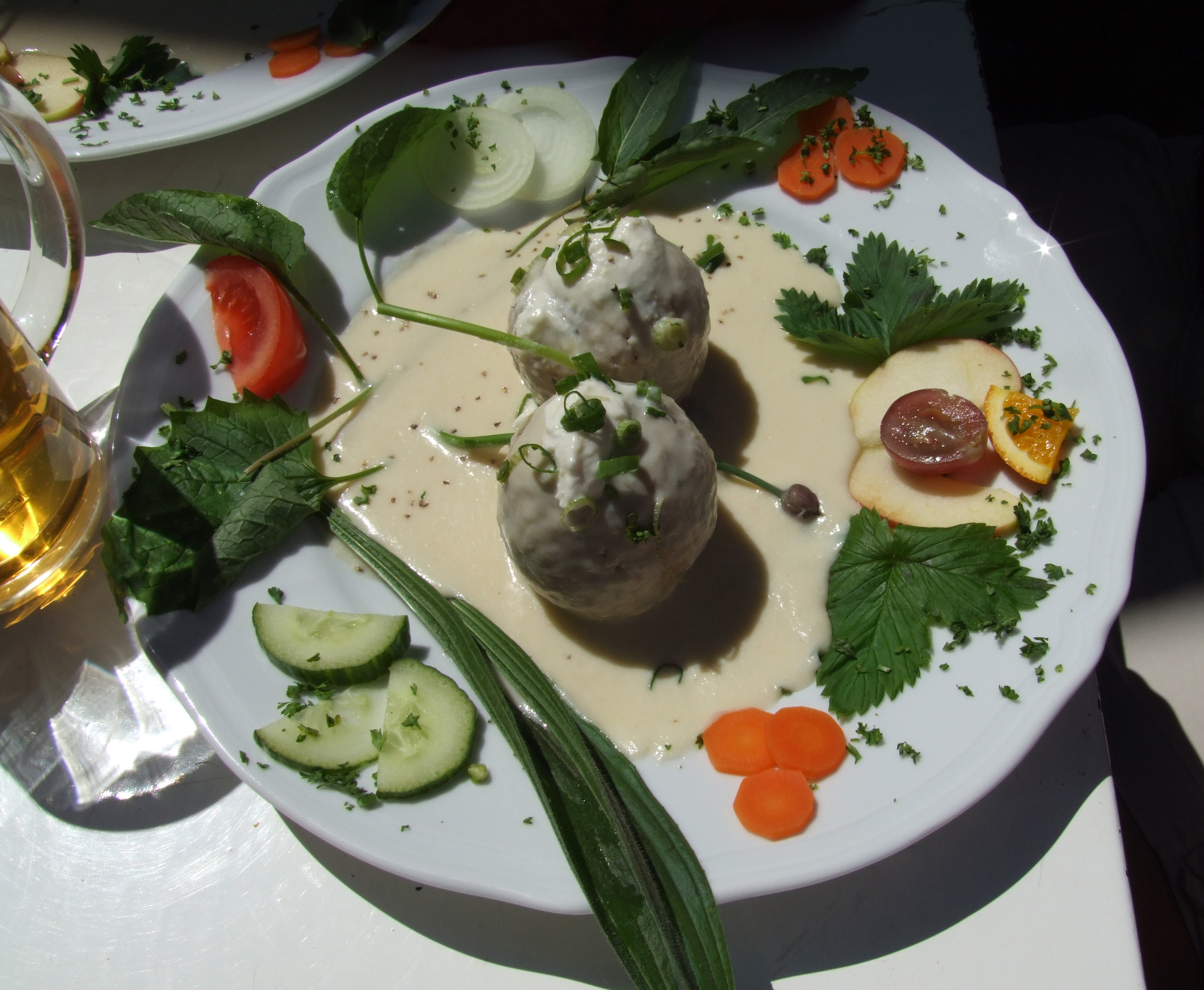
Fleeschknepp (meat dumplings) with horseradish sauce

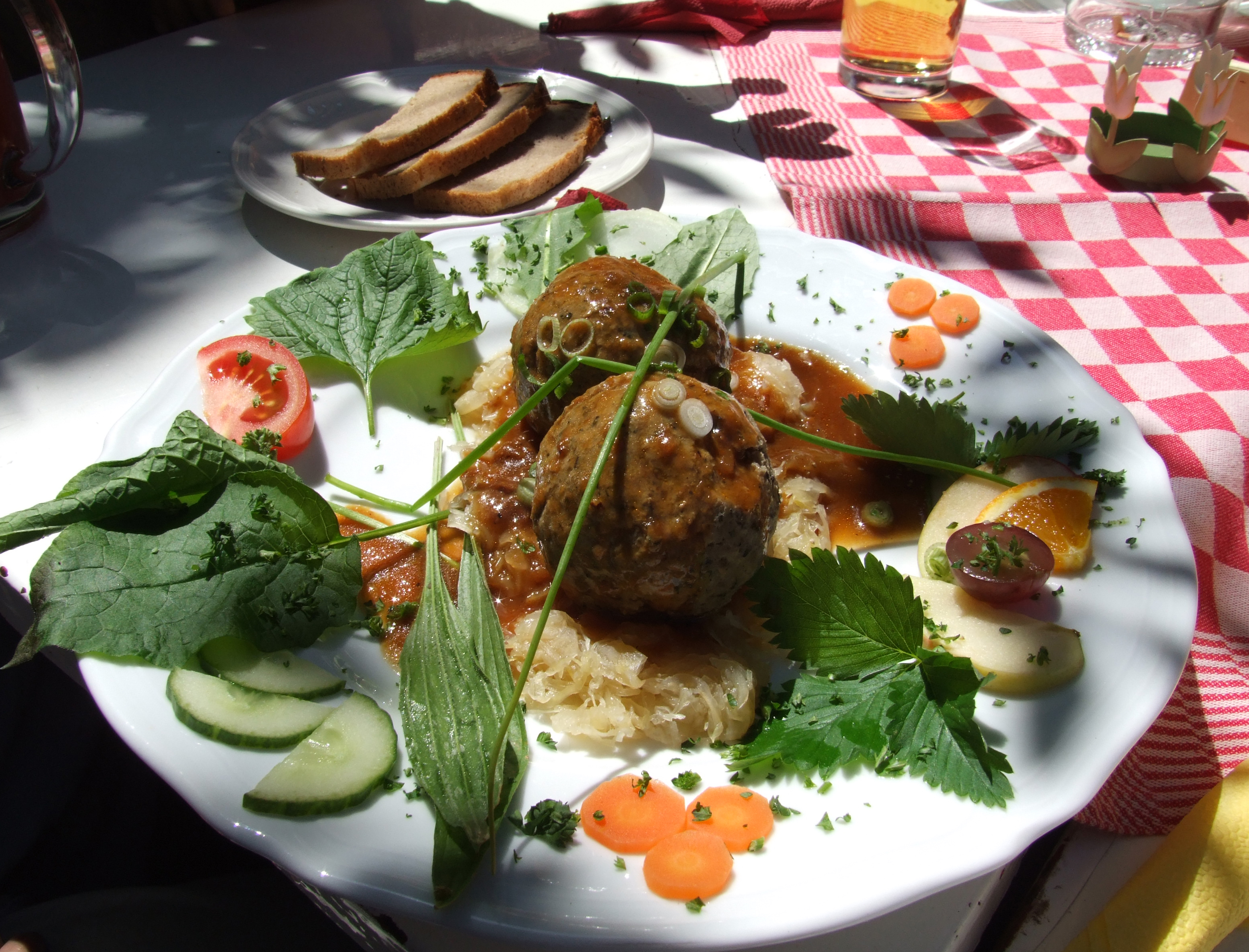
Lewwerknepp (liver dumplings) with sauerkraut and garnishes

Arguably the most famous dish in Palatinate is the saumagen, literally "sow's stomach", a dish that consists of a thick, crispy-fried casing (sow stomach) stuffed with a mixture of pork, potatoes, and seasonings. Other traditional meat dishes of the region include bratwurst, Palatinate liverwurst, a blood pudding sausage called grieweworscht ("griewe" are speck (bacon) cubes, so lit. "sausage with bacon bits"), lewwerknedel (Leberknödel) (or lewwerknepp, liver dumplings), and fleeschknepp (Fleischknödel: meat dumplings). Sauerkraut is the typical side dish in all seasons, but especially in winter, as are mashed potatoes and brown gravy. Also eaten are dampfnudels, which can be served with either sweet sauces or side dishes (such as wine, vanilla sauce, or canned fruit such as plums, prunes, or pears) or with savory side dishes (such as potato soup, vegetable soup, goulash, or pepper pork).
