= Hans Adam Dorten =

Post-WWI German separatist leader

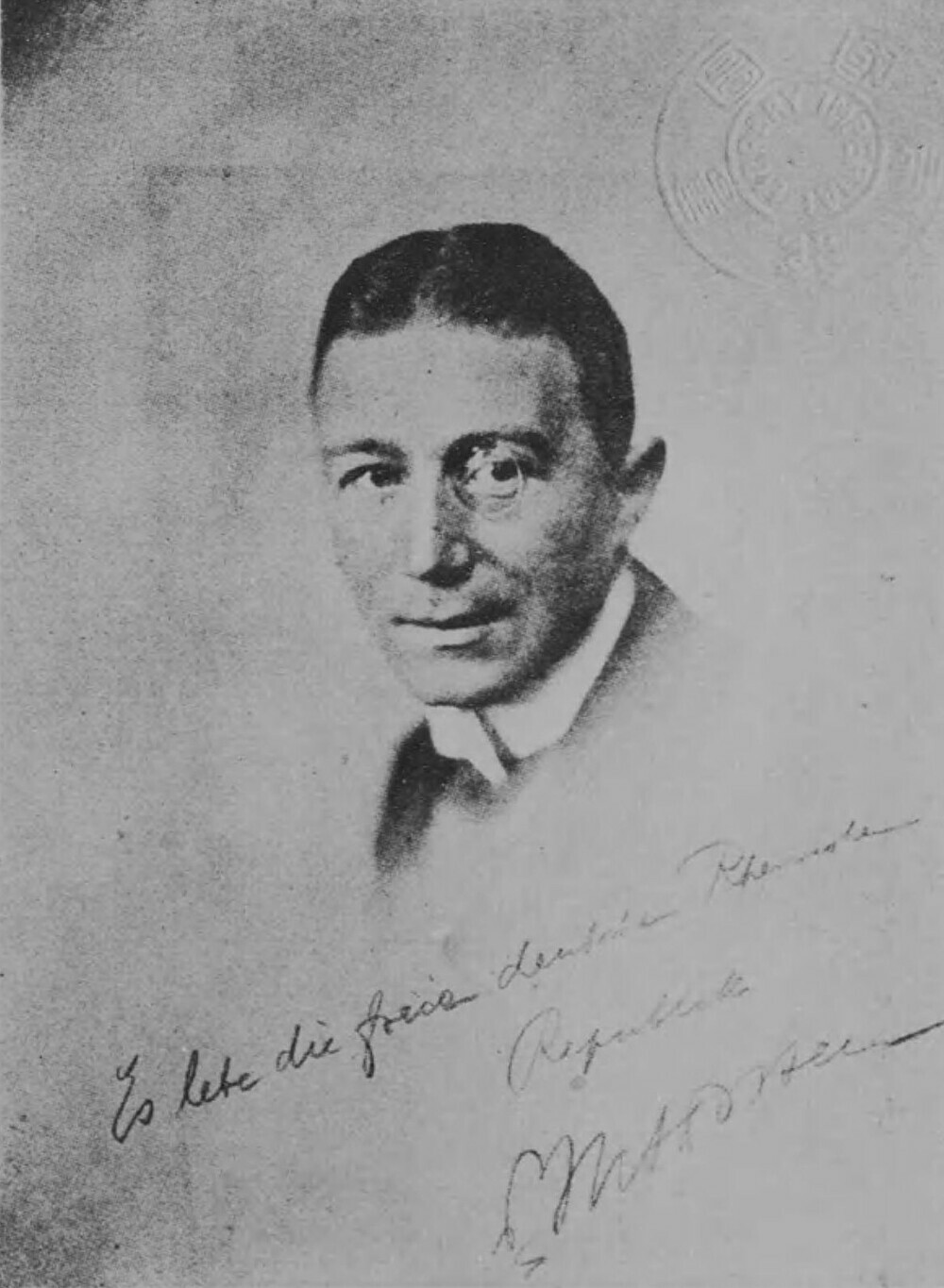
- Dorten
- Born: 10 February 1880; Endenich (Bonn), Rhine Province, Germany
- Died: April 1963; Nice, France
- Occupations: Lawyer; Politician; Rhenish separatist

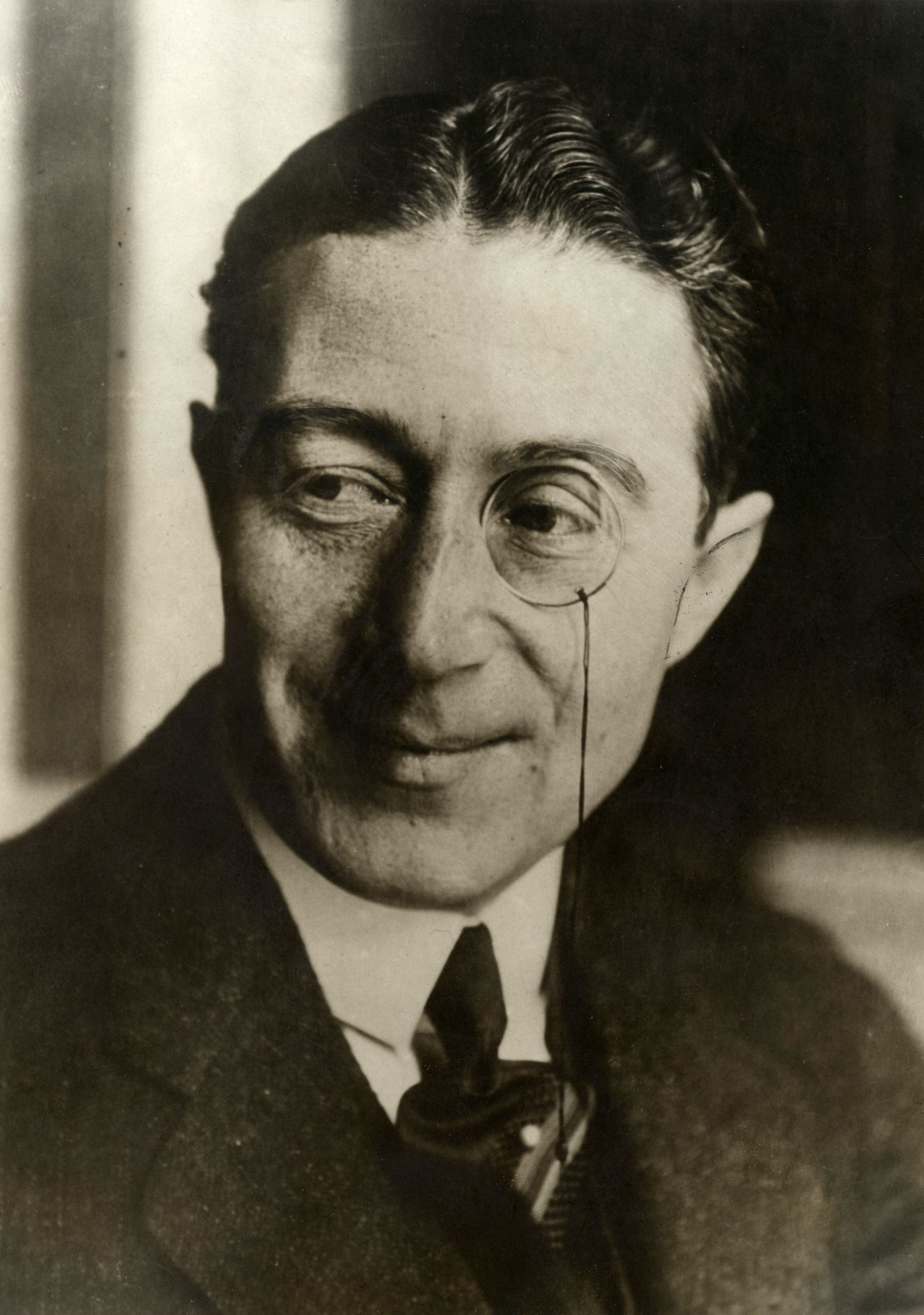
Hans Adam Dorten (1928)

Hans Adam Dorten (10 February 1880 – April 1963) was a German career lawyer who in 1919 became a separatist leader in the militarily occupied Rhineland, following German defeat in the First World War.

The period was a confused one during which political objectives were not always firmly fixed, nor clearly set out, but it is understood that Dorten's preference was for a Rhineland separated from "protestant" Prussia, and economically more closely aligned with France. At the end of 1923, a final attempt to establish an independent Rhenish state having failed, he escaped to Nice in France: here he resumed his legal career and worked on his memoirs.

== Life ==
=== Early years ===
Hans Adam Dorten was born in Endenich and attended primary and secondary schools in nearby Bonn. His father was the wealthy owner of a porcelain manufacturing company. On leaving school, he went on to study Law at Heidelberg University, the Ludwig-Maximilians-Universität München, and the University of Bonn, also receiving a Doctorate in Law in 1907 from Leipzig University. He had already, in August 1902, taken his "Civil Service Oath", and he also worked for a period at the District Prosecutor's Office in Düsseldorf. He then took a job at the district court in Waldbröl where, in 1912, he was appointed a junior judge.

The early progression of his legal career was also broken by a period of military service, undertaken with the Second Field Artillery Regiment No.23, based in Koblenz.

Ellis Island records disclose that on 22 December 1912, Dorten disembarked from the (recently refurbished and renamed) transatlantic cruise liner "Victoria Luise" on a visit to the United States, accompanied by his wife. He was recorded as a "non-immigrant", intending to visit Cleveland and San Francisco.

=== First World War ===
Dorten was appointed State prosecutor in Berlin's District Court Number 3 with effect from 1 October 1914. Before he could take up his new appointment, however, war intervened: the opening of August 1914 found Germany scrambling to react to the Austrian declaration, on 28 July, of war against Serbia. Dorten's future career path was changed on 3 August 1914 when he was conscripted into the army.

During the war he served in the 54th "Commando" Corps, ending up as a junior officer (Hauptmann). He was honoured with the Iron Cross Medal, Class I and then Class II.

In 1918, he was put under military arrest for "violent criticism" of the Kaiser. The end of the war allowed him to avoid a court-martial.

On 2 December 1918 he was released from the army, and until July 1919 he spent his accumulated months of leave entitlement.

=== A switch to politics in the aftermath of war ===
Early in 1919, the Dortens relocated to Wiesbaden. With the abdication of the Kaiser, Hans Adam turned his attention to politics during the socially and politically turbulent months that ensued. His agenda was anti-Socialist and pro-Rhineland. He financed his activities with his accumulated personal assets. He had married a very rich wife. Dorten's political purposes were not always clear-cut to contemporaries, but in retrospect many historians believe that his defining political objective was a Rhenish Republic, to operate at least initially as a part of the emerging German state. Despite extensive contacts with local political committees and with leading Rhineland politicians from the political centre such as Konrad Adenauer, Dorten was unable to gain a position of leadership in the separatist movement, however. That was partly because of his own uncompromising rejection of any sort of accommodation with the (moderately left-wing residual majority) Social Democratic Party, and partly because he was calling for an economic rapprochement with France.

Dorten continued to convene meetings of properly authorized officials and representatives in the Rhineland to try and obtain legitimacy and agreement from the towns and rural districts for the support of his objectives. His efforts met with some limited success in the southern part of the Rhineland. Not withstanding several setbacks, Dorten was able to find politically like-minded allies, including Dr. Franz Geueke, the publisher of the Rheinische Volkszeitung, the regional newspaper. It subsequently transpired that also on various occasions during 1919, he held talks at his home at Hilda Street 14 in Wiesbaden with officers from the French army of occupation, including General Mangin himself. The French made no secret of their enthusiasm the idea of peeling the Rhineland off from the rest of Germany, and they encouraged Dorten to create an independent Rhenish Republic, which from their point of view could become part of a larger solution to the "German problem". But rumours that Dorten might be "negotiating" with the French occupiers were costly in terms of support among the Rhinelanders. French military occupation and the massive economic burden blamed on reparations being paid to the French were causing real economic hardship, and a campaign of passive resistance ensued. Dorten openly opposed the passive resistance which he said was self-defeating, wrecking the economy and further impoverishing Rhinelanders. His pragmatic judgements regarding the economic interests of his region completely failed to capture the popular mood, however. Dorten's regional nationalist objectives, as far as the matter can be judged from available sources, involved separating the Rhineland from the "Prussian state" which was widely blamed for the disaster of the war, but his goals always stopped short of complete independence for the Rhineland from the rest of the German state, for which he envisaged a more federal structure than was, at that time, on offer.

=== Proclamation of the Rhenish Republic in Wiesbaden ===
The Rhenish Republic was proclaimed in Wiesbaden on 1 June 1919, with Hans Adam Dorten as its "president". After a week, it was impossible to deny that the "Putsch" had failed, in the face of large-scale popular protests, and opposition from all the municipal councils and other relevant organisations in the region. Dorten had expected backing from the French occupation forces, but they took a position of strict neutrality. The founders of the Rhenish Republic were unable to pursue their project in the face of combined opposition from the people and the municipalities.

A warrant was issued by the Leipzig based Supreme Court for Dorten's arrest, on a charge of treason; but the warrant could not be executed in the Rhineland due to the occupation.

=== Separatist agitation after the failed "Putsch" ===
Dorten did not give up. 26 August 1923 found him in Mönchengladbach, attempting to address a rally. The separatists were attacked by "nationalists loyal to the Berlin government", and Dorten had to pretend to be an American journalist in order to escape the mob.

There was another attempt to establish a Rhenish Republic in October 1923, and Dorten again played a leading role. Together with Josef Matthes he set up a "provisional government of the Rhenish Republic" in Koblenz. Following differences, the next month he proclaimed a government for the southern part of the Rhineland in Bad Ems. This insurrection also failed because widespread popular opposition, and because of a falling off in support from the French military authorities.

=== French exile ===
Following his latest failure to establish a Rhenish Republic, on the night of 31 December 1923 to 1 January 1924, Hans Adam Dorten made his way to France, settling at Nice in the south-east of the country. In 1927, he resumed work as a lawyer, and in 1928 he took French citizenship.

His memoirs were finished in 1937 under the title "La Tragédie Rhénane". The volume was published only in 1945, to be followed by a German language translation in 1979.
