= Marceline Miéville =

Swiss politician (1921–2014)

- Born: Marceline Cordone; 26 October 1921; Lausanne, Vaud, Switzerland
- Died: 8 August 2014 (aged 92); Lausanne, Vaud, Switzerland
- Occupations: dentist politician feminist activist
- Political party: POP
- Spouse: Jean Miéville
- Children: 2
- Parent(s): Raphaël Cordone; Berthe Collet

Marceline Miéville (born Marceline Cordone: 26 October 1921 – 8 August 2014) was a Swiss dentist and a feminist politician. She was a member of the left-wing Parti ouvrier et populaire (as the Swiss "Labour party" is known in parts of the French speaking region of the country).

In 1959 Marceline Miéville became the first woman in Switzerland to be accepted (initially) as a candidate in a federal (national) election. Her candidature was rejected subsequently, however. Her own canton of Vaud became the first canton, in February 1959, to endorse votes for women in cantonal and national elections, but across the country the 1959 referendum had rejected female emancipation for national elections by a margin of 2:1 of those (men) who voted.

== Biography ==
Marceline Cordone was born in Lausanne. The family was not registered to pay Church tax. Raphaël Cordone, her father, was a secondary school teacher.

When she had grown up she married an architect called Jean Miéville, and is accordingly identified as Marceline Miéville in contemporary sources concerning much of her political career. After the marriage ended in divorce, however, she reverted to her former name, Marceline Cordone. She trained as a dentist, receiving her degree in 1946.

She was, by the standards of the time and place, a militant feminist. She was also politically active more widely, taking a particular interest in third world issues and abortion rights. She engaged actively in the "Swiss women's federation for peace and progress" ("Fédération des femmes suisses pour la paix et le progrès") and was a member of the Popular Workers' Party ("Parti ouvrier et populaire" / POP). In 1969 she joined the "Revolutionary Marxist League" ("Ligue marxiste révolutionnaire"). Marceline Cordone also took her politics to her professional life as a dentist. In a country where dentistry was and is widely perceived as an exceptionally lucrative profession, an affectionate obituary published after she died recalled that "people fallen on hard times knew where to find [dental] care that they would be able to pay for, perhaps, when their fortunes improved".

By 1959 women had been entitled to vote in most of western Europe for more than a generation. Unusually for a Swiss domestic political issue, her candidacy for membership of the national parliament and its subsequent rejection on grounds of gender became a news story across and beyond Europe. She was interviewed at her home in Lausanne by an English television crew. The story found a mention in the New York Times and in Correio do Minho, a regional newspaper in Portugal. Photographs appeared showing her in her dental surgery with her infant daughter in her arms. Despite the pioneering role she was playing in respect of Swiss politics, commentators were keen to stress her normality and refute the evidently widespread notion that "for a lot of people a woman who does politics is probably not like other women".

Women gained the right to vote in national elections only in 1971 and Marceline Miéville never became a member of the National Council (Swiss national parliament). She was, however, elected to the Regional parliament ("Grand Council") of Vaud in 1962. She resigned her seat when she joined the "Revolutionary Marxist League" in 1969, thereby making the point, in the words of one sympathetic commentator, that there was "more than one way to do politics".
