= Marcelline Picard-Kanapé =

Marcelline Picard-Kanapé CQ
- Born: 1941 (age 84–85); Pessamit, Quebec, Canada
- Education: Bachelor of education
- Alma mater: Université du Québec à Chicoutimi
- Occupation: Teacher (retired)

Marcelline Picard-Kanapé CQ, a.k.a. Marcelline P. Kanapé, (born 1941 in Betsiamites [now Pessamit] in the Côte-Nord region of Quebec) is considered one of the great specialists in education among First Nations in Canada, distinguishing herself since the 1950s. She was the first Innu teacher in Quebec, the first Aboriginal person to serve on the Conseil supérieur de l'éducation, and the first female Innu chief.

== Biography ==
Marcelline Picard-Kanapé is from the Innu community and First Nations reserve of Betsiamites (now Pessamit), near Rimouski, Quebec. She was the eldest of twelve children. She was schooled first by the Sisters of Charity and then studied at the École Normale du Bon-Conseil in Chicoutimi. In 1959, at age 18, she obtained a diploma in preschool and elementary school education and became the first Innu teacher in Quebec. She earned a bachelor's degree in education from the Université du Québec à Chicoutimi (UQAC) in 1988.

Picard-Kanapé taught primary education in Pessamit for two decades and struggled with the curriculum and system that shamed and divided generations of her people. Her dedication to the community saw her elected as an advisor to the Betsiamites Band Council at age 21. She was principal of the Betsiamites Elementary and Secondary School from 1977 to 1984. When control of the school system passed from the Department of Indian Affairs to the Band Council in 1980, she was ready to effect changes including the introduction of Innu language courses. In the process, she helped standardize the Innu language and develop the first Innu–French dictionary.

Picard-Kanapé was Director of Education at Pessamit then at Uashat-Maliotenam while sitting on the Conseil supérieur de l'Éducation du Québec (1989–1992), the first aboriginal person to do so. She was then elected Chief of the Betsiamites Band Council, the first woman to hold such a position. During two successive terms in office (1992–1996) she saw women represented in the community's political bodies.

Picard-Kanapé has also worked to facilitate cooperation between native and non-native peoples, taking part in many conferences and forums and in the creation of books on the subject. She sat on the board of directors of the Montagnais Cultural and Edutational Institute and evaluated the teacher training program at UQAC. She co-founded the Khani-Khant Choir and Native Dance troupes.

The Université du Québec's National Institute of Scientific Research awarded Picard-Kanapé an honorary doctorate in 2004. In 2006 she was appointed to the board of directors of the Côte-Nord Health and Social Services Agency, also sitting on its ethics and professional conduct committee. She later sat on the board of governors of the Université du Québec.

=== Professional experience ===
- 2012–2014: Vice-Chief at the Innu Council of Pessamit
- 1998–2006: Director Uashkaikan Secondary School of Pessamit
- 1997–1998: Director Otapi High School, Manawan
- 1992–1996: Chief of the band council of Pessamit
- 1989–1992: Director of Education Uashat-Maliotenam
- 1988: Responsible for dissemination and workshops on the standardization of Montagnais (Innu) spelling at Atikameku - Montagnais Educational and Cultural Institute
- 1984–1987: Director of Education Pessamit
- 1977–1984: Principal of Betsiamites Elementary and Secondary School for the Ministry of Indian Affairs
- 1959–1977: Primary education in Pessamit

=== Other experiences ===
- 2005: Member of the National Order of Quebec
- 1992: Member of the Board of Directors of the Montagnais Cultural and Educational Institute (ICEM).
- 1989-1992: Member of the Conseil Supérieur en Education of Quebec.
- 1984-1985: Member of the Evaluation Group of the Masters Training Program (UQAC, September 1984 - June 1985).
- 1984: Organizer of Heritage Week in Betsiamites (May 13 to May 20, 1984) and responsible for the reserves: Schefferville, La Romaine, Mingan, Sept-Iles, Les Escoumins, Natashquan and Pointe-Bleue.
- 1981–1987: Instigator and promoter of the pilot project (first teaching given in the Montagnais language at Betsiamites) - Ongoing project.
- 1972–1982: Councilor (Member of the Betsiamites Band Council):

== Distinctions ==
- 2013 – Queen Elizabeth II Diamond Jubilee Medal from the hands of the MNA for Manicouagan Jonathan Genest-Jourdain
- 2005 – Chevaliere of the National Order of Quebec
- 2004 – Honorary Doctorate, University of Quebec, National Institute of Scientific Research (INRS)
- 1994 – Medal of the Université du Québec à Chicoutimi
- 1985 – Betsiamites Educational Services Centre Tribute on 25 Years of Service to Education
- 1979 – Indian and Northern Affairs Canada Celebrates 20 Years of Service
- 1967 – Canadian Centennial Medal
