= La Clairière de Vaux =

French anarchist community

La Clairière de Vaux, also known as Milieu libre de Vaux or the Vaux Colony, was an early 1900s intentional community in Essômes-sur-Marne, northeastern France. It was the country's first anarchist commune.
