= La mère éducatrice =

French feminist anarchist magazine (1917–1939)

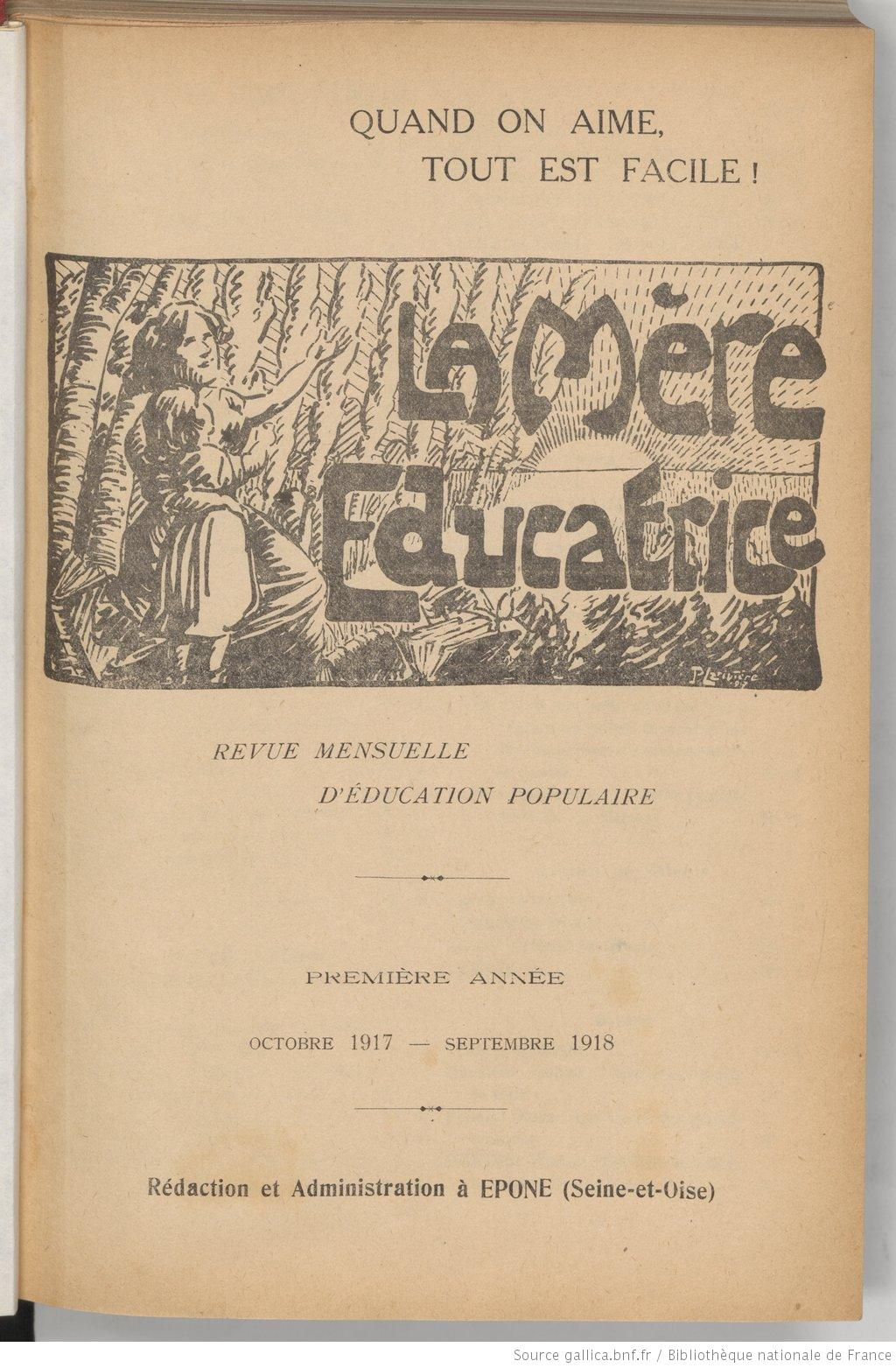
La mère éducatrice, the first issue 1917–1918

La mère éducatrice (French: Motherhood and Education) was a feminist anarchist magazine founded by Madeleine Vernet. It was first published in October 1917. Its headquarters was in Levallois-Perret. Madeleine Vernet also edited the magazine. The magazine adopted a pacifist, socialist and educative stance. In line with this approach, it argued that the major way to end war is education. It existed until 1939.
