= Le Populaire (French newspaper) =

French newspaper

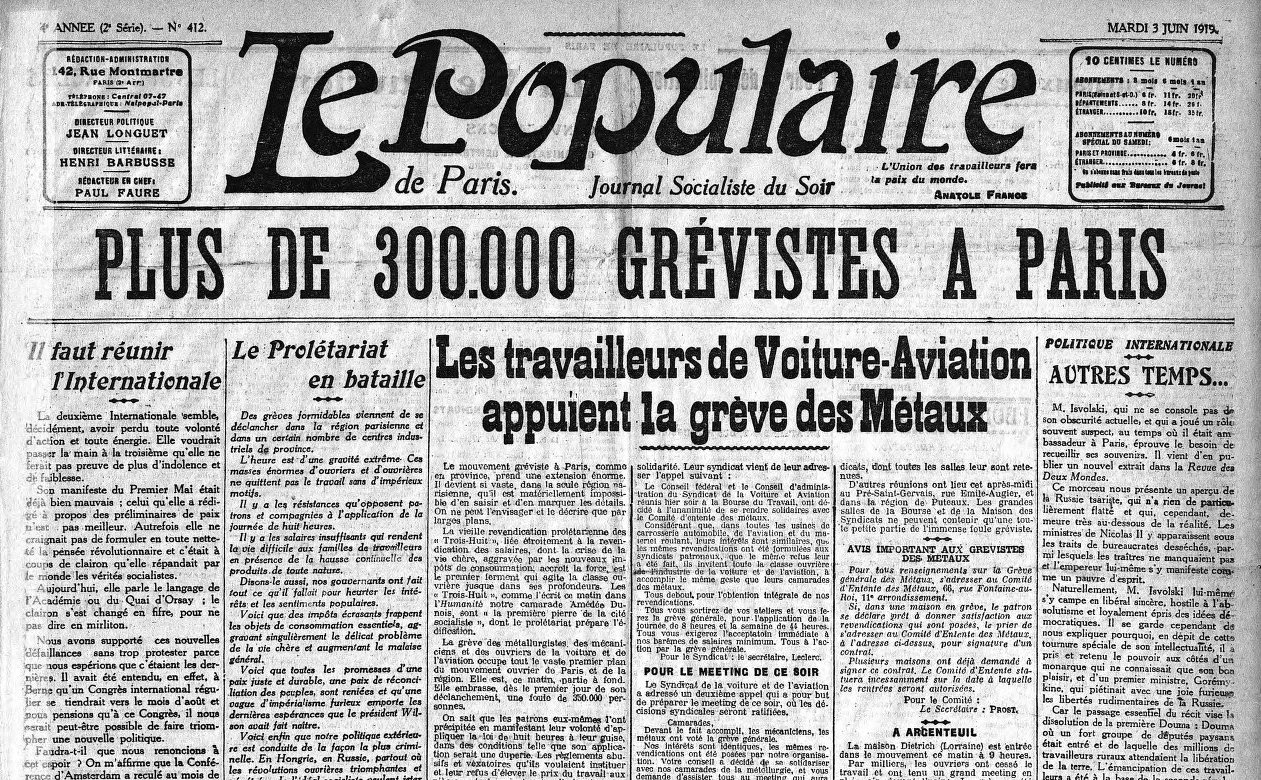
Le Populaire

Le Populaire was a socialist daily newspaper published in France. It was the main organ of the French Section of the Workers' International (SFIO) and, briefly, of the Socialist Party (PS).

== History and profile ==
Le Populaire was founded in 1918. When SFIO split at the 1920 Tours Congress, the Communists took control of the main socialist daily L'Humanité, while the Socialists retained control of Le Populaire, which became the official SFIO publication. In 1927 the paper began to be published daily.

Le Populaire was significantly weaker than its communist rival l'Humanité. Only during the period of 1936–1937 did the circulation of Le Populaire exceed 100,000. With the German invasion of France in 1940, Le Populaire suspended publication. Although it was resumed after the war, it never regained its prominence of the late 1930s and went into a strong decline during the 1960s, ceasing publication in 1970, a few months after the SFIO had merged into the newly-established Socialist Party (PS).
