= Josef Friedrich Matthes =

German politician (1886–1943)

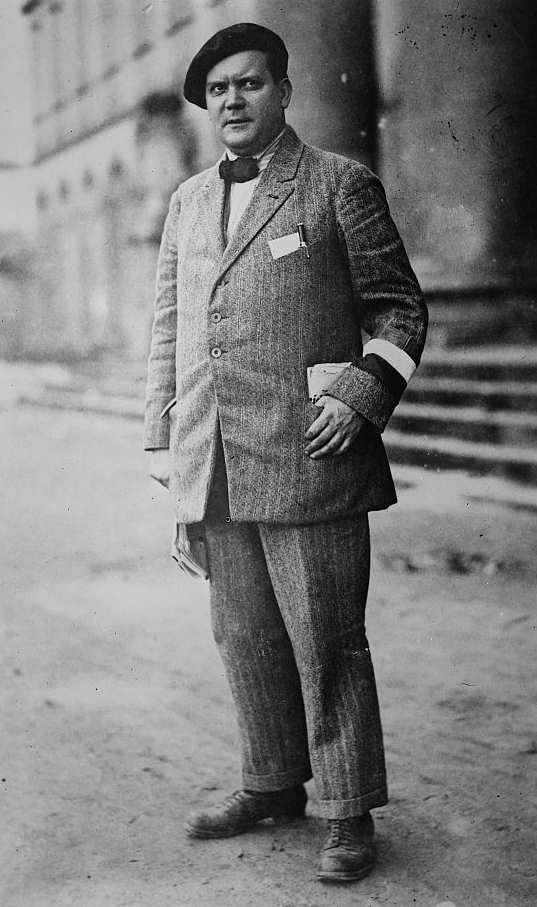
Matthes in 1923

Josef Friedrich Matthes (10 February 1886 – 9 October 1943) was head of the short lived Rhenish Republic.

== Biography ==
Matthes was born on 10 February 1886 in Würzburg. He moved to Switzerland in 1909 and worked as an editor in Baden. By 1918, he was editor of the Social Democratic Party of Germany's newspaper in Aschaffenburg. In 1921 he was convicted of libel and sentenced to 6 months in prison after accusing the major of hoarding food. He fled to Wiesbaden, then under French occupation, where he worked as editor of the magazine "The Torch" (Die Fackel).

In early 1923, he was co-founder of the "Rheinischer Unabhängigkeitsbund", which sought independence for the Rhineland. In October 1923, he and his supporters seized the city of Koblenz in a putsch, founding the Rhenish Republic with Matthes as its leader. The power of the new government relied essentially on the French occupiers and the "Rhineland-protection forces". A massive wave of looting by the peacekeepers led to resistance in the population. By November riots led to killings in clashes between the security forces and opponents of the separatists. The strength of the resistance proved too much for the government and the "Republic" collapsed. Matthes fled to France.

By 1930, Matthes was working as a journalist in Paris. After the Fall of France in 1940, he was arrested. In the following year, he was extradited to Germany and deported to the Dachau concentration camp. He died there on 9 October 1943.
