= Giliana Berneri =

French doctor and communist activist

Giliana Berneri (Italian) Giliane Berneri (French)
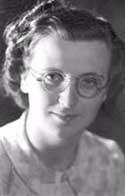
- Born: 5 October 1919; Florence, Tuscany, Kingdom of Italy
- Died: 19 July 1998; Paris, France
- Occupations: Communist libertarian activist Medical doctor
- Spouse(s): Serge Ninn (real name Jean Senninger)
- Children: Hélène Senninger (1950); Franck Senninger (1955)
- Parent(s): Camillo Berneri; Giovanna Berneri

Giliana Berneri or Giliane Berneri (5 October 1919 – 19 July 1998) was a French doctor of medicine and a libertarian communist activist.

== Early life and education ==
Giliana Berneri was the second daughter of the eminent Italian anarchist and academic Camillo Berneri and his similarly focused wife Giovanna Berneri (born Giovanna Caleffi). Giliana and her elder sister Marie-Louise Berneri were born in Tuscany, but the family fled to France in 1926 in order to escape the Fascist Mussolini government. Her father's scathing anti-Fascist newspaper articles had marked the family out for persecution. In France he was unable to find permanent employment, and frequently went into hiding to avoid the unwelcome attentions of the Italian Security Services. Nevertheless, there was considerable solidarity among the political anti-Fascist exiles in Paris and eventually Giovanna, the girls' mother, was able to set up a fruit and vegetable shop in a popular quarter. Money continued to be short, but the family survived and the daughters' education was financed, both qualifying as medical doctors. Giliana's specialisms became Pediatrics and Psychoanalysis.

On 5 May 1937 her father was assassinated, together with his friend and fellow anarchist Francesco "Ciccio" Barbieri, in Barcelona. They had been dragged off by a gang of a dozen men, and their bodies were found riddled with bullets the next day. Although the killers and the sequence of events in the hours before the killings were never precisely identified, it quickly became believed that Camillo Berneri had been murdered on Stalin's orders after his journalism had highlighted Soviet involvement in the Spanish Civil War.

Although Giliana pursued her medical studies in Paris with continued energy, the circumstances of her father's death provided her with a compelling motivation to continue with her father's political work, and it is for her political activity that she is more widely remembered.

== Political activism ==
In 1938 Giliana and her sister, Marie-Louise Berneri, took part in the production and publication of the review Révision, founded by Louis Mercier-Vega, Lucien Feuillade and Nicolas Lazarévitch. In 1940 she was involved in the successful campaign to have her comrade and fellow (originally Italian) anarchist Ernesto Bonomini released from a French internment camp - possibly Camp Vernet - and she may have accompanied Bonomini into political exile in the United States.

The Second World War ended in May 1945 and Giliana returned to France and married her partner, Jean Senninger (generally known as "Serge Ninn") while her sister remained in London with her English anarchist husband Vernon Richards. During the war, their mother Giovanna Berneri had been arrested and deported first to Germany and then to Italy where she had spent most of the war under house arrest. At the 1948 anarchist conference in Paris, the first after the war, all three women were present, each representing a different country, the mother with the Italian delegation while her daughters represented respectively Britain and France.

Giliane Berneri took French citizenship on 17 October 1947. She was active in the French libertarian movement until the mid-1950s. In the aftermath of the war she was among the founders of the French Anarchist Federation, along with Maurice Joyeux, Georges Fontenis, Suzy Chevet, Renée Lamberet, Georges Vincey, Aristide Lapeyre, Paul Lapeyre, Maurice Laisant, Solange Dumont, Maurice Fayolle and Roger Caron.

Giliane and her husband were drawn to the Paris-based Sacco and Vanzetti group, which developed into the Kronstadt group within the Anarchist Federation. In 1948 this group comprised "approximately twenty militants and sympathisers belonging to the university [of the Sorbonne], in the metallurgy, buildings, medical and hospital departments, focused the books and instruction" including Georg K. Glaser and André Prudhommeaux. Her home in the Latin Quarter of Paris was one of those scheduled for police monitoring.

Giliane Berneri: some publications
- Sur quelques cas de polynévrites par intoxication alimentaire accidentelle par des substances contenant du triorthocresyl phosphate, thèse, Médecine, Paris, 1946, OCLC 492982703.
- Notes prises au cours de la conférence sur l'orientation professionnelle pratiquée par le service médical à la Chambre des métiers de Seine-et-Oise, Paris, mars 1957, OCLC 458487350.

During this period she was a leading figure in the Cercle libertaire des étudiants (Libertarian Students' Circle/ CLE) which organised meetings with leading icons of the left such as André Prudhommeaux, and with writers closely attached to libertarian objectives such as Albert Camus. She worked on the editorial team of the journal Le Libertaire. Unlike her husband, however, she refused to become involved in the initiatives of Georges Fontenis to create a secret (and manipulative) sub-group within the French Anarchist Federation, to be known by the name "Organisation Pensée Bataille", the machinations of which she later, reportedly, denounced.

During the later 1950s Giliane Berneri became disillusioned by the internal quarrels affecting the French anarchist movement, and her activist contributions to it came to an end.

== Personal life ==
Berneri married Jean Senninger (known as Serge Ninn) in 1945. They had two children, Hélène (born 1950) and Franck (born 1955). Both became doctors, Hélène specialising in paediatrics and Franck in endocrinology and dietology, as well writing novels under the pen name F. Berneri Croce.

Giliane Berneri died on the 19th July 1998 in Paris.

== Legacy ==
In 1962, when her mother died, she donated all the family archives to journalist and historian Aurelio Chessa who used them as the basis of a substantial "anarchism archive", the Archivio Famiglia Berneri-Chessa ("Berneri-Chesso Family Archive") which has been accommodated in the Biblioteca Panizzi (Panizzi Library) at Reggio Emilia since 1998.
