= Renée Lamberet =

French historian (1901–1980)

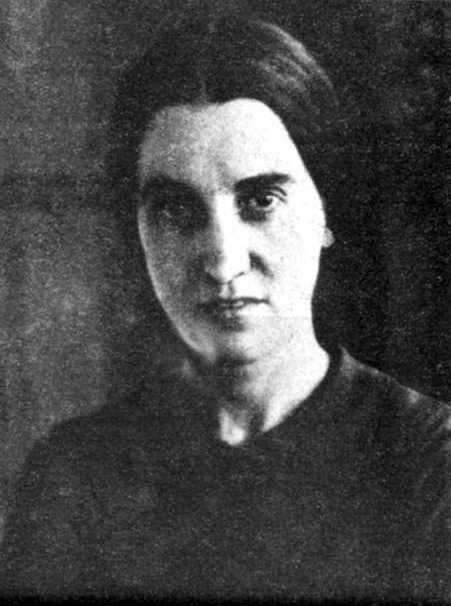
- Lamberet, circa 1938
- Born: 4 October 1901
- Died: 12 March 1980 (aged 78); Villeneuve-Saint-Georges, France
- Occupations: Historian, professor, and anarchist revolutionary

Renée Lamberet (4 October 1901 – 12 March 1980) was a French anarchist historian.

== Biography ==
Lamberet was born in Paris into a family of free thinkers. As a young professor of history and geography, she collaborated with the historian Max Nettlau, notably producing the work La Première Internationale en Espagne (1868–1888) (The First International in Spain).

Thanks to several visits to Catalonia with her sister, Madeleine Lamberet, she was familiar with the anarchist movement in Spain. Thanks to her role as a historian, in 1936 she was able to obtain access to documents related to the collectivisations that were in progress. It was in this context that she met Bernardo Pozo Riera, head of the Press and Propaganda Office of the Spanish Confederación Nacional del Trabajo and the Federación Anarquista Ibérica. Their relationship went from professional to intimate until the latter's death in 1956.

During the Spanish Revolution of 1936, she fostered intense activity under the auspices of the Solidaridad Internacional Antifascista (SIA), helping to develop the "Spartaco" children's colony to host refugee children from Basque Country, Asturias and the front in Madrid.

During this period, she contributed to Spain and the World, published by London's Freedom Press.

== Organiser of the Anarchist Federation ==
After the close of World War II, she helped in re-establishing the Anarchist Federation in France, alongside Robert Joulin, Henri Bouyé, Maurice Joyeux, Georges Fontenis, Suzy Chevet, Georges Vincey, Aristide and Paul Lapeyre, Maurice Laisant, Giliane Berneri, Solange Dumont, Roger Caron, Maurice Fayolle, Henri Oriol and Paul Chery.

== Bibliography ==
- Nettlau, Max (1969). Lamberet, Renée (ed.). La Première Internationale en Espagne (1868–1888) (in French). Dordrecht: D. Reidel. OCLC 567252.
- Lamberet, Renée (1953). Mouvements ouvriers et socialistes (Chronologie et bibliographie) L'Espagne (1750-1936) (in French). Paris: Les Editions Ouvrieres. OCLC 12734835.
