= Georges Vincey =

French anarchist (1900–1960)

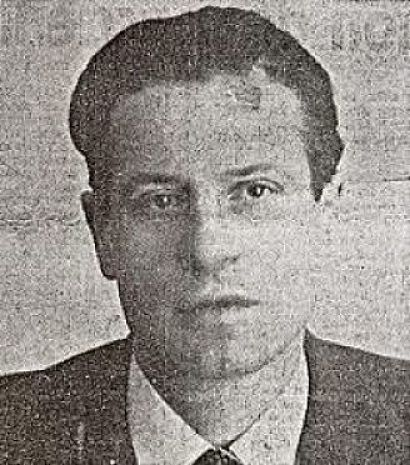
- Georges Vincey (unknown date)
- Born: ca.1900
- Died: February 1960
- Occupation: individualist anarchist

Georges Vincey (died February 1960 aged approximately 60) was a French metal worker and militant anarchist. In October 1954 he became the first administrator of the newly reinvented Monde libertaire, a monthly publication produced on behalf of the Paris based Anarchist Federation.

== Life ==
At the end of the First World War Vincey, then a metal worker ("ouvrier serrurier") joined a group called "Jeunesses syndicalistes" ("Young Trades Unionists").

Through the individualist anarchist ideas then current, he later found himself in sympathy with what was becoming the Libertarian Movement. His robust intellect rapidly came to focus on the economic problems of the post-war years. The Anarcho communist Georges Fontenis would later describe Vincy's philosophy at this time as that of a "Stirnerian individualist". Directly after his death in 1960 Vincey was reported as having often described himself to Émile Armand as "an individualist adherent of the organisation founded on the responsibility of the free individual, within a group structure determined by collective agreement, to organise without any constraints the work he has accepted".

He became aligned with the Anarchist Union ("l’Union anarchiste") and then, from 1936, with the Anarchist Federation of the French-speaking world ("la Fédération anarchiste de langue française"). Following the German invasion of May/June 1940 he took part in clandestine meetings which enabled the anarchists of Paris to maintain contact.

After the liberation Georges Vincey was one of those who re-established the French Anarchist Federation. Others included Robert Joulin, Henri Bouyé, Georges Fontenis, Suzy Chevet, Renée Lamberet, Maurice Joyeux, Aristide and Paul Lapeyre, Maurice Fayolle, Maurice Laisant, Giliana Berneri, Solange Dumont, Roger Caron, Henri Oriol and Paul Chery.

Between 25 and 27 December 1945 he took part in the founding congress of the French Anarchist Federation, applying the idea of Synthesis anarchism, and made up of excluded groups and former militants who had left the old fractured and more narrowly focused anarchist groupings in response to practices by those groupings deemed gratuitously authoritarian. Basic principals were drawn up for the new Federation to maximise the numbers while embracing a disparate range of anarchist views. This was challenging, as the instigator of the reconstituted Anarchist Federation, Maurice Joyeux found himself obliged to compromise with individualist anarchists such as Vincey. The outcome was an operational approach that Joyeux described as "impossible": requiring decisions to be unanimous had the effect of giving every member a power of veto over the Federation's direction.

In October 1954 Georges Vincey was appointed administrator of the anarchist movement's collectively produced journal, the Monde libertaire. He would retain these responsibilities till forced out by his illness in May 1959.

== Evaluation ==
The historian Cédric Guérin writes that Georges Vincey was

"... famously an individualist ... but not a fierce opponent of the organisation. On the contrary, he backed an appropriately structured organisation, which may explain his support for the "Synthesis" Anarchist Federation after 1953. A good orator, he was one of those who advocated oral propaganda ... . If, in the judgement of Maurice Joyeux, the individualist anarchism of Vincey was the anarchism of a powerful personality, Joyeux nevertheless stressed in his own memoirs the important role that individualists like Vincey could perform, especially when conferring total respect on the fundamental principals of the anarchist philosophy".
