= Paule Tricheux =

French anarchist (c. 1880 – 1960)

- Born: 1880s Roubia
- Died: 9 August 1960; Toulouse
- Occupation: Anarchist, lingère
- Children: Noëlla Tricheux

Paule Tricheux (c. 1880 – 1960) was a French seamstress, resistance fighter, and anarchist activist. She first participated in anarchist groups, then took part in an anarchist experiment in Spain during the Spanish Civil War, before joining the Resistance and working to ensure the survival of the French and Spanish anarchist communist movements during the Nazi Occupation. At the end of the war, she actively contributed to the reconstruction of the movement.

== Biography ==
Born in Roubia, in the Aude region, around 1880, Paule Fabre was a seamstress and laundress. She moved to Cuba to live in Havana with Alphonse Tricheux, whom she married in 1901. In 1919, she returned to France from Cuba with her partner and their three children. In the 1920s, Tricheux joined the Toulouse anarchist group Bien-être et Liberté.

She participated in mobilizations advocating for the release of Sacco and Vanzetti, carrying placards at the head of marches. On the placards she held, she wrote: “Free the victims of international capitalism! Long live anarchy, freedom for political prisoners, save Sacco and Vanzetti”. Tricheux also sold Le Libertaire at the Toulouse market every Sunday morning.

After the Francoist coup and the Spanish social revolution, the activist began by raising funds for anarchists. She then joined Puigcerdà, where she took part in organizing an anarchist experiment in the town. Notably, she helped women in the community take on greater responsibilities and move beyond traditionally gendered roles. She also received clothing parcels from France intended to help cover sick or vulnerable individuals. In June 1937, Tricheux was arrested along with her entire family by communists and remained in detention for six months.

During World War II, she hosted clandestine meetings of the French and Spanish libertarian movements at her farm. In 1943, she organized one of the key meetings for the reconstitution of the anarchist movement in France. This "congress", held on 15-19 July 1943, brought together numerous anarchists, including Volin and Jean-René Saulière, to discuss actions to take and whether or not to support other resistance groups.

She died on 9 August 1960, in Toulouse.

== Legacy ==
Maurice Laisant paid tribute to her after her death in Le Monde libertaire.
