= Pierre Morain =

French activist (1930–2013)

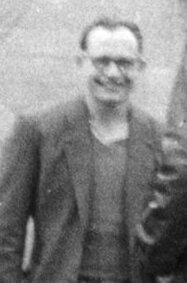
- Pierre Morain following his release from prison, March 1956
- Born: Pierre Louis Robert Morain; 12 April 1930; Saint-Germain-en-Laye, Seine-et-Oise, France
- Died: 27 May 2013 (aged 83); Verrières, Aveyron, France
- Occupations: Building worker Trades union activist Libertarian communist Anti-colonialist activist
- Political party: PCF (briefly)
- Spouse: Suzanne Gouillardon
- Children: Claude Mourain (1958-2013)
- Parent(s): Robert Mourain; Suzanne Courtois

Pierre Morain (12 April 1930 – 27 May 2013) was a building worker, a trades unionist, a militant libertarian communist and an anti-colonialist activist. For most purposes he would be considered a Frenchman. However, when he faced trial in connection with a newspaper article he had written opposing the government position in respect of the Algerian War, the president of the court noticed that his nineteen co-defendants were all Algerian and felt it necessary to clarify Morain's nationality: "But you .. are nevertheless French". Morain's defiant clarification is often requoted when Pierre Morain is discussed: "No, I'm not French. I'm a worker". When he was arrested on 29 May 1955 (or 29 June 1955: sources differ) Morain became the first French anti-colonialist activist to be sent to prison for supporting Algerian independence.

== Life ==
=== Provenance and early years ===
Pierre Morain was born at Saint-Germain-en-Laye, a short distance down-river from Paris. Robert Morain, his father, worked for the government in an administrative capacity. Suzanne Courtois, his mother, worked as a typist. In 1947 Pierre Morain started working as a tiler for a small building company based at Saint-Germain-en-Laye. At some stage, probably quite early on, he joined the "Building Workers' Union" ("Syndicat Unique du bâtiment" / SUB). In 1949 he started working in the workers' cooperative, "Le Carrelage à Vanves" which had been founded back in 1936 by the Communist Party ("Parti communiste français" / PCF) and the CGT (trades union). Becoming unemployed, he joined the PCF and CGT.

=== National service and demobilisation ===
The German Federal Republic (West Germany) was relaunched in May 1949 through a coming together of three of the four military occupation zones into which the country had been divided after the war. Allied armies remained in the country, however, though by now the principal perceived risk came from the fraternal forces across the new "Iron Curtain", occupying what had been identified till October 1949 as the Soviet occupation zone. Morain undertook his military service between April 1950 and October 1951 with an Engineering Regiment based in Trier, close to the West German frontier with Luxembourg. The regiment had a "troubled" reputation with the political establishment, having had its "colours" withdrawn following a refusal to carry out orders to put down strikes during 1947/48. Military service exposed Morain to libertarian and anti-militarist ideas. Released from the military late in 1951, he returned to building work in the Paris suburbs. He also volunteered intermittently as an adult mentor at the "Cité de l'Esperance" (loosely "City of hopefulness"), a refuge for "difficult or delinquent young people" at Conflans-Sainte-Honorine.

=== Trades union activism ===
The "Building Workers' Union" (SUB) was part of the National Labour Confederation ("Confédération nationale du travail" / CNT), a left-wing organisation which at the time would have seen itself as part of the Anarcho-syndicalist movement. Membership of the SUB evidently meant that Morain was also a member of the CNT in or before 1953, which was the year in which he became Paris Region Secretary of the SUB. He contributed to the journal "Combat Syndicaliste" and at the CNT's second Paris regional congress, held on 29 November 1953, he was elected to membership of the CNT's administrative commission. According to some sources it was also at around this time that he became a member of the Anarchist Federation, but this is strenuously disputed. He would, in any event, join its successor organisation in 1954.

=== Focus on Algeria ===
As an officer of the CNT Morain quickly became disenchanted with the destructive internal quarrels among comrades. He was already deeply supportive of the rising tide of an anti-colonialist sentiment among the intellectual classes and during the summer of 1954 he joined the Communist Libertarian Federation ("Fédération communiste libertaire" / FCL) which from its inception was always strongly supportive of Algerian independence. By this time he was living in the northern part of central Paris, close to the Gare de l’Est, in a building managed by the Movement for the Liberation of the People ("Mouvement de libération du peuple" / MLP), a small but dedicated party of the political left that traced its origins back to the 1930s.

In the spring of 1953 (or 1954 or 1955: sources differ), with the agreement of Messali Hadj and the Algerian National Movement ("Mouvement national algérien" / MNA), Morain was sent to northern France to organise anti-colonialist agitation and demonstrate solidarity with Algerian militants employed in the northern factories. Through Michel Hulot he made contact with Algerian militant leaders. On 21 April 1955 he was hired by the Carrette-Duburcq company in Roubaix. He tried to put together a support committee for the MNA but in this he was not successful. He found no sign of an active trades union presence, and although most of his co-workers were Algerian, he spent much of the time assigned to small construction sites where large scale political organisation was impossible. He was armed with a list of subscribers in the area for "Le Libertaire", the anarchist newspaper, but when he made contact with the publication's readers in and around Roubaix and Lille he was disappointed to find that they "were not militants". During this time, in the evenings, he tried to attract support by selling copies of "Le Libertaire", in cafes frequented by Algerian workers. He was also the writer of several major articles appearing in "Libertaire", dealing with the working conditions of Algerian workers employed by the textile factories and other industrial enterprises in Roubaix.

On 1 May 1955 Morain participated in the violent confrontations which took place in Lille between police and demonstrators carrying banners proclaiming the "Free Algeria" message. A couple of weeks later he was apprehended by customs officials after he had been spotted on the bus connecting Roubaix and Tourcoing, distributing leaflets on behalf of the "Anticolinialist Liberation movement" ("Mouvement de Libération Anticolonialiste " / MLA). The customs officials questioned him to establish if he was the author of an article that had appeared earlier that month in "Le Libertaire". Commentators stress that it was not his involvement in the violent street demonstration of 1 May 1955 that concerned the authorities at this stage, but his authorship of an article that had appeared in the 5 May edition of an anarchist magazine under the eye-catching title, "In the north the Algerians have shown French workers the way ahead" ("Dans le Nord, les Algériens ont montré l’exemple aux travailleurs français."). Following the questioning the customs officials communicated their conclusions to the police, and Pierre Morain was arrested on 29 May or 29 June 1955. (Sources sometimes differ on dates but agree on all the other material aspects of the affair.)

=== Trial and imprisonment ===
He faced trial shortly afterwards. The president of the court, considering his involvement alongside a number of Algerian liberation activists in the 1 May Lille street protest, asked for confirmation that Morain himself was nevertheless French. The attempt to obtain confirmation on this point elicited the following memorable clarification from Morain: "I'm not French. I'm a worker" (" moi je ne suis pas français, je suis ouvrier "). Along with three Algerian activists, Morain was sentenced to a five-month prison term on account of his participation in the events on 1 May 1955. A headline in the next edition of "Le Libertaire", which appeared on 7 July 1955, made clear that the anarchist publication was in no doubt over Morain's Frenchness, "Our comrade is the first anticolonialist Frenchman to receive a jail term since the start of the November events [campaigning for Algerian independence]" ("Notre camarade est le premier militant anticolonialiste français incarcéré depuis le débuts des événements de novembre"). Later, the authorities appealed the sentence which was in the end extended so that he was locked up till 29 March 1956.

He was sent to serve his sentence, with the others, at the prison at Loos, a former abbey on the edge of Lille. He was transferred to nearby Douai on 12 September 1955. It was during his time at Douai that he first heard mention of the (Algerian) National Liberation Front (جبهة التحرير الوطني / "Front de libération nationale" / FLN). At the end of September 1955 the prosecutor persuaded an appeal court in Douai to extend his sentence to one year: "For Morain, the case is more serious because, gentlement, Morain is French..." (" Pour Morain, le cas est plus grave, car, Messieurs, Morain est français…"). He was transferred again on 22 November 1955 to The Santé Prison in Paris, from where in the end he was released at the end of March 1956.

=== Public figure ===
When Pierre Morain was sent to prison few had heard of him. By the time of his release at the end of March 1956 that had changed. In Paris a "Committee for the liberation of Pierre Morain and for the defence of democratic liberties ("Comité pour la libération de Pierre Morain et pour la défense des libertés démocratiques") was established at the instigation of the polemicist Claude Bourdet. Leading members included Jean Cassou, Daniel Guérin, Claude Dechezelles, André Breton, Georges Fontenis, André Marty, Jean-Marie Domenach and the anarchist militants Jacques Danos and Armand Robin. One of France's most high profile intellectuals, Albert Camus, put his name to a powerful message of support published in L'Express on 15 November 1955: "Sticking with the commonplace, I note that a young militant, Pierre Morain, has been placed behind bars because he has demonstrated a contrarian spirit over the matter of Algerian policy. The protests till now had been limited to small minority groups, but Morain committed the double sin of being both a worker and an anarchist-libertarian." ("Pour en rester aux vulgarités, je signale qu'un jeune militant, Pierre Morain, a été placé sous les verrous pour avoir manifesté un mauvais esprit en matière de politique algérienne. La protestation jusqu'à présent a été limitée à d'étroits secteurs de l'opinion, Morain ayant le double tort d'être ouvrier et libertaire.") Albert Camus was in some ways himself conflicted over the Algeria crisis, but he was steadfast in his opposition to unjust punishment of those who struggled for Algerian independence, and he would continue to back Pierre Morain's activism the rest of his life. Even after his release in March 1956, Pierre Morain was still facing a charge of "undermining the external security of the state", on account of an anti-colonialist article that had appeared in "Le Libertaire" before his imprisonment. The February before his release saw the publication by his defence committee of the pamphlet "One man, one cause, Pierre Morain state prisoner" ("Un homme, une cause, Pierre Morain prisonnier d’Etat").

One result of all the publicity was that a young teacher and FCL activist, Suzanne Gouillardon, began to write to him while he was in prison. After his release it was through the FCL that Morain channelled his anti-colonialist political activism. He also teamed up with Suzanne Gouillardon. They married in Paris on 13 June 1957, by which time Morain was back in prison.

=== Back to jail ===
During the summer of 1956 the FCL was "forced underground" by the authorities, leading some members to leave the organisation. Morain did not quit. He lived unregistered in a garden shed in Pontoise for several months. In January 1957 he was part of an FCL team that launched an attack involving plastic explosives against a Poujadiste cell along the Rue Blomet in the 15th arrondissement of Paris. The attack seems to have been inspired by an agent provocateur who had been infiltrated into the FCL team, and Morain was arrested on 16 February 1957. Other prominent FCL activists were arrested in connection with the same incident, which appears to have been part of a successful strategy of suppression on the part of the authorities. Morain was initially detained back in The Santé Prison, which is where he married Suzanne Gouillardon. Later, on 21 May 1958, he was transferred to Poissy in the western suburbs of Paris. He was released on 11 April 1959.

=== Back to the building trade and a slide to the fringes of politics ===
He now rejoined his wife who had set up home in Nièvre, a rural department in the heart of France and, importantly, some distance from Paris. The couple remained together till separated by death. Morain returned to work in the building trade and joined/rejoined the CGT at Nevers, quickly becoming regional treasurer for the union division for building and public works, and then union secretary for the department. He was involved in setting up several union branches in the building sector.

At the end of 1959, as a new French government cautiously began the shift towards acceptance of Algerian independence and fighting in Algeria increasingly acquired the character of a civil war, Pierre Morain rejoined the Communist Party. He also teamed up with Georges Fontenis to join "Voie communiste" (loosely, "Communist path"), intended as an "ecumenical" grouping of the ultra-left committed, principally, to Algerian independence. It quickly became seen as an internal opposition grouping within the party, however. In 1967 Morain made contact with "Vietnam Base Committees", which led to accusations from party comrades that he was becoming "pro-Chinese". The accusations seemed to be vindicated when also became involved with the Union of Young Marxist-Leninist Communists ("Union des jeunesses communistes marxistes-léninistes" / UJC(ml)). Unlike communist parties elsewhere in western Europe, the French Communist Party still enjoyed mass support during the 1950s and 1960s, regularly polling above 20% in general elections, and still nurturing ambitions for inclusion in national government coalitions. Pierre Morain's apparent Maoist sympathies were therefore to be taken seriously, and during the winter of 1967/68 he was expelled from the Communist Party. During the May 1968 events he also found himself sidelined by the CGT.

In the aftermath of May 1968 Georges Fontenis re-established contact and together they tried to relaunch the network of former comrades from their FCL days and launching an appeal to members of the Union des groupes anarchistes communistes (UGAC), another organisation which seems by this time to have been effectively defunct. This attempt at reactivating old fores seems quickly to have run out of steam. Between 1968 and 1976 he was active in Maoist circles and in the related Gauche prolétarienne movement, partly from habit and because of his taste for political activism. He also became involved in the establishment of an autonomous worker-peasant group.

=== Final years ===
In 1974 Morain was in contact with the Revolutionary Anarchist Organisation (ORA), and he took part in the "Pour qu’une force s’assemble" process which was intended to form a "left-wing workers'" movement with the ORA at its core. Although a succession of organisational reconfigurations took place over the next few years, it is not clear how far any of these corresponded with Morain's vision, however. Pierre and Suzanne Morain visited the Larzac plateau in 1976 in order to join in the demonstrations and other actions against government plans (subsequently abandoned) massively to extend a military base there (from 30 to 170 square kilometers) which reportedly would have necessitated the expropriation of 107 farms and 12 villages. The scale of the government plans meant that by now there was a large community of left-wing activists based in the area in order to oppose the development. The Moarains found themselves accepted and integrated into the local community and decided to relocated permanently to the Larzac, moving into an abandoned farmstead inside the proposed confines of the new "forbidden zone". They joined a local "buildings team" ("équipe du bâtiment ") to help upgrade the built environment. This is where they lived until shortly before Pierre Morain's death in 2013. They continued to involve themselves in left wing causes nationally and internationally, notably in support of oppressed members of Kanak, Nicaraguan and Palestinian communities.

In 1983 Morain joined the administrative council of the Larzac Foundation (subsequently rebaptised "Larzac Solidarity"). In 1999 they joined José Bové in the widely reported "taking down" of a new McDonald's outlet at Millau as a protest against the mercantilist trade policies of the United States government.

In March 2013 Claude Morain, the couple's son, died at La Roque-Sainte-Marguerite aged just 55. Pierre and Suzanne Morain were both in poor health by this stage and Pierre Morain died a couple of months later at nearby Verrières. His funeral provided an opportunity for a large reunion of old libertarian activists at the hamlet of Saint-Martin-du-Larzac.
