= Paul Lapeyre =

French anarchist (1901–1991)

Paul Lapeyre (28 May 1901 – 2 May 1991) was a militant anarchist, anarcho-syndicalist and free-thinker.

== Biography ==
=== Provenance and early years ===
Paul Lapeyre was born in Monguilhem (Gers), a (very) small town in southwestern France. His father was a small-farmer who became a postman. The family was politically committed. Paul Lapeyre embarked on a career as a teacher, but his anti-militarist stance and his internationalism led to his exclusion from the state education system. In November 1926, with his brothers Aristide and Laurent, he participated in the establishment of the Confédération Générale du Travail-Syndicaliste Révolutionnaire (CGT) and thereafter contributed articles to the Le Combat syndicaliste, the weekly political magazine of France's principal trades union grouping the CGT.

=== The 1930s and the Spanish Civil War ===
Between 1930 and 1939 he worked at "Lucifer", at times using the pseudonym "Paul Bordeaux". Lucifer was a publishing house founded by his brother in 1929. He also contributed to "La Révolte", described as the "anarchist organ of the (French) southwest". During the 1930s he also came to the fore as a campaigner and activist, appearing as an effective speaker at numerous public meetings convened in support of the 1936 Spanish Revolution. In particular, he addressed a meeting in August 1936 at the Salle Wagram (auditorium) that had been organised by the "Anarcho-syndicatist Committee for the defence and liberation of the Spanish people", which enabled him to report back on his own recent visit to Spain during what came to be identified as the opening months of the Spanish Civil War. During January - March 1937 he undertook a "propaganda tour" (Note: During the 1930s the word "propaganda" had not yet acquired the powerfully negative connotations that it has subsequently taken on.) in Algeria under the auspices of the Confédération Générale du Travail-Syndicaliste Révolutionnaire (loosely, "General Confederation of Revolutionary Trade Unions" / CGT-SR), setting up a dozen "conferences" to support the Spanish Revolution. The three Lapeyre brothers organised networks to procure and provide armaments and medical supplies for comrades in the (Spanish) National Confederation of Labour ("Confederación Nacional del Trabajo" / CNT). Paul Lapeyre contributed to "L'Espagne Antifasciste", a periodical published in Bordeaux which at the start of 1938 merged with André Prudhommeaux's " L'Espagne nouvelle". He wrote for "SIA", the weekly publication of the French section of the "International antifascist solidarity" ("Solidarité internationale antifasciste") which had been founded and was headed up by Louis Lecoin and Nicolas Faucier as a further response to the unfolding tragedy in Spain. Lapeyre himself also made a number of further visits to Spain, mandated by the CGT-SR.

In September 1938 the names of Paul Lapeyre and his brother Laurent were placed on the registry for political Carnet B government surveillance.

=== Prisoner of war ===
During 1938 and 1939 there was a growing belief that another war between France and Germany was becoming inevitable. In September 1939 the French government declared war on Germany, and a general mobilisation was implemented. At its final meeting (before it was banned) the CGT-SR) ten days earlier, had finalised plans to call a general strike in the event of a general mobilisation, but those plans appear not to have survived the reality of the German and Soviet invasions of Poland. Paul Lapeyre was among those conscripted to join the army in August/September 1939. He hesitated for several days before reporting to the barracks at Auch. He was sent to Alsace, which had been reincorporated into France in 1919, and spent several months on the banks of the Rhine. It was presumably in the context of the German invasion of France, which took place during May and June 1940, that the regiment in which Lapeyre was serving found itself surrounded and obliged to surrender. Now German prisoners of war, Lapeyre and his comrades were held in their barracks for slightly more than a month before being transferred to a large farm and set to work at Hoisdorf, some 25 km (16 miles) to the east of Hamburg. An escape attempt failed. Lapeyre spent the next five years in a succession of four labour camps. At one point he narrowly avoided being sent to the notorious death camp at Rava-Ruska, but in the end he was sent back to the Hamburg region where he worked alongside the other prisoners of war. During a week in July 1943 "allied" bomb attacks completely destroyed the saw mill to which he had been assigned. In the end, however, he was liberated by the English ("... par les Anglais") in June 1945.

=== New beginnings ===
After the liberation Paul Lapeyre re-established links with others who had been CGT-SR activists before 1939, such as Julien Toublet and Pierre Besnard. Along with his brother Aristide he was part of the little team representing the Bordeaux region at the congress in Paris of 6/7 October 1945 which marked the birth of the new "Fédération anarchiste" (FA). He also took part in the congress of 7–9 December 1945 which established the National Confederation of Labour - French section ("Confédération nationale du travail (France)" / CNTF), which was a continuation of the pre-war CNT (no longer able to operate in Francoist Spain). Just as before the war, the inspiration of Pierre Besnard played a defining role. Lapeyre then became secretary of the Bordeaux regional union and of the "8th regional union" of the CNTF).

There followed several years during which Lapeyre was involved in breakaway attempts involving the CNTF) and other groups in the Bordeaux region to break away from the CGT failed to gain significant traction on the national stage. At the end of May 1952 a (FA) congress was held at Bordeaux at which Paul Lapeyre was one of several prominently dissident members excluded from membership. Others were his brother Aristide, Maurice Joyeux, Maurice Fayolle, André Arru and Georges Vincey. This was part of a wider process by which Georges Fontenis was pushing the (FA) towards becoming what sources identify as a "communist libertarian federation" (une "Fédération communiste libertaire"). Shortly after this George Fontenis renamed what remained of the Anarchist Federation, which now became the Libertarian Communist Federation (FCL).

Between 25 and 27 December 1953 Paul Lapeyre took part in the congress at Paris which reconstructed the "Fédération anarchiste" (FA) on a more broadly based Synthesis anarchism basis, starting with those recently excluded from the federation and former militants who had simply left the old FA during the preceding years, alienated by what they saw as a continuing communist libertarian drift. The basic principals of the reconstructed federation were drawn to try and incorporate the largest number of anarchists, irrespective of the strands within the overall movement to which they adhered. It was in reality a challenging aspiration. Maurice Joyeux who had taken the initiative of setting up a replacement Anarchist Federation, found himself obliged to make compromises with individualistic anarchists which taken in aggregate led to an operating structure that Joyaux himself found "impossible". The requirement that decisions be adopted on a unanimous basis meant that each individual member enjoyed the right to veto any attempt to set a direction for the federation.

=== Last years ===
At the start of the 1970s an infarction obliged Lapeyre to withdraw from active political involvement, and he retired to Barsac, Gironde. He died on 2 May 1991 in a hospital at Burela, following an automobile accident in Galicia (northwest Spain).

== Publications (selection) ==
- Jésus-Christ, Dieu soleil., Bordeaux, Éditions Lucifer & Paris, Groupe de propagande par la brochure, n°131, novembre 1933.
- 6 février 1935, Bordeaux, Éditions Lucifer, 1935.
- Jésus-Christ a-t-il existé ?, Bordeaux, Éditions Lucifer & Groupe de propagande par la brochure, n°167, novembre 1936.
- Ce qu’est le syndicalisme révolutionnaire., Paris, Éditions CGT-SR, mars 1937.
- Révolution et contre-révolution en Espagne : lueurs sur l’Espagne républicaine, février 1938, Paris, Éditions Spartacus & Éditions Terre libre, Nîmes, 1938.
- De Gaulle tout nu, Éditions CNT, 1946.
- with Marc Prévôtel, Cléricalisme moderne et mouvement ouvrier, Volonté anarchiste, 1983, ISSN 0181-4389.
