= Publico bookstore =

French anarchist bookstore

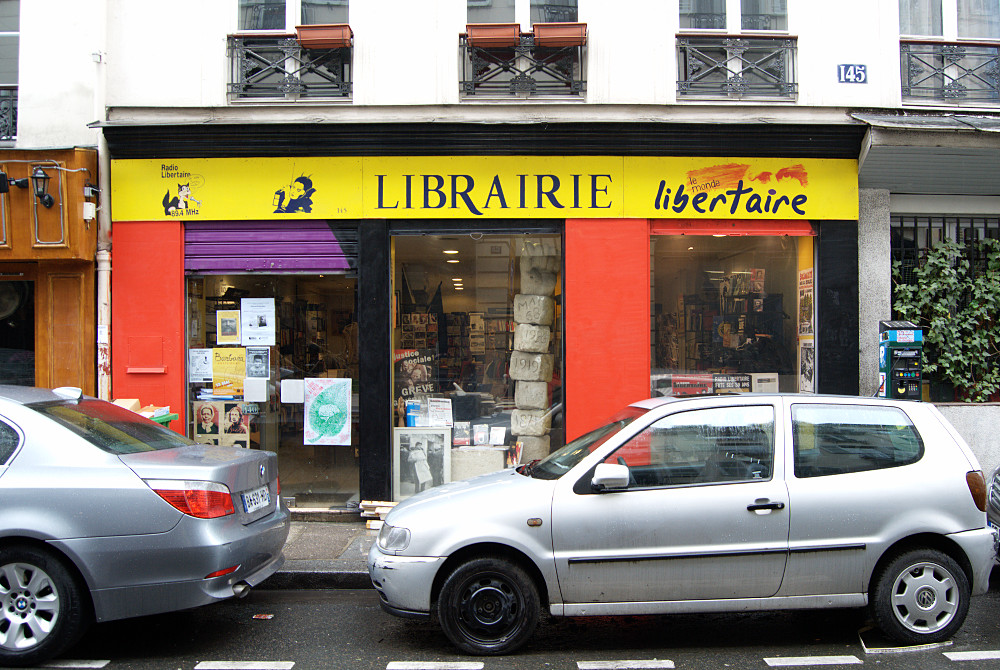
- Publico storefront, 2013
- Founded: 18 March 1959
- Headquarters location: 145 Rue Amelot, Paris
- Fiction genres: Anarchism
- Official website: www.librairie-publico.com

The Publico bookstore (in French: librairie Publico), located at 145 rue Amelot in Paris, is a bookstore and publishing house specializing in works related to anarchism. It was founded on 18 March 1959.

Linked to the Fédération anarchiste (FA), the bookstore serves as a hub for anarchist activity in the French capital and a gathering point for anarchists in France.

== History ==
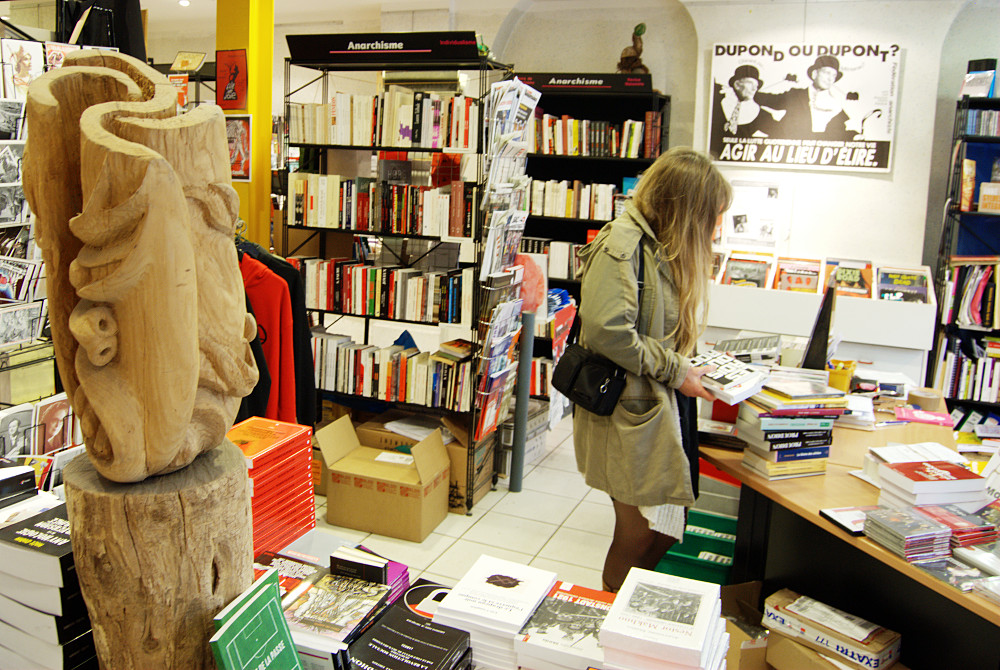
Publico interior, 2013

The bookstore was founded on 18 March 1959 by the Fédération anarchiste (FA), with which it is closely affiliated. It also maintains connections to Radio Libertaire, the FA's radio station. Initially named Librairie du Monde libertaire, it was first located at 3 rue Ternaux before moving to 145 rue Amelot in 1981. The bookstore also functions as a printing press. Alongside Lyon's La Gryffe, it is one of France's two historic anarchist bookstores, though newer anarchist bookstores like Quilombo emerged from the 1990s onward.

The bookstore was targeted by two bombings, one by the colonialist far-right organization OAS in 1962, the other one by Francoists in the middle of the 1970s.

After May 68, the bookstore was managed by the anarchist militant Hellyette Bess. Between 1984 and 1988, Hervé Trinquier, a former manager of Publico, and Jacky-Joël Julien, co-founder of Radio libertaire, took over the Libertarian Theatre of Paris (TLP), basing its headquarters at the bookstore and hosting figures such as Léo Ferré.

In 1988, the bookstore joined the internet. During the Gulf War (1990–1991), the FA, Radio Libertaire, and Publico campaigned against French military involvement. During this period, several anarchists deserting the French army sought assistance at the bookstore, raising concerns among FA and Radio Libertaire members about potential targeting by authorities. The bookstore, however, was overwhelmed and unable to provide substantial support.

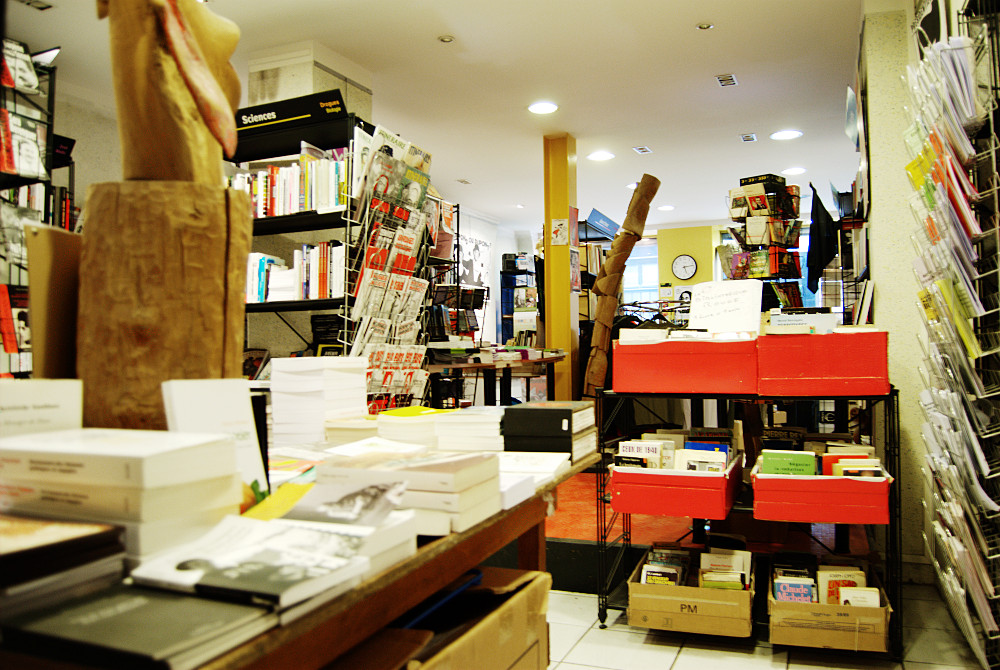
Publico, 2013

On 2 May 2019, the bookstore—already targeted by far-right militants—was attacked. A man in his forties entered the premises, waited for a volunteer to turn away, and stabbed him in the back of the head with a kitchen knife. The blade broke upon impact, leaving a part into the skull of the victim. The injured volunteer was then rushed to the hospital where he ultimately survived. Le Monde libertaire criticized the lack of media coverage, the police investigation's handling, and the refusal to classify the act as terrorism.

In 2020, the bookstore hosted Radio Conchita, a feminist radio station for Spanish expatriates. It also organizes the Libertarian Book Fair (in French: Salon du livre libertaire).

== Editorial focus and publications ==
Publico ‘primarily distributes anarchist works or materials related to anarchism, including audiovisual resources and propaganda (posters, stickers, etc.)'. According to Jesse S. Cohn and Nathan J. Jun, its inclusion of English-language publications reflects a bilingual dynamic within anarchism in France, which can be uncommon in other anarchist movements.

Libertarian geographer Philippe Pelletier described it as a useful resource for engaging with anarchist thought. Arnaud Sagnard remarks that it is a bookstore where the clients often discuss between themselves, which would not be the case in other bookstores.

== Organization ==
The bookstore is staffed by two salaried booksellers, a rarity in anarchist circles in France. Therefore, these are not volunteer militants but rather professional booksellers who choose to work in this field out of anarchist activism, as salaries at the bookstore are lower than in equivalent positions. Adeline de Lépinay notes:

Publico, the Parisian bookstore of the Fédération anarchiste, is run by permanent staff who are supposed to be technical employees. However, on the one hand, they are professional booksellers, hired for their mastery of the trade, who will continue to work as booksellers after leaving Publico. On the other hand, they made a political choice to practice their profession at Publico because the work is demanding and the pay is lower than elsewhere. They are neither technical assistants tasked with monitoring the bookstore during opening hours nor self-sacrificing militants who abandon themselves to serve the cause!

== Bibliography ==
- de Lépinay, Adeline (2021), "Exigence, compétences, pression et coopération au sein d'une boulangerie autogérée" [Demand, skills, pressure and cooperation in a self-managed bakery], Mouvements, 106 (106): 121–129, doi:10.3917/mouv.106.0121
- Patiès, Félix (2022), "Radio Libertaire dans la mobilisation contre la première guerre du Golfe en 1990 – 1991" [Radio Libertaire in the mobilization against the first Gulf War in 1990 – 1991], Revue d’études radiophoniques et sonores, vol. 8, no. 8, pp. 1–15, doi:10.4000/radiomorphoses.3057
- Pucciarelli, Mimo (1999), "Qui sont les anarchistes ?" [Who are the anarchists ?] (PDF), Alternative Libertaire (AL), pp. 1–24
