= Georges Fontenis =

French anarchist (1920–2010)

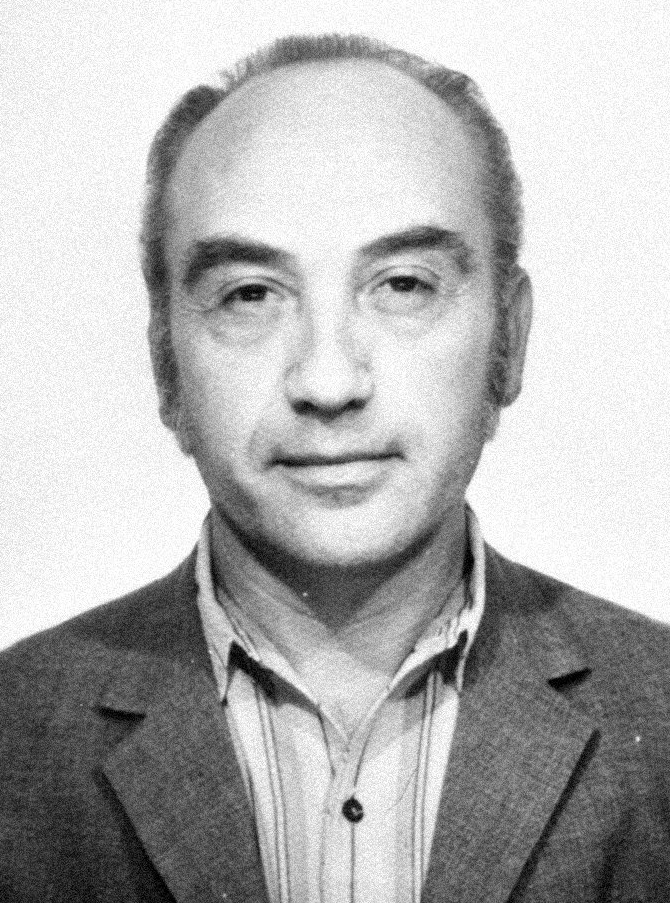
- Born: April 27, 1920; Paris, France
- Died: August 10, 2010 (aged 90); Reignac-sur-Indre, France
- Occupations: Activist, trade unionist, school teacher
- Organization(s): Anarchist Federation; Fédération communiste libertaire Movement communiste libertaire
- Movement: Anarcho-communism

Georges Fontenis (27 April 1920 – 9 August 2010) was a school teacher who worked in Tours. He is more widely remembered on account of his political involvement, especially during the 1950s and 1960s.

An anarcho-communist and trade unionist, he was a leading figure in the anarchist movement in France.

== Life ==
=== Early years ===
Described by one authority as "the son and grandson of militant socialists", Georges Louis Albert Fontenis was born into a working-class family in Paris and grew up in the city's suburbs. As a young teenager he devoured his father's revolutionary socialist and trades union journals and newspapers and other Trotskyist and pacifist literature. He became involved with the libertarian movement during the strikes of June 1936. When he was 17 he joined the Anarchist Union, "discovered" Bakunin and Kropotkin, and started selling Le Libertaire on street corners.

=== Activism and teaching ===
France was invaded by Germany during May/June 1940. Political and trades union activity was banned, with the result that various political organisations, including the Trades Union Confederation ("Confédération générale du travail" / CGT) itself, "went underground", becoming progressively incorporated into the wider French Resistance movement. Fontenis joined the "clandestine CGT", also participating actively in local syndicalist groups. By this time he was working as a primary school teacher in the north-eastern part of Paris. He was also involved after the war with Marcel Pennetier and Maurice Dommanget in a relaunch of another sort of school, the École émancipée, a revolutionary syndicalist grouping of (sometimes) like-minded activists.

After the teachers' strike in the Seine department in November–December 1947 Georges Fontenis briefly joined the National Labour Confederation ("Confédération nationale du travail" / CNT-F), but then returned to the more mainstream National [primary] teachers' union ("Syndicat national des instituteurs" / SNI) in which he continued to press the militant agenda of École émancipée. After he was arrested by the security services and his sentencing in 1957, which was part of a broader crack-down on the anarchist movement, he was reinstated into the teaching profession in 1958 and enrolled at the École normale supérieure de Saint-Cloud, a large primary school in the western part of Paris. He became a primary schools inspector in a rural zone between 1962 and 1967 and then, in September 1967, a teacher of Psychopedagogy at the teachers' training academy in Tours.

=== Secretary General of the Anarchist Federation (France) ===
After the war ended Georges Fontenis was one of the founders of the Anarchist Federation. Others included Robert Joulin, Henri Bouyé, Maurice Joyeux, Suzy Chevet, Renée Lamberet, Georges Vincey, Aristide and Paul Lapeyre, Maurice Laisant, Maurice Fayolle, Giliana Berneri, Solange Dumont, Roger Caron, Henri Oriol et Paul Chery. Over the next few years his life was closely aligned with that of the libertarian movement till 1957. That was the year in which he was arrested by the security services because of his support for Algerian separatists.

In 1946 he was elected secretary general of the Anarchist Federation. For many in the movement his was a relatively new face which made it easier for him to find consensus because he was not a member of any existing faction. In reality, however, Anarcho-communist and Individualist anarchist tendencies did not sit comfortably with the federation's priorities. The individualist anarchists, led by the Lapeyre brothers and Jean-René Saulière, organised a "letter-writing lobby". As Maurice Joyeux put it, "It was not really a structured group intended to exclude those who thought differently from them from the Anarchist Federation, but a network of letter-writing across the country which led to an identical set of results. Which is to say they pre-primed the congress in respect of the proposals they set out, outside the congress meeting".

In 1948 George Fontenis teamed up with a group of exiled CNT and FAI militants to attempt the assassination of General Franco. The plan involved purchasing an aircraft, which could not be done successfully by a Spanish passport holder. Fontenis provided his name and nationality for the purchase of a small aeroplane, intended to be used to bomb a pleasure boat occupied by the "Caudillo" in San Sebastián Bay. The attempt failed. In February 1951 Fontenis was briefly arrested in connection with the affair, but soon released because alleged (but fictitious) links to the plotters could not be demonstrated.

=== Libertarian Communist Federation ("Fédération communiste libertaire") ===
At the start of 1950 a group of militants around Serge Ninn and Georges Fontenis set about establishing a communist libertarian group - described by Maurice Joyeux as a "clandestine party inside the Anarchist Federation", and by another commenter as "a kind of secret ginger group" - which they called the Organisation of Battle Planning ("Organisation Pensée Bataille" / OPB), as a tribute to Camillo Berneri and his 1936 book "Pensée et bataille". OPB members decided to keep their organisation's existence secret. In May/June 1952, at the Anarchist Federation congress at Bordeaux, they moved to expel the Lapeyre brothers, Maurice Joyeux and Maurice Fayolle. The bitterness engendered and Georges Fontenis' centrality to the acrimonious affair meant that for many years afterwards he would be singled out for demonisation in the speeches and writings of traditionally more mainstream anarchists.

At the congress in Paris in May 1953 the libertarian communist faction prevailed. The congress adopted the "Declaration of Principles" project which asserted the libertarian communist objectives of the organisation. Unable to agree on a new name for the relaunched organisation at the time, it was only after a members' referendum in December 1953 that the French "Anarchist Federation" became the "Libertarian Communist Federation", with 11 of the 16 regional groups (comprising between 130 and 160 individual activists) under the direction of the OPB. The Individualist anarchists and some of the communist libertarians regrouped separately around Maurice Joyeux who had found the tactics adopted by the OPB unacceptable, and set about creating a new "breakaway" Anarchist Federation.

It was also in 1953 that George Fontenis wrote "Manifesto of libertarian communism - essential problems", which has been described variously as "Leninist", "avant gardist" and/or "Bolschevist". In August 1954 the "Kronstadt" libertarian-communist group published a memorandum condemning the secretive structure and the Leninism of the wider "Libertarian Communist Federation", and were, in 1955, expelled. During 1954 Fontenis himself had increasingly diverted his focus and that of the federation to political and "logistical" support for the "Algerian insurrection".

In January 1956 the Libertarian Communist Federation submitted a list of ten "revolutionary candidates" for the national legislative elections. Georges Fontenis was one. The next year the Libertarian Communist Federation was destroyed by state authorities. Several leading figures in it were arrested and detained as part of an attack on the survival of the "Poujadist Movement". Georges Fontenis was one. The next year he was released as part of a wider amnesty enacted by President de Gaulle. There followed a dozen years during which very little was heard either of the libertarian communist movement or of Georges Fontenis.

=== After the "May '68 events" ===
In 1968 Fontenis was a co-founder of the Libertarian Communist Movement (Mouvement communiste libertaire, MCL) which shortly afterwards became the Libertarian Communist Organisation (Organisation communiste libertaire, OCL) but then, in the words of one source, "with the growth of a widespread social apathy in the years following 1974", was dissolved in 1976.

In 1979 he joined the Union of Libertarian Communist Workers (French: Union des travailleurs communistes libertaires, UTCL). Georges Fontenis remained a member of the successor organisation, "Alternative libertaire", but in his later years he wrote less and less. He died at his home in Reignac-sur-Indre (a little to the south-east of Tours) on 9 August 2010.

In 1990 he issued his memoirs under the title L'Autre communisme, histoire subversive du mouvement libertaire (The other communism: a subversive history of the Libertarian Movement). An expanded and re-edited version appeared in 2000, something that happened again in 2008. The title changed, too, becoming Changer le monde, histoire du mouvement communiste libertaire (1945-1997) (Changing the world: A history of the Communist Libertarian Movement (1945-1997)).

== Works (selection) ==
- Manifeste du communisme libertaire, Problèmes essentiels, 1953, Éditions L, 1985.
- L'autre communisme : histoire subversive du mouvement libertaire, Éditions Acratie, 1990.
- Changer le monde : histoire du mouvement communiste libertaire, 1945-1997, Éditions Le Coquelicot/Alternative libertaire, 2000.
- with Gilbert Estève, Non-conforme, Édition Bénévent, 2002.
- with André Marty, Claude Bourdet, Daniel Guérin, Jacques Danos, Un homme, une cause, Pierre Morain un prisonnier d’État, 1956.
