= May Picqueray =

French journalist and writer (1898–1983)

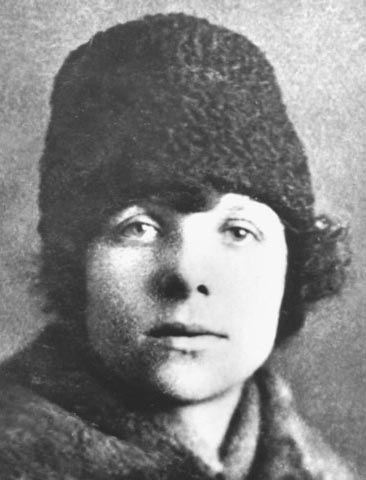
- Born: 8 July 1898; Savenay
- Died: 3 November 1983 (aged 85); Paris
- Known for: Anarchist activism and anti-militarism, May 1968 protests

Marie Jeanne "May" Picqueray (8 July 1898, Savenay – 3 November 1983, 14th arrondissement of Paris) was a French anarchist activist, trade unionist, and notable anti-militarist. She published the pacifist and anti-militarist periodical Le Réfractaire from 1974 to 1983.

== Biography ==
In 1921, two anarchists of Italian origin, Nicola Sacco and Bartolomeo Vanzetti, were condemned to death by the American justice system, while shouting their innocence. Despite the mobilization of the left-wing circles, the French press remained silent. To trigger the press campaign, May Picqueray sent a parcel bomb containing a defensive grenade and leaflets to the American embassy. This "initiative" succeeded in mobilizing the journalists, without causing any damage other than material. Despite the magnitude of the worldwide demonstrations in their favor, Sacco and Vanzetti were executed in 1927 - and rehabilitated in 1978.

Attracted in her youth to revolutionary circles, May Picqueray left France for Moscow, Russia, in 1922, as a delegate of the Metalworkers union, which was at the time part of the Red Trade Union International. While she was in Moscow, she notably climbed on the table to denounce union congregants eating while the common people starved. She also visited Vladimir Lenin, who was already weakened by the disease that eventually killed him. Because of Leon Trotsky's responsibility in the crushing of the Kronstadt rebellion, and his perceived betrayal of Nestor Makhno, she refused to shake his hand when she met him, even as she asked him to release the anarchists locked in prison by the Bolsheviks.

In 1924, she made the punch at the meeting of the Grange-aux-Belles during which the communists killed two anarchist workers with revolvers. Her friendship with Emma Goldman and Alexander Berkman as well as her trip to the USSR confirmed the dictatorial character of the communist regime, even though Stalin was not yet at the head of the country.

Picqueray joined the "Spanish Children's Aid Committee" where her activity consisted of transporting Spanish orphans and reuniting the scattered family members separated by the Spanish war. She was in Toulouse at the time of the Debacle where she was in charge of welcoming refugees. Then she was in charge of supplying the French concentration camps of Noé and Vernet, from where she managed to escape nine internees. Her resistance activity consisted mainly in making false papers, in association with Renée Lamberet and Madeleine Lamberet, for all those who needed them.

A feminist before her time, May Picqueray lived as an independent woman without depriving herself of having a family. She therefore raised her three children, born of three different fathers, alone. Married in Saint-Nazaire on 22 July 1916, to Fred Schneyder, of Dutch nationality, she separated three weeks later. In 1923, she gave birth to a daughter, Sonia, conceived during her trip to the Soviet Union with Lucien Chevalier, federal secretary of the Metal Federation. Then in August 1930, she married François Niel and had a son, Lucien. Finally, in 1941, in the midst of the war, she gave birth to a daughter, Marie-May, whom she conceived with Isaac Gilman, a Belarusian Jew who had taken refuge in Toulouse.

A friend of Louis Lecoin, she was associated with all his struggles and continued her life as an activist after his death.

An enthusiastic participant in the uprising of May 1968, she participated in anti-nuclear campaigns and supported conscientious objectors and those who were resistant to military service.

=== Professional life ===
May Picqueray was one of the figures of the proofreaders' union. She was a proofreader at Ce Soir, Libération and for twenty years at Le Canard enchaîné.

=== Le Réfractaire ===
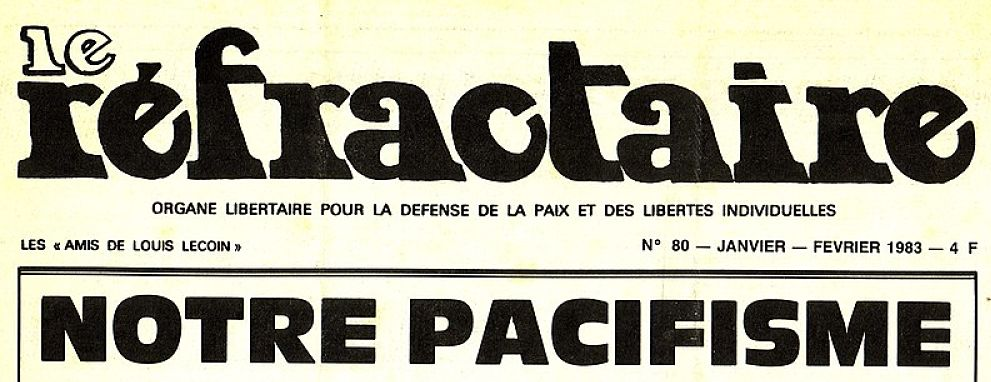

An important figure in the French anarchist milieu, May Picqueray was the founder of the newspaper Le Réfractaire ("Libertarian organ for the defense of peace and individual freedoms"), which she published monthly from 1 April 1974, until her death on 2 November 1983. She was supported in her endeavours by many young conscientious objectors, artists, and designers.

=== Tributes ===
Since 2015, a garden pays tribute to her, at 94, boulevard Richard-Lenoir, the May-Picqueray garden in the 11th arrondissement of Paris.
