= Georg K. Glaser =

French writer (1910–1995)

- Glaser circa 1950
- Born: Georg Glaser; 30 May 1910; Guntersblum, Grand Duchy of Hesse, Germany
- Died: 18 January 1995; Paris
- Occupations: Writer; Coppersmith; Silversmith
- Political party: KPD
- Spouse: Anne
- Parent(s): & Katharina Glaser
The Thinking Hand
- Die Denkende Hand (German)
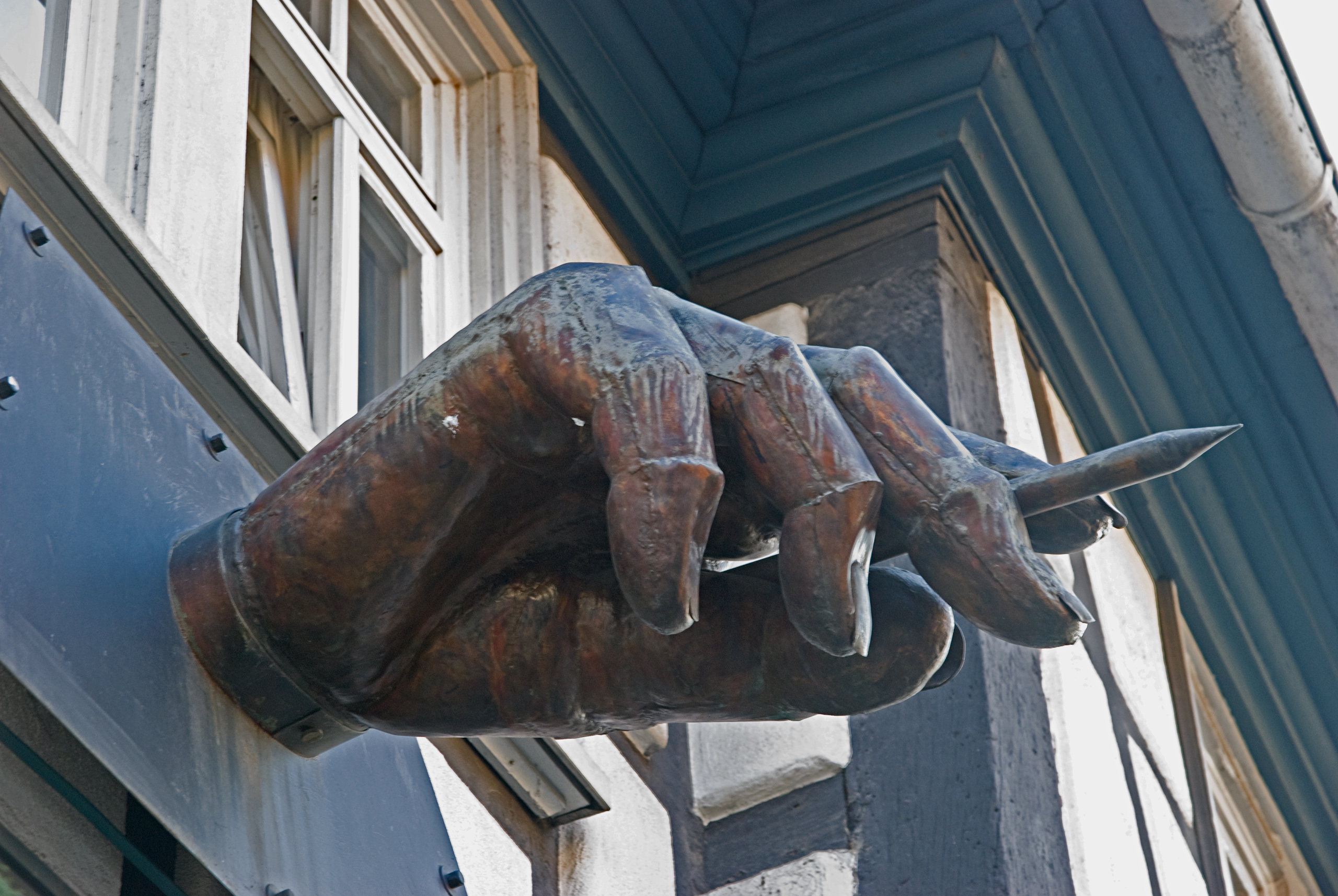
- Artist: Georg K. Glaser
- Medium: Copper
- Location: Höchst, Frankfurt am Main, Germany

Georg K. Glaser (30 May 1910 – 18 January 1995) was a German language and Francophone writer, left wing activist and coppersmith. He was born in Germany, but by the time he died he had acquired French citizenship through marriage, and he lived in France for most of his life.

== Life ==
Georg Glaser was born ten years into the twentieth century in Guntersblum, a small town in the wine growing region to the south of Mainz: he grew up in nearby Dolgesheim. Georg was one of his parents' eight recorded children. At the time of his birth his father worked as a craftsman/boilermaker, but after the war took a job with the post office. Georg's childhood was marked by the violent and authoritarian temperament of his father, and he left home as a teenager. The boy fell foul of the law fairly early on, and after leaving middle school he attended a "correction institute" between 1926 and 1929. During the later 1920s he spent some time living on the streets and frequently ran away from the institutions in which he was placed, preferring the company of young communists, anarchists or naturists. Although he was able to connect with members of relevant organisations, he later insisted that he had remained on the side-lines rather than becoming a member "as such". Nevertheless, sources indicate that he joined the Communist Party in 1929.

In 1929 he was arrested again, for breach of the peace, and during 1930 he spent time in prison for knocking out a policeman during the course of a demonstration. He later stated that it had been in prison at this time that he started to write. He wrote court reports for Communist Party publications and also had sketches, opinion pieces and reports published in mainstream newspapers including the Frankfurter Zeitung. He was at the same time undertaking industrial work in various factories during the early 1930s.

Germany underwent significant regime change in January 1933 when the NDSDAP (Nazi Party) took power, and lost little time in imposing Germany's first twentieth century one- party dictatorship. Glaser participated in small clandestine resistance groups for about a year, before relocating to the Saarland, a part of Germany still under French military and political control, following terms imposed at the end of the war in 1919. The first question he encountered from local Communists in the Saarland was the standard one: "Comrade, do you have permission or an order from your regional [Communist Party] leadership to come here?" There was at this time growing pressure from the new German government for the Saarland to be returned to Germany, and the German position enjoyed increasingly unambiguous support from the British and US governments. From the Saarland Glaser moved on to Paris, which had become a focus for German Communists fleeing from Germany, where their party political activities were now illegal. In Paris he worked on several newspapers produced by exiled anti-Nazi German left-wingers. In 1935 he returned to the Saarland which by now was being returned to German control following the January referendum. He was arrested, but later in the year was able to return to France. He now settled not in Paris but in Normandy where he found a job in an SNCF (railway) workshop. He fell in love with and married a French woman: his civil status changed from that of a German refugee to that of a French citizen. He had already, by this stage, been stripped of his German citizenship. Shortly after this, as rumours of Stalin's atrocities became harder to ignore, and appalled by news of the Treaty concluded between Hitler's Germany and the "Communist" Soviet Union in August 1939 ahead of another Polish partition, Glaser resigned his Communist Party membership.

War resumed at the beginning of September 1939: nine days later Georg Glaser was called up for military service in the French army. His fellow soldiers knew of his German origins which in the atmosphere of the times made for a very uneasy form of comradeship. In 1940 he was taken prisoner by the Germans. By now he was sufficiently fluent in French, and with the help of a false name, to avoid identification as a German Communist. He spent most of the balance of the war in a succession of prisons and prisoner camps. In 1943 he managed to escape from a prison camp near Görlitz, but was captured again a few months later near Strasbourg. The period 1920–1945, covering George Glaser's eventful adolescence and early adulthood in France and Germany, are recalled in his book, "Geheimnis und Gewalt" (Secret et Violence / Secret and Violence), which first appeared in German in 1953 and has appeared in updated editions and in other languages subsequently.

War ended in May 1945 and Glaser returned home to France. He became a member of the recently formed Anarchist Federation. He involved himself in the aftermath of the "Sacco and Vanzetti" affair, during the course of which he met fellow activists Giliana Berneri and the leading libertarian André Prudhommeaux. He supported himself by working, briefly, in a sugar factory, and then, till 1949 on the production lines at the Renault Billancourt plant. He later confided that by the end of the 1940s he had concluded that work on the assembly line had become soul-destroying.

In 1949 he set up a workshop for copper and silver work in the Saint-Germain-des-Prés Left bank quarter of central Paris. In 1968 he moved with his family to the Le Marais quarter, still in central Paris, but no longer part of the "Rive Gauche". In the meantime he added the central initial "K." to his full name. Sources differ as to why, but it was probably to honour his recently deceased mother, whose middle name had been "Katharina". Despite abandoning the left-wing militancy of his former years, he retained numerous friends among the "Libertaires."

== The writer ==
Much of Glaser's published output was autobiographical. In the early 1930s he was producing proletarian-revolutionary writing, true to Communist Party orthodoxy. During his exile in the middle and later 1930s he became more distant from Communist ideology and returned increasingly to the anarchist principles that had influenced his teenage years.

His major work, "Geheimnis und Gewalt" (Secret et Violence / Secret and Violence), appeared in the early 1950s. It was written in German but was initially accessible only, in translation, to French readers because a German publisher for it could not be found. It received some critical support, but early editions failed to win a wide readership, partly because of the chaotic circumstances surrounding its publication, with early editions crudely edited and marred by typographical errors.

== Recognition ==
During the closing years of the twentieth century Georg K Glaser was rediscovered as a writer for a wider audience, and his literary output became relatively mainstream. Since 1998 the "Rhein-Pfalz" Ministry for Education and Culture in the region of his birth has celebrated his literary contribution with the annually awarded Georg K. Glaser Prize. The prize, which is also supported by the powerful regional television operator Südwestrundfunk, is worth €10,000 to the winner.

== See also ==
- Anarchism in Germany
