= Berneri =

Berneri is a surname. Notable people with the surname include:

- Anahí Berneri (born 1975), Argentine director and movie producer
- Camillo Berneri (1877–1937), Italian professor
- Giliana Berneri (1919–1998), French libertarian communist activist
- Giovanna Berneri (1897–1962), educationalist and militant libertarian anarchist
- Marie-Louise Berneri (1918–1949), Italian anarchist
