= André Prudhommeaux =

French anarchist (1902–1968)

- Born: 15 October 1902; Guise, France
- Died: 13 November 1968 (aged 66); Versailles, France

André Prudhommeaux (15 October 1902 – 13 November 1968) was a French anarchist bookstore owner whose shop in Paris specialized in social history and was a place for many debates and discussions. He was an agronomist, libertarian, editor of Le Libertaire and Le Monde Libertaire, writer, and journalist.

== Biography ==
André Prudhommeaux was born on 15 October 1902, in the Picard town of Guise, to Jules Prudhommeaux and Marie Dollet, two members of Jean-Baptiste André Godin's co-operative community. His family moved through many cities throughout France, before settling in Paris, where Prudhommeaux studied at the Institut national agronomique Paris Grignon.

By the mid-1920s, Prudhommeaux had joined the Young Communists, his activism with which got him expelled from university. He married fellow communist activist Dori Ris, with whom he opened a book shop and moved towards council communism. In 1930, the couple travelled throughout Germany, meeting members of the Communist Workers' Party of Germany and becoming interested in the Spartacist uprising and Kronstadt rebellion, which marked the beginning of his move towards anarchism.

The following year, he moved to Nîmes, where he opened a new printing co-operative. In the wake of the Reichstag fire, Prudhommeaux mounted a campaign to defend the accused Dutch communist Marinus van der Lubbe. This completed his departure from Marxism and acceptance of anarchism; before long he had joined the Francophone Anarchist Federation and was publishing its newspaper Terre libre, which published appeals for aid for political prisoners in the Soviet Union.

Prudhommeaux visited Barcelona during the Spanish Revolution of 1936 and began publishing L’Espagne antifasciste following his return, which he edited simultaneously with Terre libre. Along with Volin, he opposed the CNT-FAI's collaboration with the Spanish Republican government. As World War II approached, he worried that the anarchist movement was rapidly losing ground. During the Nazi occupation of France, Prudhommeaux lived in exile in Switzerland, where he became friends with Luigi Bertoni and contributed to the journal Témoins.

After the war, Prudhommeaux and his family moved to Versailles, where he began editing Le Libertaire and worked to reestablish international relations between anarchist groups in different countries. He also wrote for Preuves during this time. He was one of the first to be alarmed by the rise of Georges Fontenis' platformist tendency within the Francophone Anarchist Federation, going on to found a new Anarchist Federation outside of Fontenis' influence.

Throughout the 1950s, Prudhommeaux contributed to numerous different anarchist publications and concerned himself deeply with the situation in the Eastern Bloc. In 1960, he began to suffer from Parkinson's disease; Prudhommeaux died from this illness on 13 November 1968. His archives were collected by the Centre International de Recherches sur l'Anarchisme and the International Institute of Social History.

== Bibliography ==
- Jacquier, Charles (September 1996). "Andre Prudhommeaux". KSL: Bulletin of the Kate Sharpley Library. No. 6. Translated by Sharkey, Paul. ISSN 1475-0309.
- Jacquier, Charles (9 March 2014). "Prudhommeaux, André Jean Eugène [aka Jean Cello, André Prunier]". Dictionnaire des anarchistes – via Kate Sharpley Library.
- Porter, David Lewis (2021). "André Prudhommeaux, Algeria and National Liberation". Anarchist Studies. 29 (1): 39–56. ISSN 0967-3393.
