= Quilombo bookstore =

- Founded: 2002
- Headquarters location: 23 rue Voltaire, Paris
- Key people: Bastien Roche (2006-2019)
- Nonfiction topics: Anarchism, radical ecology, alter-globalization
- Official website: https://librairie-quilombo.org/

The Quilombo bookstore is an anarchist bookstore and publishing house located at 23 rue Voltaire in Paris.

Founded in 2002 by members of the Section carrément anti-Le Pen (SCALP), it is linked to the L'Échappée publishing house. It distributes texts concerning anarchism and broader social struggles, with a focus on alter-globalization and radical ecology.

The bookstore also supports the Palestinian cause and the Zapatista movement.

== History ==
The bookstore was founded in 2002 at 23 Rue Voltaire in the 11th arrondissement of Paris. Its name, Quilombo, refers to the communities formed by escaped slaves.

It was launched by several members of the Section carrément anti-Le Pen (SCALP). The bookstore is part of a cluster of activist networks in Paris, including the adjacent International Center for Popular Culture (CICP) and the headquarters of the Confédération nationale du Travail (CNT) at 33 Rue des Vignoles.

The initiative was reportedly launched with less than 4,000 euros. However, Quilombo was able to hire one, and later two, employees during the 2000s. One of them was Bastien Roche (1980–2021), a CNT member with ties to the Zapatistas, whom he visited and with whom he built connections.

In 2015, the bookstore underwent expansion work for several days.

After being closed, Quilombo reopened in April 2020 during the COVID-19 pandemic, stating 'so that thought is no longer confined'.

In 2024, the bookstore published a statement in Le Monde libertaire announcing the end of their 6,000 annual catalogs due to rising paper prices and postal costs.

== Editorial policy, publications, and specificities ==
Quilombo is self-managed according to anarchist principles and holds a general assembly every two months so that those involved in the project can collectively make decisions.

According to sociologist Benjamin Ferron, the bookstore is closely aligned with the Zapatista, Palestinian, and alter-globalization movements in France. In 2012, he wrote:

This bookstore works closely with the Committee of Solidarity with the Peoples of Chiapas in Struggle (CSPLCL), whose office is located in the CICP, on the same floor and right next door to the Association France-Palestine Solidarité (AFPS).

It is also 'closely linked' to the publishing houses L'Échappée and Nada, with members of these houses actively participating in the bookstore.

While the bookstore is interested in all types of publications concerning anarchism and broader social struggles, it has undergone a progressive evolution, leading it to approach anarchist thought through subjects such as radical ecology and the critique of industrial society.

== Legacy ==
=== Influence on the anarchist publishing and movement in France ===
Alongside Publico and La Brèche, it is part of a network of anarchist bookstores that have enabled an 'editorial flowering' of anarchist texts (or those concerning anarchism) in the early 21st-century France. As of 2024, approximately fifty independent publishing houses reportedly rely financially on the bookstore for their distribution.
