= Georges Malkine =

French painter

Georges Malkine

Georges Alexandre Malkine (10 October 1898 – 22 March 1970) was the only visual artist named in André Breton's 1924 Surrealist Manifesto among those who, at the time of its publication, had “performed acts of absolute surrealism." The rest Breton named were for the most part writers, including Louis Aragon, Robert Desnos, and Benjamin Peret. Malkine's 1926 painting Nuit D'amour was the precursor of the lyrical abstract school of painting.

- "He has pushed individualism to the point of impertinence! But what art in his expression of the ineffable whenever he took the pains to do so!" — André Breton
- "Georges Malkine has left his delicate mark on the window of time, made as with a diamond, without altering its transparence, without blurring the view, leaving the purest trace that can only be discerned from a certain angle and in a certain light." — Patrick Waldberg (1970)

== Life ==
Georges Malkine chose not to expose his private life and, apart from his career in film and theatre, his work was known only to his collectors. He avoided social gatherings, as well as group meetings and anthologies and other methods of categorizing (and, to his mind, demeaning) artists. His example, as suggested in the above quote by Breton, championed the concept of individualism. In his 1970 monograph of Malkine, Patrick Waldberg (French art historian) wrote, "[Malkine] is perhaps the only artist about whom it can be said that through his life and his work, reality and dreams may cease to be viewed contrarily." Indeed, Malkine lived Surrealism and eschewed all attachments to fame, money, career, and other things that he felt sought to confine, define, and in the end, confuse the real issues. He believed a man's wealth was contained in the inner landscapes, and didn't like to talk publicly about himself; his paintings were the only personal glimpses he provided for those who might be interested.

Georges Malkine had a musical soul, and especially loved the piano, which appears in many of his paintings. His highest love was for poetry. Among his closest friends were the poets Robert Desnos and Louis Aragon. Upon Malkine's death, Aragon wrote a lengthy poetic tribute to Malkine, published in his magazine Les lettres françaises. Penelope Rosemont has erroneously suggested that Malkine was homosexual based on a Man Ray photograph of him kissing his first wife, Yvette, who wore her hair short like a man's. This 1930 photo, in addition to Malkine and his wife, included André de la Rivière, Robert Desnos, and the Swiss sculptor André Lasserre.

After the Second World War Malkine married Sonia Malkine who later became a folk singer. In 1948, the couple emigrated together to the United States. They first lived in Brooklyn and later settled in Woodstock, New York, where Malkine began to paint again.

== Work ==
Malkine's work spans the years from the early 1920s right up until his death in 1970. He painted approximately 500 pieces in his lifetime, and did some writing and illustrating. He had seven solo shows, with five more after his death; he contributed to 37 collective shows (19 posthumously). He won the William and Norma Copley Foundation Award in 1966. His records and reports from other sources show his periods of greatest activity as being the 1920s, early 1930s, and the 1960s. His output is remarkable in that it ended with a period of productivity that was just as notable as the early period. He embarked in 1966 on his Demeures, or Dwellings, a series of metaphorical portraits of great artists from many disciplines, presented in the form of buildings reflecting Malkine's perception of their character or work.

Malkine was not devoted uniquely to the art of painting; between the years 1933–1939, he acted in 20 films, working with, among others, Jean Gabin, Billy Wilder, and Michèle Morgan. In 1950 he wrote a farcical novel, A bord du violin de mer, including many illustrations by Malkine. It was published posthumously.

== Selected exhibitions ==
A retrospective of Malkine's early and late paintings opened at the Galerie Les Yeux Fertiles in Paris in June 2004. Two major shows in 1999 contained paintings and drawings by Malkine, from both his late and early periods. The Surrealism: Two Private Eyes exhibit at the Solomon R. Guggenheim Museum in New York City, taken from the immense Surrealist art collections of Daniel Filipacchi and Nesuhi Ertegün, included a four-painting array and one drawing. The other show,Georges Malkine: Le Vagabond du Surréalisme, was a four-month retrospective at the Pavillon des Arts in Paris. It was the most complete Malkine retrospective to date. Five paintings were shown in Paris in 1995 in a collector's show at the Musée d'Art Moderne de la Ville de Paris, titled Passions Privées. His paintings come up for auction periodically throughout Europe, and are in collections throughout the world. A retrospective exhibition, Georges Malkine: Perfect Surrealist Behavior, ran from October 2014 to January 2015 at the Woodstock Artists Association & Museum in Woodstock N. Y. The catalogue to the exhibition includes an 8-chapter monograph and is the first book-length publication on Malkine in English.

== Filmography ==
- L'Ange gardien (1933)
- Mauvaise graine (1934) The secretary.
- L'Or (1934) Zorloff.
- Love, Death and the Devil (1934) Vikhom.
- The Devil in the Bottle (1935) Vikhom.
- The First Offence (1936)
- Un de la légion (1936) The Russian legionnaire.
- La Dame de Malacca (1937) A guard.
- La Tragédie impériale (1938) Beggar.
- S.O.S. Sahara (1938) Ivan.
- Le Joueur (1938)
- Le Corsaire (1939)
- Behind the Facade (1939) The taxi driver.
- Midnight Tradition (1939) A gangster.
- La Loi du nord (1939)
- Pièges (1939)
- Eine kleine Nachtmusik (1940)
- Les Musiciens du ciel (1940)
- Remorques (1941) Un marin.
