= Madeleine Lamberet =

French artist (1908–1999)

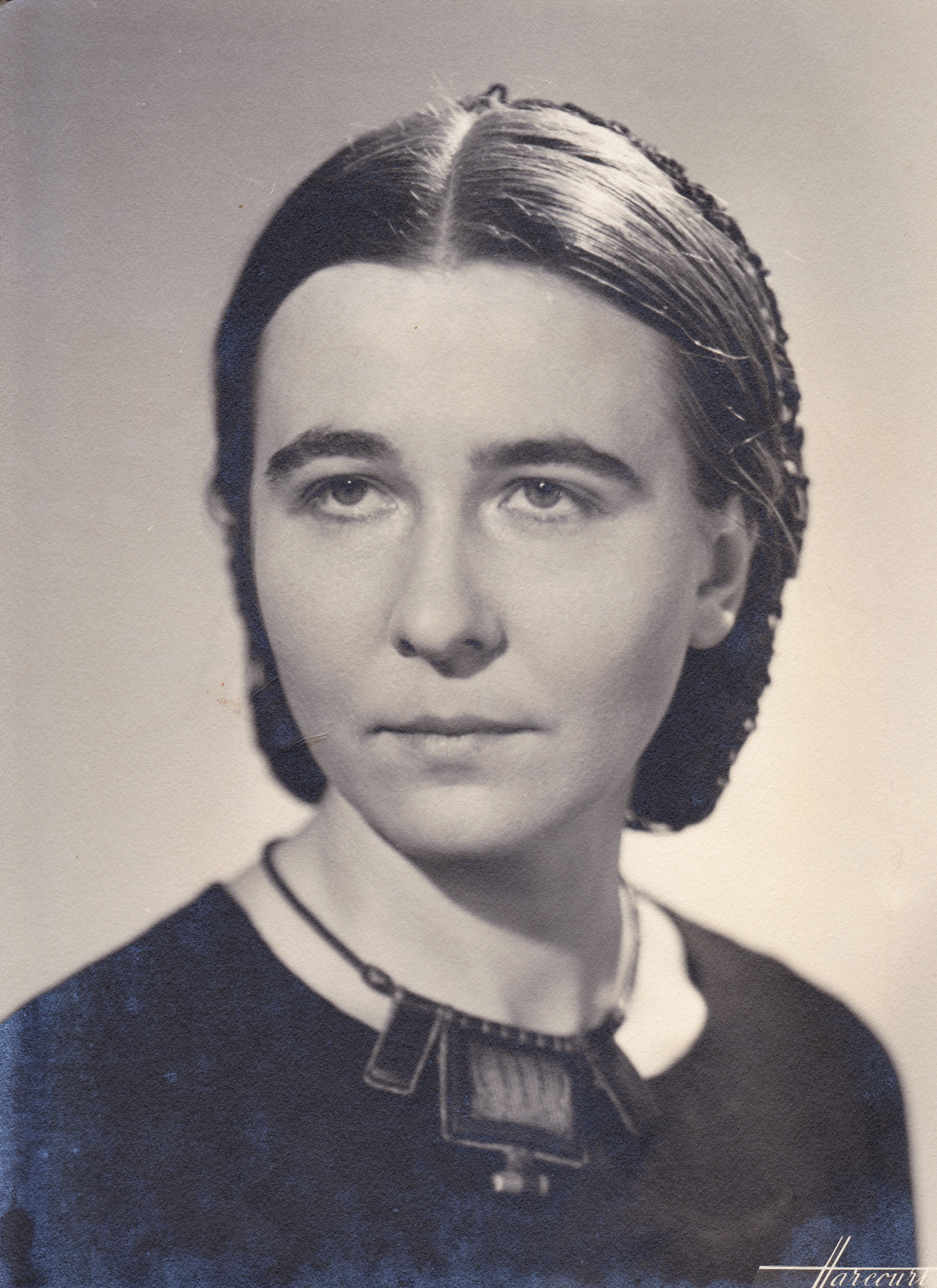
- Madeleine Lamberet (1930)
- Born: 6 March 1908; Villeneuve-Saint-Georges, Paris, France
- Died: 9 May 1999 (aged 91); 18th arrondissement of Paris, France
- Occupation(s): Painter, engraver, teacher
- Partner: Georges Balkanski
- Relatives: Renée Lamberet (sister)

Madeleine Lamberet (6 March 1908 - 9 May 1999) was a French artist, primary school teacher and anarchist activist.

== Biography ==
Madeleine Lamberet was born on 6 March 1908, in the Parisian suburb of Villeneuve-Saint-Georges. An artist from an early age, she studied at the École des Arts Décoratifs and was an apprentice to the neo-impressionist painters Maurice Denis, Paul Signac and Édouard Vuillard. After exhibiting her first works at the 1929 Salon d'Automne, she went to Andorra, where she painted portraits and landscapes. In 1934, she won the Prix Blumenthal for painting.

After the outbreak of the Spanish Civil War, she and her sister Renée Lamberet crossed the border into Spain, where Madeleine took sketches of anarchist militiamen and Renée collected testimonies for her history of the conflict. She was involved with the activities of Solidaridad Internacional Antifascista and wrote articles about the Spanish Revolution for Le Libertaire. In 1937, Madeleine moved to Barcelona, where she painted a series of portraits of anarchist militiamen; she then returned to Paris, where she worked as an art teacher at a primary school. After the defeat of the Spanish Republicans in 1939, she went to the France-Spain border and provided aid to refugees, depicting the internment camps in her drawings. During the Nazi occupation of France, she helped hide members of the French Resistance by engaging in the forgery of documents.

Following the end of World War II, Lamberet travelled to Bulgaria in order to help Bulgarian anarchists flee repression by the communist government. There she met her life-long partner Georges Balkanski, who she helped escape to France in 1949. She became closely involved in the activities of the exiled Spanish and Bulgarian anarchist movements, through which she joined the Confédération Nationale du Travail (CNT), the French branch of the International Workers' Association (IWA). She donated a number of paintings to the CNT, during their labour disputes in the 1970s. The CNT helped put together an exhibition of her drawings in June 1998.

Lamberet continued her work as an art teacher until 1969, when she retired. Her sister Renée died in 1980, and her partner Georges Balkanski died in October 1996. Madeleine Lamberet herself died on 9 May 1999, in the 18th arrondissement of Paris. Her body was cremated on 14 May 1999.

== Bibliography ==
- Dupuy, Rolf (11 September 2011). "LAMBERET Madeleine". Dictionnaire des anarchistes.
- Espílez Murciano, Felipe (2 May 2021). "Madeleine Lamberet". Encima de la niebla (in Spanish). ISSN 2695-5245.
