= Nelly Trumel =

French painter and radio host (1938-2018)

- Born: Nelly Pauline Suzanne Campo; 12 August 1938; 12th arrondissement of Paris, France
- Died: 3 December 2018 (aged 80); Toulouse, Occitania, France
- Occupations: Painter, radio presenter
- Organization: Anarchist Federation
- Movement: Anarcha-feminism

Nelly Trumel (1938–2018) was a French painter, anarcha-feminist activist and radio presenter.

== Biography ==
Nelly Campo was born in Paris on 12 August 1938. Raised in a Catholic family, she was the daughter of garage owner André Campo and secretary Simone Frenisy. Although she described her father as a "tyrant" who dominated the family, her mother encouraged her to pursue an education. After graduating as a Bachelor of Science from the Lycée Marcelin-Berthelot, she enrolled at the EPF School of Engineering, from which she graduated in 1958.

After leaving school, she got married and gave birth to two children: a son in 1960 and a daughter in 1966. She focused all of her attentions on raising the two, but life as a housewife made her unhappy and her husband was psychologically abusive towards her.

In 1968, Trumel began seeking opportunities to get out of her house. She helped to establish socio-educational centres and joined the Federation of Parents' Councils (French: Fédération des conseils de parents d'élèves; FCPE), which she was involved in until her daughter left school. She briefly joined the Women's Grand Lodge Of France, but left after 3 months. At this time, she also began reading feminist theory, including The Second Sex by Simone de Beauvoir and Little Girls by Elena Gianini Belotti, which greatly influenced her to join the feminist movement.

By the 1970s, Trumel had also decided to take up painting and taught herself by working as a copyist at the Louvre. Her husband resented her new-found autonomy, but she began to resist him, especially after she started psychoanalysis in 1973, which helped her realise that she was being abused.

She divorced her husband in 1975 and immediately set to work as a painter, selling copies of her work in order to pay for her daughter's education. She joined the Souffles d'Elles, which published works about her paintings, and was a member of the Société des Artistes Français, among various other cultural associations. She joined the Union of Women Painters and Sculptors in 1988 and remained a member until its dissolution in 1993. Throughout her career, she participated in a number of exhibitions both as part of an association and by herself.

By this time, Trumel was already a committed anarcha-feminist. In 1984, she joined the Anarchist Federation and served on its women's commission. Having listened to Radio Libertaire since she was married, she volunteered her services to the radio station, initially working as a secretary while training as a radio technician. In 1986, on the 50th anniversary of the Spanish Revolution of 1936, Trumel started a new weekly anarcha-feminist radio programme Femmes Libres, named after the Spanish anarcha-feminist organisation Mujeres Libres. Slated for every Wednesday evening, she dedicated her programme to women's struggles and issues, welcoming various women guests onto the show. She also served as the station's secretary of programming from 1989 to 1991.

During this time, she also attended meetings at La Maison des femmes and joined a number of women's organisations such as the Coordination of Associations for the Right to Abortion and Contraception (French: Coordination des associations pour le droit à l'avortement et à la contraception; CADAC), the National Collective for Women's Rights (French: Collectif national pour les droits des femmes; CNDF) and The Watch Dogs (French: Les Chiennes de garde; CDG). She also participated in the World March of Women when it began in 2000. In an interview with the Archives du Feminisme, when asked who her favourite feminist was, she responded "To name one would be to betray the others and establish a hierarchy. Many have given me a lot".

By 1997, Trumel was only hosting Femmes Libres once a fortnight, with other hosts taking over the show during her off-weeks. She again began concentrating on her painting career, focusing on the study of light and still life. Her favourite subjects for still life photos were potatoes that were in the process of sprouting, which she depicted as "a sign of the eternal slavery of women", as well as "weapons to be thrown at the head of one's oppressor".

In 2012, she stopped hosting her radio programme entirely, and in 2013, she retired to Toulouse. Nelly Trumel died on 3 December 2018. Her work, including over 1,600 hours of radio broadcasts, has been collected and digitised by the Centre des Archives du féminisme.

== Bibliography ==
- Charpenel, Marion (2018). "Nelly Trumel (1938-2018)". Archives du féminisme Bulletin (in French) (26): 53–54. ISSN 1765-3371.
- Lenoir, Hugues (23 June 2019) [15 April 2014]. "TRUMEL Nelly, Suzanne, Pauline, née CAMPO". Dictionnaire des anarchistes (in French). Le Maitron.
