= A Short History of Anarchism =

1932 book

- Freedom Press reprint
- Author: Max Nettlau
- Original title: La anarquía a través de los tiempos
- Translator: Ida Pilat Isca
- Language: Spanish
- Subject: History of anarchism
- Publisher: Maucci, Freedom Press
- Publication date: 1935
- English publication date: 1996
- Pages: 349 (Spanish 1st ed.)

A Short History of Anarchism is a history of anarchism by Max Nettlau.

== Contents ==
The book outlines the development of anarchism internationally from 1789 to 1934. It covers individuals, organizations, and periodicals.

== Publication ==
Freedom Press published A Short History of Anarchism in 1996. The text is a translation of Historia de la anarquía (in Spanish), which itself had been edited from La anarquía a través de los tiempos. The original, which translates as "Anarchy in the Course of Time", was published in Barcelona in 1935 by Maucci, summarizing Nettlau's prior German print publications covering 1864–1886. He added six chapters to summarize 1886 to 1935. Nettlau did not finish nevertheless publish his history of anarchism at his death but the book samples from that work. Subsequent translated editions include Swedish (1954), Italian (1964), and French (1971).

== Reception ==
Closer to a biobibliography than an academic history, Nettlau shows intimate knowledge of the anarchist movement and personalities, but is more partisan and passionate in tone than detached and analytical. Revue française de science politique described the book as indispensable for anarchist studies.

== Bibliography ==
- E-J, A (May 23, 1997). "In brief: History (Rev. of A Short History of Anarchism)". Times Literary Supplement (4912): 28. ISSN 0307-661X. OCLC 90361621. Gale EX1200487052 EBSCOhost 9705303328.
- Maitron, Jean (1973). "Bulletin anarchiste 1970–1972". Le Mouvement Social (83): 73–93. doi:10.2307/3807391. ISSN 0027-2671. JSTOR 3807391.
- Paris, Robert (1966). "Review of Brève histoire de l'anarchisme". Le Mouvement social (56): 135–136. doi:10.2307/3777324. ISSN 0027-2671. JSTOR 3777324.
- Walter, Nicolas (October 10, 1997). "A flawless reminder of life left of the left". Times Higher Education Supplement (1301): 27. ISSN 0049-3929. EBSCOhost 9711244014 – via LexisNexis.
