= Noëlla Tricheux =

- Born: 17 October 1906; Havana
- Died: 1988 (aged 81–82); Toulouse
- Parent(s): Paule Tricheux

Noëlla Tricheux (born in Havana on 17 October 1906 and died in Toulouse in 1988) was a French anarchist and anarcho-syndicalist activist. The daughter of Paule and Alphonse Tricheux, both anarchist activists, she followed in their footsteps by engaging in the French anarchist movement.

She accompanied her mother during her experiment in Puigcerdà during the Spanish Civil War. There, both participated in organizing the self-managed commune based on anarchist principles.

== Biography ==
Noëlla Elvire Tricheux was born in Havana on 17 October 1906 to Paule Tricheux and her partner, Alphonse Tricheux. Both were already activists, and the Tricheux family is well known within the French anarchist movement. The family left France for Cuba in 1905, shortly before Noëlla's birth, and returned to France in 1919. Like her mother, Noëlla joined the anarchist group Bien-être et Liberté in Toulouse. She later married Alexandre Durand, another anarcho-syndicalist, and the couple had a son together, Élie Floréal.

In 1936, Noëlla Tricheux traveled to Puigcerdà with her son, her parents, and some of her siblings to take part in the anarchist experiment underway in the city, which was then under the control of the CNT-FAI. She was arrested by communists at the end of this episode, along with the entire Tricheux family, and spent some time in captivity. The entire family was recorded in the files of the French Renseignements généraux (RGs) in 1940.

She died in Toulouse in 1988.
