= Sonia Malkine =

French-American folk singer (1923–2014)

- Malkine on Rainbow Quest (1966)

Background information
- Born: October 7, 1923; Paris, France
- Died: May 31, 2014 (aged 90)
- Genres: French folk music
- Occupations: Singer; radio host
- Instruments: Vocals; lute
- Years active: 1958–1980s
- Label: Folkways Records

Sonia Malkine (October 7, 1923 – May 31, 2014) was a French-American folk singer. She sang the regional folk songs of France, accompanying herself on the lute, and recorded two albums for Folkways Records.

As a teenager she joined the French Resistance, serving as a courier in the Dordogne and then as a liaison agent with the Spanish republican guerrillas, and she crossed into Spain with them in October 1944.

After the war, she settled in Woodstock, New York, hosted folk-music programs on radio and television, and appeared on Pete Seeger's series Rainbow Quest.

== Early life ==
Malkine was born in Paris on October 7, 1923, the daughter of the French anarchist militant May Picqueray. Her obituary gives her name before marriage as Niel, the surname of the Saint-Tropez fisherman François Félix Niel, whom Picqueray married in August 1930 and divorced in 1937.

She lived in Paris until she was three, when her mother took her south, and spent about twelve years at Saint-Tropez. The family returned to Paris a year before the war began. Malkine sat her final school examinations days before the Germans entered the city in 1940 and never learned her results, because the papers were lost when the school was evacuated.

== World War II ==
Malkine left school and took work as a typist for a Paris typewriter dealer who supported collaboration. When he ordered her to type leaflets criticizing the Allies she refused, and after realizing that she was being followed she obtained travel papers from a friend. At eighteen she left the occupied city at night.

She went to the Dordogne in south-western France, where the foreman of a sawmill introduced her to Spanish republican exiles who were being reorganized into guerrilla units alongside the French Resistance. Malkine became a courier, moving papers, reports and money by bicycle, bus and train, and occasionally weapons. Her obituary describes her as a franc-tireur in the 4th Regiment of the Francs-tireurs et partisans français, working in the Dordogne, and, from 1942 until the liberation, as a liaison agent in the 15th Division of the Guerrilleros of Spain, smuggling arms, explosives, orders, messages and money. Le Maitron, in its entry on Picqueray, likewise records that her daughter Sonia served as a liaison agent in a maquis in the Dordogne.

Malkine said she lived in the woods for about two years with a unit of some seventy-five Spanish men, the only woman and the only French member of the group, and that the officer she reported to was Vicente López Tovar, known in the maquis as Alberto.

She went with the guerrillas in October 1944 when they crossed the Pyrenees in a failed attempt to overthrow Francisco Franco, the Invasion of Val d'Aran. In her oral history she described walking over the mountains through the night, one of only two women in the expedition, and coming down at Bossòst, where the guerrillas took the village. She was sent back into France for supplies and orders and given a border pass, a weapon and a convoy of trucks. "I had to take 700 men with weapons and everything to Spain," she recalled. The force withdrew at the end of the month, when the snow came. She kept the armband she had embroidered for the liberation parade at Toulouse.

== Emigration ==
After the liberation Malkine worked as a proofreader in Paris, in the office where her mother worked, and there in 1946 she met the Surrealist painter Georges Malkine, twenty-five years her senior, who had been arrested, tortured and deported by the Germans and had come back from the camps with tuberculosis. The couple married and emigrated to the United States in 1948 with two infant children. They lived for a few years in Brooklyn, where two more children were born and Georges Malkine found work designing embroidery for a linen company. A visit to an old friend of Picqueray's, Stella Ballantine, brought them to Woodstock, and they stayed, eventually buying a house at Shady.

== Music career ==
Malkine began performing in 1958, singing in French and English, and was encouraged by the folklorist Sam Eskin. She sang often for the Alliance Française, whose American branches took her all over the country, and she later performed abroad as well.

Malkine recorded two albums for Folkways Records, Sonia Malkine Sings French Folk Songs (FW08741, 1964) and Sonia Malkine Sings French Songs from the Provinces (FW08743, 1966), singing in French and Occitan to her own lute. Both sets were built around the argument that French folk music is too often reduced to the music of the Auvergne and in fact differs from province to province, though the first album closes with the Auvergnat shepherd's song "Baylèro." In the liner notes to the second she wrote that her "only ambition is to bring to the American public a broader and better idea of French folk music, singing these songs as honestly and lovingly as I know how!"

She hosted several folk-music radio programs. The first was The World of Folk Music on WKNY in Kingston from 1960 to 1962, which ended after she interviewed Pete Seeger, then still under investigation by the House Un-American Activities Committee. She went on to host Troubadour Songs From Then and Now on WBAI in New York City from 1965 to 1967, and later an international folklore program on WDST in Woodstock. She also presented a series of thirty-five folk-music television programs for PBS. Malkine appeared as the sole guest on episode 19 of Seeger's television series Rainbow Quest, performing French folk material.

Malkine was outspoken against war in her music, and among her performances was the 1965 Sing-In for Peace at Carnegie Hall. Her unaccompanied performance of "Where Have All the Flowers Gone?" became a fixture of the annual Woodstock Memorial Day ceremonies. She is listed in the folklife performer records of the State Library and Archives of Florida.

== Death ==
Malkine died on May 31, 2014, at the age of 90. She was predeceased by her husband and by a daughter, and was survived by four more children.

== Discography ==
- Sonia Malkine Sings French Folk Songs (Folkways FW08741, 1964)
- Sonia Malkine Sings French Songs from the Provinces (Folkways FW08743, 1966)
