= La Première Internationale en Espagne (1868–1888) =

1969 history book

- Author: Max Nettlau
- Language: French
- Subject: History of anarchism, labor history
- Publisher: D. Reidel
- Publication date: 1969
- Pages: 683

La Première Internationale en Espagne (1868–1888) is a history book on the Spanish First International. Written by historian Max Nettlau in French, Renée Lamberet edited and verified the posthumous manuscript for publication by D. Reidel in 1969.

== Bibliography ==
- Girault, J. (1971). "Review of La Première Internationale en Espagne (1868-1888)". Revue Historique. 246 (2 (500)): 491–494. ISSN 0035-3264. JSTOR 40952920.
- Konetzke, Richard (1971). "Review of La Première Internationale en Espagne (1868-1888)". Vierteljahrschrift für Sozial- und Wirtschaftsgeschichte. 58 (1): 122–123. ISSN 0042-5699. JSTOR 20731385.
- Lorenzo, César M. (1970). "Review of La Première Internationale en Espagne (1868-1888)". Esprit (1940-). 391 (4): 848–850. ISSN 0014-0759. JSTOR 24261718.
- Maura, Joaquin Romero (1970). "Review of La Première Internationale En Espagne (1868-1888), Renée Lamberet". The American Historical Review. 75 (5): 1470–1471. doi:10.2307/1844552. ISSN 0002-8762. JSTOR 1844552.
- Roesti, Robert M. (1970). "Review of La Premiere Internationale en Espagne (1868-1888)". Industrial and Labor Relations Review. 24 (1): 137–138. doi:10.2307/2521311. ISSN 0019-7939. JSTOR 2521311.
- Vidalenc, Jean (1971). "Review of La Première Internationale en Espagne (1868-1888)". Revue d'histoire économique et sociale. 49 (3): 438–439. ISSN 0035-239X. JSTOR 24084243.
- Zwirn, Jacques (1970). "Review of La Première Internationale en Espagne (1868-1888)". Le Mouvement Social (72): 133–136. doi:10.2307/3807044. ISSN 0027-2671. JSTOR 3807044.
