= Maurice Fayolle =

French anarchist (1909–1970)

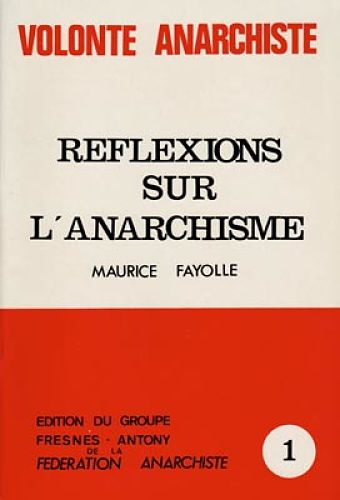

Maurice Fayolle (8 March 1909 – 30 September 1970) was an electrician based in Versailles, best known as an influential libertarian communist militant. A couple of years before his death from lung cancer, he inspired the political regrouping that formed the Revolutionary Anarchist Organisation ("l'Organisation révolutionnaire anarchiste" / l'ORA).

== Life ==
=== Early years ===
Fayolle was born in Paris, and during the early 1930s he became a frequent visitor to the library of the Co-operative Union at Amiens (founded by libertarian anarchists at the start of 1900). Here, he became involved with the Amiens Union of Anarchists, and began to contribute to the anarchist newspaper "Le Libertaire", a regular column under the heading "Réflexe du passant".

=== After the war ===
War ended, formally, in May 1945 but the Paris region had already been liberated the previous summer. Fayolle settled in Versailles where he joined in the reconstruction of the Libertarian Movement which towards the end of 1945 became the Anarchist Federation. Between 1945 and 1952 he took on the secretaryship for internal relations, and then, in 1950, that for external relations. However, he was opposed to the de facto power seizure by Georges Fontenis and early in 1953 he was excluded from the Anarchist Federation.

Fontenis take-over had been quickly followed by a name change to Communist Libertarian Federation. Fayolle then worked with Maurice Joyeux to create a new Anarchist Federation, and, starting in October 1954, a supporting newspaper, "Le Monde libertaire". A delegate at most of the federation's congresses, he was able to build a thesis of "organised worker anarchism". During the Algerian War of Independence, he repeatedly wrote in support of the anti-colonialist struggle, but also warned against the perils of a "nationalist revolution" leading to the emergence of a new hegemonistic bourgeoisie.

=== Revolutionary Anarchist Organisation ===
Identifying a stagnation in the anarchist movement which he attributed to its "aversion to organisation" ("inaptitude à l’organisation") he proposed the implementation of a more structured operation, applying the conven tion al economic and political precepts of the time. In 1956 he started calling for changes to the constitution of the Anarchist Federation, intended to "create an anarchist organisation with serious and dependable underpinnings, with a membership of men determined to move beyond sterile platitudes" (" créer une organisation anarchiste sur des bases sérieuses et solides, ne rassemblant que des hommes résolus à s’évader des paroles stériles"). In 1965 he published a collection of his texts articles in a book under the title "Réflexions sur l’anarchisme". He tried to convince Anarchist Federation militants in internal publications and presentations made to federation congresses. He failed. His advocacy of structural change encountered implacable opposition from numerous militant individualists who feared any more authoritarian approach, and for whom the superiority of minimalist organisational structures was an article of faith.

In 1967 his concerns drove him to propound a new approach, and he advocated the Revolutionary Anarchist Organisation ("l'Organisation révolutionnaire anarchiste" / l'ORA). He went on to produce a new publication, "L'Organisation libertaire", of which the first edition was published at Marseille in January 1968. The "events" of May 1968 gave a new impetus to the ORA which progressively separated itself out from the Anarchist Federation, most spectacularly at the International Anarchist Congress at Carrara in August/September 1968 where the ORA successfully backed his nomination to the international organisation's secretaryship. The next stepping stone to a split came at the Anarchist Federation congress in November 1968 when Fayolle and his supporters were accused of factionalism and stripped of their functions within the federation. In the end the ORA broke with the Anarchist Federation at the end of March 1970, uncompromisingly committed to a "platformist" structure.

Maurice Fayolle was elected to the provisional national executive but by now he was gravely ill. He was taken to hospital at Versailles in May 1970 and died from lung cancer on 30 September 1970.
