= Roubia =

Commune in Occitanie, France

- Commune
- Coat of arms
- Location of Roubia
- Location within France Location within Occitanie
- Coordinates: 43°14′54″N 2°48′02″E
- Country: France
- Region: Occitania
- Department: Aude
- Arrondissement: Narbonne
- Canton: Le Sud-Minervois
- Intercommunality: Région Lézignanaise, Corbières et Minervois

Government
  - Mayor (2020–2026): Geneviève Lopez
- Area^{1}: 7.38 km^{2} (2.85 sq mi)
- Elevation: 35 m (115 ft)
- Highest elevation: 122 m (400 ft)
- Lowest elevation: 19 m (62 ft)
- Population (2023): 520
  - Density: 70/km^{2} (180/sq mi)
- Time zone: UTC+01:00 (CET)
  - Summer (DST): UTC+02:00 (CEST)
- INSEE/Postal code: 11324 /11200
- ^{1} French Land Register data, which excludes lakes, ponds, glaciers > 1 km^{2} (0.386 sq mi or 247 acres) and river estuaries.

Roubia (French pronunciation: [ʁubja]; Occitan: Robian) is a commune in the Aude department in southern France.

== Population ==
Historical population
| Year | Pop. | ±% p.a. |
|---|---|---|
| 1968 | 490 | — |
| 1975 | 425 | −2.01% |
| 1982 | 368 | −2.04% |
| 1990 | 406 | +1.24% |
| 1999 | 401 | −0.14% |
| 2007 | 445 | +1.31% |
| 2012 | 497 | +2.23% |
| 2017 | 509 | +0.48% |
| 2023 | 520 | +0.36% |
Source: INSEE

== See also ==
- Communes of the Aude department
