= Maurice Laisant =

French anarchist (1909–1991)

Maurice Laissant (11 March 1909 – 29 September 1991) Began his career working for the French national railway company before taking a job as a sales representative. He became progressively more widely known as a militant anarchist individualist, free thinker and pacifist. He was a co-founder in 1953 of the newly regrouped Paris based Anarchist Federation.

In 1955 he hit the headlines when he was convicted for printing a poster condemning the war in Indo-China and the writer Albert Camus publicly came to his defence.

== Life ==
=== Provenance and early years ===
Maurice Laisant came from a political family. His grandfather was the radical Deputy for Nantes, Charles-Ange Laisant. Maurice and his younger brother Charles Laisant inherited their libertarian beliefs from their parents.

He was initiated into the Free Masons in 1926, joining the "Concordia" lodge of the Grand Orient de France. Normal minimum age requirements were waived because his father was already a member. However, his father died shortly afterwards, on 28 November 1928, and he was required to quit. Despite this unhappy experience he would later defend the Masons from criticism, notably among any fellow anarchists hostile to free masonry.

He joined the Young Pacifists' Union (Union des Jeunesses pacifistes de France /UJPF) in 1935. In 1939 he began working on Le Libertaire, the weekly newspaper which at this time was published by the "Anarchist Union".

=== Co-founder of the Anarchist federation ===
After the Second World War ended in May 1945 Maurice Laisant was one of a number of individuals who co-founded, in December 1945, the Anarchist Federation. The co-founders also included Robert Joulin, Maurice Fayolle, Maurice Joyeux, Roger Caron and Henri Bouyé. In 1946 he started to work with Louis Louvet on the anti-militarist weekly publication, "Ce qu'il faut dire" ("What needs to be said"). He attended the first congress of the "General Pacifist Federation" (Confédération générale pacifiste / CGP), held in Paris in November 1946, participating as a member of the propaganda commission.

Laisant frequently intervened in support of conscientious objectors even where his personal position on conscientious objection was more nuanced. Maurice Rajsfus recalled a debate on fundamentals within the Anarchist Federation in which Maurice Laisant, while inviting discussion, nevertheless set forth his own point of view with great coherence:

"What is conscientious objection if it is not the refusal of a man to bend himself to laws and current customs? In every age and place there has been conscientious objection, individually or in groups, of man against the established order .... I have never advocated conscientious objection, because I judge that it can only be a personal matter, and not something that can ever be judged by anyone other than the individual directly affected: I also should not wish to impose on others a path that I have not myself had the courage to pursue."

Following fragmentation within the Anarchist Federation Maurice Laisant was one of those who set about reconstructing the group in 1953, in the process becoming one of its leading members. In 1956, together with Maurice Joyeux, he joined the editorial committee of Le Monde libertaire, the Federation's (by now monthly) magazine.

At the start of the 1950s he was a member of "Free Forces for Peace" ("Forces Libres de la Paix"), becoming the group's propaganda secretary in 1952.

=== The poster affair ===
In October 1954 Laisant faced charges following the publication of a forceful poster calling for the ending of hostilities in Indo-China. The poster failed to include the requisite legal notice, and it had been printed on white paper. In February 1955 he was condemned by a Paris court and required to pay a large fine. One of those who spoke up for Laisant at his trial was Albert Camus, already an influential supporter of French liberal traditions.

Camus told the court:

"I got to know Camus in a meeting where we joined together to call for the freedom of men condemned to death in a neighbouring country. Since then I have on various occasions had to admire his willingness to struggle against the scourge that menaces humanity. I find it impossible that anyone could ever condemn a man whose actions are so completely aligned with the interests of every other person. People prepared to stand up against a danger to humanity that grows more terriuble every day are too rare".

Camus was clearly impressed by the activism of Maurice Laisant.

=== Later years ===
In June 1957, at their congress in Nantes, Laisant was appointed Secretary General of the Anarchist Federation, a post he would continue to hold till 1975.

In May 1978, after the Ris-Orangis congress at which the Anarchist Federation recognised the class struggle, he took issue with the federation for its drift towards Marxism. With various other groups out of sympathy with this trend, he launched a new edition of Le Libertaire, publication of which had lapsed a few years earlier. It was on the basis of this latest split that in November 1979 he was among the founders of the Union of Anarchists: he remained a member till he died.

== See also ==
- List of peace activists
