= Max Nettlau =

German anarchist and historian

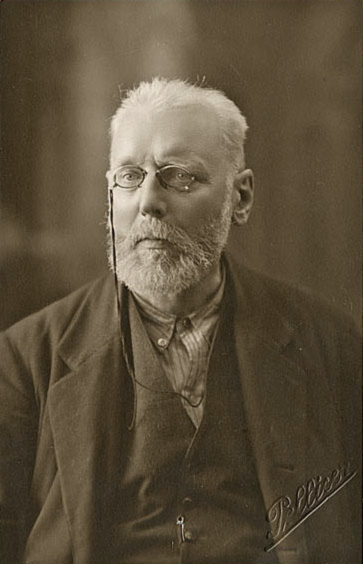
- Max Nettlau
- Born: Max Heinrich Hermann Reinhardt Nettlau; 30 April 1865 Neuwaldegg, Archduchy of Austria, German Confederation
- Died: 23 July 1944 (aged 79) Amsterdam, Reichskommissariat Niederlande
- Genre: History, politics
- Literary movement: Anarchism

Max Heinrich Hermann Reinhardt Nettlau (German: [ˈnɛtlaʊ]; 1865–1944) was a German anarchist and historian.

His extensive collection or archives was sold to the International Institute of Social History in Amsterdam in 1935. He lived continuously in Amsterdam from 1938 where he worked on cataloging the archive for the Institute. He died there suddenly from stomach cancer in 1944, without ever being harassed.

== Works ==
- Bibliographie de L'Anarchie (1887)
  Republished in 1964 by P.Galeati (Italy) and in 1968 by Burt Franklin (United States), subtitled "Brief History of Anarchism"
- Élisée Reclus, Anarchist und Gelehrter. "Der Syndikalist" (1928)
- La anarquía a través de los tiempos (1933 or 1935)
  Published 1991 in English by Freedom Press as A Short History of Anarchism
- La Première Internationale en Espagne (1868–1888) (1969)

Edited

- Oeuvres of Mikhail Bakunin, vol. 1 (1895)

== See also ==
- Anarchism in Germany

== Works cited ==
- Nursey-Bray, Paul F, ed. (1992). Anarchist Thinkers and Thought: An Annotated Bibliography. New York: Greenwood Press. ISBN 978-0-313-27592-0. OCLC 24667588.
