= Radio Libertaire =

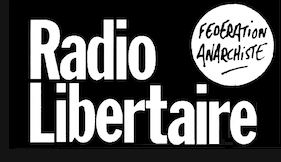
- Paris; France
- Frequency: 89.4 MHz (Paris-Île-de-France)
- RDS: RL.89.4

Programming
- Language: French

Ownership
- Owner: Federation anarchiste

History
- First air date: 1981

Links
- Website: www.radio-libertaire.org

Radio Libertaire is an FM French radio station of the Anarchist Federation (FA) in Paris, France transmitting on 89.4 MHZ. It was founded in 1981. By 1998 it had become one of the ten most popular stations in the Paris region.

== History ==
The establishment of Radio Libertaire was unanimously approved at the federal congress in May 1981, following extended and at times contradictory discussions. At the time of its creation, the station had no official name, call sign, defined project, or presenters, and it launched with a modest budget of 15,000 francs. The use of radio as a tool for disseminating anarchist ideas has historical precedent, including messages broadcast by the Kronstadt insurgents in 1921 and Radio CNT-FAI ECN1 in Spain in 1936. More immediately, the creation of Radio Libertaire continued recent anarchist involvement in the French free radio movement of the late 1970s, particularly through initiatives such as Radio-Trottoir (in Toulon) and Radio-Alarme, whose presenters were affiliated with the federation.

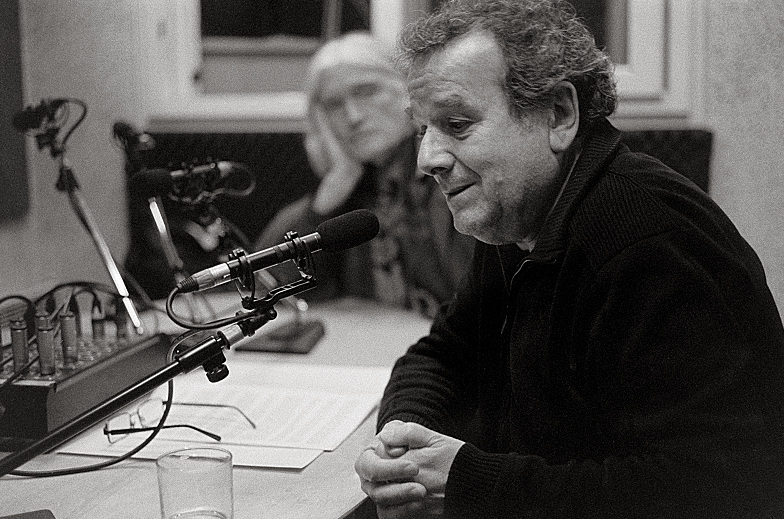
Studio of Radio Libertaire

Broadcasts began on 1 September 1981 at 6 p.m., from the basement of a public library, where the Louise Michel anarchist group had set up a makeshift studio in the 18th arrondissement of Paris: a 12 m² room filled with equipment and a team of six people.

On 28 August 1983, as part of the French government's general policy to put an end to disorderly FM broadcasts, the CRS arrived at the Radio Libertaire premises, broke down the door and seized the equipment. Presenters were beaten and arrested, and the antenna cable and tower were cut, despite the presence of many listeners. That same afternoon, the seals affixed by the police to the studio door were ripped off and work began on refurbishing it. On 3 September, a demonstration brought together more than 5,000 people between Place de la République and Barbès–Rochechouart. Radio Libertaire resumed its live broadcasts from one of the demonstration's sound trucks.

On 8 and 9 October, around thirty artists performed in support, at the Espace Balard, then the largest venue in Paris (seating 7,000). Many associations (including two sections of the Socialist Party) were present. On 13 December, Léo Ferré gave a supportive performance at the same venue. Faced with this massive and constant mobilisation, the authorities gave in. Frequency 89.4 was definitively allocated to Radio Libertaire.

== Cultural identity ==
The station's cultural identity has been built up over time. The first presenters brought their records into the studio and introduced artists such as Debronckart, Maurice Fanon, Gilles Servat, Gribouille, Michel Jonasz, Serge Utgé-Royo, Jean Aurenche, Capart and many others.

In 1982, another kind of music, often heard in squats on the fringes of the system, arrived on the radio: alternative rock. Then other types of music found their place on Radio Libertaire: jazz, blues, folk, industrial music, rap through the Réveil Hip Hop programme on Saturday mornings at 8 am/10 am, reggae and punk of all kinds thanks to the commitment inherent in this movement. Other artists have come into contact with radio, which has opened up a wide range of forms of expression: comic strips, the visual arts, theatre, literature, film, etc.

== Political identity ==
Although it served as a means of expression for the Fédération anarchiste, Radio Libertaire initially opened its microphones to sympathizers as well: anarcho-syndicalists from the CNT and other unions, free-thinkers, pacifist groups, Esperanto speakers, and the Human Rights League.

When the Gulf War broke out, Radio Libertaire positioned itself as the ‘anti-war’ radio station, announcing demonstrations, meetings and neighbourhood committee meetings on an hourly basis, as well as offering debates and analyses.

== See also ==
- Nelly Trumel
