= Armand Robin =

Breton poet (1912–1961)

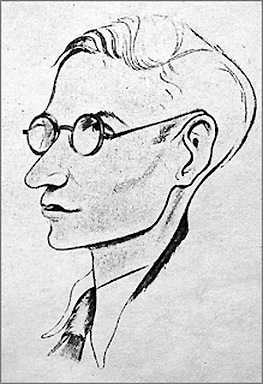
- Portrait of Robin, 1943
- Born: January 19, 1912; Plouguernével, French Third Republic
- Died: March 29, 1961 (aged 49); 1st arrondissement of Paris, French Fifth Republic
- Cause of death: Police violence

Armand Robin (January 19, 1912 – March 29, 1961) was a French poet, translator, and journalist.

He joined the French Anarchist Federation in 1945, which published his Poèmes indésirables (Undesirable Poems). He authored La fausse parole (The False Word), which dissected the mechanisms of propaganda in the totalitarian countries.

He was arrested on March 28, 1961 after an altercation in a cafe. He was taken to a local police station and beaten up by police. He was transferred to the special infirmary at the Paris Police Prefecture and died in suspicious circumstances. According to Jacques Bergier, the police were unable to explain the motives for their actions.

== Works ==
=== Own poetry with translations ===
- Ma vie sans moi (1940); My life without me

=== Poetry ===
- Poèmes indésirables (1945)
- Le Monde d'une voix, Éditions Gallimard (1968)
- Fragments, Gallimard (1992)
- Le cycle du pays natal, La Part Commune (2000)

=== Translations ===
- Poèmes d'Ady, Le Seuil (1946), Le temps qu'il fait (1991)
- Poèmes de Boris Pasternak (1946)
- Quatre Poètes russes (1949)
- Poésie non traduite (1953)
- Poésie non traduite II (1958)
- Rubayat d'Omar Khayam (1958)
- Les Gaillardes Épouses de Windsor et Othello de Shakespeare (1958)
- Le Roi Lear de Shakespeare (1959)
- Écrits oubliés II, Ubacs (1986)

=== Novel ===
- Le Temps qu'il fait (1942)

=== Radio broadcasts ===
- Pâques fête de la joie, Calligrammes (1982)
- Poésie sans passeport, Ubacs (1990)

=== Essays, articles ===
- La fausse Parole, Minuit (1953), Le Temps qu'il fait (2002)
- L'homme sans nouvelle, Le temps qu'il fait (1981)
- Écrits oubliés I, Ubacs (1986)
- Expertise de la fausse parole, Ubacs (1990)

=== Correspondence ===
- Lettres à Jean Guéhenno, Lettres à Jules Supervielle, Librairie La Nerthe (2006)
