= Le Libertaire =

Defunct Francophone anarchist newspaper in New York (1800's and 1900's)

Le Libertaire ('The Libertarian') is a Francophone anarchist newspaper established in New York City in June 1858 by the exiled anarchist Joseph Déjacque. It appeared at slightly irregular intervals until February 1861. The title reappeared in Algiers in 1892 and was then produced in Brussels between 1893 and 1894.

In 1895, Le Libertaire was relaunched as a weekly publication in France by Sébastien Faure and in the socially and politically turbulent years that accompanied rapid economic change during the run up to 1914 it became a leading title in a growing field of anarchist newspapers and journals.

Publication persisted from 1918 until 1939 and then from 1944 until 1956. Le Libertaire returned in 1968 and was produced intermittently until 2011, although it was restricted to online publication after 2005. As of 2016, there are reports that it continues to exist as an "internet space".

== History ==
=== Le Libertaire (New York: 1858–1861) ===
Le Libertaire (1858–1861)
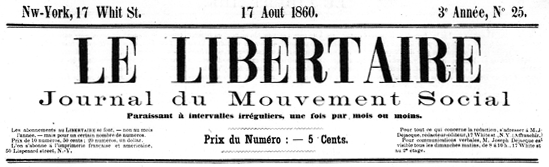
- Founded: 9 June 1858
- Ceased publication: 1861
- Language: French
- City: New York
- Country: United States

Le Libertaire (1892)
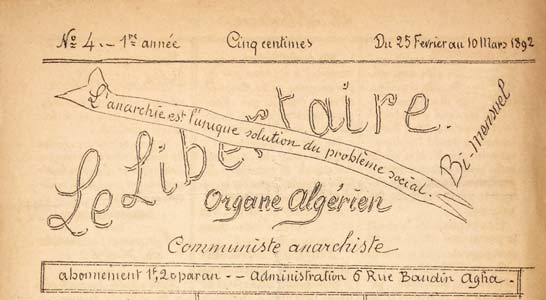
- Founded: 27 January 1892
- Language: French
- City: Algiers
- Country: Algeria

Le Libertaire (1893–1894)
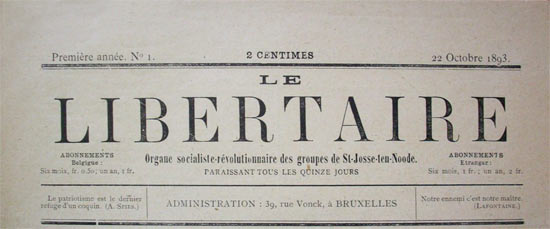
- Founded: 23 October 1893
- Ceased publication: 1894
- Language: French
- City: Brussels
- Country: Belgium

Le Libertaire (1895–1914)
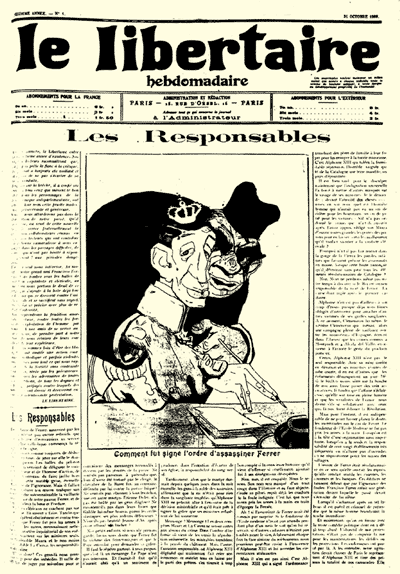
- Le Libertaire, 31 October 1909. The cartoon refers to the execution of Francisco Ferrer.
- Founded: 16 July 1895
- Ceased publication: 1914
- Language: French
- City: Paris, Marseilles
- Country: France

Le Libertaire
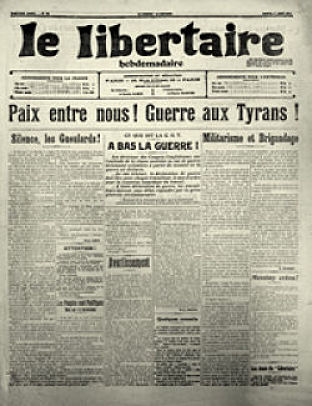
- Le Libertaire, 1 August 1914 "Peace between us! War to the tyrants!" The final edition before the war became a reality and publication was suspended in 1914.

The first edition of Le Libertaire was published in New York City. Subtitled Journal du Mouvement Social, it was produced by Joseph Déjacque, a noted writer and anarchist journalist who had arrived in the United States as a political refugee in 1854 in order to escape a prison sentence handed out on 22 October 1851 by a Paris court. Prosecuted originally for "inciting hatred and disrespect for the government, stirring up mutual hatred and contempt between citizens, and for actions defined as crimes under the criminal law" by the government of the short-lived Second Republic, Déjacque had been faced by a tribunal decision to destroy his poetry Les Lazaréennes: fables et poésies sociales, along with two years in prison and a 2,000 franc fine. In order to escape the fate determined for him by the court, he had initially taken refuge in Brussels and then in London before moving on to Jersey and finally the United States.

Déjacque's republican-socialist beliefs had been shattered by the June Massacres in 1848. He reacted by turning to an uncompromising radicalism that rejected all forms of authority, exploitation and economic privilege. He published La question révolutionnaire in 1854, a book in which he attacked religion, the family, property rights and government, to set out to demonstrate their "devastating impacts" (effets dévastateurs). Le Libertaire was the journal of a corresponding social movement, giving him the chance to explain the meaning of "true anarchism" (la vraie anarchie) and "radical anarchism", set on a foundation of "absolute liberty". In the first edition, he detailed the libertarian programme as such: "It starts with a single supreme principal: liberty in everything for everyone [la liberté et en tout et pour tous]. The only authority it acknowledges is the authority of progress. In everything and for everyone it wants to abolish all forms of slavery, and to enfranchise every individual body and soul".

According to information appearing directly below its title, the New York City version of Le Libertaire appeared at irregular intervals, but generally once or twice per month. By August 1860, Déjacque had produced 25 editions. Le Libertaire continued to appear until January or February 1861.

=== Le Libertaire (Algiers: 1892) ===
On 27 January 1892, Jean Faure published Le Libertaire in Algiers. It was described as an "Algerian communist anarchist organ" (une organe algérien communiste anarchiste). Seven issues were produced and distributed across the French north African Littoral, from Oran to Sfax.

Apart from the announcements of a few public meetings, very little of the content was concerned with Algeria or with social developments locally. Most of the features concerned themes such as anti-militarism, social inequalities, salary exploitation and the Paris Commune.

=== Le Libertaire (Brussels: 1893–1894) ===
Le Libertaire reappeared in Brussels on 23 October 1893, now appearing twice monthly and carrying the subtitle The St-Josse-ten-Noode Socialist-Revolutionary organ (Organe socialiste-révolutionnaire des groupes de St-Josse-ten-Noode). In this iteration, it was founded by Henri Willems (administration) and Charles Herkelboeck (printing). It was produced along with L'Antipatriote, a similarly focused publication which the two of them had launched in 1892 and which appeared until 1894. On 5 April 1894, Willems and Herkelboeck were indicted for "press crimes" (délit de presse) in connection with an article that had appeared in L'Antipatriote celebrating Auguste Vaillant, who had been guillotined in Paris two months earlier. Vaillant's crime had involved throwing a rather ineffective bomb into the French parliament chamber from its public gallery. Willems and Herkelboeck were found guilty by the court of the "press crimes" for which they sere charged and condemned to spend four years in prison and pay a 1,000 franc fine. As a result, Le Libertaire ceased to appear in Brussels after the eleventh edition, dated 10 March 1894.

=== Le Libertaire (France: 1895–1914) ===
Sébastien Faure launched Le Libertaire in France on 16 November 1895. Widespread reports that Louise Michel was a co-founder with Faure may be incorrect, but she certainly collaborated with him in its production. The French version of Le Libertaire was produced in Paris and Marseilles. The first 32 editions of the journal produced in France carried the subtitle Established by S.Faure (Fondé par S.Faure). The paper appeared on a weekly basis between 1895 and 1914 except during an eleven-month hiatus between February and December 1899 when it was replaced by a daily paper entitled Le Journal du peuple (The Peoples' Paper). Starting in August 1899, Faure also produced an illustrated supplementary Le Libertaire illustré which was produced alongside Le Journal du peuple, continuing to appear after the return of the weekly Le Libertaire until August 1914, at which point after 960 editions had emerged an end to publication was enforced on account of Le Libertaire's anti-militarism stance.

=== Le Libertaire (France: 1917, 1919–1939) ===
Following a tentative and brief reappearance in 1917, Le Libertaire returned in 1919 and continued to be published without interruption until 1939 when a return to war forced its suspension. Between December 1923 and March 1925, the paper again switched from weekly to daily publication.

In France as in Germany, the aftermath of war was accompanied by a splintering of the political left and the emergence of a substantial communist party. Within the French trades union movement, there was a corresponding split with the creation in 1922 of the Confédération générale du travail unitaire (CGTU), a grouping of pro-libertarian, pro-communist factions formerly within the mainstream General Confederation of Labour (CGT). Eventually in 1936, the CGTU merged back into the CGT. In the meantime, under Sebastian Faure Le Libertaire was firm in its support for the breakaway CGTU.

=== Le Libertaire (France: 1944–1956) ===
War ended in May 1945. The first postwar edition of Le Libertaire appeared on 21 December 1944. Subsequent editions were published intermittently and then twice per month, with activities restricted by paper rationing. It returned to weekly publication in April 1946. The first eleven editions after the war included the subheading under the title The Federalist organ of the Libertarian Movement (Organe fédéraliste du Mouvement libertaire). The period became a golden age for Le Libertaire. Contributors included Georges Brassens, who would later become a permanent member of the production team. Others were Léo Ferré, André Breton, Armand Robin and Albert Camus.

The French Anarchist Federation, whose members were well represented among contributors to Le Libertaire, underwent a breakup of its own during the early 1950s. In May 1953, after the takeover by the OPB faction and the exclusion or departure of those opposed to it, the residual Anarchist Federation renamed itself as the Federation of Libertarian Communism (FCL) and it was this group within an increasingly fragmented movement that now owned the title Le Libertaire. Starting with issue 378, dated 3 December 1953, the newspaper's front page featured the subtitle Organe de la Fédération Communiste Libertaire. By this time, the war in Algeria was rising rapidly up the political agenda and Le Libertaire backed independence for Algeria. The FCL now found itself under attack from the government in the courts, and built up a crippling burden of legal indebtedness. Weekly editions of Le Libertaire disappeared in July 1956, three years after the anarchist schism that had given birth to the FCL and its control of the newspaper. The national council of the FCL resolved to "suspend" Le Libertaire on 17 July 1956. By that time, edition 486, the final edition of the series, had already appeared on 5 July 1956. The newspaper's role would eventually be taken on by Le Monde libertaire, published by a reconstituted anarchist federation which would take up the torch of Le Libertaire.

=== Le Libertaire (France: 1968–present) ===
Between 1968 and 1972, the Federal Union of Anarchists took over the title of ten numbers.

In 1977, the title is taken again for a number of mimeographed by the Fresnes-Antony group of the Anarchist Federation.

In May 1978, Le Libertaire reappears, being published by members of the Anarchist Federation in rupture with this last one. In 1979, Jean-Pierre Jacquinot, the editor of Le Libertaire, left this organization and founded with Maurice Laisant and other groups the Union of Anarchists at the Congress of Nevers (November 1979). Le Libertaire would then be the unofficial organ of this organization. Gradually, the editorial part of the Jules Durand Group became dominant. It was first edited by the Jules Durand groups, Atelier du Soir, Germinal, then Jules Durand and Atelier du soir, then by the Jules Durand group and activists of the Union of Anarchists.

At the Congress of Dijon (1993) of the Union of Anarchists, Jean-Pierre Jacquinot is excluded. At the Congress of Saint Léger-les-Vignes (1994), the break is official and the group Jules Durand withdraws from the Union of Anarchists, carrying Le Libertaire with it. At the General Assembly of Le Havre in September 1995, the publisher group and other activists (former members of the Union of Anarchists, among others) founded the Anarchist Coordination and Le Libertaire becomes the unofficial organ. In 2001, the group Jules Durand decides to dissolve it, but it continues to claim it.

In November 2005, the financial difficulties forced the group to stop publishing Le Libertaire. The newspaper continued its publication via the Internet until at least 2011 and became the "internet space" of the libertarian group Jules Durand16.
