= Le Monde libertaire =

French political magazine

- Categories: Political magazine
- Frequency: Weekly
- Founder: Anarchist Federation
- First issue: 1 October 1954; 70 years ago
- Country: France
- Based in: Paris
- Language: French
- Website: Le Monde libertaire
- ISSN: 0026-9433
- OCLC: 29863497

Le Monde libertaire (French: Libertarian World) is an anarchist French weekly organ of the Anarchist Federation. Founded in 1954, it is the direct successor of Le Libertaire which was contributed by Albert Camus, Georges Brassens, Louise Michel and André Breton.

== History and profile ==
Le Monde libertaire was first published as a monthly magazine in October 1954. Its name is a reference to another publication called Le Libertaire, which was launched in France in 1895 by Sébastien Faure and Louise Michel. On 6 October 1977 the frequency of Le Monde libertaire was switched to weekly. The magazine is published by the Fédération Anarchiste.

Le Monde libertaire was the sole mouthpiece of the French anarchist movement before 1968. It did not support the involvement of France in the war in Algeria. Unlike other anarchist publications, the magazine covered no content on environmental issues until Spring 1968.
