= Maurice Joyeux =

French writer and anarchist (1910–1991)

Maurice Joyeux (29 January 1910 – 9 December 1991) was a French writer and anarchist. He first was a mechanic then a bookseller, he is a remarkable figure in the French Libertarianism movement. His father died as a social activist. In 1928, he joined the military services in Morocco and completed his service in Algeria.

== Bibliography ==
- Buelinckx, Erik (2011). "Joyeux, Maurice (1910–1991)". In Ness, Immanuel (ed.). The International Encyclopedia of Revolution and Protest. p. 1. doi:10.1002/9781405198073.wbierp1783. ISBN 9781405198073.
- Maitron, Jean; Boulouque, Sylvain; Dupuy, Rolf (7 October 2024) [14 April 2014]. "JOYEUX Maurice, Alexis". Dictionnaire des anarchistes (in French). Éditions de l'Atelier. ISBN 9782708242685.
