= Anarchist Federation (France) =

French political organization

- Fédération anarchiste
- Abbreviation: FA
- Formation: 2 December 1945
- Headquarters: Paris
- Official language: French
- Affiliations: International of Anarchist Federations
- Website: federation-anarchiste.org

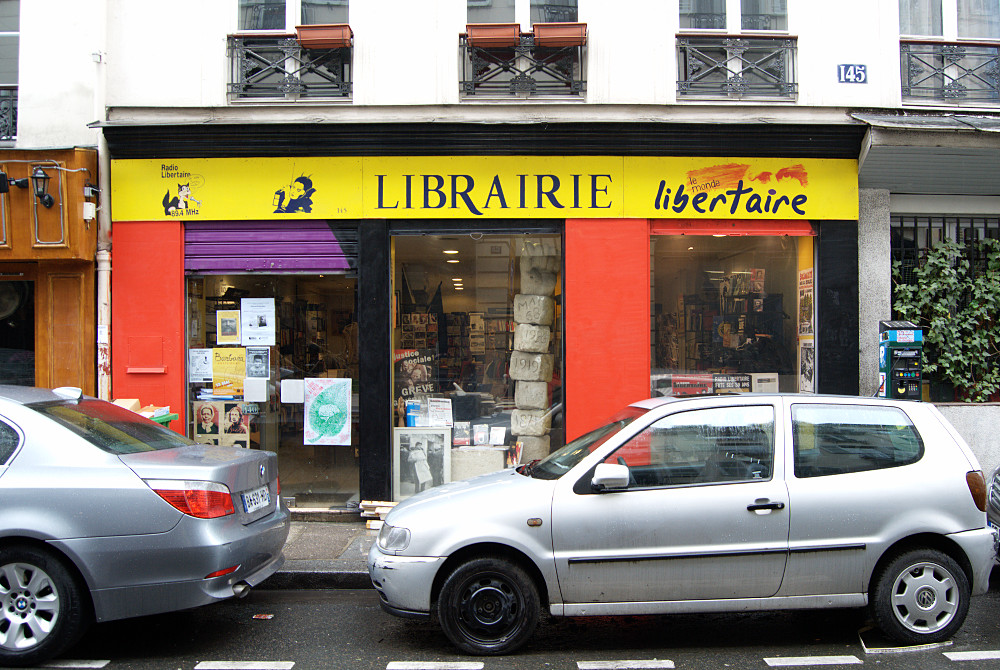
The bookshop Publico, run by the Fédération Anarchiste

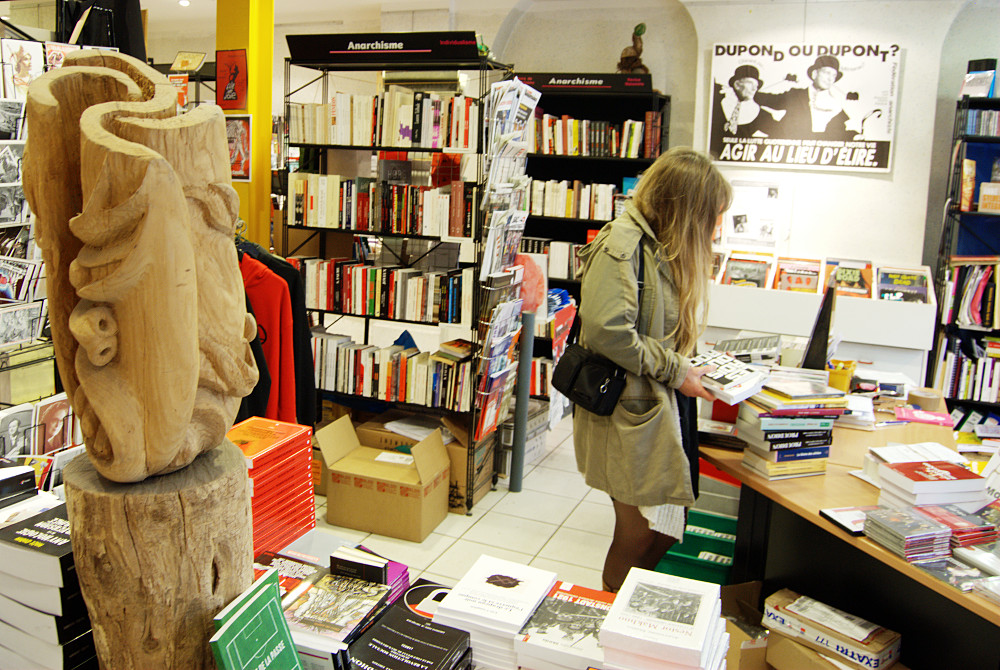
Inside Publico

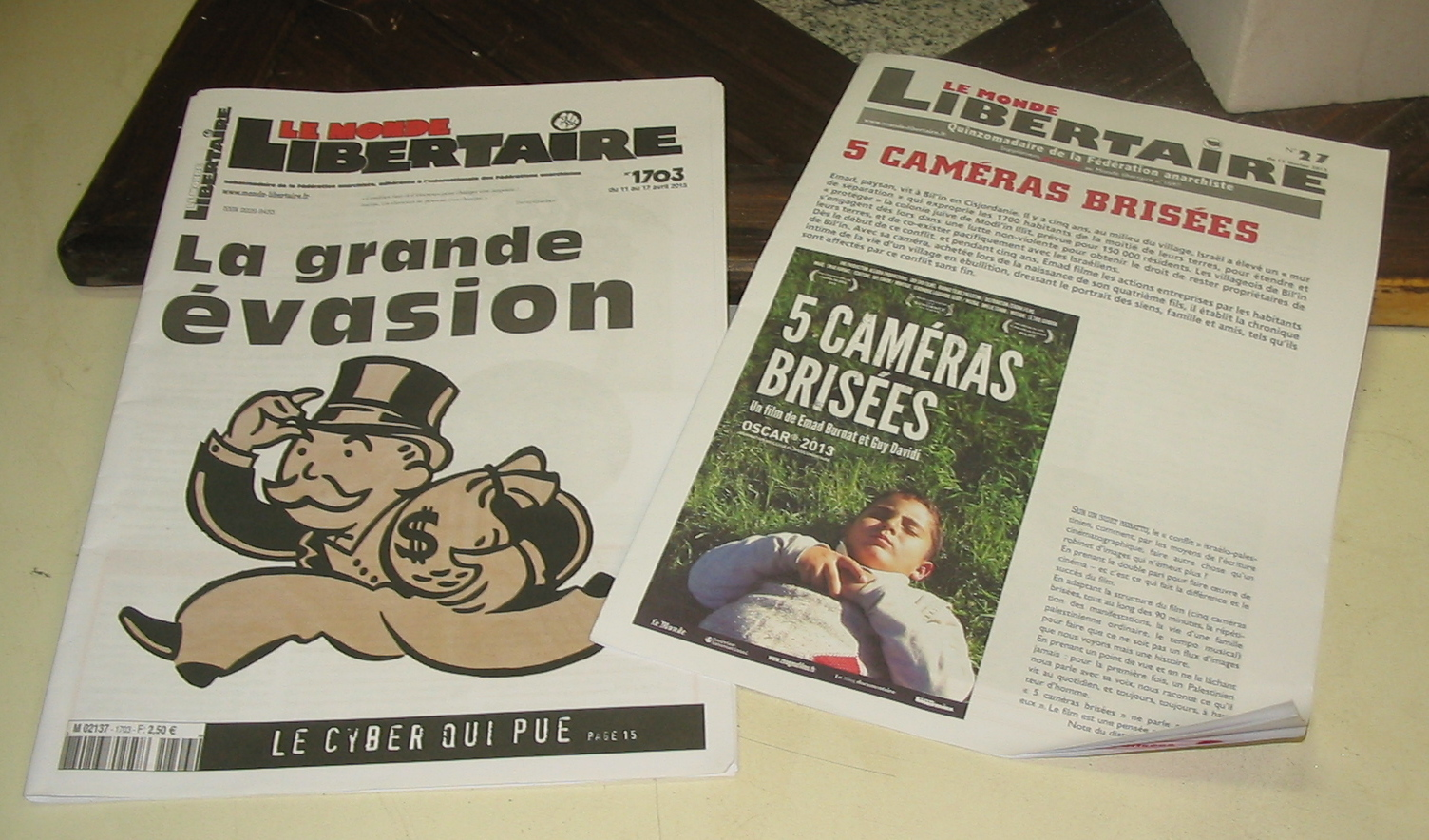
Le Monde libertaire

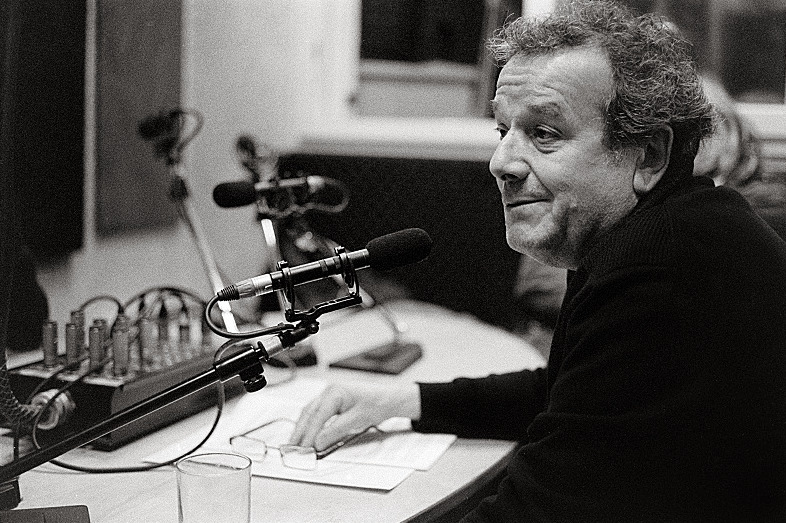
Studio of Radio Libertaire

The Anarchist Federation (French: Fédération Anarchiste; FA) is an anarchist political organisation based in France, and the French-speaking regions of Belgium and Switzerland. It is a member of the International of Anarchist Federations since the latter's establishment in 1968.

== Background ==
The Nazi occupation of France during World War II resulted in the effective collapse of the pre-war French anarchist movement. Throughout the course of the occupation, several meetings were held with the aim to reorganise the movement and establish a new anarchist federation. In early 1944, Parisian anarchist Henri Bouyé clandestinely travelled around the country, forming links between local underground groups and distributing manifestos calling for a revolution. Meanwhile, in southern France, anarcho-syndicalists led by Jean-René Saulière were also reorganising in collaboration with exiled Spanish anarchists of International Anti-fascist Solidarity (SIA).

== Establishment ==
In the spring of 1945, Saulière convened an anarchist congress in Paris, but internal divisions permeated the event, as Bouyé clashed with a rival Parisian group, while Saulière's leadership was disputed by the SIA. The two networks were eventually able to put aside their differences, and on 2 December 1945, they held the founding congress of the new Anarchist Federation (French: Fédération anarchiste; FA). The new federation sought to move on from the previous generation's methods of action and organisational models, which it considered to have been a failure. It obliged its members to carry membership cards, majority voting was used at its meetings, and a central committee was established to coordinate the different groups of the federation. The libertarian communist Georges Fontenis was elected as its first general secretary, a post he served in from 1946 to 1948. It also re-established Le Libertaire as its weekly newspaper, which gained a circulation of tens of thousands of copies. It also collaborated with the nascent National Confederation of Labour (CNT), an anarcho-syndicalist trade union.

== Splits ==
The new FA was immediately marked by internal divisions. In 1950, Georges Fontenis was re-elected as general secretary of the FA. That same year, he established a secret group within the FA, the Thought-Battle Organisation (French: Organisation Pensée Bataille; OPB), to combat the influence of individualist anarchists within the FA. Using entryist tactics, the OPB quickly captured control of the FA's Parisian organisations, provoking a wave of defections. At the federation's 1953 congress, the OPB expelled the individualists from the organisation, which they renamed to the Libertarian Communist Federation (French: Fédération communiste libertaire; FCL). The expelled activists subsequently re-established the Anarchist Federation, which admitted anarchists of various different tendencies. A grouping within the FCL, the Groupes Anarchistes d'Action Revolutionaires (GAAR), also split from the FCL and a majority of its members later joined the new FA.

During the protests of May 68, some revolutionary anarchist groups began to distance themselves from the FA, which they considered to be overly dogmatic, and established the Movement of 22 March (M22M). During the same period, the Revolutionary Anarchist Organization (ORA) emerged in the FA and, by 1971, it broke away from the organisation. The May 68 protests gave way to an ideological transformation within the FA, which moved away from the previous generation's pacifism and individualism towards more militant and socially-orientated activities. Over time, the FA itself became more closely aligned with social anarchism.

== Activities ==
The FA had a presence in the 1947 Renault strikes and the protests of May 68. The FA was relatively late to the latter movement, with FA member Maurice Joyeaux commenting "jumped on a train that was already moving!" The FA runs a radio station called Radio libertaire, as well as its newspaper Le Libertaire. The FA is also behind a number of anarchist bookshops in France.

The FA regularly takes part in the anarchist demonstration of 1 May in Paris.

== See also ==
- Anarchism in France
- Italian Anarchist Federation
- Nelly Trumel

== Bibliography ==
- Berry, David (2002). "Anti-militarism, Resistance and Collaboration". A History of the French Anarchist Movement: 1917 to 1945. Westport, CT: Greenwood Press. pp. 253–272. ISBN 0-313-32026-8. ISSN 0885-9159. LCCN 2001054702.
- Berry, David (2019). "Anarchism and 1968". In Adams, Matthew S.; Levy, Carl (eds.). The Palgrave Handbook of Anarchism. London: Palgrave Macmillan. pp. 449–470. doi:10.1007/978-3-319-75620-2_26. ISBN 978-3319756196. S2CID 158605651.
- Daniel, Evan Matthew; Heath, Nick (2009). "Anarchism, France". In Ness, Immanuel (ed.). The International Encyclopedia of Revolution and Protest. pp. 119–122. doi:10.1002/9781405198073.wbierp0054. ISBN 978-1-4051-8464-9.
- Marshall, Peter H. (2008) [1992]. Demanding the Impossible: A History of Anarchism. London: Harper Perennial. ISBN 978-0-00-686245-1. OCLC 218212571.
- Skirda, Alexandre (2002). Facing the enemy: A history of anarchist organisation. Translated by Sharkey, Paul. Oakland: AK Press. ISBN 1902593197. OCLC 490977034.
- van der Walt, Lucien; Schmidt, Michael (2009). Black Flame: The Revolutionary Class Politics of Anarchism and Syndicalism. Edinburgh: AK Press. pp. 239–270. ISBN 978-1-904859-16-1. LCCN 2006933558. OCLC 1100238201.
