= Anarchism in Belgium =

Anarchism spread into Belgium as Communards took refuge in Brussels with the fall of the Paris Commune. Most Belgian members in the First International joined the anarchist Jura Federation after the socialist schism. Belgian anarchists also organized the 1886 Walloon uprising, the Libertarian Communist Group, and several Bruxellois newspapers at the turn of the century. Apart from new publications, the movement dissipated through the internecine antimilitarism in the interwar period. Several groups emerged mid-century for social justice and anti-fascism.

== Before 1880 ==
=== The Anti-Authoritarian International ===
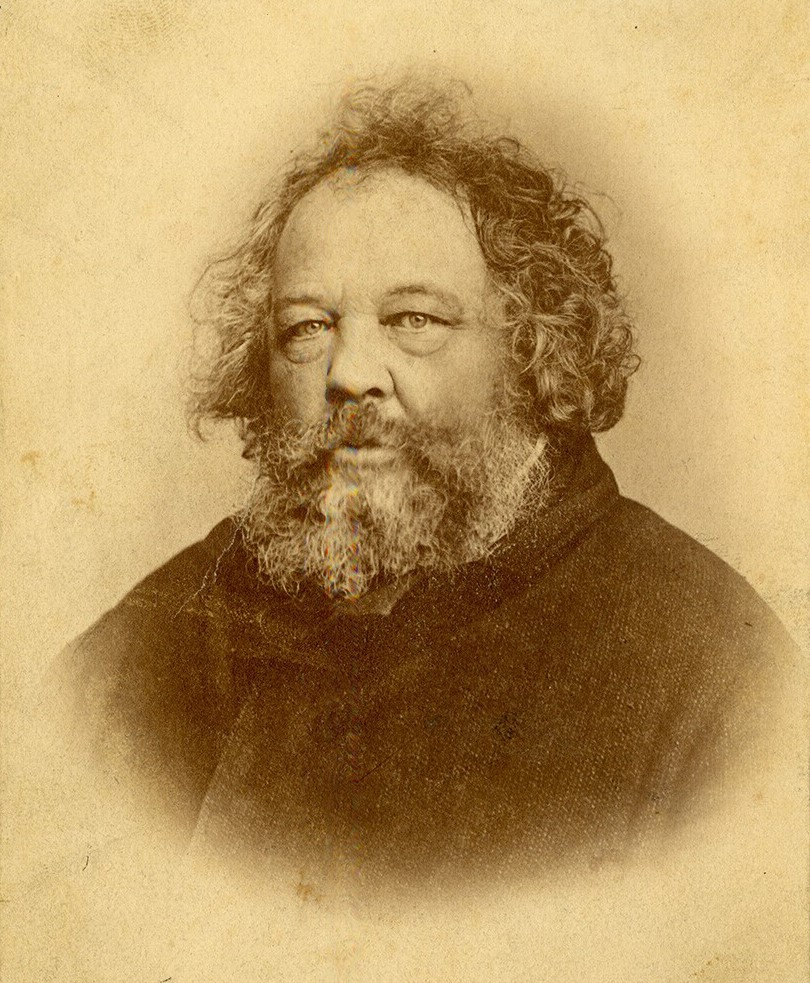
Mikhail Bakunin

In September 1872, during the Hague Congress of the International Workingmen's Association, the Belgian delegates spoke out against the exclusion of Mikhail Bakunin proposed by the General Council of London, dominated by Karl Marx. In this founding conflict of anarchism, they joined the camp of the "anti-authoritarians" against the "authoritarians". Like Bakunin, the Belgian delegates refused to achieve their objectives by conquering political power and were in favor of a federalist structure of the International, in which the local groups retained a large degree of autonomy. According to them, the revolution would take place quickly and a new society would be built from below.

From this split was born, at the congress of Saint-Imier on 15 September 1872, an "anti-authoritarian" International known as the Jura Federation. It was around this that the anarchist current was born, which then claimed to be called "revolutionary collectivism", wanting to be the promoter of a self-managed economic system outside all authority, all centralization, all states and giving as objective "the destruction of all political power by the revolutionary strike". The majority of Belgian members of the First International joined this anti-authoritarian International.

In the mid-1870s, Belgian socialism was made up of a set of workers' associations anxious to maintain their independence and to stay away from politics. The local federation of Verviers was then the center of the anti-authoritarian International in Belgium. It challenged trade unionism and political action to privilege revolutionary propaganda: the abolition of the state must be the top priority. But the announced revolution was long overdue and the social-democratic tendency, particularly present in Ghent and Brussels, gradually won out over the anti-political revolutionary.

=== "Compagnon" ===
The term compagnon ("fellow") by which anarchists refer to themselves was first used in Belgium, said Jean Maitron. "When the republicans," cried Tévenin, judged before the Assize Court of Isère, "wanted to designate themselves separately from the monarchists, they took the name of citizen; we who despise the right of citizenship, we looked for an absolutely working-class term and we adopted that of companion; that means a companion in struggle, in misery, sometimes also in a chain". These companions do not belong to a party, but to local groups without structures and living an independent life.

=== Personalities ===
- Victor Dave, born 25 February 1845 in Jambes and died 31 October 1922 in Paris. He was a libertarian socialist journalist and historian, a member of the Brussels Federation of the International Workingmen's Association. He has published numerous biographies including that of Fernand Pelloutier.
- Eugène Hins, born in Molenbeek in 1839 and died in Brussels in 1923. Professor of medieval history, he was the founder of the newspaper La Pensée, leader of Belgian free thought and co-founder of the International Workingmen's Association.
- Lucien Hénault, born in 1870 and died on 18 June 1914. Doctor and libertarian communist, he participated in the Circle of Socialist Students before founding, in 1900, Le Réveil des Travailleurs. In 1901, he published in Liège, Le Parti ouvrier et anarchie. Having become a chief physician at the Saint-Gilles hospital in Brussels, he moved away from militant action but remained active as a free-thinker. In 1913, he was president of the association Les Amis de l'Orphelinat rationaliste.

== From 1880 to 1914 ==
=== Walloon uprising of 1886 ===
The Walloon uprising of 1886 designated a series of insurrectional workers' strikes that began on 18 March with a commemoration of the 15th anniversary of the Paris Commune, organized by the Revolutionary Anarchist Group of Liège. There were violent clashes between demonstrators and the police, the army was mobilized and the uprising was crushed, causing the deaths of several dozen strikers.

=== The Friendly Federation of Anarchists (1904) ===
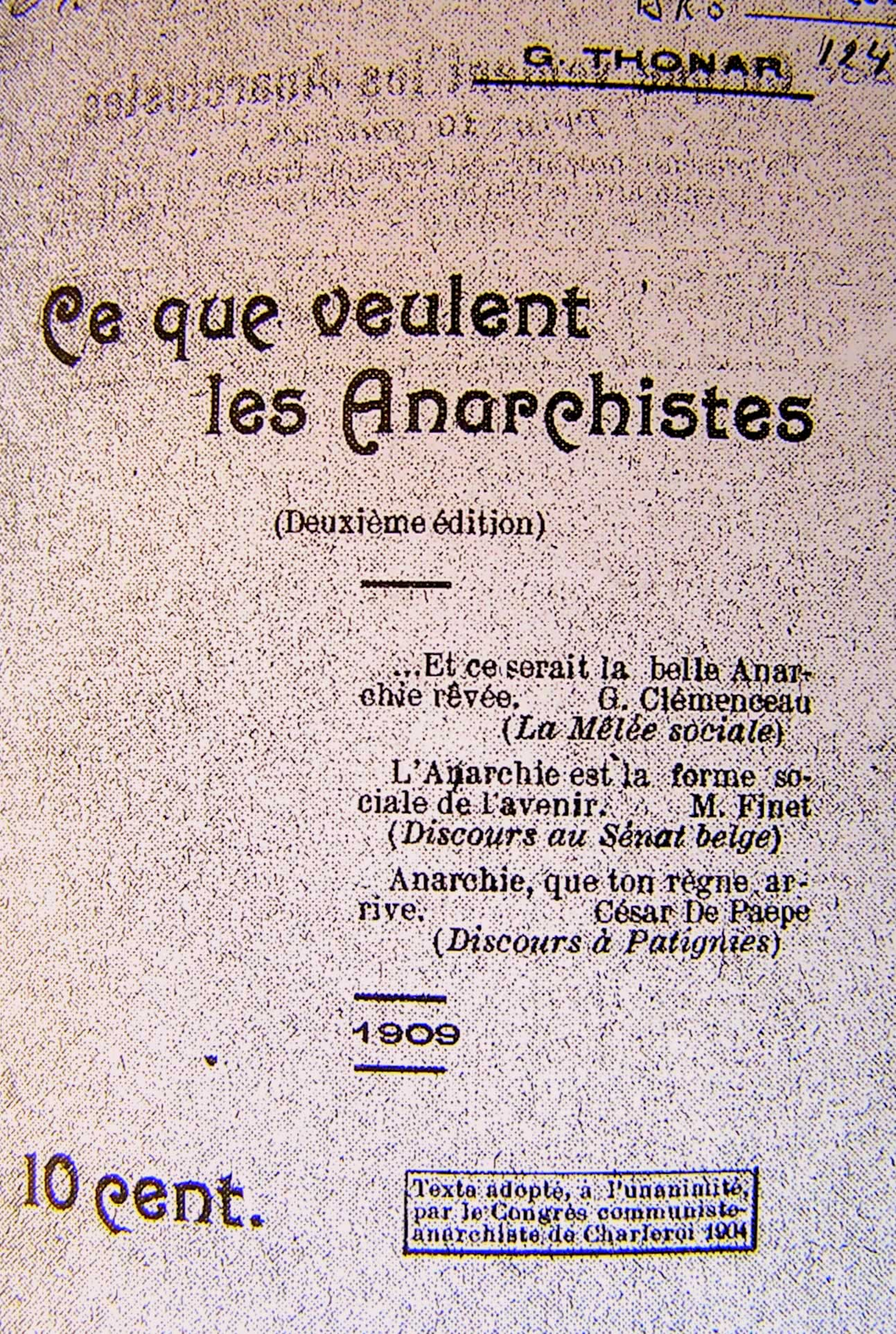
Ce que veulent les anarchistes, réédition de 1909.

In 1902, Georges Thonar chaired the "revolutionary congress" of Liège which was a success of participation but gave few concrete results, in particular because of individualism and the fear of any authoritarianism which paralyzed any beginnings of organization. Dispersed in an multitude of trends, the movement proved incapable of implementing its resolutions, of coordinating its action.

However Thonar continued his project of organizing anarchism. To clarify the positions, he drew up a manifesto, What anarchists want, which excluded from the outset those nostalgic for propaganda of the deed and the "originals" who were not conformist.

For him, anarchism was located in "an active propaganda, purely theoretical and without phrases", aiming at "integral education" through study circles, schools, conferences, newspapers and brochures. To ensure "the development of personal dignity, of the spirit of independence and of feelings of solidarity", such was the immediate objective of group action. Direct action was not neglected, but anarchism knew that "riots" and "revolutions" are not created "artificially"; that "governmental arbitrariness and capitalist exploitation will push the masses that must be educated as a consequence to a gigantic general strike, the prelude to the social revolution". He did not reject any idea of reform because "the educational action of the struggle waged to obtain them is useful to the working class."

In October 1904 in Charleroi and on this basis, Thonar, assisted by Émile Chapelier, brought together a libertarian communist congress of around a hundred fairly representative militants who unanimously adopted his text and laid the foundations for a Friendly Federation of Anarchists.

The objectives were, on the one hand, to bring together the anarchists by means of an organization which allowed them to act more methodically, and, on the other hand, to take concrete measures to develop propaganda, whether through conferences, publications or libraries. The organization project, entirely developed by Georges Thonar, in a way leader of the movement at the time, speaks of a libertarian federalism based on voluntary collaboration: each group and each individual retains its autonomy, and no one imposes decisions (which makes it possible to overcome the reluctance of those who fear the appearance of a certain authoritarianism). The organization of the federation was based on three types of gathering: local sections, study and propaganda circles, intended to train members through conferences on both social and scientific subjects; concentration groups meeting monthly and finally the free federation, without statute, holding an annual congress. The publication of a newsletter informs about the state of propaganda and new publications, and its production is carried out each time by a different group in order to develop contacts and avoid excessive centralization. Thonar was appointed secretary, but he was quickly disappointed because, apart from the holding of an annual congress, few actions were organized collectively.

=== The libertarian community L’Experience (1905–1908) ===
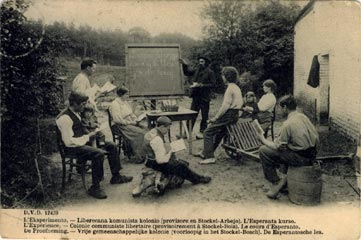
An Esperanto course at the libertarian communist colony, L’Experience.

In July 1905, the libertarian L’Experience community in Stockel, was founded by Émile Chapelier and his partner Marie David (Joseph Jacquemotte's sister). It had five to fifteen people, wanting to be an alternative to propaganda of the deed – what they called "propaganda by example". Victor Serge, Jean de Boë and the Esperantist activist Eugène Gaspard Marin, notably stayed there.

The libertarian communist colony was the Brussels section of the Libertarian Communist Group founded on 25 July 1905 with a view to structuring the movement to carry out joint action and sustained propaganda. Until then, individualism and the fear of authoritarianism had always pushed anarchists to refuse any form of organization.

The project was the implementation of libertarian communism: common property, communal work (gardening and poultry farming essentially) and consumption according to the principle of "From each according to their ability, to each according to their needs". It relied on the principle of mutual aid developed by Peter Kropotkin. It was an open environment, integrated into the Belgian and international anarchist movement, and multiplying activities for those who came to visit it: newspapers, active theater, conferences, etc. On 22 July 1906, the second Belgian Libertarian Communist Congress was held there, which launched the idea of an anarchist international. The colony published multiple brochures, which helped reactivate Belgian and international anarchism, on revolutionary syndicalism, neomalthusianism, Esperanto, free love, etc. It was an assumed experimental environment, not wanting to appear as a model, nor as a fixed structure.

A showcase for anarchism, the colony was open to visitors on Sundays, lectures and plays were given there. The community published many brochures in its collection. On 11 August 1906, it published the first number of the weekly L'Émancipateur.

=== The Libertarian Communist Group (1905–1907) ===
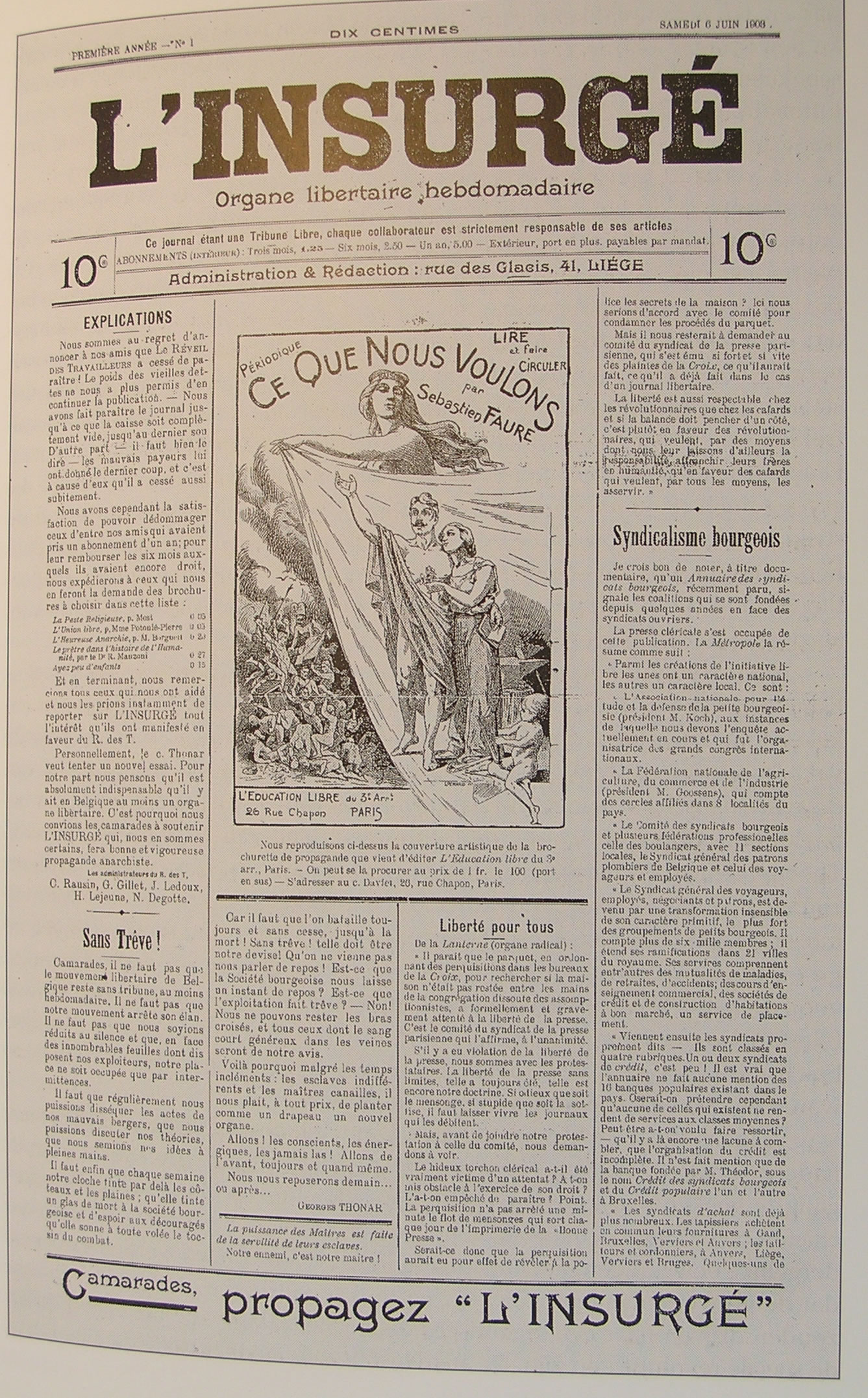
L’Insurgé, 6 June 1903.

The Libertarian Communist Group (French: Groupement Communiste Libertaire, GCL) was a Belgian anarchist organization founded by about thirty militants on 25 July 1905 and disappeared in August 1907. Its goal was to propagate the ideas of libertarian communism by means of meetings, the creation of education circles, and the publication of newspapers and propaganda books. Its main objective was to structure a movement divided into many tendencies and to create the means necessary for the development of the libertarian press. Georges Thonar was its general secretary.

On 15 October, a congress was held in Liège to study two questions: the foundation of a libertarian colony and the attitude to adopt in the event of war. At this congress, Thonar clarified that the group was addressing activists who believed in the need to strengthen the organization of propaganda and solidarity, so the group was relatively closed. The GCL adopted a declaration in which it specified that its aim was to propagate the libertarian communist theories defined by the Declaration of principles adopted at the Congress of Charleroi in 1904.

In July 1905, the libertarian L'Expérance community was created by Émile Chapelier and became the local section of Stockel. At the beginning of 1906, the first results were quite encouraging: the number of members and sections continued to increase. The GCL managed to ensure the survival of L’Insurgé and organized meetings, study circles, and the publication of propaganda books. At that point, the GCL had around 100 activists divided into around 15 sections. The newspaper L'Insurgé, which Thonar launched in 1903, became L’Emancipateur, "Organ of the Groupement Communiste Libertaire" and was published in L'Expérance.

However, the GCL did not alleviate the financial difficulties of the anarchist press, which was one of its primary objectives, and L’Émancipateur, with its 300 subscribers, did not balance its books. Contacts were spaced out between the different sections and Secretary General Georges Thonar lost contact with his base. Finally, the sections reproached the group for its centralizing tendency and decided to dissolve it at the last general assembly in August 1907. However, it was decided to maintain a network woven by the fraternal relations formed between the members during the meetings and that the action must to develop in a new direction: revolutionary syndicalism.

=== The Brussels Revolutionary Group (1907–1909) ===
In July 1908, at the call of the Brussels Revolutionary Group, largely from the L'Experience colony, an anarchist Federation was formed based on "the free membership of groups, without statutes, without regulations and without a committee". It published the newspaper Le Révolté.

=== The Belgian General Confederation of Labor (1906–1908) ===
On 11 and 12 June 1905 in Charleroi, a revolutionary trade union congress brought together delegates from 24 localities, mainly in Hainaut, but also from Ghent, Brussels, and Liège. The delegates included miners, glassmakers, typographers, carpenters, metallurgists and painters. The congress decided on the principle of the creation of a General Confederation of Labour. Following the model of the French CGT, for the new Confederation, it was a question of bringing together all the trades in a single agreement so as to create an anti-political union capable of carrying out the revolutionary general strike. Its goal is the elimination of wage labor. But unlike France, which was industrialized late but where the workers 'groups were nourished by a revolutionary tradition, Belgium, and in particular the Walloon industrial basins, experienced the first industrial revolution on the continent but a workers' movement which is organized late. Local and professional particularism reigned and union membership was very small30.

On 16 July 1905, the first issue of the newspaper L’Action Directe, "organ of workers", then "organ of the General Confederation of Labor" then "organ of revolutionary syndicalist propaganda" appeared in Gilly (Belgium). Founded by Léopold Preumont, from June 1907, Henri Fuss succeeded him at the head of the newspaper which was both a propaganda tool and a rallying center for the unions of Charleroi and Liège, which claim to be in direct action.

On 28 January 1906 in Brussels, the constitutive congress of the new organization was held, a congress prepared by the Union des Travailleurs bruxellois founded by Henri Fuss and in which Georges Thonar and Émile Chapelier joined in particular. The Belgian CGT grew in the following years but its newspaper, L’Action Directe and some of its members were prosecuted on several occasions, in particular because of their anti-militarist positions or their participation in strikes. These lawsuits had the consequence of depriving the movement of its most important activists. These reasons, to which are added a local and professional particularism and the absence of outstanding personalities, caused the end of the CGT in 1908.

=== The Amsterdam International Anarchist Congress (1907) ===
A large Belgian delegation took part in the International Anarchist Congress in Amsterdam in August 1907, including Georges Thonar and Henri Fuss (Liège), Émile Chapelier (Boitsfort), Segher Rabauw and Samson (Antwerp), Janssen and Heiman (Ghent), Schouteten (Brussels), Hamburger and Henri Willems. The Libertarian Communist Group intervened there in particular in the debate on the organization.

=== The Belgian Trade Union Confederation (1908–1910) ===
The Confédération syndicale belge (Belgian Trade Union Confederation) was an Anarcho-syndicalist trade union movement in Belgium. The organization was founded in Liège on 19 April 1908. Confédération syndicale belge was the last of the various anarcho-syndicalist union movements formed in Belgium in the years prior to the First World War. The organization had around 10,000 members from Antwerp, Kortrijk, Brussels, Verviers, the Centre region and Liège. It was formed by the small revolutionary Confédération générale du travail (founded on 28 January 1906 in Brussels), the Antwerp diamond workers union (3,000 members), the glass workers union (Union Verrière) of Lodelinsart and others in reaction to the creation of the Commission syndicale, a trade-union confederation directly linked to, and under the orders of the Belgian Labour Party. In January 1910, the diamond workers union finally joined the Commission syndicale after a mediation by Camille Huysmans and Jan Van Zutphen, general secretary of the diamond general trade union of Amsterdam, the Algemene Nederlandse Diamantbewerkersbond. This ended the history of the Confédération syndicale belge, the last attempt to create a trade union independent from the Belgian Labour Party.

=== Publications ===
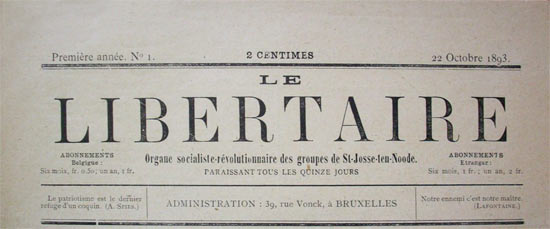
Le Libertaire, no 1, 22 October 1893.

On 22 October 1893 in Brussels, Henri Willems published the first issue of the bimonthly Le Libertaire, the "Socialist-revolutionary organ of the groups of Saint-Josse-ten-Noode", in Brussels. It contained two epigrams: "Patriotism is the last refuge of a rascal" by August Spies and "Our enemy is our master" by Jean de La Fontaine, and followed the newspaper L'Antipatriote. However, its printer and publisher were prosecuted in 1894 for press offenses, which led to the stopping of publication of the newspaper.

The first issue of La Débâcle sociale was published on 4 January 1896 in Ensival. Originally published every two weeks, from issue 6 ( 22–29 March 1896), it became a weekly. Among the contributors: Henri Zisly, Henri Beylie, Émile Gravelle, Jules Moineau, Augustin Hamon, Élisée Reclus and Séverine. After 10 issues, the newspaper stopped on 19 April 1896. In March 1896, La Débâcle sociale also published in the form of a brochure, the plea by Émile Royer, Pour l´anarchiste Jules Moineau.

In 1910, the Revolutionary Federation published the newspaper Le combat social, the leader of which was Félix Springael. In the first issue, published under the title of Bulletin of the Revolutionary Federation, the Revolutionary Federation declared itself for integral socialism, for a society in which everyone produces according to their strength and consumes according to their needs.

On 1 November 1902 in Brussels, the first issue of the newspaper Le Flambeau, "Organe de combat Révolutionnaire", came out, edited by Julius Mestag. "Le Flambeau is not a journal of theory, nor a gossip sheet, it is a revolutionary combat organ, the cry of the oppressed, the expression of a feeling of revolt."

==== L’Émancipateur ====
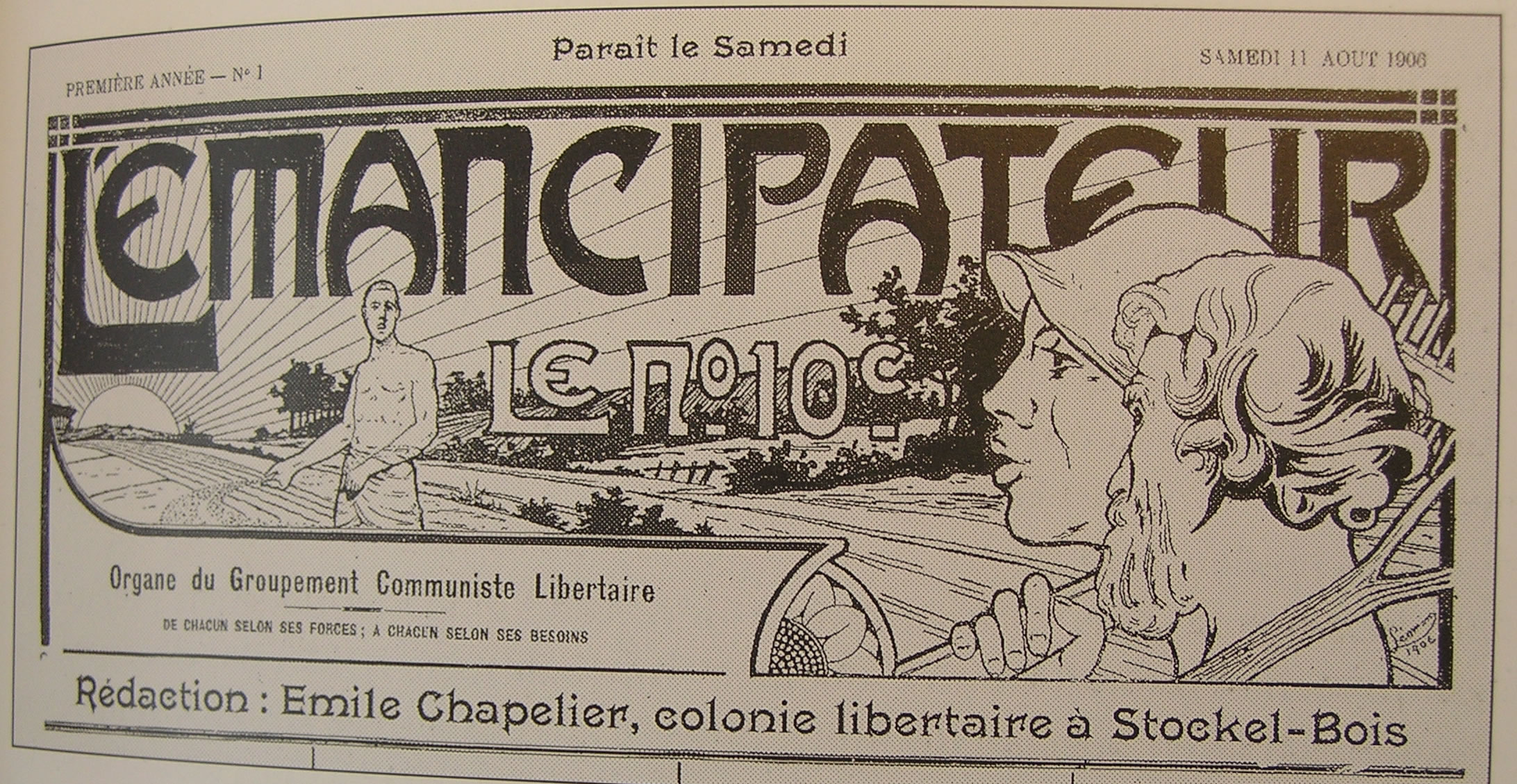
L’Émancipateur (first period), 11 August 1906, "Organ of the Groupement Communiste Libertaire" published by the libertarian community L’experiment.

On 11 August 1906, the first issue of the weekly L'Émancipateur, "Organ of the Groupement Communiste Libertaire", published by the libertarian colony founded by Émile Chapelier, was published in Stockel. Georges Thonar was its administrator and printer. The newspaper ceased to appear in December 1906 after 13 issues appeared. The newspaper Le Communiste succeeded it in June 1907. Its epigraph was "from each according to their ability; to each according to their needs".

On 18 September 1910, the first issue of the second period of L'Émancipateur "Communist-anarchist revolutionary organ" came out in Liège. The managing editor responsible for the newspaper was François Requilez. The journal was edited from number 24 by the group The Seekers of Truth. Fifty two issues appeared until March 1913. The newspaper was replaced from this date and until July 1913 by L'action anarchiste. L’Émancipateur reappeared in March 1914 for a new series of twelve issues, until 2 August 1914. Its epigraph was: "We want to establish a social environment which ensures to each individual all the sum of happiness adequate for the progressive development of humanity".

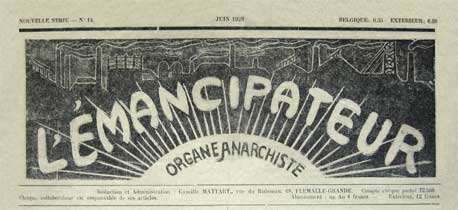
L’Emancipateur (third period), 1921–1936, published by Camille Mattart in Flémalle.

In July 1921, the first issue of the third period of L'Émancipateur, first subtitled "Organe communiste-anarchiste Révolutionnaire", was published by Camille Mattart in Flémalle. After becoming the newspaper of the Libertarian Communist Federation, the title disappeared in December 1925 to make way for the newspaper Le Combat. Camille Mattart then republished it periodically from 1928 to 1936.

=== Personalities ===
- Henri Willems, born 21 October 1858 in Saint-Josse-ten-Noode, is a sculptor, anarchist activist and administrator of the newspapers Le Libertaire and L'Antipatriote. He was sentenced in 1894 for press offenses.

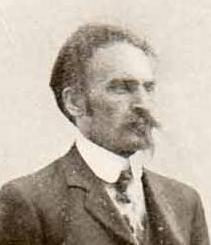
Émile Chapelier.

- Émile Chapelier, born in 1870 and died on 16 March 1933 in Brussels. A minor worker, self-taught, prolific writer and libertarian communist activist, in 1905 he inspired the libertarian community L’experiment in Brussels. A central figure in Belgian anarchism before World War I, he ended up joining the Belgian Workers' Party in 1908–1909 while defending extreme left positions inspired by French revolutionary syndicalism.
- Georges Thonar whose real name is Gérard Debehognes, born 3 March 1875 in Huy and died at the beginning of December 1918 in Gironde. He was a typographer, printer, and a libertarian communist activist. He was a central figure in Belgian anarchism before World War I. He owes his notoriety in particular to two texts, reissued on numerous occasions, Ce que veulent les anarchistes and Le parlementarisme et la classe ouvrière. In 1905, he was the linchpin of the Libertarian Communist Group, the objective of which was to organize the anarchist movement in Belgium and which was at the origin of the Libertarian Communist Colony, L'Experience in Stockel.
- Raymond Callemin, born in Brussels on 26 March 1890 and died in Paris on 21 April 1913. Typographer, individualist anarchist, he contributed in 1911 in Paris to the newspaper L'Anarchie. Illegalist and member of the Bonnot Gang, better known by the nickname Raymond la Science, he was guillotined in Paris, in front of the doors of La Santé Prison.
- Henri Fuss, born 4 August 1885 in Schaerbeek and died in September 1964 in Brussels. Typographer, revolutionary and libertarian trade unionist, founder of the Brussels Workers Union with Georges Thonar and Émile Chapelier. In 1905, he edited L’Action Directe, which became the organ of the General Confederation of Labour. An atypical figure, he abandoned brilliant university studies in 1903 to join the corporation of typographers, the center of anarchism. He was condemned to prison in 1906 as a refractor to military service, he enlisted as a volunteer in the Belgian army in 1917 to fight against "German imperialism"; an ideologist of revolutionary unionism at the start of the 20th century, he was one of the founding fathers of the social security system set up in Belgium, in the wake of the resistance, after World War II.

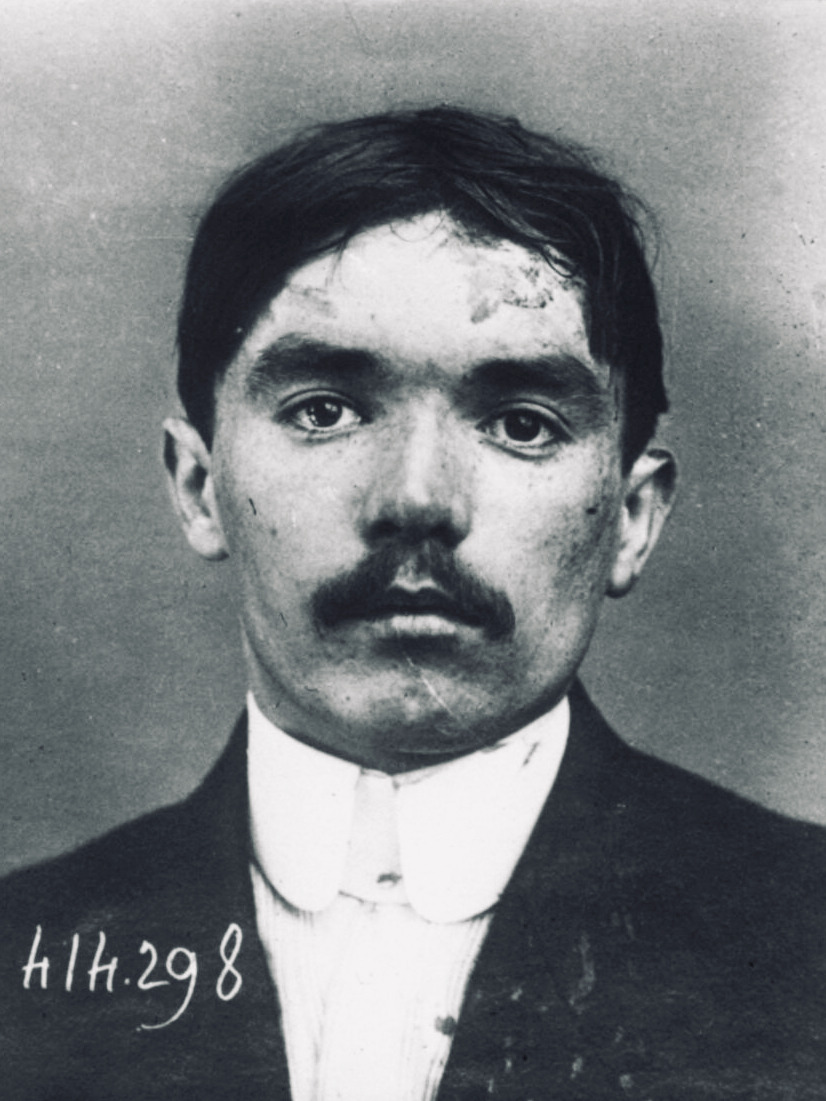
Jean De Boë.

- Jean De Boë, born 20 March 1889 in Anderlecht and died 2 January 1974 in Watermael-Boitsfort. Typographer, libertarian and anarcho-syndicalist activist, founder of the Unified Book and Paper Union of Brussels then President of the National Central Book Industry from 1945 to 1954 and secretary of the International Graphic Federation. On 28 February 1912, he was arrested for his activities in the Bonnot Gang and was sentenced to 10 years of forced labor. In 1922, he escaped from the penal colony of French Guiana to reach Belgium where he was involved in union activities, while continuing his commitment to the libertarian movement until his death.
- Jacques Mesnil, born in Brussels on 9 July 1872 and died in France on 14 November 1940. Journalist, art critic and scholar of the Florentine Renaissance. He met Errico Malatesta in Italy and Élisée Reclus in Brussels. After World War I, he moved towards communism while remaining fundamentally libertarian. Living in France, he was excluded from the editorial staff of L'Humanité in 1924 and participated in La Révolution prolétarienne by Pierre Monatte.
- Mathieu Demoulin, founder of the timber workers union in Liège and administrator, until 1914, of the newspaper L'Action Ouvrière, a revolutionary trade unionist whose goal "is and will remain the suppression of the wage system and the creation of a society without masters."
- Fernand Rocourt, member of the Flémalle Grande group, on 7 January 1913, he participated in the Congress of the Belgian Anarchist Union. In 1937–1938, he contributed to the Monthly Bulletin of L’Émancipateur, the main editor of which was Camille Mattart.
- Emmanuel Tesch, a student in Saint-Gilles, he was reported by the police as a member of the revolutionary syndicalist group and collaborator of the review La Société Nouvelle. He contributes to L’Utopie edited by Henri Fuss as well as L’Action directe of the Belgian CGT. He wrote the preface of Émile Chapelier's pamphlet on the libertarian communist colony L’Experience in 1906.
- Jules Moineau, sentenced in 1892 to 25 years of hard labor for "theft of dynamite and conspiracy". He was one of the signatories of the Manifesto of the Sixteen.
- Max Borgueil (1877–1932), libertarian poet and novelist, he collaborated on many titles in the Belgian anarchist press.

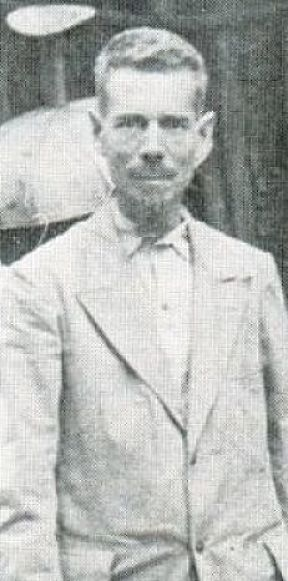
Gassy Marin

- Gassy Marin (1883–1969), painter-decorator, typographer, libertarian and Esperantist, was a pioneer of the libertarian communities movement.

== From 1914 to 1945 ==
Like the international movement, the libertarian movement emerged from the First World War divided, fractured between radical antimilitarists and supporters of a victory for Western democracies gathered around the Manifesto of the Sixteen. World War I was undoubtedly a fatal halt to the development of anarchism all over the world. In Belgium, while until 1914, the libertarian movement was the first censor on the left of the Workers' Party, it gradually lost its influence. The Russian Revolution of October 1917 aroused enthusiasm among some who joined the communist movements, while others realized the true dictatorial nature of the new Bolshevik power.

Most Belgian anarchists then embarked on newspaper publication. Belgium, during the interwar period, was a land of exile and Belgian militants of this generation welcomed and helped many exiles living in semi-clandestinity: Italian, German and Spanish anarchists, Jews, conscientious objectors, neo-Malthusians, etc. The movement was influenced by the arrival of Italian exiles fleeing fascism or immigrants seeking work: five anarchist magazines in the Italian language were published in Brussels in the interwar period. Some local activists collaborated on these publications and sometimes edited them, such as Hem Day or Jean De Boë.

In 1921, a Belgian Anarchist Communist Federation initially brought together three groups in Brussels, Liège and in the Borinage.

In 1924, Hem Day welcomed the Spanish anarcho-syndicalists Francisco Ascaso and Buenaventura Durruti, then on the run to Cuba, into his home for two years. In 1928, the International Committee for Anarchist Defense (CIDA) was created to fight against the expulsions and extraditions of foreign anarchists. A support network was set up around CIDA for many militants living in semi-clandestinity and an exfiltration channel towards South America.

=== Personalities ===
- Jean-Baptiste Schaut (Adamas), born to Belgian parents on 6 August 1869 in Roubaix and died on 2 August 1953. In 1893, newsagent in Ghent, he was active in the trade union movement and reported, in February 1909, as having spoken in Flemish under the pseudonym of Adamas during a meeting in Brussels. He was the delegate of Ghent at the Belgian anarchist congress held on 25 December 1925 in which twenty six delegates participated and where Hem Day was appointed secretary of the Federation of anarchist groups which published L'Émancipateur then Le Combat journal to which Adamas regularly contributed in 1926–1927. In 1926 he was a member of the French Anarchist Communist Union (French: Union Anarchiste Communiste, UAC) and in August participated in a rally in support of Sacco and Vanzetti. In the early 1950s, Adamas took part in Action Commune Libertaire.
- Léopold Preumont, born in Charleroi in 1874 and died in September 1912, miner, anarchist and trade unionist.

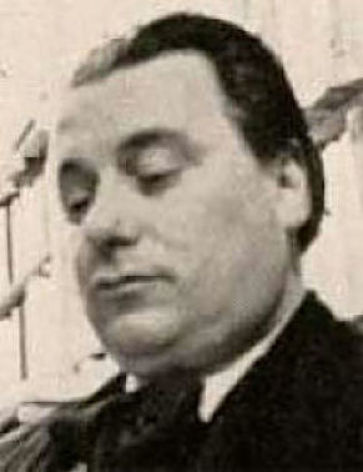
Hem Day

- Marcel Dieu (Hem Day), born 30 May 1902 and died 14 August 1969. He was a bookseller, freemason, anarchist activist since World War I. He contributed to numerous magazines throughout the interwar period and ended up creating his own to disseminate his anti-communist, anti-fascist and pacifist propaganda. In 1933, with Léo Campion, they returned their military notebook to the Minister of National Defense to release themselves from all military obligations and thus signal their refusal to participate in the wars to come. They were finally, after a few months in prison, expelled from the army. During the Spanish Civil War, he went to Barcelona to work on revolutionary anarchist propaganda in a peaceful and non-violent manner. Back in Belgium, he devoted himself entirely to propaganda, continued his publications and gave numerous conferences until his death. He carried out research on various subjects and became an intellectual reference for some.

== From 1945 to the 1960s ==
As after World War I, Belgian anarchism emerged shaken from World War II. However, as soon as the last battles had been fought, attempts to rebuild the movement appear. Even if they did not define themselves specifically as an anarchist, by welcoming libertarians and letting them express themselves, several groups participated in this libertarian renewal. Their purpose was social justice, pacifism, anti-militarism, anti-fascism, etc.

=== Les Cahiers socialistes ===
Without being specifically anarchists, Les Cahiers socialistes, founded in November 1944, brought together independent socialists of all stripes and maintained close relations with groups clearly claiming to be part of the libertarian movement and welcomed in its editorial committee, in 1947, an anarchist activist like Ernestan.

The editorial line of the review advocated a libertarian socialism that attempts a critical approach to Marxism. For its authors, the very essence of Marxism has been obscured by the too rigid doctrine of political parties. It was important to give more freedom to the socialists, as to the workers. This resolutely libertarian approach led them to adopt a rather nuanced point of view with regard to the debate on the role of the State, a conflict which is at the basis of the split of the First International. For Les Cahiers socialistes, the authoritarian socialists, by retaining the notion of the State, perpetuate an oppressive system, while in reaction, the anarchists advocate a "petty-bourgeois" individualism. The solution, according to them, lay in an alternative: self-management. The journal was certainly not presented as statist, for its authors, the state was neither a form of socialism nor a means of achieving it. Les Cahiers socialistes believed that each individual had the right to assert their socialist ideal and was categorically opposed to authoritarianism.

=== Pensée et Action ===
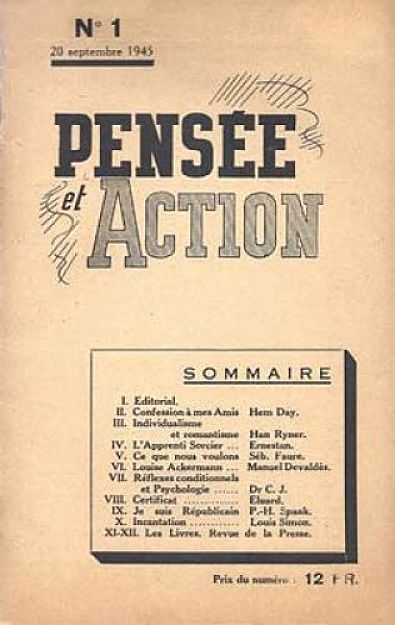
Pensée et Action, no 1, 20 September 1945.

The Pensée et Action group was founded on 28 March 1945 following a conference by its leader, Marcel Dieu. The aim of the group was "to awaken and develop individual and intellectual consciousness to fight against all forms of authoritarianism". The group organized more than a hundred conferences on fields as diverse as sociology, politics, economics, psychology, literature, philosophy, sciences, Fine Arts, etc. The talks were attended by around thirty spectators, sometimes around a hundred.

The group publishes an eponymous monthly review which should serve as "a link between all those who, beyond the fray of today and tomorrow, are looking for the possible bases of a free evolution of men in societies". It therefore declared itself open to all, as attested by the formula written on the back cover of each issue of the review: "Pensée et Action intends to seek, beyond any sectarianism, any political or dogmatic ideology, the elements of a genuinely revolutionary culture, defending the merits of the essential demands of the mind and of men!" Forty-six issues were published between September 1945 and December 1952. From that date until 1970, the review was replaced by Les Cahiers de Pensée et Action.

=== Action commune libertaire ===
Action commune libertaire was founded on 2 November 1952, at the call of the libertarian trade unionist Jean De Boë. In addition to Alfred Lepape (Dour) who was the responsible editor and secretary of the group's publications, Guy Badot (Charleroi), Hem Day (Brussels), Georges Simon (Quaregnon), Joseph De Smet (Ghent), Luis Broecke (Antwerp) and Jean-Baptiste Schaut (Liège) were also members of the group.

The association brought together anarchists of all tendencies and sets itself the objective of providing information intended for a large public. It published pacifist and anti-militarist posters and leaflets, recurring themes among libertarians of this generation. The group was quickly undermined by divisions between individualists, including Hem Day and Joseph de Smet, and the libertarian communist fringe. After 1954 and a few rescue attempts, the group disappeared.

=== International Anti-Fascist Solidarity (SIA) ===
The Belgian section of International Antifascist Solidarity (SIA) was founded on 18 May 1946 in the form of an association. It brought together anti-fascists and anti-Stalinists around the founders: Joseph De Smet and especially Jean De Boë. The association organized the defense of asylum seekers who had fled their country and authoritarian regimes. It was a meeting place for immigrants, including the many anarcho-syndicalists from the National Confederation of Labor (CNT) in exile.

In addition to its activities and galas, the association published brochures and leaflets during important events such as in 1960. For example, at the wedding of Baudouin, the young Belgian king, with Fabiola, from the Spanish nobility, the association denounced the living conditions under the Franco dictatorship and the passive collaboration of the royal family and clerical circles.

In 1958, young people, including Stéphane Huvenne, joined the association and offered to organize more spectacular or even violent actions, which caused tensions between the new and the old generation mainly made up of non-violent activists. The young Spanish anti-fascists decided to leave SIA and to join the Libertarian Youth (FIJL), then in exile on Belgian territory since its ban in France on 9 August 1963.

=== War Resisters' International (WRI) ===
The War Resisters' International logo: a broken rifle.

Without being specifically anarchist, the Belgian section of the War Resisters' International (IRG) brought together many libertarians. Pacifist and antimilitarist, the IRG was the only association which did not base its rejection of war on foundations of a religious nature. It advocated an integral nonviolent pacifism: "War is a crime against Humanity. For this reason, we are determined not to help any kind of war and to fight for the abolition of all its causes”. The IRG provides concrete support to people who resist militarism and conscription (rebels, conscientious objectors, etc.) and, on a more philosophical level, advocates for "a world without war and a new social order, where all cooperate for the common good”.

Two personalities of the libertarian movement took responsibilities at the international level: Hem Day and Jean Van Lierde. The group published the newsletter Non-violence et Société. The action that most mobilized the pacifists of the IRG was the struggle for the recognition of the status of conscientious objector and, in return, the creation of a civilian service. Some libertarians wonder about the value of this status, official recognition by the powers in place, and, even more, about the legitimacy of a civil service, which constituted participation in the workings of the state.

=== Personalities ===
- Jean Van Lierde born 15 February 1926 in Charleroi and died 15 December 2006. A pacifist and anti-militarist activist, he defined himself as both a Christian and libertarian activist. He is considered to be the initiator of the conscientious objection statute in Belgium.
- Alfred Lepape, born in 1925 and died in 1996. Anarchist and pacifist militant of Borinage. He joined the libertarian movement at the end of World War II and was active until 1975. He was the secretary of the Action commune libertaire, and contributed to the Cahiers de l'Humanisme libertaire by Gaston Leval. In 1973, he published four pages on the History of the Belgian libertarian movement.
- Louis Bonfanti, French, a conscientious objector in 1939, he was considered a deserter by the French army. He took refuge in Belgium, initially with Hem Day, and at the end of the war became involved in the anarcho-pacifist movement.
- Corrado Perissino, born 11 December 1914. Italian activist, he immigrated to Belgium and was active in the libertarian and anti-fascist circles of the 1930s. In 1941, he was arrested by the Nazis at the request of Fascist Italy. Released, he continued his activity in Belgium.
- Bernard Salmon, died 8 April 1979. A pacifist anarchist and French freemason, he contributed to various reviews. He was the correspondent and manager of Pensée et Action in France.
- Jean Cordier, born in La Louvière on 12 June 1919 and died in Uccle on 30 May 1999. He was a doctor, freemason, pacifist and individualist anarchist.

== From the 1960s to 2000s ==
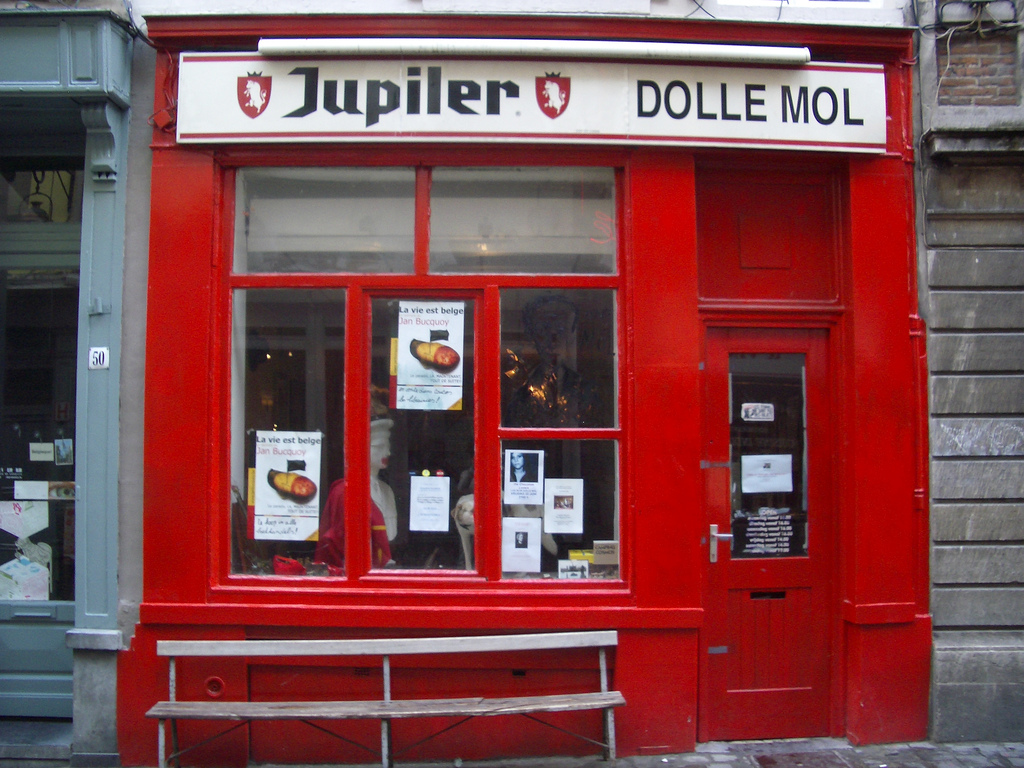
The Dolle Mol in June 2007.

The leftist movement of the years after May 68 was marked by the influence of anarchism, in particular by spontaneism, horizontality, direct democracy and direct action. In Liège, in the wake of the events of May 68 and the student movement Boule de neige, the anarchist monthly "Le Libertaire" was published, in which Noël Godin, Edgard Morin, JP Delriviere, Mihaili Djosson and Yves Thelen participated. The latter, in issue 7 February 1969, wrote the "Manifesto of the Libertarian" which specified the line of the monthly under the title "What is anarchism".

=== Socialisme et Liberté ===
“Socialisme et Liberté" was created in 1966 by François Destryker, but it differed from the rest of the libertarian milieu in Brussels. At the time, a few comrades disseminated libertarian ideas in isolation. "L'Ordre Libre", an organ of the Cercle La Boétie, had been distributed by Jean De Smet since 1960. In November 1965, issue 2 of this review appeared, which tells us about the liquidation of the Institute of Possibilities. There was also a Libertarian Center, in premises rented by the Brussels CNT, near the Grand-Place in Brussels.

The CNT brought together other comrades. For his part, Hem Day ran the review "Pensée et Action" and kept alive the libertarian tradition within the pacifist movement and Freemasonry. The anarchist movement in the 1960s was therefore limited to a few individuals whose visions for the future were limited to rehashing the past. "Socialisme et Liberté" also made contact with CRIFA: Commission des relations de l’ Internationale des Federations anarchistes, in France.

“Socialisme et Liberté” defended the following positions:

- opposition to the USSR and China, as supposedly socialist countries,
- the recognition of historical materialism to understand the evolution of capitalism,
- the insistence on the working class factor as an element of revolutionary change,
- a question about unions,
- the need for political organization as a hub for regrouping revolutionary elements,
- opposition to Hem Day's individualistic views and his involvement in Freemasonry.

May 68 brought with it the anarchist discovery of council communism. The activists of Socialisme et Liberté were active during the Free Assemblies organized at ULB. In 1969, "Socialisme et Liberté" took part in the organization of the international meeting of ICO (Information Correspondence Ouvrière) in Brussels. This meeting takes place at the Auberge de la Paix, bringing together around a hundred participants. Daniel Cohn-Bendit was present, as well as other participants of May 68. The group "Socialism and Freedom" was influenced by "Noir & Rouge", which proclaimed itself anarchist-communist and many texts, in the review, alluded to contributions of dialectical materialism. "Noir & Rouge" approached anarchism critically and dismantled Russian mystification. The ICO criticized the unions as a cog in the state apparatus and thus answered a fundamental question about the nature of the USSR. Noir & Rouge had 46 issues, going from simple mimeographed sheets to a printed pamphlet format. It had a relative influence during the events of May 1968, Daniel Cohn-Bendit frequented this group. From this moment, "Socialisme et Liberté" argued the question of the nature of unions, that of anarcho-syndicalism. Within "Socialisme et Liberté" an important political deepening was being developed, without however arriving at an autonomous theorization.

=== L'Alliance ===
Alliance 89 was founded on 7 January 1969, its main objective was to inform and collect documentation on the anti-authoritarian movement in Belgium. With this in mind, it created a documentation center as well as a library which was in its premises at the Maison de la Paix in Ixelles.

Its work was not limited to maintaining a library, the Alliance also published brochures by well-known anarchist authors as well as its own newsletter. The Alliance library attempted to bring together libertarian works. It was formed in the wake of Socialisme et Liberté. It was being developed in a room at the Maison de la Paix, in Ixelles. It was associated with CIRA in Lausanne. With the Alliance, a crossroads was created for meetings. This was the reflexive axis from which various groups claiming to be part of the libertarian movement formed, developed, and disappeared. But the Alliance continued to refer to Daniel Guérin. The name of the association referred to the name of the group created by Mikhail Bakunin within the First International. The association's goal was "to work on the cultural level for the free development of the human person". Concretely, the group's mission was to provide the most precise and complete documentation possible to activists, supporters, students or researchers wishing to learn about the anarchist movement, its press, its literature and its actions. To do this, it set up a library containing a large number of books and publications on this subject. Its action also included the publication of publications, periodical or not, the organization of conferences, debates, meetings and seminars. Finally, the association supported free education centers or community houses.

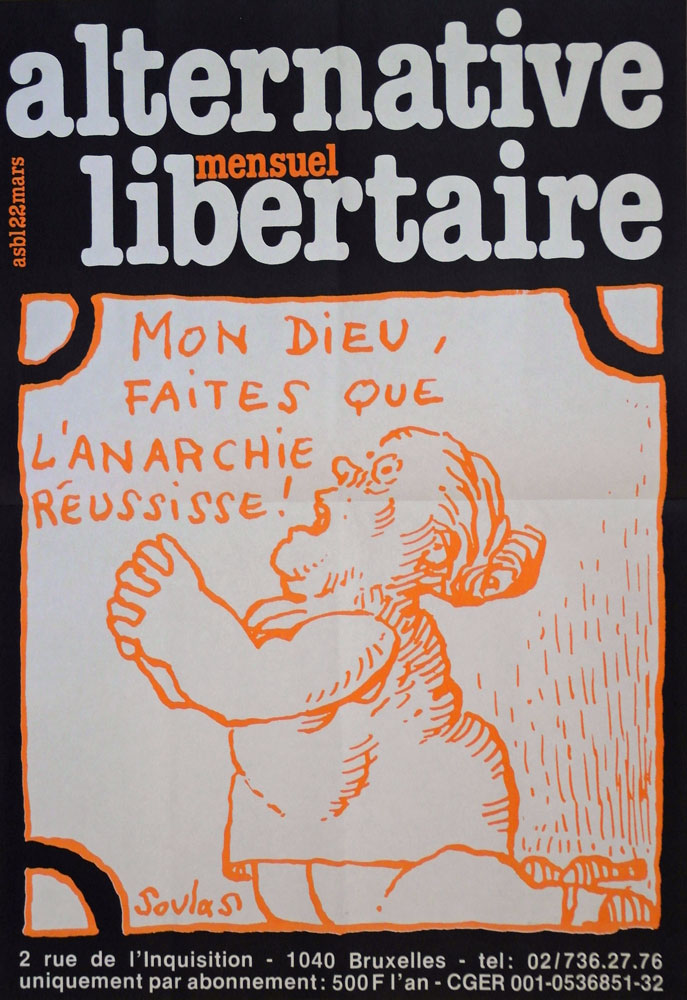
Alternative libertaire poster from 1985.

A Hem Day Fund committee was also created to manage the documents offered by the anarchist. It was made up of Jean Cordier, Jean Van Lierde, Jean Thys and François Destryker. Indeed, before his death, the anarchist had expressed the wish that his collections be entrusted to the Royal Library. The committee responsible for this fund within the Alliance took a whole series of steps to ensure that these were integrated as quickly as possible into the Albertine's collections. The committee also suggested that officials of the Royal Library provide them with the help of a libertarian objector to speed up the classification of this collection.

=== Alternative Libertaire ===
Alternative Libertaire was a monthly newspaper published in Belgium from 1975 to 2005. For the duration of its publication (30 years and 282 issues), its openness to debates and its posters contributed to broadening the audience of libertarian ideas in French-speaking Belgium.

The richness and notoriety of Alternative Libertaire was due to the many links that the newspaper forged over time. Alternative Libertaire was a newspaper written by its readers. A dissident newspaper for different readers. It was a newspaper that wanted to be open to debate. Its goal was not to address convinced activists but to reach out to the periphery of the movement, that is to say the supporters who hesitate to get involved or who by their ideas are interested in libertarian or anti-authoritarian practices.

The visibility of the newspaper was such that even today, it is not uncommon to see copies of its very popular posters or placards in bars, associations, libraries or even schools. The openness of the newspaper led the libertarian movement to leave its groupuscular tendencies and played a big role in the propagation of libertarian ideas.

=== Union Communiste Libertaire Bruxelles ===
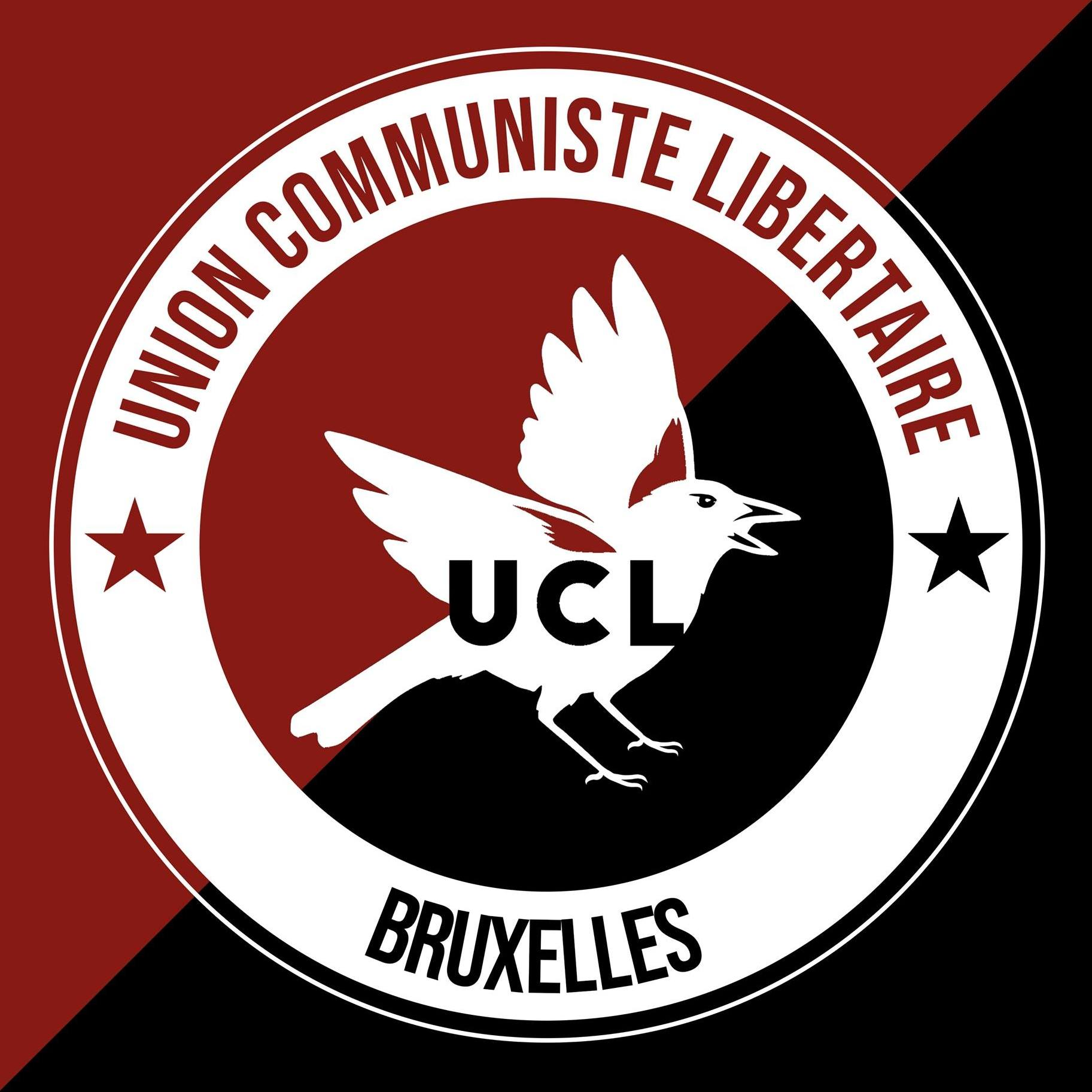
Logo of the Union communiste libertaire

The Union Communiste Libertaire Bruxelles is a local Brussels group that is part of the French-speaking anarcho-communist federation Union communiste libertaire.

In March 2013, Brussels anarcho-communist activists in contact with the French organisation Alternative libertaire founded a local group Alternative Libertaire Bruxelles.

In March 2018, the Brussels collective adopted the operating principles of anarchist “specifism” (Especifismo). The aim is to strengthen the structure of the organisation and to facilitate the insertion of anarchist activists within social movements.

The organisation is structured in thematic fronts of struggle (trade union, feminist, antifascist, queer, social ecology) which aim to coordinate and implement the political line decided by the collective.

Following the merger of Alternative Libertaire and the Coordination des Groupes Anarchistes in 2019, a new anarcho-communist organisation is founded L'Union Communiste Libertaire. The local Brussels group then takes the name of Union Communiste Libertaire Bruxelles.

=== Personalities ===
- François Destryker, born in 1944. He was 17 during the Belgian general strike of 1960–1961 and was very impressed by the radical wave of the social movement against the government. Four years later, in 1965, he graduated, received the Francisco Ferrer Prize for Secular Morals and made contact with the libertarian movement. He was called to perform his military service in 1967, so he requested the status of conscientious objector, which was refused to him as his motivations were political. He was one of the founders of the Socialisme et Liberté circle and of Alliance 89. Influenced by the French historian of anarchism, Daniel Guérin, he defended a rapprochement between anarchism and Marxism. As a libertarian Marxist, he gradually broke away from anarchist ideas to join the councilist current.
- Roger Noël (Babar), born in 1955. Printer, poster artist, publisher and libertarian socialist activist. From 1977 to 2002, he ran the Alternative Libertaire newspaper. In 1978, he initiated the free radio movement in Belgium. In 1982, he was imprisoned for several months in Poland for having smuggled there a radio transmitter intended for the then underground Solidarność union.
- Chiquet Mawet, at the same time a playwright, storyteller, poet, social activist and professor of ethics. At 30, she was one of the pioneers of the anti-nuclear movement in Belgium. At 50, she was one of the pillars of the Alternative Libertaire newspaper.
- Yves Le Manach, Parisian of Breton origin, writer and adopted Brussels resident, was a fitter who left the factory to pursue writing.

== See also ==
- Category:Belgian anarchists
- List of anarchist movements by region
- Anarchism in France
- Anarchism in the Netherlands

== Bibliography ==
=== In French ===
- Jan Moulaert, Le mouvement anarchiste en Belgique 1870–1914, Quorum, 1996, ISBN 9782930014739, extraits en ligne
- Jan Moulaert, La peur du rouge et du noir : la genèse du péril anarchiste en Belgique, in La peur du rouge, Pascal Delwit et José Gotovitch, Université libre de Bruxelles, 1996.
- Nicolas Inghels, Le mouvement anarchiste en Belgique francophone de 1945 à 1970, Mémoire de licence en Histoire contemporaine, sous la direction de José Gotovitch, Université libre de Bruxelles, 2002, texte intégral & texte intégral.
- Nicolas Inghels, Histoire du mouvement anarchiste en Belgique francophone de 1945 à aujourd'hui, revue Dissidences, 3 novembre 2011, lire en ligne.
- Jean De Meur, L'Anarchisme [en Belgique] ou la contestation permanente, Bruxelles, De Méyère, 1970, Centre International de Recherches sur l'Anarchisme (Lausanne), notice bibliographique.
- Anton Constandse, L'anarchisme en Belgique in L'anarchisme aux Pays-Bas et en Flandre, Septentrion, 1980, lire en ligne.
- Anne Morelli, José Gotovitch, Contester dans un pays prospère: l'extrême gauche en Belgique et au Canada, Peter Lang, Collection Études Canadiennes, Canadian Studies, volume 6, 2007, Bruxelles, Bern, Berlin, Frankfurt am Main, New York, Oxford, Wien, 2007, 259 pages, ISBN 978-90-5201-309-1, lire en ligne.
- Jacques Gillen, Les activités en Belgique d’un anthropologue anarchiste : Eugène Gaspard Marin (1883–1969), Mémoire de licence en Histoire contemporaine, sous la direction de Anne Morelli, Université libre de Bruxelles, 1996–1997, texte intégral.
- Collectif, Dictionnaire biographique des militants du mouvement ouvrier en Belgique, Bruxelles, Éditions Vie ouvrière, 1995.
- Mundaneum : Fonds et collections relatifs à l’anarchisme.
- Pieter Ballon, Le mouvement syndicaliste révolutionnaire à Liège pendant l'entre-deux-guerres, Revue Belge d’histoire contemporaine, XXVIII, 1998, texte intégral.
- Michel Antony, Anarchisme belge, mouvements et utopies libertaires, lien vers texte intégra.
- Didier Karolinski, Le mouvement anarchiste en Wallonie et à Bruxelles, mémoire de licence, Université de Liège, 1983.
- Biographie nationale de Belgique et Nouvelle Biographie Nationale, Académie Royale de Belgique, table alphabétique des notices.
- Maxime Steinberg, À l'origine du communisme belge : l'extrême-gauche révolutionnaire d'avant 1914, Les Cahiers Marxistes, Le Mouvement social, December 1970, texte intégral.
- Jacques Cordier, Littérature prolétarienne en Wallonie, Éditions Plein Chant, 1983.
- Jean Puissant, Introduction du Dictionnaire biographique du mouvement ouvrier en Belgique, Dictionnaire biographique, mouvement ouvrier, mouvement social, lire en ligne.

=== In Dutch ===
- Jan Moulaert, « Anarchie, que ton règne arrive ! » : De anarchistische beweging in België 1880–1914, Thèse de doctorat, Katholieke Universiteit Leuven, 1993.
- Pieter Ballon, « Et le verbe sera haïr » : De revolutionair-syndikalistische beweging in Luik tijdens het interbellum, Mémoire de licence, Katholieke Universiteit Leuven, 1995.
- Peter De Lannoy, Anarchisme in België tijdens het interbellum : Organisatorische onmacht troef, Mémoire de licence, Vrije Universiteit Brussel, 1993.
- Fonds Jan Pellering : Anarchisten actief in België, biografische aantekeningen.
- Fonds Jan Pellering : Anarchisme in België van 1880 tot 1914, hele tekst.

=== In English ===
- Erik Buelinckx, Proudhon’s influence in Belgium: nationalism and culture, 2009, read online.
