= Maria Zazzi =

Italian anarchist (1904–1993)

Aunt Maria Zazzi
- Born: 10 June 1904; Coli, Emilia, Italy
- Died: 5 January 1993 (aged 88); Bologna, Emilia-Romagna, Italy
- Political party: Italian Anarchist Federation
- Movement: Anarchism, anti-fascism
- Opponent: Fascist Italy
- Partner(s): Armando Malaguti (1923–1955); Alfonso Fantazzini (1955–1985)

Maria Zazzi (1904–1993) was an Italian anarchist and anti-fascist that was involved in a series of campaigns to aid refugees and support prisoners. Following the rise of Italian fascism, she fled to France, where she became involved in the Parisian anarchist movement. She moved to Belgium, where she supported anarchist prisoners in Brussels and led the campaign in defense of Sacco and Vanzetti, but was eventually forced to leave the country due to a police investigation of her. She briefly spent time in Barcelona during the Spanish Revolution of 1936 and was arrested by the Gestapo following the Battle of France. During World War II, she finally returned to Italy and joined the Italian resistance movement, going on to become a leading figure in the post-war anarchist movement and a mentor to the anarchist bank robber Horst Fantazzini.

== Biography ==
On 10 June 1904, Maria Zazzi was born in Coli, in the northern province of Piacenza. In the wake of the March on Rome and the rise of Italian fascism, in 1923, Zazzi left Italy and moved to Paris, where she supported her recently bereaved brother and his newborn baby. In the French capital, she met and fell in love with the Italian anarchist Armando Malaguti, who introduced her to anarchist ideas and brought her into the movement. At that time, the Parisian anarchist movement was largely composed of working-class men, with Zazzi distinguishing herself as one of the movement's few women. An energetic activist, she dedicated herself to aiding fellow refugees from Italy and distributing anarchist propaganda, working closely together with the family of Camillo Berneri.

As Malaguti was frequently arrested for his anarchist activism, in 1927, he was expelled from France and the couple moved to Belgium. In Brussels, they again fell in with the local anarchists, with whom Zazzi continued her activities in refugee aid and propaganda distribution. She frequently visited the city's anarchist prisoners, always introducing herself as their aunt, leading the prison guards to nickname her "Tante Marie" (English: Aunt Maria). She also led the local campaign in defense of the Italian-American anarchists Sacco and Vanzetti, culminating with the spontaneous organisation of a general strike on the day of their execution. During this time, Zazzi also met the Belarusian anarchist Ida Mett and her husband Nicolas Lazarévitch, as well as the Spanish anarchists Buenaventura Durruti and Francisco Ascaso.

Zazzi and Malaguti then moved on to Liège, but after Malaguti got into an argument with a Catholic priest of fascist sympathies, he was officially expelled from the city. He attempted to remain there clandestinely, but after police searched their house and interrogated Zazzi about his whereabouts, they resolved to return to Brussels. Upon arrival at Brussels-Central railway station, Zazzi herself was arrested. But the police were unable to identify her, as they had gotten her surname incorrect and only had a poor-quality photograph of her. She convinced them that they were looking for someone else and was quickly released. Still under police investigation, in 1932, Zazzi and Malaguti left Belgium and returned to Paris. Back in the French capital, they reunited with the local anarchist movement and met the exiled Ukrainian anarchist Nestor Makhno and the Russian anarchist Volin. Immediately after the Spanish Civil War broke out in July 1936, Malaguti travelled to Barcelona and joined the Ascaso Column, going on to fight in the Battle of Monte Pelado. Shortly afterwards, Zazzi herself went to Barcelona, where she observed the Spanish Revolution, describing it in otherworldly terms. She soon returned to Paris, where she organised material support for people fleeing there from war in Spain. After Malaguti was granted leave from the front, he attempted to join his wife in Paris, but was swiftly arrested by French border police.

Zazzi remained in Paris throughout the Battle of France, despite attempts by French authorities to evacuate the capital, and was arrested by the Gestapo in December 1940. The Nazis interrogated her for information on her husband, but she refused to give them any information. Upon her release, she discovered that Malaguti had been arrested, but the Nazis had not yet discovered his identity and she rebuffed further attempts to elicit information from her. She eventually found the prison he was held in and managed to visit him, before he was deported to an Italian prison in Ventotene. Zazzi followed him there in 1942, managing to cross the border despite problems with the authorities. As she was prevented from visiting him, they decided to get married, aided by local anarchists who provided them with the necessary documentation. Before they could reunite, Malaguti was transferred to a concentration camp in Renicci di Anghiari, but he managed to escape on 8 September 1943. Friends in Florence acquired documents that officially declared Malaguti to have been shot, allowing them to move safely to Bologna.

In the Emilian capital, the couple provided support to the anti-fascist partisans of the Italian resistance movement. But Zazzi ended up feeling disappointed by the culture of the Italian resistance, finding herself missing the camaradery of the movements in France, Belgium and Spain. When Malaguti died a decade after the end of the war, Zazzi began a relationship with Alfonso Fantazzini, a former partisan that she had met during her exile in Western Europe. They lived together in Bologna, where Zazzi spent the final years of her life. The couple frequently hosted meetings of the local anarchist movement, for whom they were the last representatives of the old anti-fascist generation, and provided room to people that had moved to the city from Southern Italy. Even into old age, Zazzi was a regular presence at anarchist events and actions. She was also a mentor to her partner's son Horst Fantazzini, who went on to become famous as a bank robber, and was active in the campaign for the acquittal of Pietro Valpreda.

During the 1980s, she participated in the conferences of the Italian Anarchist Federation, but was forced to finally cease her activism after succumbing to paresis. She entered hospice care following the death of Alfonso Fantazzini on 14 December 1985. On 5 January 1993, Zazzi died in the Bologna hospice. Despite her lifelong atheism and against the wishes of her mourners, she was given a religious funeral.

== Bibliography ==
- Ambrosetti, Rosanna (February 1993). "Vivere da anarchica". A/Rivista Anarchica (in Italian). Vol. 23, no. 1. pp. 36–38. ISSN 0044-5592.
- Finzi, Paolo (February 1993). "Così ricordo Maria: una figura limpida". A/Rivista Anarchica (in Italian). Vol. 23, no. 1. p. 37. ISSN 0044-5592.
- Heath, Nick (14 September 2005). "Zazzi, Maria, 1904-1993". Libcom.org.
