= Ernest Tanrez =

Belgian anarchist (1898–1954)

Ernest "Ernestan" Tanrez
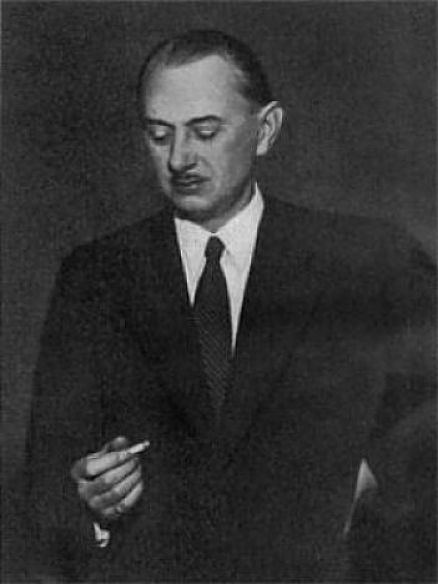
- Born: 15 July 1898; Ghent, East Flanders, Belgium
- Died: 17 February 1954; Brussels, Belgium
- Occupation(s): Anarchist theoretician Writer; Political commnetator Antiques dealer Anti-war activist

Ernest "Ernestan" Tanrez (15 July 1898 – 17 February 1954) was a theoretician of Libertarian socialism and an important figure in Belgian anarchism.

== Biography ==
"Ernestan" Tanrez was born at Ghent in East Flanders into a middle-class family. His mother was Flemish while his father was from the francophone southern half of Belgium (Wallonia). His paternal grand parents were of Franco-Spanish ancestry. Despite being a Flemish (Dutch) -speaking region, in the northern part of Belgium, including Ghent, members of the intellectual and mercantile classes frequently used French as a first language in the home during this period. When Tanrez later emerged as a writer, it would be to the anarchist periodicals in the French language that he contributed. Later, French was also the language he used for his books, generally using "Ernestan" as a pen name.

He was just 16 when war broke out in 1914: he was obliged to terminate his studies early and escape to France where he discovered the writings of the pacifist writer-philosopher (and Nobel laureate), Romain Rolland. Tanrez was conscripted into the army in 1918, but the war ended shortly after this happened, and he was able to avoid involvement in the fighting. He now made his home in Brussels, where he opened an antiques shop. A natural autodidact, he found opportunities to build for himself a solid base of cultural knowledge during this period.

Deeply affected by the horrors of the First World War, Tanrez began to frequent avant-garde circles and to participate actively in the Anarchist Movement. In June 1921, using the pen name by which he would subsequently become known, "Ernestan", he began to write for the Belgian libertarian press, starting with the "Bulletin libertaire", the principle periodical of the Brussels anarcho-libertarian community. The publication gave the address of its editorial office as the "Café du cygne", centrally located in Brussels' iconic "Grand-Place" / "Grote Markt" / "Main Square". The manager of the "Café du cygne" at this time was none other than Ernest Tanrez. He also became a regular contributor to Camille Mattart's "L’Emancipateur", a (mostly) monthly magazine which employed a sub-title to define itself as an "Organe communiste-anarchiste Révolutionnaire" ("anarcho-communist revolutionary organ"). His articles appeared frequently, both in the magazine's first series, which ran from July 1921 till December 1925, and of the second series, which was produced between May 1928 and November 1936. He also wrote for "Combat", a relatively short-lived journal produced at Flémalle and Brussels between 1925 and 1928. "Combat" was also published by Camille Mattart, in this case as a joint production with "Hem Day" (as Marcel Dieu was known to readers). As his reputation among students of anarcho-libertarianism grew through the 1920s, essays and other articles by "Ermestan" were increasingly to be found in international journals such as "Le Libertaire" published, by this time, in France, and "Le Combat syndicaliste".

Tanrez combined his abilities as a theoretician of Libertarian socialism with a talent for public speaking. For more than a quarter of a century, his many articles and insights enriched intellectual debate within and beyond the international anarchist press. High-profile causes in which he participated included sustained support for Nicola Sacco and Bartolomeo Vanzetti, two Italian anarchists who emigrated to North America and, during the 1920s, faced trial for a series of capital crimes. The criminal processes invoked by the state-level criminal justice system were widely perceived as badly flawed. Sacco and Vanzetti were executed in 1927, sentenced by a Massachusetts judge who was reported to have described them (allegedly in private) as "anarchist bastards". The fairness or otherwise of their conviction remained a live issue, still resonating fifty years later. Another issue to which he returned increasingly, as the number of political exiles escaping from Fascist Italy and other persecution hotspots increased during the 1920s and 1930s, was the need to broaden asylum rights. Having experienced the First World War, he had also become a committed anti-militarist. A couple of months before the Hitler government took power in early 1933 "Ernestan" became one of the first to join the "Hem Day" committee's anti-conscription campaign, returning the government-issued document in respect his military record ("Livret militaire"), standing up for the right to conscientious objection and, in that context, helping to intensify the public pressure that secured the early releases of Marcel Dieu (1902–1969) and Léo Campion (1905–1992) at the end of 1933. In 1937 he teamed up with Léo Campion to launch the journal "Rébellion" in support of the ill-fated Spanish Revolution. Two editions were produced in Brussels in May and August 1937, to be followed by a successor publication "L’Espagne Nouvelle", printed at intervals between 1937 and 1939 using production facilities at Nîmes made available by the fellow antifascist André Prudhommeaux.

In May 1940 a new German invasion sent Tanrez into another French exile. Later that same month someone reported him to the authorities, and he was arrested in the village of Perrier (Auvergne). He spent the next three months interned at Camp Vernet, a vast internment camp south of Toulouse. The camp had been recommissioned and expanded to accommodate returning anti-Franco Interbrigistas returning defeated from the Spanish Civil War. Living conditions were moderately grim but security was lax. However, with the northern half of France being over-run by the German army, escaping was not an appealing option for inmates. The camp had by this time become a holding location where the French authorities detained "undesirable foreigners". Fellow internees included Léo Campion and Nicolas Lazarévitch. There were also large numbers of politically like-minded comrades from Italy and Spain.

By the time Tanrez was freed from Camp Vernet, in August 1940, northern France and Belgium were both under direct German occupation and a measure of uneasy calm had resumed. He returned to Belgium. He was again denounced, more than a little implausibly as a "communist sympathizer", and early during 1941 arrested by the security services. He was interned at Fort Breendonk (along the road between Brussels and Antwerp) which the Germans had adapted for use as a camp for forced labourers. He was released eight weeks later, much weakened through a combination of forced heavy manual labour and malnutrition. Freedom on this occasion followed a joint intervention by Léo Campion and Ernestan's brother who, far from being any sort of an anarchist, was a Flemish separatist. The two of them had alerted Paul Colin (1985–1943), an influential collaborationist journalist, to his plight.

After the war ended, he became a contributor to "Pensée et Action", which reverted to the editorial control of Marcel Dieu after 1945. Tanrez was later involved in its expansion and relaunch as "Les Cahiers de Pensée et Action". He also published political pamphlets of his own.

Throughout the period covered by Ernestan's career there were close links between Freemasonry and the Anarchist movement in Belgium. Both Marcel Dieu and Léo Campion were long-standing free masons. Tanrez was initiated into the "Action et Solidarité no 2" lodge of the Grand Orient of Belgium at Brussels in 1948. Three years later he became "Frère Orateur" of his lodge.
