= Mawet =

Mawet is a surname. Notable people with the surname include:

- Chiquet Mawet (1937–2000), Belgian playwright
- Frédéric Mawet (born 1977), Belgian badminton player
