= Camille Mattart =

Belgian anarcho-communist (1886–1957)

- Born: 1886
- Died: 1957 (aged 70–71); Liège
- Era: 20th century
- Movement: Anarcho-communism

Camille Mattart (1886–1957) was a revolutionary trade unionist and militant anarcho-communist.

In 1904, he was a deputy treasurer of the Friendly Federation of Anarchists of Belgium. He collaborated with L'Insurgé and L'Action Directe, an organ of the Belgian General Confederation of Labour (CGT). On 11–12 June 1905, he participated in the revolutionary trade union congress of Charleroi, where the bases of the Belgian CGT were drawn up. In 1908, he was administrator of the newspaper L’Avant-Garde. Before World War I he collaborated with L'Émancipateur, a revolutionary anarchist communist organ published by the group Les Chercheurs de rire. In 1919, he contributed to the newspaper Le Communiste. In Flémalle he took over the editorial staff of L'Émancipateur which became Le Combat. He organized the purchase of printing equipment in 1929. He participated in the Anarchist Union and the Federation of Anarchist Groups. With J. Ledoux and Hem Day, at the end of the 1920s, he led the Belgian Group for the Right of Asylum. Mattart contributed to the Publications de la Révolte et des Temps nouvelles by Jean Grave.

Mattart died in Liège in 1957.
