= Louis Mercier-Vega =

Belgian anarchist writer (1914–1977)

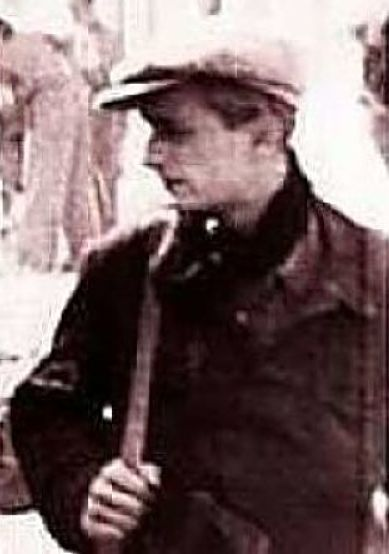
- Mercier-Vega at Siétamo during the Spanish Revolution, September 1936
- Born: Charles Cortvrint; 6 May 1914; Brussels, Belgium
- Died: 20 November 1977 (aged 63); Collioure, France
- Other names: Charles Ridel, Damaski, Santiago Parane, Courami and L'Itinerant
- Occupation: Journalist
- Era: 20th century
- Partner: Eliane Casserini

Louis Mercier-Vega (6 May 1914 – 20 November 1977) was a militant libertarian and syndicalist, originally from Belgium.

He also lived and wrote under various other names. His real name was Charles Cortvrint. Other names mentioned in sources include Charles Ridel', Damaski, Santiago Parane, Courami and L'Itinerant.

In August 1936 he joined the Sébastien Faure battalion in the Durruti Column and went to fight against the Francoists on the Aragon Front in the Spanish Civil War. He later became better known as an activist-journalist and anarchist propagandist. He published several books and contributed to the establishment of various journals and international associations.

== Life ==
=== Provenance and early years ===
Charles Cortvrint was born in Brussels. His father was French: his mother was from Chile. From the age of 16 he was actively participating in the Belgian anarchist movement. He contributed to "Réveil syndicaliste", edited by the "Syndicalist actions groups", headed up by Jean De Boë, Nicolas Lazarévitch and Ida Mett.

Unwilling to perform military service in Belgium, in around 1931 he moved to Paris where he made contact with the "Anarchist Union". In 1933 he was a delegate to the "Anarchist Union" congress held at Orléans. As a member of "Communist Anarchist Youth" ("Jeunesse anarchiste communiste" / JAC) he backed the Anarcho-communism project and actively supported the creation and organisation of the libertarian movement. In the Paris region he was involved in the wave of strikes in the early summer of 1936. He participated in the "Moules-à-Gauffre" anarchist group, together with Charles Charpentier and Robert Léger.

=== Spanish revolution and resistance ===
With the outbreak, in 1936, of the Spanish Revolution, he set off with Charles Charpentier and became a founder of the Sébastien Faure battalion, part of the International Brigades participating against the Francoists in the rapidly developing Spanish Civil War. The Faure battalion became part of the Durruti Column, fighting on the Aragon Front. Before the end of 1936, however, Mercier-Vega had returned to France where he launched a massive campaign of information and support in respect of the Spanish republic. He published his "Carnets de route" in the 11 September 1936 edition of Le Libertaire (under the pseudonym "Charles Ridel").

Following deep differences, both over organisation and the role of "factory groups" in industrial confrontations and over the importance of the Spanish Civil War, Mercier-Vega quit the Anarchist Union in November 1937.

By the end of 1939 he was being actively sought by the police. He tried, unsuccessfully, to embark from Marseille and then, supported by activist networks, made his way to Brussels where he was accommodated by Hem Day. In the end it was from Antwerp that he embarked for Argentina.

He spent time in Chile and then recrossed the Atlantic to Africa. The Second World War had broken out, from the French perspective, in September 1939, which was followed by the German invasion and occupation of northern France in May/June 1940. The Germans never conquered the French imperial territories in Africa, however, and on 26 June 1942 Mercier-Vega signed up as a volunteer with the Free France (government in exile) organisation which was commanded, mostly from London, by Charles de Gaulle.

=== Libertarian writer ===
Directly after demobilisation Mercier-Vega worked at the Grenoble-based newspaper, Le Dauphiné libéré. Between 1946 and 1950 he was a regular contributor to Le Libertaire, writing under the pseudonyms "Damashki" and "Santiago Parane".

At the start of the 1950s he joined the "Friends of Liberty" ("Amis de la liberté"), the French section of the Congress for Cultural Freedom" ("Congrès pour la liberté de la culture"), and international anti-totalitarian intellectual organisation. In 1958 he created the "International Commission of Workers' Liaison" ("Commission internationale de liaison ouvrière"), a libertarian and revolutionary syndicalist network.

During his career he worked with the libertarian press on the creation of several reviews, such as " Révision" (1938) with Marie-Louise Berneri, "Aportes" (1966–1972) and "Interrogations" (1974–1979).

He was also the author of a number of publications.

Following the death in 1973 of his partner, Eliane Casserini, Louis Mercier-Vega took his own life on 20 November 1977.
