= Socialist Unity (UK) =

- Abbreviation: SU
- Founded: 1977
- Dissolved: 1979
- Ideology: Socialism; Trotskyism
- Political position: Far-left
- Coalition members: International Marxist Group; Workers League; Big Flame; Marxist Worker

Socialist Unity was a small socialist electoral coalition in the United Kingdom. It was formed by the International Marxist Group (IMG) as a response to the Socialist Workers Party (SWP) standing candidates in elections.

Initially, in 1977, the IMG formed local groups, and then the national Socialist Unity grouping. They suggested an alliance with the SWP, which was rejected. The coalition attracted the support of the Workers League, Big Flame, the Marxist Worker group, and some independent socialists. The Workers League, Marxist Worker and the remnants of the Libertarian Communist Group were absorbed by the IMG and Big Flame around this time.

The group stood six candidates in the 1979 UK general election, including Tariq Ali. None of the candidates secured a contested seat. The coalition was dropped when the IMG decided to seek to influence the Labour Party instead.
