= Nicolas Lazarévitch =

Belgian politician (1895–1975)

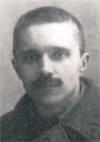
- Born: Nikolaï Ivanovitch Lazarevitch (Николай Иванович Лазаревич); 17 August 1895; Jupille, Liège, Belgium
- Died: 24 December 1975 (aged 80); Paris, France
- Occupations: libertarian-anarchist writer and activist
- Spouse: Ida (Gilman) Mett (1901–1973)
- Children: Marc Lazarévitch

Nicolas Lazarévitch (17 August 1895 – 24 December 1975) was a Belgian-born French electrician, a building worker, a proof-reader and, most consistently, a libertarian-anarchist writer and activist. He was born and grew up in Belgium, the child of Russian exiles.

== Biography ==
=== Provenance and early years ===
Nikolaï Ivanovitch Lazarevitch, the second of his parents' three sons, was born at Jupille, an industrial municipality a short distance down-river from Liège. The local economy was based on the coal mines and on the Piedboeuf Brewery. His parents had been obliged to flee from imperial Russia on account of their revolutionary activities.

=== Young anarchist ===
As a young man he worked as an electrician in various factories and mines in Wallonia, becoming an anarcho-syndicalist shortly before the outbreak of war in 1914. He later wrote in a memoire that his co-workers were united in their hatred of war, although after the German army invaded Belgium many abandoned their pacifism. By 1916 he had left Belgium, fearful of conscription, and was working as a mechanic in the mines in Germany's Ruhr region: in 1917 he was able to escape to the Netherlands which had been able to avoid direct military involvement in the war. There he linked up with Russian prisoners of war who had also managed to escape across the border from Germany, and he was able to lend his support to their attempts to be repatriated to Russia. While in the Netherlands he was arrested and detained in a camp at Bergen because, it was said, he had formed a "soviet" with Russian soldiers escaped from Germany. He was able to escape and, eventually, make his way with others to what had by now become the Russian Soviet Federative Socialist Republic (Росси́йская Сове́тская Федерати́вная Социалисти́ческая Республика), following the Russian Revolution. He arrived in Moscow in January 1919, having undertaken more than 300 km (200 miles) of the journey on foot, via Vilnius and Lithuania. Like much of Europe, Russia was in a state of social, political and periodically military turmoil as the Bolsheviks fought to secure their version of the revolution. Lazarévitch joined the Red army and was sent to the south with a mission to try and radicalise French troops and navy personnel in the area. During the spring of 1919, he fell ill with Typhus in Odessa and nearly died. He was arrested and faced execution, but was saved from that fate when the Red army recaptured Odessa from the French Army who had intervened in the Russian conflict in support of the white army (Бѣлая Армія). Lazarévitch at this stage believed that in terms of political objectives and beliefs the Bolsheviks had much in common with the anarchists, although the former were self-evidently better organised. As Denikin's anti-Bolshevik forces gained the upper hand in the Odessa area, Lazarévitch fled across the border into Romania where he was briefly arrested. He then made his way (illegally) across Yugoslavia to Italy where during the summer of 1920 he found himself in Milan shortly before the workers' occupations of several major factories. He linked up with local anarchists, notably Francesco Ghezzi and the group around Errico Malatesta, and was involved in street fights against the fascisti, who were, according to at least one source, "protected by the police". By 1921 he was back in Russia where he worked in a succession of industrial enterprises, starting in the assembly hall of the metal works of the Dynamo factory in Moscow, and then in the mines at Tula before moving on to Yalta in the south where he joined an agricultural commune installed in the large pleasant home of an escaped bourgeois family. The home was surrounded by a vast garden which the commune members set out to clear for planting. During all this time the government was implementing its New Economic Policy and Lazarévitch became acutely aware that traditional workers' remedies involving trades unionism and strikes no longer existed. He accordingly involved himself in protest actions which caught the attention of the authorities and led to his arrest in 1924. There was no trial, but sources refer to a decision that he should spend three years in a labour camp. He seems never to have been sent to a labour camp, however: his period in "pre-trial detention" was cut short thanks friends whom he had met while living on the commune at Yalta. One was the militant anti-Stalinist Boris Souvarine, a Russian political exile based in Paris, where he had excellent links to the press. Souvarine and another friend, the Russia expert Pierre Pascal, organised an "international support campaign" which eventually, in 1926, caused Lazarévitch to be expelled from the Soviet Union.

=== Activist in France ===
He settled in France later in 1926 and supported himself as a construction worker. One source indicates that he settled in the Jura department, near the Swiss border, but he was evidently in close contact with Paris-based comrades, and engaged in a large amount of travelling between 1926 and 1928. He also set about informing comrades about his five years in Russia in a published memoire entitled "Ce que j'ai vécu en Russie". From the viewpoint of the activist minority it recalled his activities in the world of Russian workers, his interventions in factories, involvement in clandestine workers' education and evening classes, propaganda actions, demands for wage increases and the contradictions implicit in the treatment afforded to visiting government dignitaries and their guests. At the Dynamo factory in Moscow he had published several political tracts for fellow workers and had them placed at the work stations overnight. He had also been involved in "improving" official notices on the factory notice boards, with messages opposing wage cuts and Taylorism, and condemning a trade agreement between the Soviet Union and England. He recalled his imprisonment: even when deprived of his liberty the dedicated trades unionist/syndicalist had celebrated the May Day workers' holiday in his cell. During his time in the Russian prison Lazarévitch had plenty of time to read and study. He subsequently recalled that he was able to learn "several languages". As the child of Russian parents growing up in the Francophone part of a bi-lingual country, he had presumably never been a monoglot. Communication of his Russian experiences was not restricted to the written word. Between 1926 and 1928 he arranged around fifty meetings in Germany, Switzerland and France in order to share his experiences more widely. Something of the character of these meetings is apparent from the observation reproduced in one source that they often involved clashes with "local communists".

=== Ida Mett ===
Ida Gilman (usually identified in sources as Ida Mett) was born in Smarhon’, a small industrial predominantly Jewish town in the flatlands between Vilnius and Minsk: at the time of her birth the entire region was part of the Russian empire. She studied medicine in Moscow, but in 1924, shortly before she was about to receive her degree, she was placed under arrest for her "anti-Soviet activities". She managed to escape and moved to join her parents who by this time were living in Poland. In 1925 or (more likely) 1926 she arrived in Paris and joined up with other left-wing politically aware Russian exiles, becoming a prominent member of the emerging Paris anarchist "platformist" organisation. It was probably in 1926 in Paris that she met up with Nicolas Lazarévitch. Some sources imply that they subsequently married. Shortly after teaming up with Lazarévitch she was expelled from the hardline anarchist group with which she had become involved in Paris on account of her "religious practices": she lit a candle to celebrate her father on the day of his death. Her own left-wing political commitment and activism remained undiminished, however.

Ida continued to contribute to Le Libertaire, an anarchist journal which enabled her to taking a leading role in denouncing the dire situation facing the workers in the Soviet Union. She also joined Lazarévitch at his political meetings in France, Germany and Switzerland at which the two of them delivered the same message. On account of their continuing campaigning the French authorities expelled them towards the end of November 1928 and they moved to francophone Belgium where between 1928 and 1930 Lazarévitch worked as a miner in the Liège area.

=== Belgium, Spain and Belgium ===
In 1931 they crossed back (illegally and briefly) into France where they made the acquaintance of Simone Weil, with whom Lazarévitch would remain in contact for the rest of his life. In June 1931 Lazarévitch set off for Spain where he was to attend an International Workers' Association conference in Madrid. It appears that, traveling separately, Ida Mett had already arrived in Spain where, with the help of Francisco Ascaso and Buenaventura Durruti, the two of them succeeded in organising a number of public meetings. He also contributed reports from Spain that appeared in "La Révolution prolétarienne", a Paris-based syndicalist magazine, and another publication using the (frequently revived) title, "Le Cri du Peuple". Lazarévitch and Mett moved back to France, and then to Belgium, probably by the end of 1931. Lazarévitch nevertheless continued to keep in touch with the politically precarious situation in Spain and to provide commentaries on it for readers of "La Révolution prolétarienne" from his home in Belgium. But he never himself went back to Spain. In 1931, probably in Belgium, the couple's son, Marc was born. They remained in Belgium till 1936, a period during which Lazarévitch moved in libertarian circles and was involved with pacifist groups in the country. In 1932 he joined with Jean De Boë to found the syndicalist action groups which produced the fortnightly "Le Réveil syndicaliste" at Jupille, of which thirty editions were published between November 1932 and April 1934. In 1933 he was arrested and sentenced to four months imprisonment by a court at Verviers, for having harangued striking textile workers at a banned rally. He was arrested again, together with Ida, in 1934, and sentenced to a further fifteen days in prison.

=== Return to France ===
In 1935, as another major European war loomed on the horizon, he established the constitution for a "Committee against War" and attended a conference on the subject at the "Conférence of Saint-Denis" on 10/11 August. In June 1936 he was arrested again and condemned to spend seven months in prison, but was released soon afterwards following an intervention by the Brussels syndicates (loosely, trades unions). During 1936 he returned clandestinely to France and settled at Le Pré-Saint-Gervais, a northern suburb of Paris. He found work as a proof reader and was admitted to the proof-readers' union. In April 1937 Lazarévitch and Félix Guyard founded a fortnightly political magazine based along the lines of the former "Réveil syndicalist" that he had produced in Brussels till the previous year. The name that appeared most frequently on the foot of articles was that of L. Nuiteux, which was one of Lazarévitch's own most frequently employed pseudonyms. Meanwhile, Lazarévitch and Mett – who was Jewish – applied for citizenship. The application was turned down. They did, however, manage to obtain the first of a succession of a time-limited residence permits ("permis de séjour"), which according to at least one source were "supplied to them illegally". It is not clear that their repeated applications for French citizenship were ever successful, but their "administrative situation" was later regularised through the intervention of their friend Boris Souvarine.

=== Arrest and detention ===
War returned in September 1939 when the French and British governments declared war on Germany in response to the German invasion of Poland. Germany and the Soviet Union were at this stage bound by a mutual non-aggression pact, and two weeks after the German invasion from the west, Poland was subjected to a Soviet invasion from the south and east. Despite the French declaration of war, on the streets of Paris eerily little changed for slightly more than eight months. On 10 May 1940 Germany invaded France, taking just six weeks to over-run the country. It was almost certainly only in June 1940 that Nicolas Lazarévitch and Ida Mett were both arrested: sources differ as to why. Either Lazarévitch was arrested because he refused to join the army or else they were both arrested – like several thousand other foreign refugees seeking safety from race-based and / or political persecution in Paris – because they were foreign, and therefore identified as enemy aliens. They were arrested by the French police on 8 June 1940. Ida and the couple's eight-year-old son Marc were interned together at the Rieucros Camp in the hills south of Clermont-Ferrand till April 1941. Lazarévitch was sent to Camp Vernet, set in the Pyrenean foothills to the south of Toulouse. Both camps were located in remote locations in the so-called free zone which following the signing of the armistice on 22 June 1940 were administered not through direct military occupation but by a puppet government under the leadership of the (hitherto) widely admired war hero Marshal Pétain. Both camps had been used, since February 1939, to accommodate former internationalist fighters returning, defeated, from the Spanish Civil War, and now regarded by the increasingly nervous French authorities as a security threat. Internment in Camp Vernet turned out to be something of an "anarchists reunion": others at Le Vernet camp included Léo Campion and Ernest "Ernestan" Tanrez. Lazarévitch was apparently carrying a Belgian passport, and was fairly soon was placed on a train to take him across France to Belgium.

=== Escape ===
He escaped from the transport train and spent the next couple of years living "underground" (unregistered), supporting himself through farm work in Les Landes. During 1941 he was reunited with his wife and son. There are references to the three of them having been among the thousands of refugees in Marseille during that year. Marseille was a focus for political and / or race based refugees from Nazi persecution, trying to arrange French exit visas and entry visas for Portugal, Mexico or the United States. There are no suggestions in the sources that Lazarévitch and Ida were attempting to leave France, however. They were assigned a residence permit at La Garde-Freinet (along the coast to the east of Marseille) in 1942 and then at nearby Draguignan in 1943. (Both these little towns were in a part of the (ever-less) "free" zone which during 1942 came under Italian military occupation in response to the shifting fortunes of war.)

=== Postwar ===
After the war Lazarévitch returned to Paris and went back to his former profession as a proof-reader, also rejoining the proof-readers' trades union ("Syndicat des correcteurs"). He also met up with the writer Albert Camus whom he helped with work on documentation of nineteenth century Russian terrorists (which preceded the 1949 five-act drama, "Les Justes"). Alongside that Lazarévitch launched a new and sustained campaign to educate people about Russia and to publicise what he saw as the truth about the Soviet Union. At a time when the prestige of the Soviet Union in leftwing political circles and with the public more generally in the west, Lazarévitch was keen to persuade everyone – but especially the workers and trades unionists – of the lies about conditions back home ("le plus terrible des mensonges, celui de la réalisation du "socialisme" en URSS ...") of the Soviet propaganda. During the three decades from 1945 till his death Lazarévitch continued the struggle to make his views known, contributing to political publications and organising conferences, but mostly within a relatively restricted circle of friends, work-comrades, political soul-mates, Russian political exiles and, especially after 1960, students whom he came across when he returned to study on his own account.

He teamed up with Lucien Feuillade to publish a selection of anti-Soviet texts in a volume entitled, "Tu peux tuer cet homme, scènes de la vie révolutionnaire russe" ("You can kill this man: scenes from revolutionary Russian life") which comprised a series of factual testimonies exposing the contradictions of the Soviet Union's revolutionary journey and its ultimate failure. During the early months of 1949 he also joined up with some of the more eminent members of the Paris leftwing intellectual establishment, including Albert Camus, Louis Mercier and Roger Lapeyre to establish the "Groupes de liaison internationale" ("International liaison groups", GLI). At the end of 1950 he was still displaying a certain frustration over their dissolution. Between 1950 and 1958, in the context of intensifying Cold War tensions between the two side of the "Iron Curtain" across Europe, he was instrumental in creating and producing "La Réalité russe", described as a bimonthly "information bulletin" which reproduced, with its own commentaries, articles translated from the official Soviet press. The objective was to make aspects of the social, economic and cultural realities in the Soviet Union accessible to French public opinion. Later he worked between 1957 and 1965 with Louis Mercier on the regular publications of the "International Commission of Workers' Liaison" ("Commission internationale de liaison ouvrière"), his contributions appearing under the pseudonym "Petrov".

== Publications (selection) ==
- Ce que j'ai vécu en Russie, with a preface by Jean Ledoux, Liège, Éditions Syndicat fédéraliste des mécaniciens et assimilés, 1926.
- Tu peux tuer cet homme : scènes de la vie révolutionnaire russe, with Lucien Feuillade, Paris, Collection Espoir, Éditions Gallimard, 1950.
- L'école soviétique : enseignements primaire et secondaire, with Ida Mett, preface by Pierre Pascal, Éditions Les îles d'or, Paris, 1954.
- À travers les révolutions espagnoles, Paris, Éditions P. Belfond, 1972.
- Autobiographie suivie du roman Les amours des abeilles travailleuses, with Alexandra Kollontai and Christine Fauré, Éditions Berg-Bélibaste, 1976.
