= Big Flame (political group) =

British revolutionary socialist feminist organisation

- Abbreviation: BF
- Founded: 1970
- Dissolved: 1984
- Merged into: Labour Party
- Headquarters: Liverpool
- Newspaper: Revolutionary Socialism
- Ideology: Revolutionary socialism Libertarian Marxism; Socialist feminism
- Political position: Far-left
- National affiliation: Socialist Unity (1978)

Website
- https://bigflameuk.wordpress.com/

Big Flame was "a revolutionary socialist feminist organisation with a working-class orientation" in the United Kingdom. Founded in Liverpool in 1970, the group initially grew rapidly, with branches appearing in some other cities. Its publications emphasised that "a revolutionary party is necessary but Big Flame is not that party, nor is it the embryo of that party". The group was influenced by the Italian Lotta Continua group.

The group published a magazine, Big Flame, and a journal, Revolutionary Socialism. Members were active at the Ford plants at Halewood and Dagenham and devoted a great deal of time to self-analysis and considering their relationship with the larger Trotskyist groups. In time, they came to describe their politics as "libertarian Marxist". In 1976 an undercover officer of the Special Demonstration Squad unsuccessfully attempted to infiltrate the group. In 1978 they joined the Socialist Unity electoral coalition, led by the Trotskyist International Marxist Group.

In 1980, the anarchists of the Libertarian Communist Group joined Big Flame. The Revolutionary Marxist Current also joined at about this time. However, as more members of the group defected to the Labour Party, the journal ceased publication in 1982, and the group was wound up in about 1984.

Ex-members of the group were involved in the launch of the mass-market tabloid newspaper the News on Sunday in 1987, which folded the same year.

The name of the group was taken from a television play, The Big Flame (1969), written by Jim Allen and directed by Ken Loach for the BBC's Wednesday Play season. It dealt with a fictional strike and work-in at the Liverpool Docks.
