= Marcel Dieu =

Belgian book dealer, essayist and libertarian socialist

Marcel Dieu Hem Day
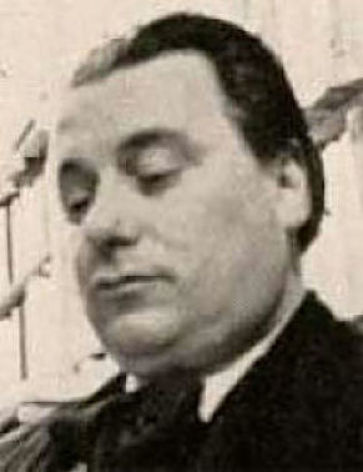
- Born: 30 May 1902; Houdeng-Goegnies (La Louvière), Hainaut (Wallonia), Belgium
- Died: 14 August 1969 (aged 67); Evere (Brussels), Belgium
- Occupations: Book dealer Essayist-commentator; Editor-publisher-compiler; Militant antimilitarist Libertarian socialist

Marcel Dieu (30 May 1902 – 14 August 1969) was a Belgian book dealer, essayist, editor-publisher-compiler, antimilitarist, activist, and libertarian socialist.

In 1933, together with Léo Campion, and in response to government moves to clamp down on pacifist activism and antimilitarism, Marcel Dieu became one of the first to return his "livret militaire", an identity document which in Belgium at this time included a summary record of an individual's military service.

His "editorial" output was very considerable, and included a range of pamphlets and leaflets, biographies of libertarian activists, numerous comment pieces and other articles published in the international libertarian press, along with involvement in conferences, participation in meetings dealing with anti-war themes and such topics as asylum rights.

Marcel Dieu is frequently identified in sources as Hem Day, the pseudonym under which he wrote, and by which he chose to identify himself while still a teenager during the First World War. For readers with the French of northern France and southern Belgium as their mother tongue, "Hem Day" corresponds approximately to the phonetic spelling of his initials, "M.D.", while avoiding distracting (for an atheist such as Marcel Dieu) associations with God. "Dieu", in addition to being the family name of Marcel Dieu, is the French word for "God".

== Biography ==
Marcel Camille Dieu was born at Houdeng-Goegnies, a small town in francophone Wallonia, located within the industrial mining region known, at the time as the "pays noir" ("black country"), a short distance to the south of Brussels. His father was a successful butcher in the town. Marcel's parents adored him and he reciprocated their affection. Nevertheless, his contrarian streak was evident at an early stage. He was still a young teenager when he declared himself a vegetarian. Later friends and admirers such as the lawyer Paul-Henri Spaak saw a connection between this decision and his father's profession as a butcher. A couple of months after his twelfth birthday World War I broke out. Less than a week later German armies from the east invaded Belgium. The German occupation of Belgium was characterised by a succession of atrocities against the civilian population which were often well publicised. The occupation lasted slightly more than four years, and when it ended Marcel Dieu had become a convinced atheist with a life-long commitment to fighting against the bestiality and atrocity of war.

Dieu's passionate hatred for war quickly expanded into involvement in a more broadly-based political anarchism and activism. During the early 1920s he played an active role in the post-war reconstruction of the Libertarian Movement, participating on 7 January 1923 at the first congress of the Belgian Anarchist Union, at which the Flemish and Wallon anarchist federations came together. By this time he had already embarked on a career as a political journalist with contributions during 1922 to "L'Émancipateur" and, in 1925, to its successor journal, "Le Combat" (of which he would later become editorial director).

In December 1925 that month's Anarchist Congress appointed him to serve as Secretary-Treasurer for the Belgian federation. It was also at the 1925 congress that Dieu persuaded delegates to adopt an antimilitarist resolution, a paralysing general strike in the event of any attempt by government to organise a military mobilisation. He was also intensely involved through his pen, during the mid-1920s, in the international campaign to save Nicola Sacco and Bartolomeo Vanzetti, two immigrant anarchists who were convicted of murder and executed in the state of Massachusetts in 1927 following a trial process widely seen as flawed on many levels.

1927 saw the inauguration at Brussels of the "Comité International de Défense Anarchiste". The organisation was mandated to come to the assistance of comrades who found themselves becoming victims of "social vindictiveness". Hem Day was nominated to serve as its secretary, a responsibility which he retained till 1939. Meanwhile he had established a second hand bookshop on Brussels, "Aux joies de l'esprit", specialising in anarchism but, as the name above the front window implied, "open to all the delights of mind and body". The proprietor made his home in another part of the building. As social tensions and political polarisation intensified across western and central Europe during the later 1920s and the 1930s, the premises it occupied became a place of refuge for political exiles of many nationalities. Francisco Ascaso, Buenaventura Durruti and Gregorio Jover all became semi-permanent presences at the shop during 1930/1931, before the proclamation of the Spanish Republic gave reason to hope that it might be safe to return home to Spain. By the end of the decade it was Louis Mercier-Vega, actively sought by police in France at the time, who found a quiet refuge with Hem Day in Brussels, until he was able to find a ship sailing to Argentina from the great Port of Antwerp.

Between November 1927 and June 1928 he published five editions of the short-lived monthly "anti-dogmatic anti-authoritarian" journal "Rebel". He then was initiated into freemasonry, according to at least one source, in 1932 joining the Belgian "Vérité du Droit Humain" lodge.

Hem Day's opposition to all forms of warfare presented him with a stark dilemma when the Spanish Civil War broke out in 1936. During 1937 he set of for Spain in order to take part in what was still being characterised as the left-wing "social revolution". In Barcelona he joined in some radio discussions and, away from the improvised CNT and DAI broadcasting studios, he visited the frontline. He had arrived as the fighting was intensifying and, as he saw matters, degenerating into a genuine international war thanks to the intervention of increasing numbers of foreign forces. He was appalled by the ghastly consequences unfolding, and found his own preferences for nonviolence powerfully confirmed. Later during 1937, having returned home, he participated in a conference opposing militarism, and addressed fellow delegates: "To embark on a revolution ... employing extreme violence, appears today as an absurd obscenity. Just the same as a war. The interdependence of nations ... along with the monstrous effectiveness of the tools of destruction, renders recourse to extreme collective violence catastrophic. ... So it appear necessary that we should not merely condemn it, but also highlight the excessive risks and the folly. We need to come up with an alternative method in the fight to put an end to capitalism or to put an end to fascism".

Later that year, on 15 May 1937, in response to an invitation from the "Cercle d'Études Populaires" ("Circle of People's Studies") in Nimes (Southern France) he chaired and led a conference under the eye-catching title "Le Fascisme contre l'intelligence: Franco contra Goya" ("Fascism versus Intelligence: Franco versus Goya"). The French authorities expelled him from the country. During the years of war and German occupation between 1940 and 1945, Hem Day adhered to his pacifist convictions. He was powerfully influenced during this period by the pacifist philosophy of Han Ryner. He remained close, in terms both of friendship and of political conviction, to Émile Armand and, till 1942, to Sébastien Faure.

In 1945 he joined the "Internationale des résistant(e)s à la guerre" / "War Resisters' International".

=== Conscientious Objection ===
Hem Day became involved in a celebrated and protracted case over his antimilitarist convictions in 1933, after Albert Devèze, the Minister of Defence (and a fellow freemason), proposed a law that would outlaw all "pacifist propaganda" and all "dissemination of antimilitarist ideas". Without hesitation, both Hem Day and his fellow antimilitarist Léo Campion returned their "livrets militaires". These were identity documents which included a summary record of an individual's military service. They accompanied their "livrets militaires" with a joint letter, explaining their position: the letter was then published. They pointed out that war was a crime against humanity. They pointed out that by signing the 1928 "Kellogg–Briand Pact" the Belgian government had recognised this fact. There was more along the same lines. Through this simple written act of protest, and the subsequent events triggered by it, the two men would become widely celebrated as "Belgium's first conscientious objectors".

The reaction was not long in coming. Both men were recalled to military service, by way of a "disciplinary measure". They must re-join their units - presumably the units in which they had served when undertaking their military service. They refused to do this, and were arrested a few days later. Hem Day was arrested in the street. He and Campion appeared before the government's so-called "War Council of Brabant" (military tribunal) on 19 July 1933: they faced what seems to have been some form of quasi-judicial process. They were very far from being the first to refuse to perform military service. Many Flemish nationalists had done so during, and then in the aftermath, of the First World War. But the case of Hem Day and Léo Campion attracted significantly greater attention, both on account of the public profiles of the defendants and (which may very well have been connected to the publicity already surrounding the matter) on account of the severity of the sentences conferred. Numerous well-known, erudite and eloquent supporters came along to the hearing to testify on behalf of the two men, including the activist philosopher Han Ryner and the formidable antifascist feminist Isabelle Blume. Memorably, the witnesses refused to swear the traditional oath. But the president of the court was insistent on the matter, and eventually they were each persuaded to do so: "I swear to tell the truth, the whole truth, so help me God." However, as each pronounced the form of words required, they turned towards the defendant, Hem Day (Marcel Dieu), making it clear that they were swearing in the name of the defendant ("Dieu" is the French word for "God") and not in the name of the ethereal being normally envisaged under these circumstances.

Hem Day declared from the outset, and made clear throughout with his demeanour, "I am here, not as the accused but as the accuser!" No one expected a quasi-judicial conviction. Some form of oratorical jousting was anticipated. The two defendants had both performed their military service in the usual way, respectively in 1922 and 1925: their service records were excellent. The worst reproach that could be thrown at them was that they had refused to respond to a recall to arms, imposed not on account of some national military necessity, but as a punitive sanction. Taking their turn to address members of the ad hoc court, Hem Day and Campion had no difficulty in transforming themselves into exceptionally well briefed accusers, ridiculing the judicial and military authorities.

In retrospect the socialist lawyer Paul-Henri Spaak (1899-1972), was probably the most eminent of all those who appeared before the hearing, on account of his subsequent political career and four years, between 1957 and 1961, as Secretary General of NATO. He fulfilled the role of defence attorney for Hem Day and his co-accused: "War, these days, is about colonies, oil, the prestige of one government or another. War today is the outcome of all the imperialism [of the preceding centuries]". He went on to interrogate persuasively the tribunal's underlying understanding of patriotism, inviting them to question how that same patriotism might appear to the millions who had lost their jobs and even their homes in the Great Depression after the Wall Street crash.

The verdict of the "War Council" went against the defendants and the sentences imposed were exceptionally harsh, presumably reflecting the publicity generated and the corresponding requirement to impose an exemplary penalty. Hem Day was sentenced to a two years prison sentence: Léo Campion to eighteen months. From the point of view of the authorities the affair risked becoming a self-perpetuating vicious circle. It was apparent that having served their penalties the condemned men would be recalled to the army, would resolutely refuse, and then be recalled to another court martial hearing and resentenced. Following the sentencing, public protests against the process surged to new heights. The sentences were reduced on appeal. However, Hem Day and Campion were convinced of the justice of their own positions and refused to submit voluntarily to any sort of penalty. They were joined in this by a third objector, Lionel de Vlaminck, who had been imprisoned at the same location. The three men now embarked on a hunger strike.

Among the public, the hunger strike triggered a concern that comedy might be about to transform into tragedy, and there was a growing demand for the victims at the heart of the process to be immediately released. The lawyers for the accused men, Messrs. Spaak and Deublet, returned their own "livrets militaires" and let it be known that they had done so. Others followed suit. Increasingly, these included war veterans. Public pressure reached a level at which the government felt threatened. The authorities did not know how to resolve the matter. In the end they concocted a transparently preposterous formulation intended to preserve their self-respect: Campion and Hem Day were dismissed from the army because they were deemed unworthy to belong to it for any longer. They were excluded from the army on account of having been condemned for not wishing to re-join it or remain a part of it. The affair ended with the release of three high-profile conscientious objectors and the abandonment by the minister of his controversial proposal.

== Editorial focus ==
The encounters with the military tribunal in 1933 gained lasting recognition across francophone Europe for Hem Day as a principled and eloquent antimilitarist. During his final decades he focused on editorial work. His pacifist convictions were never far from the surface. Between 1932 and 1939 he ran the political review magazine "Pensée et Action", a publication which was, according to one admirer, not so much a magazine as "a long-running editorial project, to which he was the principle contributor, most notably in the form of 'bibliobiographies' about libertarian writers and thinkers. These became his trademark till 1968, when he revisited in some depth the trial that thirty-five years earlier had made him famous". Publication was suspended in 1939/40, but "Pensée ..." reappeared in 1945.

Right up to his death in 1969, Hem Day published dozens of books and essays, generally under the imprimatur of "Éditions Pensée et action" (Paris-Brussels). As he himself insisted, "You can never say it enough: anarchism is order without government, it is peace without violence. It is the precise opposite of everything that, whether through ignorance or simple bad faith, it is accused of being".

== Output (selection) ==
- Aperçu de la question religieuse en Espagne, Action rationaliste belge, 1932.
- Bakounine et sa Confession, suivi de La légende de la dictature chez Bakounine, La Brochure mensuelle, No. 155-156, 1935.
- Érasme, F. Piton, Bibliothèque de l'artistocratie, No. 67, 1936.
- Le Fascisme contre l'intelligence : Franco contra Goya (conférence 15 mai 1937), Éditions du Cercle d'Études Populaires (Nimes), 1937.
- Alerte, voici les gaz !, Éditions Pensée et action, 1938.
- Étienne de La Boétie, R. Debresse, Bibliothèque de l'artistocratie, No. 103, 1939.
- Souvenirs sur Han Ryner, Les Amis de l'artistocratie, Bibliothèque de l'artistocratie, No. 123, 1946.
- Non-violence et action directe, Éditions Pensée et action, 1948.
- L'objection de conscience et la loi en Belgique, Section belge de l'internationale des résistant(e)s à la guerre, 1949
- Ernestan (1898-1954) : sa vie, son œuvre, Éditions Pensée et action, 1955.
- Ernestan : essai de bibliographie, Éditions Pensée et action, 1955.
- Ernestan (1898-1954) : sa vie, son œuvre, Éditions Pensée et action, 1955.
- Avec André Prudhommeaux, Ernestan (1898-1954) et le socialisme libertaire, Paris-Bruxelles, Pensée et Action, 1955.
- Deux Frères de bonne volonté Élisée Reclus et Han Ryner, Éditions les Amis de Han Ryner et Pensée et action, 1956.
- Élisée Reclus en Belgique : sa vie, son activité, Éditions Pensée et action, 1956.
- Un en-dehors, Manuel Devaldès, 1875-1956, Paris-Bruxelles, Pensée et Action, 1957, notice.
- Bible de l'objecteur de conscience et de raison, Éditions Pensée et action, 1957.
- Louise Michel, Jules Verne, de qui est "Vingt mille lieues sous les mers" ? suivi de Louise Michel, poète, Éditions Pensée et action, 1959.
- Bibliographie de Louise Michel : 1830-1905, Éditions Pensée et action, 1959.
- Francisco Ferrer : un précurseur, Éditions Pensée et action, 1959.
- Essai de bibliographie sur l'œuvre de Francisco Ferrer, Éditions Pensée et action, 1960.
- Gérard de Lacaze-Duthiers : l'artistocratie en action, Éditions Pensée et action, 1960.
- Gérard de Lacaze-Duthiers : le pacifiste, Éditions Pensée et action, 1960.
- Ferdinand Domela Nieuwenhuis : vie et pensée, Éditions Pensée et action, 1960.
- Essai de bibliographie sur l'œuvre de Sébastien Faure, Éditions Pensée et action, 1961.
- Essai de bibliographie sur l'œuvre de Gérard de Lacaze Duthiers, Éditions Pensée et action, 1960.
- Individualisme d'harmonie chez Han Ryner, Paul Avrich Collection (Library of Congress), Éditions Pensée & action, 1963.
- E. Armand, Sa vie, sa pensée, son Œuvre, Paris-Bruxelles, Éditions Pensée et action, 1964.
- Bibliographie de Hem Day, Éditions Pensée et action, 1964.
- Bibliographie de Michel Bakounine, Éditions Pensée et action, 1966.
- Autour d'un procès avec Léo Campion, Éditions Pensée et action, 1968.
- Zo d’Axa, mousquetaire; patricien de l’an-archie, Éditions Pensée et action, 1968.
- Essai d'une bibliographie littéraire consacrée à la mine et aux mineurs, Lallaing, Impr. du "Musée du soir", sans date.
- Histoire du chant de L'Internationale, Le Combat syndicaliste, 1970.
