= Anarchist Workers Association =

British political organisation

- Abbreviation: AWA
- Leader: Collective leadership
- Founded: 1975
- Dissolved: 1984
- Split from: Anarchist Federation of Britain
- Merged into: Big Flame
- Succeeded by: Libertarian Communist Discussion Group
- Newspaper: Libertarian Struggle
- Ideology: Platformism
- Political position: Far-left

The Anarchist Workers Association (AWA) was one of a number of class-struggle anarchist organisations that existed prior to the resurgence of anarchism in the United Kingdom during the miners' strike of 1984.

== History ==
The Organisation of Revolutionary Anarchists (ORA) was first established as a faction within the reconstituted Anarchist Federation of Britain (AFB), which had formed in reaction to the AFB's "powerlessness and lack of formal structure". The ORA grouped itself around the newspaper Libertarian Struggle, which circulated about 1,500-2,000 copies, making it larger than most other anarchist periodicals at the time.

The grouping accepted trade union activity, while also remaining critical of "union bureaucrats". In 1975, the ORA split off from the AFB and reconstituted itself as the Anarchist Workers Association (AWA), in order to emphasise its workerist orientation. It declared itself in favour of class conflict and advocated for a violent social revolution to overthrow capitalism.

With the emergence of the punk subculture, there came a renewed interest in anarchism, but this caught the AWA at a time when it was in disarray. In 1977, the AWA experienced a split, with its remnants forming the Libertarian Communist Group (LCG). Its new name represented the group's break with anarchism, as it considered the British anarchist movement of the time to be "unable to intervene actively in the struggles of the working class".

During the 1979 United Kingdom general election, the LCG participated in Socialist Unity, a Trotskyist electoral alliance that failed to achieve any meaningful results in the polls, leading the LCG to merge with libertarian Marxists of Big Flame. In response to the rise of Thatcherism, the Labour Party entered a period of relatively more left-wing politics, with a number of Trotskyist groups joining the party. Although the LCG had theoretically opposed Trotskyism, their close collaboration with Trotskyist organisations influenced many of the LCG's former members to themselves join the Labour Party, adopting the Trotskyist tactic of entryism.

In 1984, a number of former members of the LCG established the Libertarian Communist Discussion Group (LCDG), which formed the nucleus for an organisation that eventually grew into the Anarchist Federation.

== Bibliography ==
- Cross, Rich (2014). "British anarchism in the era of Thatcherism". In Smith, Evan; Worley, Matthew (eds.). Against the Grain: The British far left from 1956. Manchester: Manchester University Press. ISBN 9780719095900. OCLC 941255608.
- Franks, Benjamin (2006). Rebel Alliances: The Means and Ends of Contemporary British Anarchisms. Edinburgh: AK Press. ISBN 1904859402. OCLC 607401812.
