= General Confederation of Labour (Belgium) =

Belgian trade union

- Confédération Générale du Travail
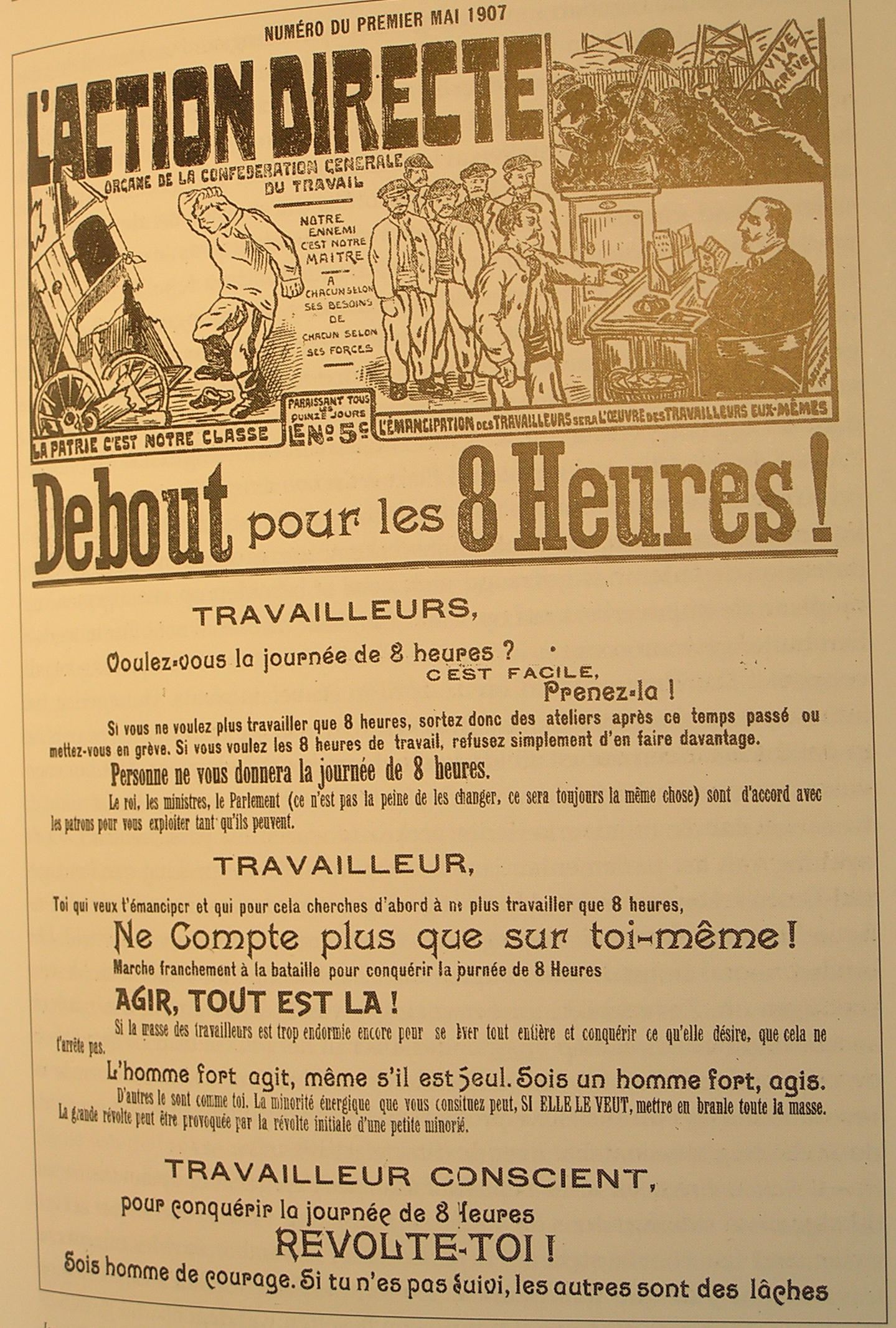
- Cover page of the CGT's newspaper from May Day, 1907
- Abbreviation: CGT
- Successor: CSB
- Formation: 28 January 1906; 120 years ago
- Founded at: Brussels
- Dissolved: 19 April 1908; 118 years ago
- Type: Trade union federation
- Official language: Walloon
- Secretary General: Léopold Preumont
- Key people: Émile Chapelier; Henri Fuss-Amoré; Georges Thonar
- Publication: L'Action Directe

The General Confederation of Labour (Walloon: Confédération Générale du Travail, CGT) was an anarcho-syndicalist trade union federation founded in Belgium in 1906.

== Background ==
The failure of the general strike of 1902 went some way to galvanising Belgian anarchists in vindication of their analysis of the limits of parliamentary democracy and reformist socialism. In the months after the general strike, the first in a series of congresses was organised in Liège by the anarchist movement. Following the conference there was a concerted effort to move away from individualism and embrace a more prefigurative approach. A prominent anarchist, Georges Thonar, penned a tract titled Ce que veulent les anarchistes (transl. What the anarchists want) calling for the creation of propaganda networks. His approach was adopted by a conference held in Charleroi in October 1904. From this conference in Charleroi several initiatives were set up including federations, a commune, and newspapers. Yet, most of these projects proved short-lived and by 1908 had ceased to function. However, a group that had formed around the anarchist Henri Fuss-Amoré's L'Action directe newspaper proposed the creation of a general confederation of labour through which to organise the movement in Belgium.

== History ==
As a result of the convergence around L'Action directe, the CGT was founded at a conference held in Brussels on 28 January 1906, with Emile Chapelier, Fuss-Amoré and Thonar in attendance, and the trade union organiser Léopold Preumont elected as Secretary General.

In 1907 a debate arose within the CGT over a tactical alliance with other independent trade unions, such as the General Diamond Workers' Association of Belgium, to form a counter-bloc to the influence of the socialist Belgian Labour Party (BWP-POB).

The CGT sought to foster links beyond Belgium, and throughout its existence, Fuss-Amoré maintained regular correspondence with Pierre Monatte of the French CGT. As a representative of the Union the former was also one of the organisers of the International Anarchist Congress of Amsterdam, which took place in 1907, at which he supported a syndicalist line.

The internal discussion to unite with other independent trade unions led to the CGT being absorbed into a new organisation named the Confédération Syndicale Belge (CSB) in April 1908. Ultimately, this effort would prove unsuccessful in challenging the dominance of the BWP-POB.
