= Ida Mett =

Belarusian anarchist and writer (1901–1973)

- אידא מאַט
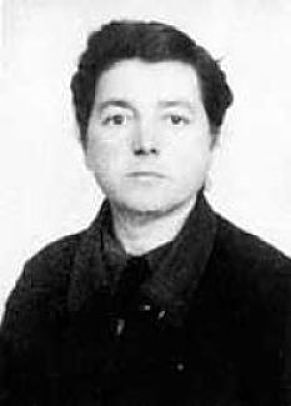
- Born: Ida Markovna Gilman; 20 July [O.S. 7 July] 1901; Smarhon, Hrodna, Russian Empire
- Died: 27 June 1973 (aged 71); Paris, France
- Other name: Ida Lazarévitch
- Occupations: Physician; writer
- Years active: 1924–1968
- Known for: Platformism
- Movement: Anarcho-syndicalism
- Spouse: Nicolas Lazarévitch
- Children: 1

Ida Mett (1901–1973) was a Belarusian anarcho-syndicalist, physician and writer. Following her experiences in the Russian Revolution, she fled into exile in France, where she collaborated with other exiled revolutionary anarchists on the Delo truda magazine and the constitution of platformism. She then went on to participate in the anarcho-syndicalist movements in Belgium, Spain and France, before repression by the fascist Vichy regime forced her to cease her activities. She spent the final decades of her life working as a nurse and publishing history books.

== Biography ==
=== Early life ===
On 20 July [O.S. 7 July] 1901, Ida Markovna Gilman was born into a family of cloth merchants, in the predominantly Jewish town of Smarhon, where she was exposed to radical ideas from a young age. In the wake of the Russian Revolution, she moved to the Russian capital of Moscow to study medicine and became an active participant in the Russian anarchist movement. In 1924, she was arrested on charges of anti-Soviet agitation and deported from Russia.

=== Delo truda ===
She fled first to Poland and then to Paris, where she took the pen-name "Ida Mett" and co-edited the Russian anarchist magazine Delo truda. Through the magazine, she began to closely collaborate with the Ukrainian anarchists Peter Arshinov and Nestor Makhno, with whom she penned the Organisational Platform of the General Union of Anarchists, the founding document of the anarchist tendency known as platformism. Mett reported on the meetings in which The Platform was discussed, noting the objections of French and Chinese anarchists. Mett herself defended the provisions in The Platform for the "ideological direction of the masses", arguing it to be necessary for anarchists to make their ideas predominate within the workers' movement and distinguishing the tactic from party political aspirations to take state power. She was quickly struck by Makhno's oratory talents at these meetings, and for three years, she helped edit his memoirs, but would end up falling out with him over the process. In 1928, she was expelled from Delo truda for her Jewish religious practices, after she lit a yahrzeit candle for her recently deceased father.

=== Clandestinity ===
During this time, she had met the Belgian libertarian Nicolas Lazarévitch, who became her husband. Together they organised a series of anti-Bolshevik campaigns, for which they were eventually expelled from France and moved to Belgium. It was at this time that she met Buenaventura Durruti and Francisco Ascaso, who invited her to Catalonia following the proclamation of the Spanish Republic. Her son Marc was born that same year.

Mett and her husband then returned clandestinely to France, where she worked as the secretary of a gas workers' union. She also worked as a correspondent for the International Institute of Social History and returned to writing for the syndicalist newspaper La Revolutión Proletarianne, although she eventually broke with the latter after it published an antisemitic article.

Following the Battle of France in 1940, the French State interned Mett and her young son in the Rieucros Camp, where they were detained for a year, until their release was secured by the French Trotskyist Boris Souvarine. They were subsequently reunited with Lazarevitch and moved to La Garde-Freinet, near the southern coast of France. After the end of World War II, Mett returned to work as a translator and also worked as a nurse at a Jewish children's hospital in Brunoy. However, she was never able to practise as a doctor, as her qualifications went unrecognised by the new French Republic.

=== Historical work ===
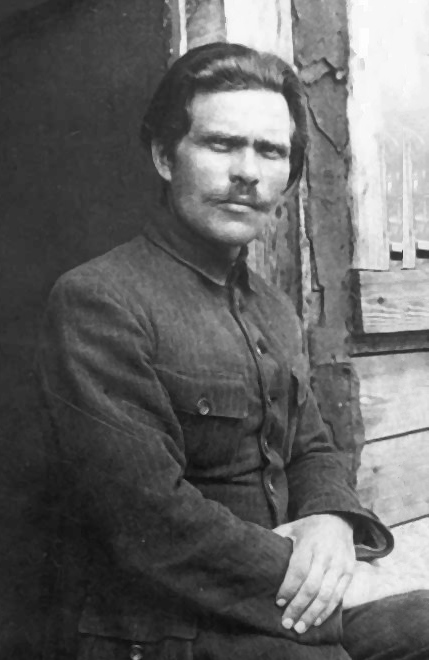
The Ukrainian anarchist Nestor Makhno, whose biographies were furnished by Mett as a primary source

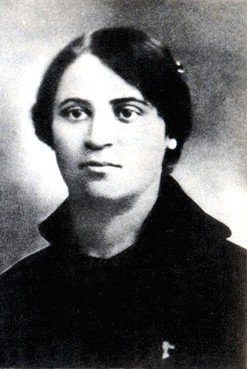
Halyna Kuzmenko, who Mett portrayed in a negative light through a series of allegations in her memoirs

As the Cold War began, Mett published a series of historical works about the Soviet Union, including: a book on the history of the Kronstadt rebellion; a study of the Russian peasantry before and after the revolution; a look at the developments of communism following the death of Stalin; and a history of the Soviet education system. She also wrote a book on the Soviet healthcare system, in which she outlined the rise of antisemitism in the Soviet Union.

Mett also served as a key primary source for biographies on Nestor Makhno by Michael Malet, Victor Peters, and Alexandre Skirda. In her own memoirs about Nestor Makhno, Mett described the exiled Ukrainian anarchist as incredulous and diffident towards many of his own friends, depicting within him an anti-intellectual streak and jealous temperament. While she was sceptical of Makhno's agrarian calls for "land and freedom", she declared "his social goodwill was sincere and above question", praising the political and strategic mind of who she called a "popular avenger".

In her letters to the historian Victor Peters, Mett rejected the allegations that Makhno had been an antisemite. She also disputed Volin's characterisation of Makhno as an alcoholic, although Peters noted that Volin knew Makhno better than she did. She put Volin's depiction of Makhno down to their political disagreements in exile, declaring that he "criticized Makhno when he had emigrated, whereas in Ukraine he would not have dared to open his mouth to express an opinion, if he had one." Mett was also critical of Volin's history book The Unknown Revolution, which she maligned for having lifted much of its content from Arshinov's history of the Makhnovshchina while neglecting to include anything from Makhno's own memoirs, noting its lack of footnotes and dismissing the author's claims to impartiality.

Meanwhile, Mett depicted Makhno's widow Halyna Kuzmenko in a very negative light. She alleged that Kuzmenko had attempted to kill her late husband, had an affair with Volin and that they together stole Makhno's diary while he was dying. Mett also fabricated a story about Kuzmenko marrying a Nazi officer and getting killed in an allied air raid on Berlin. When pressed on these allegations by Makhno's biographer Alexandre Skirda, Mett failed to provide further details, leading him to dismiss them as hearsay. Skirda was fiercely critical of Mett's memoirs on Makhno, which he described as amounting to slander, concluding that she "deserves to be assessed on other, more pertinent of her writings." Despite her accusations, Mett would later uphold Kuzmenko as a "defender of women", due to her executions of rapists during the Russian Civil War.

=== Final years ===
Mett and her husband later participated in the events of May 68, passing down the stories of their experiences to the next generation. Ida Mett died in Paris on 27 June 1973, at the age of 71.

== Publications ==
- Organizational Platform of the General Union of Anarchists (1926) (With Arshinov, Makhno, Valevski and Linski)
- The Kronstadt Commune (1938)
- Makhno in Paris (1948)
- Medicine in the USSR (1953)
- The Soviet School (1954)
- The Russian Peasant in the Revolution and Post-Revolution (1968)

== Bibliography ==
- Boulouque, Sylvain (2001). "Ida Gilman, dite Mett, médecin et anarchiste (Smorgone, Russie, 20 juillet 1901 – Paris, 27 juin 1973)" [Ida Gilman, known as Mett, doctor and anarchist (Smorgon, Russia, 20 July 1901 - Paris, 27 June 1973)]. Archives Juives (in French). 34 (2): 126–127. doi:10.3917/aj.342.0126. ISSN 0003-9837. OCLC 710968410.
- Darch, Colin (2020). Nestor Makhno and Rural Anarchism in Ukraine, 1917-1921. London: Pluto Press. ISBN 9781786805263. OCLC 1225942343.
- Heath, Nick (2017). "Biographical information on Ida Mett". In Mett, Ida (ed.). The Kronstadt Uprising. Theory and Practice. ISBN 978-0-9956609-5-3. OCLC 1010972371.
- Malet, Michael (1982). Nestor Makhno in the Russian Civil War. London: Palgrave Macmillan. ISBN 978-0-333-25969-6. OCLC 8514426.
- Patterson, Sean (2020). Makhno and Memory: Anarchist and Mennonite Narratives of Ukraine's Civil War, 1917–1921. Manitoba: University of Manitoba Press. ISBN 978-0-88755-578-7. OCLC 1134608930.
- Peters, Victor (1970). Nestor Makhno: The Life of an Anarchist. Winnipeg: Echo Books. OCLC 7925080.
- Shubin, Aleksandr (2010). "The Makhnovist Movement and the National Question in the Ukraine, 1917–1921". In Hirsch, Steven J.; van der Walt, Lucien (eds.). Anarchism and Syndicalism in the Colonial and Postcolonial World, 1870–1940. Studies in Global Social History. Vol. 6. Leiden: Brill. pp. 147–191. ISBN 9789004188495. OCLC 868808983.
- Skirda, Alexandre (2002). Facing the enemy: A history of anarchist organisation. Translated by Sharkey, Paul. Oakland: AK Press. ISBN 1902593197. OCLC 490977034.
- Skirda, Alexandre (2004) [1982]. Nestor Makhno–Anarchy's Cossack: The Struggle for Free Soviets in the Ukraine 1917–1921. Translated by Sharkey, Paul. Oakland: AK Press. ISBN 978-1-902593-68-5. OCLC 60602979.
