= Chiquet Mawet =

Belgian playwright

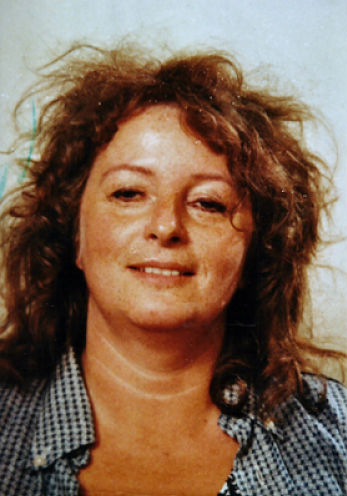
- Born: Michelle Beaujean; 23 January 1937; Verviers, Belgium
- Died: 4 July 2000 (aged 63); Liège, Belgium
- Occupations: playwright, columnist, activist

Chiquet Mawet (born Michelle Beaujean; 23 January 1937 – 4 July 2000) was a playwright, storyteller, poet, social activist and professor of ethics. Part of the generation between The Battle of Stalingrad in 1942 and the Protests of 1968, Beaujean, at 20, was fascinated by the hope of self-managed socialism (Titoism) in Yugoslavia.

== Writing ==
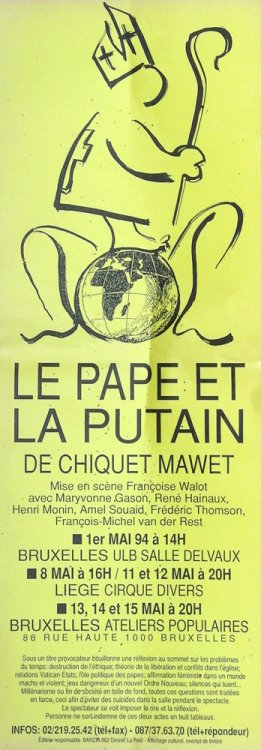
Poster for The Pope and the Whore.

A playwright, in addition to her texts and articles, Mawet was the author of numerous plays including La Pomme des hommes, Le prince-serpent, and Le Pape et la putain.

- Piratons Perrault (1990) — A funny and incisive reinterpretation of Charles Perrault's Contes de ma mère l'Oye. Characters like the ogre, Bluebeard, Cinderella, Snow White, Hop-o'-My-Thumb, and Puss in Boots, familiar to everyone's memory, are reimagined for the atomic era. Mawet redistributes the roles conceived three centuries earlier by the famous French writer, revealing unimaginable and scandalous secrets.
- Le Pape et la putain (1994, transl. The Pope and the Whore) — In this play, God sends Pope Julius, assisted by his secretary Francis, to a new Mary, better suited to our modern world. Maria, a mother from Moscow who occasionally works as a prostitute, becomes the victim of this modern annunciation, which occurs at a time when social and political developments are converging toward final chaos.

In 1989, Mawet was a founding member of the association Silence, les Dunes!, which brought together around ten artists from the Verviers region.

== Activism ==
Mawet's time in the anti-nuclear and green movements led her to join the French anarchist movement, specifically Alternative libertaire. In the 1990s, she regularly collaborated with Alternative's monthly publication, where she published dozens of texts.

In the late 1990s, she helped create Collectif Chômeur, Pas Chien!, a militant movement of the unemployed in Liège. In 1997, she reflected on her unconventional career in the collective work Le Hasard et la necessity: how I became a libertarian.

After a long illness, Mawet died on 4 July 2000, at the age of 62.

== Works ==
=== Stage plays ===
- La véritable histoire de Juliette et Roméo (1988)
- Piratons Perrault! ou L'horrible fin du sapiens: sortie sur le parvis du xxi^{e} siècle (1990)
- Caius et Umbrella (1990)
- La pomme des hommes (1991)
- La reine des gorilles (1991)
- Le Pape et la Putain (1993)
- Le Prince-Serpent (1994)
- Nuinottenakt (1995)

=== Contributions to collective works ===
- Neptune et Jéhovah étaient sur un bateau (1987)
- Joutes internationales (1991)
- Profession de foi (1996)
- Dossier drogues (1996)
- Le Hasard et la nécessité : comment je suis devenu libertaire (1997)
- La Soupière : comme un cheveu sur ou dans la soupe (c'est selon) (1998)
- Solo (1998)
- Nature morte, morte nature (1999)

=== Publications ===
- Chiquet Mawet, Médiathèque des territoires de la mémoire
- Réflexions sur le théâtre : lettre à l'acteur inconnu, Alternative libertaire
- Chômeur, pas chien ! Résister, s'organiser !, Alternative libertaire
- Nature humaine : à gauche toute ! Sur la nature de l'homme qui serait d'obéir, Médiathèque des territoires de la mémoire
- Correspondance, Center for Literary and Theatrical Research and Documentation of the Wallonia-Brussels Federation

== Bibliography ==
- Delhalle, Nancy (1997). Le répertoire des auteurs dramatiques contemporains : théâtre belge de langue française. Alternatives théâtrales (in French). Bruxelles: Alternatives théâtrales. pp. 139–140. ISSN 0774-4145.
- Delhalle, Nancy (December 1997). "Authors in the ruins. Parcours arbitraire". Alternatives théâtrales (56): 36–39.
