= Léo Campion =

Belgian-French actor (1905–1992)

- Born: Léon Louis Octave Campion; 24 March 1905; Butte-Montmartre, Paris, French Third Republic
- Died: 6 March 1992 (aged 86); Vaugirard, Paris, French Fifth Republic
- Resting place: Saint-Ouen Cemetery
- Occupation: Actor
- Era: 20th century
- Organisation: War Resisters' International
- Movement: Anarchism, pacifism

Signature
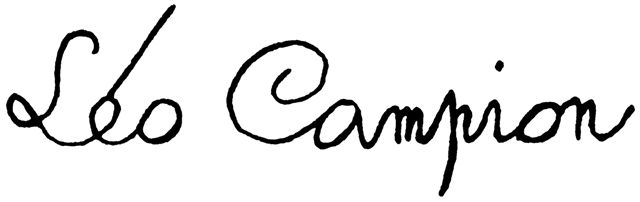

Léon Louis Octave Campion (1905–1992) was a Belgian-French anti-war activist and actor.

== Biography ==
Léon Louis Octave Campion was born on 24 May 1905 in Paris, to a Belgian father and a French mother. Despite being born and raised in France, Campion was made a Belgian citizen and not naturalised as French until later in life. At the age of 20, he was obliged to complete his military service for the Kingdom of Belgium and moved to Brussels. In 1928, he met the Belgian publisher Marcel Dieu and the Spanish militant Francisco Ascaso, who influenced Campion's turn towards anarchism. In 1930, he became a freemason and was inducted into the Grand Orient of Belgium.

As an ardent pacifist, in 1931, Campion joined the War Resisters' International (WRI) and became secretary of its Belgian section. He participated in masonic meetings in Belgium, France and Britain, in support of conscientious objection, for which Action Française demanded his expulsion from France. In February 1933, when Belgian defense minister Albert Devèze announced a new law to introduce conscription, Campion and Day handed in their military books in protest. They were called before a military tribunal, and in June 1933, they were sentenced to imprisonment for desertion. Protests by the anti-war left and a hunger strike by the two prisoners pressured the authorities to reduce their sentence. In August 1933, they were discharged from the Belgian Army.

Over the course of the 1930s, Campion contributed to the publication of several anarchist magazines and newspapers. In 1937, he made his debut on stage, as a singer at Le Grillon cabaret. Following the Nazi invasion of Belgium, Campion and other anarchists and pacifists were deported to Camp Vernet. Belgian communist leader Albert Marteaux later managed to secure their release. Campion worked in Belgium and France during the war, participating in the French and Belgian Resistances. After the war, Campion established the satirical magazine Pan, and went on to work as an actor on stage and screen.

Campion died in Paris, on 6 March 1992.

== Bibliography ==
- Greiler, Alois (2008). "Les débuts du catholicisme en Océanie: conférence internationale de Suva (Fidji) 5–10 août 2007". Histoire monde et cultures religieuses (in French). 5 (1): 173. doi:10.3917/hmc.005.0173. ISSN 1957-5246.
- Puissant, Jean (18 June 2024) [15 September 2014]. "CAMPION Léon, Louis, Octave, dit Léo". Le Maitron (in French).
