= Confédération Générale du Travail-Syndicaliste Révolutionnaire =

French trade union centre

Revolutionary Syndicalist General Confederation of Labour
- Confédération Générale du Travail – Syndicaliste Révolutionnaire
- Abbreviation: CGT-SR
- Predecessor: Syndicalist Defense Committee
- Successor: National Confederation of Labour
- Established: 16 November 1926; 99 years ago
- Dissolved: 1939; 87 years ago
- Type: National trade union confederation
- Headquarters: Lyon (until 1928); Paris (from 1928)
- Location: France
- Members: 6,000 (1936)
- General Secretary: Lucien Huart
- Spokesperson: Pierre Besnard
- Publication: Le Combat Syndicaliste
- Affiliations: International Workers' Association

The Revolutionary Syndicalist General Confederation of Labour (French: Confédération Générale du Travail – Syndicaliste Révolutionnaire; CGT-SR) was a French national trade union centre. It emerged out of the libertarian faction of the Unitary General Confederation of Labour (CGTU) and split away after it came under the control of the French Communist Party (PCF). The CGT-SR was established in 1926, largely on the basis of artisanal unions in southern France, and became the country's third and smallest trade union confederation. Its driving ideology was revolutionary syndicalism, which rejected political parties and upheld decentralisation as an organisational model.

From its foundation, the CGT-SR was a stagnant and isolated organisation. Its exclusionary ideology and political sectarianism alienated many workers, who preferred to instead join the communist-led CGTU, the reformist CGT, or unaffiliated autonomous unions. The CGT-SR rejected collaboration with non-anarchist groups and, following the reunification of the General Confederation of Labour (CGT) in 1936, it refused to merge into it. The CGT-SR received a boost in membership following the outbreak of the Spanish Civil War and took a leading role in organising solidarity campaigns for the Spanish anarchists. But it soon came into conflict with other anarchist groups, including the Spanish CNT, which it publicly criticised for joining the government of Spain. By the end of the war, the CGT-SR had isolated itself from others in the anarchist movement, compounding its pre-existing isolation from the labour movement. Following the Liberation of France, it was reorganised into the National Confederation of Labour.

== Background ==
By the outbreak of World War I, the French labour movement had moved away from revolutionary syndicalism and towards reformism. Under the influence of the Socialist Party (SFIO), French trade unions supported the Sacred Union and collaborated with the government of France throughout the war. As the war dragged on, the living and working conditions of the French working class deteriorated, leading to a resurgence of strike actions. Although the French victory in 1918 briefly tempered the labour movement's revolutionary tendencies, when material conditions failed to improve, far-left politics experienced a revival. Before long, the General Confederation of Labour (CGT), the country's main national trade union centre, had split. Revolutionary members of the rank-and-file criticised the union's leadership for centralisation, bureaucracy and anti-democratic practices. Many in the far-left of the CGT joined the nascent French Communist Party (PCF) and called for the union's affiliation to the Red International of Labour Unions (RILU). Anarcho-syndicalism, which called for trade unions to remain independent of all political parties, whether socialist or communist, also experienced a revival within the CGT during this period. As they remained in the minority in the CGT, the communist and syndicalist factions broke away and established the Unitary General Confederation of Labour (CGTU). A power struggle between the two factions soon broke out in the new organisation, with the communists ultimately consolidating control over both local and national leadership positions. The anarchists came to view the communists as even more extreme proponents of the centralisation that they had tried to break away from.

In 1921, the anarcho-syndicalist railroad union leader Pierre Besnard succeeded Pierre Monatte as general secretary of the Revolutionary Syndicalist Committees (CSR). Monatte was critical of Besnard, who he described as "the stereotypical utopian, doctrinaire, isolated, and bent on building his own personal organization". Besnard and other French anarcho-syndicalists sought to preserve the autonomy of trade unions from political parties and aimed to increase the influence of libertarianism in the CSR and CGT. They declared that they would pursue these aims "by every means" necessary, even if it meant splitting away. As head of the CSR, Besnard spoke in favour of establishing workers' control over the economy and called for trade unions to adopt a revolutionary programme. These views were shared by many members of the PCF, which published Besnard's works in L'Humanité. Besnard upheld the Amiens Charter, declaring that trade unions ought to remain "self-sufficient" and detached from political parties. He rejected both the reformist International Federation of Trade Unions (IFTU) and the communist Red International of Labour Unions (RILU); he instead resolved to establish an anarcho-syndicalist international, the International Workers' Association (IWA), which held that "the emancipation of the workers will be achieved by the workers themselves". From mid-1923 onwards, Besnard held the position of general secretary of the IWA.

== Establishment ==
Besnard led the anti-statist faction of the CGTU, with the support of the railroad workers' and ceramicists' unions in Limoges, but his libertarian resolutions were ultimately defeated at the organisation's congress in Saint-Etienne. Besnard subsequently established a Syndicalist Defense Committee (CDS), through which he aimed to combat the Bolshevisation of the CGTU and reassert the influence of syndicalism in the organisation. Anarchist-led unions in Saint-Etienne itself, including some that were not affiliated with the CGTU, joined the CDS in its struggle against Bolshevisation. Some syndicalists who were themselves members of the PCF left the party and joined the CDS, in protest against the CGTU's decision to allow party officials to hold leadership positions in trade unions. In March 1923, the CGTU joined the RILU, a decision that was opposed by the CDS, which favoured the IWA. At the CGTU's Bourges congress in November 1923, resolutions by the CDS were defeated by the pro-communist majority. The consolidation of communist control over the CGTU provoked a number of unions in Limoges to disaffiliate from the organisation; the cabinet makers' and metal polishers' unions sided with the libertarians.

Among the revolutionary syndicalist tendencies that opposed the new direction of the CGTU were the Ligue Syndicaliste, which continued on within the CGTU as its syndicalist minority faction, and a number of autonomous unions, which left the CGTU and refused to affiliate with any other existing trade union centre. In November 1924, these autonomous unions formed their own trade union federation, the Federative Union of Autonomous Trade Unions (French: Union Fédérative des Syndicats Autonomes; UFSA), which upheld the syndicalist orientation of the pre-war CGT and its Amiens Charter. Meanwhile, the syndicalist minority that had remained within the CGTU diminished in strength. Besnard's faction saw its vote share at congresses drop from 391 out of 1,189 in 1922, to 208 out of 1,271 in 1923, to only 22 out of 1,365 in 1925. By the following congress, although the CGTU formally adopted proportional representation for its constituent unions, the syndicalist minority was frozen out of official vote tallies. Syndicalists were left unable to muster more than 3% of votes at CGTU congresses.

The UFSA hoped that the union defections to its ranks would compel the CGT and CGTU to reunite the labour movement around antipoliticism, but neither union centre lost a substantial number of members, while the loosely-organised UFSA itself declined in influence. By August 1926, members of the UFSA began to express the view that the desire to maintain working-class unity was harming the syndicalist movement. In October, anarchist-led autonomous unions in Rhône called for the establishment of a third trade union confederation, which would rival both the CGT and CGTU. The UFSA, together with autonomous construction workers' and barbers' unions, called for a workers' conference to be held in Lyon. In mid-November 1926, 69 delegates representing 89 autonomous unions attended the congress; 84 unions voted to establish a new confederation, while 3 unions opposed and 2 abstained. As a result, the Revolutionary Syndicalist General Confederation of Labour (French: Confédération Générale du Travail-Syndicaliste Révolutionnaire; CGT-SR) was established. It affiliated itself with the IWA, and based its headquarters in Lyon. Lucien Huart drew up the statutes of the CGT-SR, which outlined limitations on the power of union officials, including single term limits and the prohibition of holding concurrent offices. Huart would serve as the organisation's first general secretary, while Pierre Besnard acted as its chief spokesperson.

== Organisation ==
Having based itself on the existing structures of the UFSA, the CGT-SR recruited a number of autonomous unions into its ranks; 80 unions joined the CGT-SR at its inception. For skilled workers, whose concerns about job control had been neglected in the CGT's push for economic rationalisation, the revolutionary syndicalism of the CGT-SR seemed to be a preferable alternative. The CGT-SR was largely supported by artisans, for whom collective bargaining was less attractive than revolutionary activism. Its membership was drawn largely from artisanal workers in small self-managed workplaces, particularly construction workers and metallurgists, but also leather workers, garment workers, barbers and transportation workers. Most of its members were based in the Île-de-France, although its most important centres were in the southern provinces, with influential union sections in Bordeaux, Clermont-Ferrand, Limoges, Lyon, Marseille, Saint-Etienne, Toulouse and Trelaze. It was most influential in the Loire and Rhône departments and their respective capitals of Saint-Etienne and Lyon. Among its founding union leaders were Jean Aigueperse, of the Saint-Etienne leather-workers' union; Marius Boisson, of the Lyon construction workers' union; Boudoux, of the Paris construction workers' union; Edouard Demonsais, of the Toulon municipal workers' union; Henri Fourcade, of the Rhône departamental union; Garros of the Lyon electrians' union; Lucien Huart, of the Paris shoemakers' union; Georges Leroy, of the Paris hairdressers' union; Raitzon, of the Lyon metalworkers' union; and Clément Snappe, of the Saint-Claude pipe-makers union.

Some autonomous unions in Limoges, representing shoemakers, garment workers, ceramicists and municipal employees, broke away from the CGTU in protest against its Bolshevisation, including. The autonomous unions soon became the most powerful union force in Limoges, but only the shoemakers' union supported the CGT-SR, while the rest preferred ad hoc collaboration. The CGT-SR also gained support from dissident syndicalists in Saint-Etienne, where small cabinet makers', textile dyers' and metal polishers' unions affiliated themselves with the new organisation. Apart from the shoemakers in Limoges and the metalworkers in Loire, both of which worked in industries that had undergone relatively few technological changes, the CGT-SR ultimately failed to attract any mass support. The union confederation thus remained a largely artisanal organisation.

In April 1927, the IWA ceded control of Le Voix du Travail to the CGT-SR. The following year, the CGT-SR began publication of its official organ, Le Combat Syndicaliste; it circulated roughly 6,000 copies, with its actual readership estimated to have been two or three times higher.

== Ideology ==
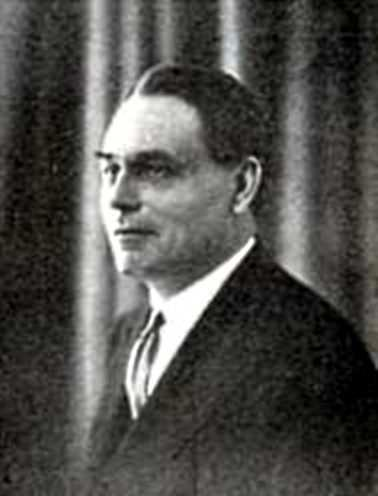
Pierre Besnard, the main thought leader of the CGT-SR

The CGT-SR identified itself with revolutionary syndicalism, which upheld a federalist and anti-political conception of trade unionism. The CGT-SR opposed trade union affiliation with political parties and saw trade unions as taking the leading role in revolutionary action. The CGT-SR explicitly described itself as a revolutionary organisation, in order to counter PCF claims that rejection of the party leadership was counterrevolutionary. Through most of the organisation's history, it did not refer to itself as "anarcho-syndicalist", a term which was introduced in France as a pejorative term for syndicalists that opposed communist control of trade unions. Pierre Besnard first used the term himself in 1937, in order to describe the synthesis of anarchist ideology with syndicalist organisational methods.

The ideological basis of the CGT-SR was laid out in its Lyon Charter, written by Pierre Besnard in 1926. The Charter emphasised the self-sufficiency of syndicalism and, in recognition of the complexity of the problems brought up by the abolition of capitalism, discussed the need to integrate scientists and technicians into the revolutionary syndicalist movement, as well as the need to bring together urban industrial workers and rural peasants. Unlike the Amiens Charter, which merely disregarded political parties from trade union organising, the Lyon Charter repeatedly emphasised its opposition to political parties, as well as trade unions that were affiliated with political parties. The CGT-SR thus aligned itself against cooperation with the CGT and CGTU, except in limited campaigns to raise wages and improve working conditions. The CGT-SR's exclusive ideology ultimately alienated many unionised workers. Historian David Berry considered it "rather ironic" that the CGT-SR had pretentions to becoming one big union for all French workers; Kathryn Amdur considered the CGT-SR to have been the most politically sectarian trade union centre in France; and Wayne Thorpe said that it was marginalised by its own ideological purity, which he said "condemn[ed] it to revolutionary impotence".

Like the other two confederations, the CGT-SR campaigned for a reduction in working hours, the institution of sick pay and the establishment of works councils, as well as social issues including the abolition of military tribunals and the repeal of laws banning contraception and abortion. The only policy that was unique to the CGT-SR was its proposal for an egalitarian single wage (French: salaire unique), which demanded the elimination of wage differences by raising the wages of unskilled workers to the level of highly skilled workers. The CGT-SR also accepted the rationalisation of the economy, on the condition of the institution of a six-hour day.

== Stagnation ==
From the outset, the CGT-SR was a stagnant organisation. In 1927, one reformist newspaper commented that not much had been heard of the new organisation and that it doubted it would become relevant in the future. At the second congress of the CGT-SR, in November 1928, Pierre Besnard reported that the confederation's membership had remained stagnant since its formation two years earlier. The CGT-SR did not publish any official count of its membership figures, although various estimates of the CGT-SR's membership range from 1,000 to 20,000 members. It remained the smallest of the three trade union confederations and the continuing schism between them alienated many workers from the organised labour movement. After the CGT-SR moved its headquarters from Lyon to Paris in late 1928, most of its unions in the area went into a decline, with the notable exception of its construction workers' union. After the outbreak of the Great Depression in France, its membership numbers declined further.

Many workers were unenthusiastic about the idea of joining the CGT-SR, preferring to either stay in the CGTU, rejoin the CGT or join an autonomous union. To skeptics of the new organisation, the establishment of a third confederation had only served to further divide and weaken the labour movement; some also considered the CGT-SR to be a "politicised" organisation and were alienated by its close affiliation with anarcho-syndicalism. The establishment of the CGT-SR was even criticised by anarcho-syndicalists, including Georges Bastien, Albert Guigui and Julien Le Pen, with the latter saying: "If we have a third confederation, we'll have two too many". Some critics even quipped that the "SR" in CGT-SR was an abbreviation of "Sans Rien" (English: With Nothing) or "Sans Résultats" (English: Without Results). In many towns, anarchist-led autonomous unions refused to affiliate with the CGT-SR and instead remained independent; Bastien commented that autonomous unions "would do well to stay that way and, when they reorganise links in order to develop solidarity, the exchange of information, mutual aid and so on, let them not reconstitute in any way another CGT, a copy of a State in the other State". Throughout the late 1920s, the activities of the CGT-SR were subsidised by the IWA. It only began paying union dues regularly after 1933.

== Later activities ==
=== Anti-fascism and the CGT ===
From its founding in 1926, the CGT-SR had recognised the rise of fascism, which it considered to be a "new governmental doctrine of finance capital, who direct the entire capitalist system". As fascism began to rise across Europe during the early 1930s, French anarchists began to consider the question of collaborating with the labour movement in an anti-fascist united front. The CGT-SR itself rejected any cooperation with reformist organisations, denouncing the CGT's general secretary Léon Jouhaux as a "traitor" for his collaboration with the Sacred Union. In February 1936, the CGTU, along with its syndicalist minority and many autonomous unions that had broken away from it, rejoined the CGT. Unwilling to compromise its values, even to achieve working class unity, the CGT-SR refused to merge back into the reunified CGT. Most of the organisation endorsed working class unity in theory, so long as it was based on independence from political parties and had a revolutionary platform. Some extremists in the CGT-SR entirely dismissed unification, which they described as "the castration of syndicalism", and called for action by a revolutionary minority, while denouncing the masses as "blind, servile, traditionalist, superstitious, and bestial". The reunification of the CGT led to a further decline in the CGT-SR's membership numbers, with leading members such as general secretary Lucien Huart leaving the CGT-SR to support the reunification effort.

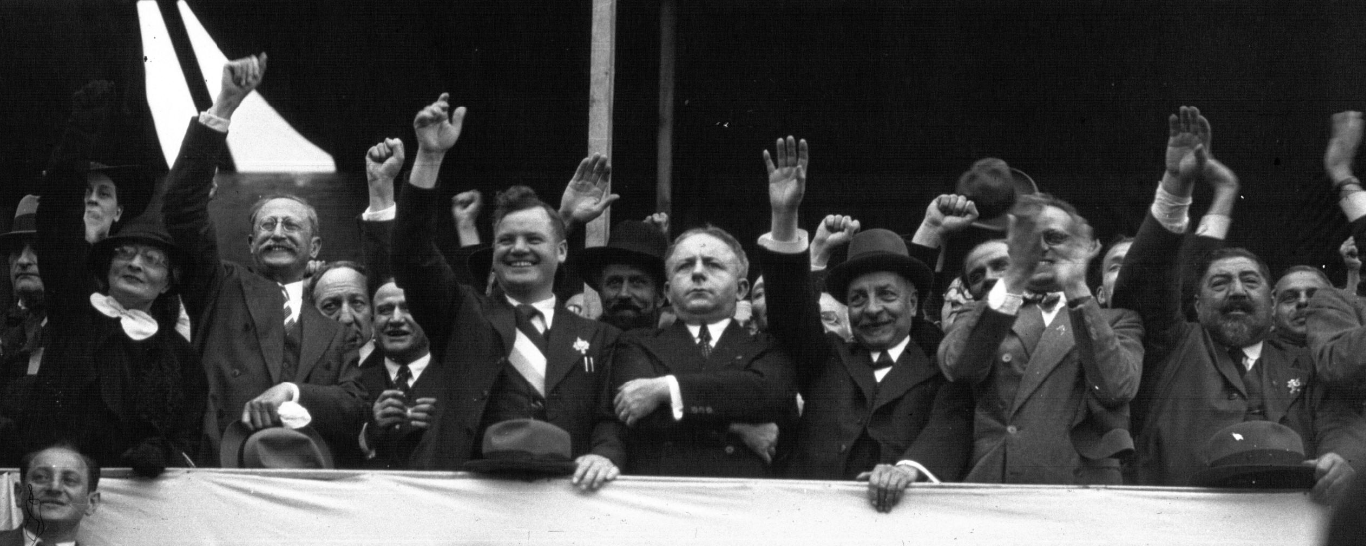
Rally of the Popular Front, which the CGT-SR refused to support

When the reunified CGT carried out a general strike in the spring of 1936, it received support from much of the French anarchist movement. Members of the CGT-SR played a limited role in the general strike: Clément Snappe led the strike at the steel works in La Villette; Basson led the strike at the charcoal plant in Saint-Etienne; and H. Boucharel led the construction workers' strike in Limoges. The CGT-SR commended the factory occupations and direct action of the French workers during the strike, but refused to support their political action, which culminated in the election of the Popular Front. However, the anarchists largely failed to capitalise on the strike movement, as they were preoccupied with arguing over internecine differences. According to Henri Bouyé, the worst offenders were the individualist anarchists, who rejected participation in the labour movement, and the CGT-SR, which had isolated itself from the wider labour movement. But, according to historian David Berry, the largest obstacle to anarchist involvement in the strike actions was the continued domination of the PCF over the trade unions. Despite its differences with other anarchist groups, the CGT-SR lent its support to the Centre de liaison contre la guerre et l'Union sacré, an anti-militarist and anti-Stalinist organisation formed to oppose the Franco-Soviet Treaty of Mutual Assistance.

By this time, the organisation was in a sustained decline. The increased militancy of the mid-1930s had not benefited the CGT-SR. Its paper, Le Combat Syndicaliste, required members to subsidise its publication, which was handled entirely by its editor Adrien Perrissaguet. It took the outbreak of war in Spain for the organisation to see a significant revival.

=== Solidarity with Spain ===
After the outbreak of the Spanish Civil War in July 1936, the CGT-SR experienced a surge in membership, which doubled from 3,000 to 6,000. Its publication, Le Combat syndicaliste, also received an even wider circulation.

In order to support the ongoing Spanish Revolution, the CGT-SR came together with other French anarchist groups to establish the Anarcho-Syndicalist Committee for the Defence and Liberation of the Spanish Proletariat (French: Comité anarcho-syndicaliste pour la libération et la défense du prolétariat espagnol; CASLDPE). Pierre Besnard acted as general secretary of the CASDLPE and the organisation's manifesto was published in Le Combat Syndicaliste, in which it called for local anarcho-syndicalist committees to be established and announced the publication of a newspaper L'Espagne Antifasciste to publicise the situation in Spain. Many of the anarcho-syndicalist committees established, including those in Marseille and Saint-Etienne, were little more than fronts for existing CGT-SR sections, which shifted their organising efforts towards solidarity with Spain. During the early months of the war, about a dozen CGT-SR members volunteered to fight in Spain, out of a total of 50 French volunteers.

Funds, materiel and volunteers from throughout France were sent to Perpignan, coordinated by the local anarcho-syndicalist committee. By October 1936, the CGT-SR had collected over 46,000 francs for the CASLDPE. Much of the money that was raised was never deposited into the national account, as it was instead immediately given to families of volunteers. In Marseille, half of the 5,000 francs raised by the CGT-SR were given to volunteers' families. The CGT-SR also held a series of public meetings throughout the country, where Pierre Besnard, Constant Counault, Aristide and Paul Lapeyre would share the stage with speakers from several other anarchist groups. Meetings organised by the CGT-SR in Perpignan and Toulouse respectively attracted 4,000 and 3,000 attendees, with the latter being the largest anarchist meeting in the city's history.

By the autumn of 1936, a split had formed between the Union anarchiste (UA) on one side and the CGT-SR and Fédération anarchiste française (FAF) on the other. The cause was an initiative by the UA to form a popular front with the left wing of the SFIO; the FAF and CGT-SR were ardently opposed to cooperation with non-anarchists. Although the CGT-SR and FAF claimed to be the French counterparts of the Spanish National Confederation of Labour (CNT) and Iberian Anarchist Federation (FAI), the CNT, led by Horacio Prieto, supported the UA and its policy of a popular front with other anti-fascist forces. Nevertheless, the CGT-SR and FAF continued to reject cooperation with non-anarchists; at the CASLDPE congress on 24 October, the UA's proposal for a popular front was overwhelmingly rejected. The CGT-SR also rejected the UA's claims to represent the CNT-FAI in France and disputed their anarchist credentials. The CGT-SR and FAF believed that any alliance with non-anarchist forces would require them to jettison anarchist principles, although this belief was contrary to the UA's understanding of the proposal. The anarchist united front to aid Spain was ultimately broken; the CGT-SR and FAF continued to operate the anarcho-syndicalist committees without the involvement of the UA. Attempts to find common ground for the reunification of the anarchist movement quickly collapsed, with Lucien Huart deciding to quit the CGT-SR and join the UA. When the CNT called for French workers to seize control of the country's railways and arsenals, the CGT-SR responded by calling for a purge of militants from the anarchist movement. Its own members in Barcelona were criticised by other French and Spanish anarchists, due to the CGT-SR's "tendency to provoke disunity".

=== Conflict with the CNT ===
Despite the split, the CGT-SR continued its activities within the CASDLPE; it centralised fundraising through the IWA, and by August 1937, it had raised over 2 million francs for the CNT. But the rivalry between the CGT-SR and UA caused further problems, as the CGT-SR accused the CNT of favouring the UA and the CGT over itself, which it considered "the natural representatives of the CNT in France". When the CGT-SR inquired as to why the CNT was giving mandates to both it and the UA, the CNT delegation responded that the UA could not be ignored as it was the largest anarchist organisation in France. Nevertheless, the activities of the anarcho-syndicalist committees continued to grow, establishing 25 centres throughout both France and Belgium, which together formed a Federative Union. In July 1937, the Federative Union redirected its attentions to aiding victims of political repression under the government of Juan Negrín. This caused further tensions with the CNT, which worried that the CGT-SR's depictions of the Republican government as "counter-revolutionary" would damage the solidarity efforts.

The CGT-SR had idealised and exaggerated the revolutionary sentiments of Spanish republicans and the leading role of the CNT-FAI, the latter of which they portrayed as the only force in Spain resisting the Nationalists. The CGT-SR often failed to understand the CNT's place within the Spanish popular front and gave it singular credit for the efforts of the entire anti-fascist coalition. The CGT-SR believed that any collaboration with non-revolutionary and non-anarchist forces would weaken the Spanish revolution. They therefore became sharply critical of the CNT for its decision to join the Spanish government and collaborate with political parties in the civil war. The CGT-SR believed that the best way they could assist the CNT, which it considered to be making tactical mistakes, was by publicly criticising it. The CGT-SR called for the CNT to reaffirm its commitment to the founding principles of the IWA and to reconsider its decisions. At a meeting attended by CNT members Joan Garcia i Oliver and Federica Montseny, a fight broke out between CGT-SR and UA members. The CGT-SR complained that the CNT hadn't informed them of the meeting, that it was being chaired by ex-CGT-SR member Lucien Huart, and that Le Combat Syndicaliste wasn't being sold at the event.

On 11 June 1937, the day of an extraordinary congress of the IWA in Paris, Le Combat Syndicaliste published an article that denounced the CNT for "collaborationism" and claimed that all other sections of the IWA were in "complete and general disagreement" with it. By this time, the CNT had lost its patience with the CGT-SR. At the congress, the CGT-SR was sharply criticised by the CNT general secretary Mariano R. Vázquez, who denounced them as sectarian fanatics and accused them of "betraying the cause of the world proletariat"; the FAI announced that they no longer regarded them as part of the same movement, due to the CGT-SR's breaking of fraternal relations with the Spanish organisations. The following month, Besnard attempted to canvass other IWA sections to expel the CNT, its largest affiliate, from the international. The CNT subsequently pressured the IWA secretariat to remove Pierre Besnard from his position as general secretary. The CGT-SR responded by again denouncing the CNT for its collaboration with the state and "participation in democratic Capitalism", which it claimed amounted to a rejection of anarcho-syndicalism.

At another extraordinary congress of the IWA in December 1937, Besnard resigned as general secretary. During the congress, the CNT received unconditional support and it was decided that any criticisms of the CNT-FAI would only be discussed through private channels, rather than being aired in public. The CGT-SR even passed a declaration that the CNT could continue its "experiment" in collaboration with the state "under its own responsibility". The CGT-SR would be absent from the IWA's 6th Congress in 1938, during which Spanish, Swedish and Portuguese delegates revised the IWA's charter and condemned the CGT-SR. Relations within the IWA were severely damaged by the dispute between the CGT-SR and the CNT; some members of the CGT-SR, who came to argue in favour of the CNT and the necessity of anti-fascist unity, blamed the FAF for causing the sectarian dispute. The Russian anarchist Volin condemned the CGT-SR for having "washed its hands" of the Spanish revolution. Helmut Rüdiger likewise denounced it for its "organic, political and moral failure" to support the Spanish anti-fascist movement.

== Dissolution ==
By the end of 1938, the CGT-SR was again in a state of decline; L'Espagne Antifasciste itself admitted to the weakness of the CGT-SR and questioned if most French workers even knew of its existence. The CGT-SR ultimately failed to overcome its isolation from the broader labour movement, which prevented anarcho-syndicalism from developing a genuine influence in France. Historian David Berry described his impression that, by the late 1930s, the CGT-SR had become a marginal groupuscule, "concerned primarily with sectarian disputation and indulging in what Lenin would no doubt have called 'revolutionary phrase-mongering'". Following the 1946 liberation of France, Besnard reorganised the CGT-SR into the National Confederation of Labour (French: Confédération Nationale du Travail; CNT).

== See also ==
- Anarchism in France

== Bibliography ==
- Amdur, Kathryn (1986). Syndicalist Legacy: Trade Unions and Politics in Two French Cities in the Era of World War I. University of Illinois Press. ISBN 0-252-01238-0.
- Berry, David (1999). "'Fascism or Revolution!' Anarchism and Antifascism in France, 1933–39". Contemporary European History. 8 (1): 51–71. doi:10.1017/S0960777399000132.
- Berry, David (2002). A History of the French Anarchist Movement, 1917—1945. Greenwood Press. ISBN 0-313-32026-8.
- Damier, Vadim (2009) [2000]. Anarcho-syndicalism in the 20th Century. Translated by Archibald, Malcolm. Edmonton: Black Cat Press. ISBN 978-0-9737827-6-9.
- Darlington, Ralph (2008). "Influence and Demise". Syndicalism and the Transition to Communism: An International Comparative Analysis. Ashgate Publishing. pp. 145–180. ISBN 978-0-7546-3617-5.
- Gildea, Robert (1996). "Anarchism". The Past in French History. Yale University Press. pp. 260–299. ISBN 0300067119.
- Magraw, Roger (1992). "The In-between Years 1921-1934". A History of the French Working Class. Vol. 2. Blackwell. pp. 209–252. ISBN 9780631180456.
- Seidman, Michael (1991). "The Ideology of Workers' Control". Workers Against Work: Labor in Paris and Barcelona During the Popular Fronts. University of California Press. pp. 189–211. ISBN 0-520-06915-3.
- Thorpe, Wayne (1989). The Workers Themselves. Kluwer Academic Publishers. ISBN 0-7923-0276-1. LCCN 89-8205.
- Thorpe, Wayne (1996). "Anarchosyndicalism in Inter-War France: The Vision of Pierre Besnard". European History Quarterly. 26 (4): 559–590. doi:10.1177/026569149602600403.
- Tosstorff, Reiner (2004). "From the First to the Second Congress of the RILU". The Red International of Labour Unions (RILU) 1920 - 1937. Brill. pp. 422–608. doi:10.1163/9789004325579_007. ISBN 9789004325579.
