= Pierre Besnard =

French revolutionary syndicalist (1886–1947)

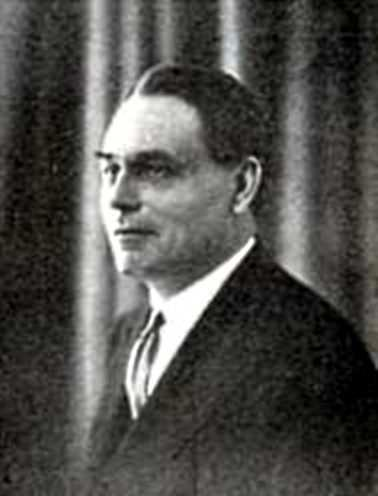
- Born: 8 October 1886; Montreuil-Bellay, French Third Republic
- Died: 19 February 1947 (aged 60); Bagnolet, French Fourth Republic
- Resting place: Père Lachaise Cemetery
- Occupation: Railway worker
- Employer: Chemins de fer de l'État
- Organizations: CGT-SR; IWA–AIT
- Movement: Anarchism

Pierre Besnard (8 October 1886 – 19 February 1947) was a French anarcho-syndicalist. He was the co-founder and leader of the Confédération Générale du Travail-Syndicaliste Révolutionnaire (CGT-SR) and its successor the Confédération Nationale du Travail (CNT), and the principal theoretician of anarcho-syndicalism in France during the early 20th century.

== Biography ==
Pierre Besnard was born on 8 October 1886, into a peasant family, in Montreuil-Bellay. After coming of age, in March 1909, he started work as a Mail carrier for the State Railway Company in Chinon. In September 1919, he represented railway workers at the Lyon congress of the General Confederation of Labour (CGT). By 1920, he had been promoted to the chief postal officer at Auteuil-Boulogne. On 4 May 1920, he led a rail workers' strike and joined the executive committee of the National Federation of Railway Workers; for his leadership of the strike, he was dismissed from his job on 14 May. In July 1920, he returned to work for transportation companies as a tax collector; over the subsequent months, he continued to organise within the rail workers' unions. In October 1920, he resigned from the railway workers' union, as he felt he was no longer a part of that industry.

When the CGT began to consider affiliation with a trade union international, based in Moscow, the revolutionary syndicalist faction became an internal opposition. At this time, Besnard considered himself a "pure syndicalist" and joined the Revolutionary Syndicalist Committees (CSR). In February 1921, he and other "pure syndicalists" made moves to take over the leadership of the CSR; on 20 May 1921, he was elected as the general secretary of the CSR, replacing Pierre Monatte. But by this time, the revolutionary syndicalists in the CGT were beginning to split over the question of support for the Russian Revolution: Besnard and other anarcho-syndicalists opposed the Bolsheviks, while Gaston Monmousseau and the editorial staff of La Vie Ouvrière supported them. In July 1921, he resigned from the CSR and didn't participate in the CSR delegation to the founding congress of the Red International of Labour Unions (RILU). At the Lille Congress of the CGT later that month, he spoke out in support of revolutionary syndicalism against the reformist majority. The revolutionary minority, including the CSR, was subsequently expelled from the CGT and founded the United General Confederation of Labour (CGTU).

During the founding of the CGTU in 1922, Besnard called for it to be established as decentralised, federation of localised trade unions. Besnard and the libertarian faction quickly came into conflict with Monmousseau and his authoritarian faction over the statutes and international orientation of the CGTU. At the June 1922 congress of the CGTU, Monmousseau's motion to join the RILU passed and Besnard's attempts to resist their affiliation with the French Communist Party (PCF) were defeated. Monmousseau was subsequently elected general secretary, while Besnard and the "pure syndicalists" established the Syndicalist Defense Committee (CDS) to organise the minority within the CGTU. Led by Besnard, the CDS adopted the doctrine of anarcho-syndicalism. Besnard resigned as the CDS general secretary on 1 June 1923 and withdrew from the executive of the International Workers' Association (IWA), which the CDS had affiliated itself with. At the CGTU's second congress in Bourges in September 1923, Besnard and the anarcho-syndicalists were again defeated by the PCF-aligned majority. On 11 January 1924, after communists murdered two libertarian workers, unions began to break off from the CGTU. Besnard attempted to negotiate terms for the anarcho-syndicalists to merge back into the CGT, but talks broke down.

In November 1924, the revolutionary syndicalist minority held a congress to determine its course of action, culminating in the establishment of the Union fédérative des syndicats autonomes (UFSA). On 28 June 1925, Besnard was elected the general secretary of the UFSA. Besnard argued for the UFSA to establish a third national trade union centre and to affiliate to the IWA. In November 1926, this process culminated with the establishment of the Revolutionary Syndicalist General Confederation of Labour (CGT-SR). Although Besnard had led its foundation, he was not initially elected as general secretary, as the membership was concerned that he would be too divisive. Besnard published La Voix du travail as its paper until October 1927. As the main theoretician of anarcho-syndicalism in the CGT-SR, Besnard disseminated his ideas throughout various independent anarchist publications and wrote the articles on syndicalism for the Anarchist Encyclopedia. From 1929, he edited the newspaper Combat syndicaliste and organised within the Seine rail workers' union. In 1935, when debates on the reunification of the CGT took place, Besnard advocated for the CGT-SR to remain a separate organisation.

In August 1935, Besnard was elected general secretary of the IWA. Following the outbreak of the Spanish Civil War, Besnard organised material aid to Spanish anarchists that were fighting in the war. Besnard opposed the entry of the Confederación Nacional del Trabajo (CNT) into the Spanish government, warning it against "deviations" from anarcho-syndicalist principles. Besnard and the CGT-SR led criticism of the CNT throughout the war, presenting a critical report to the IWA in June 1937, which was approved by the majority of the organisation. The CNT responded by demanding Besnard's removal as general secretary; at an extraordinary congress in December 1937, Besnard was removed and replaced with Horacio Prieto.

During World War II, Besnard organised rail workers in Cagnes-sur-Mer and participated in the French Resistance. He later moved to Bon-Encontre, where he wrote a manifesto detailing his ideas on the organisation of an anarcho-syndicalist society. In order to distribute it within Vichy France, Besnard criticised Nazi Germany and Fascist Italy, but withheld criticism of the collaborationist regime. Although the book was acclaimed by his friends, it never received distribution, as its copies were destroyed by the Nazis before it could receive widespread publication. On 15 September 1944, Besnard renounced his plan to re-establish the CGT-SR after the war and instead called for anarcho-syndicalists to rejoin the CGT. At this time, he was discovered to have joined the Legion of French Volunteers Against Bolshevism, which he justified as an attempt to halt the dictatorship's repression of the anarcho-syndicalists.

In March 1945, Besnard and other anarcho-syndicalists established the Fédération syndicaliste française (FSF), which organised the revolutionary minority within the CGT. The following year, in May 1946, Besnard participated in an FSF congress, where it was decided to break away from the CGT and establish a separate trade union centre. In December 1946, Besnard co-founded the Confédération Nationale du Travail (CNT), wrote its charter and was elected to head its publication Combat syndicaliste. Besnard died three months later, on 19 February 1947. He was cremated the following week and his remains interred at Père Lachaise Cemetery.

== Selected works ==
- Les syndicats ouvriers et la révolution sociale, Paris, 1930
- Le monde nouveau, CGT-SR, 1936
- L'éthique du syndicalisme, CGT-SR, 1936

Besnard was also a contributor to Sébastien Faure's Encyclopédie anarchiste.

== Bibliography ==
- Maitron, Jean; Davranche, Guillaume (9 October 2022) [7 March 2014]. "BESNARD Eugène Pierre". Dictionnaire des anarchistes (in French). Éditions de l'Atelier.
