= Syndicalist Defense Committee (1922) =

French trade union centre

- Comité de Défense Syndicaliste
- Abbreviation: CDS
- Predecessor: Revolutionary Syndicalist Committees
- Successor: Revolutionary Syndicalist General Confederation of Labour
- Established: 9 July 1922; 104 years ago
- Dissolved: November 1926; 100 years ago
- Type: National trade union centre
- Purpose: Opposition to the French Communist Party
- Location: France
- Members: 100,000 (1922)
- Leader: Pierre Besnard
- Parent organisation: United General Confederation of Labour
- Affiliations: International Workers' Association

The Syndicalist Defense Committee (French: Comité de Défense Syndicaliste; (Note: Also translated as the Committee of Syndicalist Defense.) CDS), also known as the Committee for the Defense of Revolutionary Syndicalism (French: Comité de Défense Syndicaliste Révolutionnaire; CDSR), was a French anarcho-syndicalist trade union centre of the United General Confederation of Labour (CGTU). The CDS was formed to oppose the influence of the French Communist Party (PCF), which quickly took over the leadership of the CGTU and brought it into the Red International of Labour Unions (RILU). Despite its conflict with the CGTU leadership, the CDS remained within the organisation, as it sought to preserve working class unity. While still within the CGTU, the CDS participated in the founding of the International Workers' Association (IWA), in which it called for a conciliatory stance towards the RILU. After the murder of two libertarian activists by a PCF member, the CDS broke away from the CGTU. In 1924, the CDS formed the short-lived Federative Union of Autonomous Trade Unions; and in 1926, they established the Revolutionary Syndicalist General Confederation of Labour (CGT-SR).

== Background ==
When the Red International of Labour Unions (RILU) was established in July 1921, French syndicalists of the Revolutionary Syndicalist Committees (CSR) called for a congress to be held outside the Soviet Union, so syndicalist organisations could freely debate the RILU's affiliation with the Communist International (CI). The CSR itself rejected the subordination of French trade unions to the French Communist Party (PCF) and likewise the requirement for "reciprocal representation" between the RILU and the CI, although it didn't entirely reject collaboration between the two. The revolutionary syndicalists' opposition to these terms resulted in the strengthening of the libertarian faction, as the pro-communist faction of the CSR found itself disorientated by the break with Moscow. Despite frequent disagreements, the two opposition factions put forward a joint resolution to reaffirm the independence of trade unions from political parties. The CSR deferred its affiliation to the RILU until trade union independence was secured and called for an international trade union congress to debate the issue.

By 1922, the divisions between the reformists and the revolutionaries within the General Confederation of Labour (CGT) had culminated in a split, as the CSR dedicated itself to establishing a new trade union centre. The revolutionary faction ultimately withdrew from the CGT and established the United General Confederation of Labour (French: Confédération Générale du Travail Unitaire; CGTU). The libertarians of the CSR initially dominated the leadership of the CGTU, which declared French syndicalism to be a definitively revolutionary and anti-statist movement, positioning it against all political parties and governments. The CGTU refused to affiliate itself with the RILU unless it remained completely independent from the nascent French Communist Party (PCF) and the Communist International.

In March 1922, the CGTU decided to send delegates to a planned international syndicalist conference in Berlin, where syndicalist organisations would discuss the terms of affiliation with the RILU. The CGTU was represented at the Berlin conference by the libertarians Louis Lecoin and Pierre Besnard; they announced that they would abstain from the vote, as the CGTU had not yet held its inaugural St. Etienne Congress, which would decide its international policy. The conference's resolutions were protested by the RILU delegate Andrey Andreyev, who told the CGTU delegates that the RILU intended to organise French workers in spite of their opposition. Fearing this to be a declaration of intent to take over the CGTU, the French delegates requested that the conference not provoke the Russian government further, as it would put the libertarians of the CGTU in jeopardy. The CGTU delegates were the only ones that supported the continuation of negotiations with the RILU and proposed that alternative statutes for the international be drawn up. The conference ultimately resolved to establish a separate syndicalist international, but the CGTU's official position on the matter had not yet been decided. The French delegates themselves declared their intention to support the establishment of a syndicalist international at their inaugural congress.

== Establishment ==
By the time of the Berlin syndicalist conference, the libertarian leadership of the CGTU was already being challenged by a growing communist faction, led by Pierre Monatte, which had recovered from its disorientation and prepared to take over the CGTU. As the RILU had so far only managed to secure the affiliation of small, minor unions, it focused its recruiting efforts on the CGTU, despite its concerns about the strong libertarian and anti-statist influence over the organisation. The Bolsheviks directed the French Communist Party (PCF) to rally support for the RILU within the CGTU by infiltrating its trade unions, attacking the libertarians in their publications and forming alliances with other pro-communist factions. Communists denounced the libertarians for taking over the leadership of the CSR, for their role in the Berlin conference and for their withdrawal of support for the Russian Revolution. Maurice Chambelland accused the delegates to the Berlin conference of exceeding their mandate and deliberately sabotaging the affiliation with the RILU.

At the St. Etienne congress of the CGTU, RILU general secretary Solomon Lozovsky promised the organisation that affiliation between it and the PCF would not be mandatory and that its autonomy would be respected by the RILU. Two resolutions on international affiliation were put before the congress, one by the libertarian Pierre Besnard and the other by the communist Gaston Monmousseau: the former called for the creation of an independent trade union international, without any links to the Communist International; the latter advocated for the CGTU to affiliate with the RILU, provided its autonomy would be respected and no reciprocal representation required. With the support of the pro-communist faction, Monmousseau's motion was carried and the new political bureau of the CGTU was brought under the control of the Vie Ouvrière group, with the PCF declaring it a "brilliant victory for the party". Although the RILU agreed to drop the condition of "reciprocal representation" between the RILU and the CI, it insisted that communist parties would take a "leading role" in the unions affiliated with the RILU. Nevertheless, the leadership of the CGTU agreed to these terms and finalised its affiliation with the RILU.

The libertarian minority subsequently formed the Syndicalist Defense Committee (French: Comité de Défense Syndicaliste; CDS), which acted as an internal opposition within the CGTU, aiming to reassert libertarian control over the union. The CDS called for the complete independence of trade unions from political parties and expressed support for the establishment of a syndicalist international. The bureau of the RILU expressed hope that, in the interest of unity, the CDS would change its mind. Although RILU general secretary Solomon Lozovsky publicly disregarded the CDS as an unimportant splinter group, in his private correspondence with Pierre Monatte, he called for the organisation to be destroyed "with fixed bayonets" and insisted that each issue of La Vie Ouvrière and L'Humanité carry hit pieces against it.

== International relations ==
The CDS quickly established relations with other syndicalist organisations throughout Europe, including in Germany, Italy, Spain and Sweden. In December 1922, delegates of the CDS, representing 100,000 workers, participated in the founding congress of the International Workers' Association (IWA). Representing the CDS were Pierre Besnard and Albert Lemoine, who were given consultative votes.

While the majority of delegates present were ready to establish a syndicalist international, Besnard and Lemoine were reluctant to endorse this. Unlike the other organisations represented, the CDS was not an autonomous organisation; as an organised minority within the CGTU, it hoped to regain influence in the organisation rather than break off. Although they distrusted that the amendments to the RILU statutes had significantly changed its relationship with the CI, they requested that the assembly negotiate further with the RILU and proposed that any new syndicalist international work towards a united front with revolutionary unions affiliated with the RILU. Lemoine's proposal for further negotiations was met with widespread opposition from the conference.

Ultimately, the resolution to establish an independent syndicalist international was passed unanimously, with the qualified support of the CDS. Besnard stated that while the CDS "attached itself morally" to the new international, it did so on the condition that the international seek a united front with all revolutionary organisations, including those not affiliated with it. The CDS delegates also proposed that the new secretariat of the IWA make one last attempt to come to an agreement with the RILU, and if the RILU rejected conciliation, that they then approach the RILU's affiliate unions. This proposal was vocally opposed by delegates from the Argentine Regional Workers' Federation (FORA), which urged the CDS to stop seeking a diplomatic solution to the break with the RILU, which they believed would only undermine the syndicalist movement. Despite the FORA's opposition, most delegates at the congress sympathised with the position of the CDS and endorsed the proposal. The following month, the IWA reached out to the RILU to coordinate action against the occupation of the Ruhr. When the RILU Executive failed to respond, the IWA Bureau declared that the RILU had "automatically rejected" the CDS resolution for a diplomatic solution.

== Conflict with the CGTU leadership ==
As the question of affiliation with either the RILU or IWA was raised, the CGTU entered into a protracted internal dispute over the issue. As the CDS advocated staunchly for working class unity and wanted to avoid another split in the labour movement, it requested that its members remain in the CGTU, despite disagreements on international affiliation. After Gaston Monmousseau had taken over the leadership of the CGTU, the French Communist Party had consolidated control over the organisation, which presented a challenge to attempts by the CDS to negotiate a solution. The PCF tightened relations between it and the CGTU, sought to exclude libertarians from union official positions and took over its publications. In May 1923, the CDS publicly condemned the consolidation of power by the PCF; the CDS was supported by the construction workers' union of the CGTU, which likewise rejected the PCF's entryist tactics. The conflict between the communists and the libertarians came to a head at the CGTU's congress in Bourges, in November 1923.

At the congress, the anarcho-syndicalist Marie Guillot spoke out against the communist takeover, which she said had subverted internal democracy and purged union members not aligned with the party. Pierre Besnard complained that the minority had been sidelined into mere dues-paying members, without decision-making power. He put forward a resolution that declared syndicalism to be a revolutionary movement to abolition both capitalism and the state, and which called for the CGTU to remain autonomous of political parties. But the CGTU majority rebuffed the minority's overtures, insisting that union autonomy was a counterrevolutionary proposal and dismissing the CDS leadership as "enemies of the working class". The majority passed a resolution that sanctioned collaboration between the PCF and CGTU, and revoked the minority's freedom of expression by denying them the right to speak at union assemblies. An appeal from the IWA, passed on by Besnard, for the CGTU to reject communist party control, but it was unsuccessful in eliciting further support. The Bourges congress ultimately proved to be a victory for the communist faction; although the CDS criticised the decisions of the congress, it nevertheless affirmed its allegiance to the CGTU, maintaining its desire to preserve working class unity.

In December 1923, the first IWA conference in Innsbruck criticised the CDS for its conciliatory approach towards the communists, which it considered indecisive and lacking in "ideological clarity". Over the following year, the libertarian minority began to align with the view of their international counterparts and came to consider their desire for working class unity to be untenable. On 11 January 1924, communists murdered two libertarian members of the CGTU in Paris. The CGTU leadership refused to censure the communists for the murders, while the RILU alleged that the CDS itself had been responsible, despite an internal inquiry finding that the murderer had been a member of the PCF. The murders caused a further breakdown in relations between the libertarian minority and the communist majority, which respectively attacked each other in communications and attempted to seize control of each other's organisational structures. The minority called a conference to decide how to respond: either they reunite with the CGT, despite its turn towards reformism; they join with other independent unions that remained outside of both the CGT and CGTU, despite their lack of organisational cohesion; or they found their own organisation, which Besnard proposed would be a "third CGT". Before the conference had a chance to be held, the construction workers' union of the Seine broke away from the CGTU.

== Split ==
In November 1924, the minority syndicalist conference was held, bringing together CGTU dissidents and representatives of independent trade unions. They established the Federative Union of Autonomous Trade Unions (French: Union Fédérative des Syndicats Autonomes; UFSA), which they intended to be a provisional organisation to link together unions outside of the CGT and CGTU. Besnard hoped that the UFSA would encourage defections from disillusioned members of both organisations, which in turn could compel their leaderships to reunite the syndicalist movement around anti-political principles. However, neither the CGTU nor the CGT lost a substantial number of members, while the UFSA itself steadily declined in influence.

By 1926, the collapse of the UFSA had prompted its leading members to reassess their strategy. They began publishing the monthly periodical La Voix du Travail, which provided them a means to propagate their views and regroup their forces. The UFSA leadership no longer considered working class unity in France to be a possibility, as their opponents had already broken working class unity in order to consolidate their own power. They also considered the informal structure of the UFSA to have been a reason for its downfall, as it had hindered the united action required of a trade union federation.

To solve the minority syndicalists' organisational crisis, Lucien Huart called for the creation of a third national trade union centre. In November 1926, at a congress in Lyon, the Revolutionary Syndicalist General Confederation of Labour (French: Confédération Générale du Travail-Syndicaliste Révolutionnaire; CGT-SR) was established, bringing together eighty independent unions. The CGTU became the IWA's French affiliate.

== Bibliography ==
- Damier, Vadim (2009) [2000]. Anarcho-syndicalism in the 20th Century. Translated by Archibald, Malcolm. Edmonton: Black Cat Press. ISBN 978-0-9737827-6-9.
- Garner, Jason (2006). "Separated by an 'Ideological Chasm': The Spanish National Labour Confederation and Bolshevik Internationalism, 1917–1922". Contemporary European History. 15 (3): 293–326. doi:10.1017/S0960777306003341.
- Jakopovich, Dan (2007). "Revolutionary Unionism: Yesterday, Today, Tomorrow". New Politics. 11 (3): 60–66. ISSN 0028-6494.
- Rocker, Rudolf (1988) [1949]. Anarchism and Anarcho-Syndicalism. Freedom Press. ISBN 9780900384455. OCLC 26127983.
- Thorpe, Wayne (1989). The Workers Themselves. Kluwer Academic Publishers. ISBN 0-7923-0276-1. LCCN 89-8205.
- Tosstorff, Reiner (2004). "From the First to the Second Congress of the RILU". The Red International of Labour Unions (RILU) 1920 - 1937. Brill. pp. 422–608. doi:10.1163/9789004325579_007. ISBN 9789004325579.
