= Marcel Voisin =

French grocer and anarchist (1892–1981)

- Born: Marcel Lidoive Voisin; 23 September 1892; Tours
- Died: 31 January 1981; Vincennes

Marcel Voisin (1892–1981) was a French grocer and anarchist.

== Life ==
Born in Tours on 26 September 1892 to a seamstress and shoemaker, Voisin left school to apprentice as a butcher, court clerk, a car painter, and an itinerant worker. After hearing Sébastien Faure speak, he joined him in La Ruche, where he worked as a handyman between 1912 and 1915. He later kept the shop for Faure's periodical, Ce qu’il faut dire. Voisin also supported Louis Lecoin.

In the postwar period through 1971, he managed a general food store. He spent the rest of his life traveling, writing poems, and writing his memoirs, despite being nearly blind. He remained a pacifist and anarchist through the end of his life. He died in Paris on 31 January 1981.
