= International Workers' Association =

International Workers' Association may refer to:

- International Workingmen's Association, the First International, an international organization of left-wing groups and trade unions, active 1864–1876
- International Workers' Association – Asociación Internacional de los Trabajadores (IWA–AIT), an international federation of anarcho-syndicalist trade unions, founded in 1922
