= La Ruche (school) =

French school

La Ruche ("The Hive") was a French school founded by Sébastien Faure on anarchist principles. It operated from 1904 to February 1917.

== History ==
The anarchist Sébastien Faure founded La Ruche on 20 hectares of leased farmland in Le Pâtis, near Rambouillet, on the outskirts of Paris in 1904. The land was both the grounds for his alternative, experimental school and an anarchist commune. The school's name, La Ruche, or "The Hive", comes from the land's resource of honey, which the school used as supplementary income. Faure also funded the school through his lectures and books. He established a cooperative to buy and market the farm's produce. La Ruche operated as a soviet, following the will of the staff's weekly general assembly. The colony persisted until February 1917, when it closed under Faure's financial deficits.

=== Sexual predation ===
It was revealed in 2021 that Faure had been accused in January 1918 of sexually assaulting young girls at La Ruche in a letter written by the anarchist Second Casteu, who relayed testimony from his daughter-in-law Marguerite, who had lived at La Ruche from November 1913 to its closure in February 1917. She alleged that Faure "took little ones into his bed at night and taught them obscene caresses", and believed that "this had been going on since the foundation of la Ruche", based on what she had been told by young girls at La Ruche. This was during Faure's trial for sexually assaulting young girls in a Parisian flea market in September 1917, with this testimony being uncovered as part of larger revelations of his pedophilia.

== Program ==
The school followed a program modeled on that of anarchist pedagogue Paul Robin. About 50 children between the ages of 5 and 16 attended the school, selected from an applicant pool. Children of politically repressed families were given special consideration, such as those of Émile Henry. Ideologically, Faure did not impose his anarchist beliefs on the children, but afforded the children full autonomy—they were not coerced into a specific course of study. La Ruche offered Esperanto lessons through the age of 10, when children were put into pre-apprenticeships that rotated between workshops multiple times per month. They began formal apprenticeships with a wage at the age of 13, whereupon they produced goods for the school. La Ruche used Paul Robin's approach to sex education and mixed-gender classes.

Teachers were unpaid. A common fund provided for their needs and lodging. There were no checks on the disbursement of the fund and there are no records of the arrangement being an issue.

== Legacy ==
Following La Ruche's closure, Faure's disciple Aristide Lapeyre established the Elan school of Villeneuve-sur-Lot, which persisted from the 1930s through World War II.

== See also ==
- Julia Bertrand, a teacher at the school
- Marcel Voisin, a handyman at the school

== Bibliography ==
- Fremion, Yves (2002). The Orgasms of History: 3000 Years of Spontaneous Insurrection. Translated by Sharley, Paul. AK Press. ISBN 978-1-902593-34-0.
