= Julia Bertrand =

French teacher, anarchist, and feminist

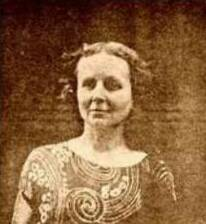
- Born: 14 February 1877; Gemaingoutte
- Died: 25 March 1960; Fontenay-aux-Roses

Julia Bertrand (1877–1960) was a French teacher, anarchist, and feminist.

== Life ==
Born in Gemaingoutte on 14 February 1877, Julia Bertrand taught through the early 1900s. She participated in the founding of the national teachers' union (Fédération nationale des syndicats d’instituteurs, FNSI). Bertrand wrote for the short-lived socialist and feminist journal La Femme enfranchie and the anarchist journal La Vrille. She participated in a number of pacifist, feminist, and anarchist actions, and taught at Sebastien Faure's La Ruche school. Bertrand died in Fontenay-aux-Roses on 25 March 1960.

== External link ==
- Biography on the International Dictionary of Militant Anarchists (in French)
