= Le Fanzinarium =

- Founded: September 2019
- Headquarters location: 48 rue des Vignoles, Paris
- Fiction genres: Zines
- Official website: www.fanzinarium.fr

Le Fanzinarium (English: The Fanzinarium) is a community-run library located at 48 rue des Vignoles, in the 20th arrondissement of Paris.

Founded in 2019 by the association Utopie documentaire du fanzine, it offers over 6,000 fanzines for on-site consultation.

== History ==
=== Fanzine culture and art ===
Fanzine culture and art emerged in the 1930s, initially with science fiction and fantasy publications. However, throughout its history, it has gradually evolved into a means of communication and expression for several often-interlinked cultures, such as the punk, anarchist, vegan, feminist, and queer movements. It is therefore a vital medium of expression for these various countercultures, attracting enthusiasts who wish to preserve this cultural heritage and promote its reach.

=== Fanzinarium ===
Le Fanzinarium opened in September 2019 at the initiative of the Utopie documentaire du fanzine association, on the site of a former cobbler's shop. It is located at 48 rue des Vignoles, in a neighborhood deeply connected to both the history of French fanzines and social activism. For instance, it sits just 120 meters from the headquarters of the Confédération nationale du Travail (CNT), France's primary anarcho-syndicalist organization.

The space is managed by a small team of volunteers. As of 2023–2024, the library held over 6,000 fanzines available for visitors to browse.

Pablo Porlan Pineda describes the library as 'favoring a solidarity-based approach, where publications are offered at affordable prices, or even for free or 'pay-what-you-can'. According to the volunteers, the goal behind this initiative is both to share and archive existing fanzines and to inspire new people to start their own.
