= Confédération nationale du travail =

French trade union confederation

National Confederation of Labour
- Confédération nationale du travail
- Sabo-tabby, the logo of the CNT-F
- Abbreviation: CNT
- Named after: Confederación Nacional del Trabajo
- Predecessor: Revolutionary Syndicalist General Confederation of Labour
- Formation: December 1946; 79 years ago
- Type: National trade union centre
- Headquarters: 33 rue des Vignoles, 20th arrondissement of Paris
- Location: France
- Members: 1,500 (2010)
- Publication: Le Combat Syndicaliste
- Affiliations: International Workers' Association (until 1995)
- Website: cnt-f.org

The National Confederation of Labour (French: Confédération nationale du travail; CNT) is a French trade union centre. Established in 1946 as an anarcho-syndicalist alternative to the main trade union centre, the General Confederation of Labour (CGT), it brought together tens of thousands of workers around the country. After the establishment of another trade union centre, Workers' Force (FO), it sought to collaborate with other autonomous trade unions, with the intention of forming a larger confederation. Over time, many of its members began to withdraw from the organisation and join the FO, which caused division between the CNT and its erstwhile allies. Its political sectarianism during this period provoked most of its members to leave the organisation, either joining the FO or other autonomous unions. By the 1970s, the CNT's membership had declined to less than 100 members and other anarcho-syndicalist initiatives attracted focus from rank-and-file trade union members.

During the 1980s, a renewed interest in anarcho-syndicalism led to the CNT experiencing a resurgence in activity, culminating in its participation in the 1995 strikes in France and the launch of the anarchist demonstration of 1 May in Paris. At this time, it also experienced a split over the issue of participation in works councils. The majority of the organisation supported participation and became known as the CNT-F, while the minority that opposed participation broke off and became the CNT-AIT. Over time, the CNT-F grew to count thousands of members and pursued a strategy of dual unionism. It also formed links with other syndicalist unions in Europe and several autonomous unions in Africa. Although it had the official recognition of the International Workers' Association (AIT), the CNT-AIT remained a marginal organisation, with less than 100 members.

== History ==
=== Background ===
The roots of anarcho-syndicalism in France can be traced back to the General Confederation of Labour (CGT), a national trade union centre founded in the 1890s. Although it initially had a strong anarchist influence, by the outbreak of World War I, the CGT drifted towards reformism and supported the Sacred Union, in collaboration with the government of France during the war. Revolutionary socialists split off from the CGT, forming the Unitary General Confederation of Labour (CGTU), although this quickly fell to infighting between its communist and syndicalist factions. Before long, the CGTU was taken over by the French Communist Party (PCF). In 1926, anarcho-syndicalists split off from the CGTU and established the Revolutionary Syndicalist General Confederation of Labour (CGT-SR), which lasted until the outbreak of World War II in 1939.

=== Establishment ===
Following the liberation of France, in March 1945, anarcho-syndicalists resumed their activities and returned to publishing their periodicals. That year, Le Combat Syndicaliste, the newspaper of the defunct CGT-SR, resumed publication. As discussions about the founding of a new national trade union confederation took place, Pierre Besnard, the leading figure within the CGT-SR, advised against the establishment of another separate confederation and instead encouraged anarcho-syndicalists to join the CGT.

In May 1946, French anarcho-syndicalists came together and established the National Confederation of Labour (French: Confédération nationale du travail; CNT), which held its founding congress in December 1946. Inspired by Pierre Besnard's anarcho-syndicalist theories, the CNT intended to prefigure a future post-capitalist society. After its creation, Besnard reluctantly gave the new organisation his blessing and it was constituted as the official successor of the CGT-SR. In April 1947, Le Combat Syndicaliste became the official publication of the new CNT. The organisation also affiliated itself with the International Workers' Association (AIT).

=== Early activities ===
The CNT quickly attracted several thousand members into its ranks. For a brief time, the CNT united tens of thousands of workers from throughout France, mostly concentrated in the cities of Bordeaux, Marseille, Paris and Toulouse. The CNT was closely connected with the Anarchist Federation (FA), which through its publication Le Libertaire, regularly published works by CNT members such as the metalworker Maurice Joyeux and the publishing worker Jean Boucher.

When the Workers' Force (FO) was established in December 1957, the FA immediately saw the new trade union centre as a threat to the nascent CNT. It called its supporters to abandon both the CGT and FO and for revolutionary syndicalists in autonomous unions to affiliate to the CNT. This turn towards the autonomous unions came too late, as many unions of the Syndicalist Action Committees (CAS) were already negotiating with the FO. Metalworkers of the CAS attempted to negotiate with the CNT but the talks fell through, as the CAS refused to merge into the CNT and the CNT refused to merge into the FO. The CAS metalworkers ultimately opted to remain autonomous, outside the influence of both the FO and CNT. Attempts by the CNT and FA to stem defections to the FO failed, with several anarcho-syndicalists joining the FO. In Maine-et-Loire, the local CNT secretary Gabriel Tharreau held negotiations between the CNT and FO to establish a joint organisation. In private correspondence, some members of the FA began to predict the collapse of the CNT.

After the FO's establishment was finalised, Joyeux changed strategy and proposed a merger between the CNT, the CAS metalworkers and the revolutionary minority of the FO. He hoped that together they could form a trade union confederation that was independent of political parties and capable of providing an alternative to both the CGT and the FO. In September 1948, the CNT's conference approved this new strategy, as did the subsequent FA congress.

On 19–20 November 1948, the CNT, CAS and revolutionary minorities of the CGT and FO attended a National Conference of Autonomous Unions, held on Rue Scribe in the 9th arrondissement of Paris. The CNT was represented by Joyeux and Edouard Rotot. After two days of confused discussion, the Trotskyist delegates won out over the anarchists, resulting in the establishment of a United Syndicalist Action Cartel (French: Cartel d’unité d’action syndicaliste; CUAS). Nevertheless, the anarchists welcomed the establishment of the CUAS, which they considered to be a step in the right direction. The CNT participated in the new labour cartels that were established through the country, taking leadership positions in Gironde and Maine-et-Loire, and gaining a particularly strong influence in Aude. Despite the syndicalist unification at the grassroots level, competing tendencies in the national leadership threatened the continuation of the CUAS.

=== Decline ===
By the late-1940s, the CNT was already facing difficulties, as many of its activists left the organisation. As its membership numbers fell, the organisation became more isolated and began to reconsider remaining in the CUAS. After the CNT's Maine-et-Loire departmental union merged into the FO, on 29 May 1949, the CNT's national committee announced its withdrawal from the CUAS, fearing that it had "put the vitality and unity of our organisation in serious danger". This caused a rupture with its regional unions in Bordeaux and Toulouse, as well as in its railworkers' industrial federation; Joyeux withdrew from the organisation over the decision, lamenting that syndicalist "clannishness" had limited the activities of the CUAS.

The Bordeaux and Toulouse regional unions, and the railworkers' federation, all opted to affiliate themselves with the CUAS. The Secretary for the Bordeaux regional union threatened to withhold its union dues, calling on the CNT to stop its "pettiness and internecine quarrels" and rejoin the CUAS. Fernand Robert, the secretary of the railworkers' federation, denounced the CNT for political sectarianism, which he considered to be a greater threat to syndicalism than the reformist unions; Robert in turn was accused of reformism by the CNT. From 30 October to 1 November 1949, the CNT held an extraordinary congress, which confirmed its decision to split from the CUAS and ordered dissident sections to withdraw from the cartels. While the Bordeaux regional union complied, the railworkers' federation remained in the CUAS. At the second conference of the CUAS, held on 12–13 November 1949, the CNT delegated two of its members to oppose the formation of any new confederation. Despite attempts to consolidate the syndicalist unification process, persistent sectarian tendencies caused the eventual break up of the cartels.

After the breakup of the CUAS, the CNT faced an internal sectarian crisis. On 29 January 1950, the railworkers' secretariat was excluded from the central committee due to its support for the CUAS, causing the railworkers' federation to collapse. Membership numbers also collapsed in Bordeaux, Saint-Etienne and Toulouse, as many members left for other unions. The CNT and FA were also driven apart, as the FA stopped publishing the CNT's addresses in Le Libertaire, while many leading CNT members left and joined the FA.

Many in the French anarchist movement now saw anarcho-syndicalism as a divisive force in the labour movement. The FA itself believed it important to participate in trade unions, but no longer prioritised independent anarcho-syndicalist organisation. The majority of the CNT's members soon left to join the larger, more moderate trade unions, mainly joining the FO or other autonomous trade unions. Even leading figures like Jean Boucher, Maurice Joyeux and Fernand Robert joined the FO, which they saw as the only viable trade union centre. The CNT refocused its efforts on small-scale trade union initiatives. By the 1970s, the CNT had less than 100 members. The CNT itself remained only a marginal force within the small French anarchist movement.

=== Other syndicalist initiatives ===
As the CNT declined, a number of other anarcho-syndicalist organisations formed alongside it. The FA established the Anarchist-Syndicalist Union (UAS), which counted between 100 and 150 members, themselves organised within the CGT and FO. In 1970, the Syndicalist Alliance (AS) was established by rank-and-file members of the French Democratic Confederation of Labour (CFDT), who opposed trade union bureaucracy and concerned themselves with supporting trade union welfare; by the mid-1970s, it had grown to 50 local groups and its publication had a circulation of 3,000 copies. In 1978, French anarcho-syndicalist workers were establishing their own unions, notably including Self-Managed Workers' Union (SAT), which organised postal workers in Lyon.

During the 1980s, widespread disillusionment with the socialist government of François Mitterrand, combined with a wave of strike actions, renewed interest in anarcho-syndicalism and autonomous trade unionism. In 1989, the Democratic United Solidarity Union (SUD) was established by workers that had been suspended from the CFDT. The SUD took up a revolutionary syndicalist platform, organised itself according to a federal structure, practiced workers' self-management and maintained its independence from political parties.

=== Revival and split ===
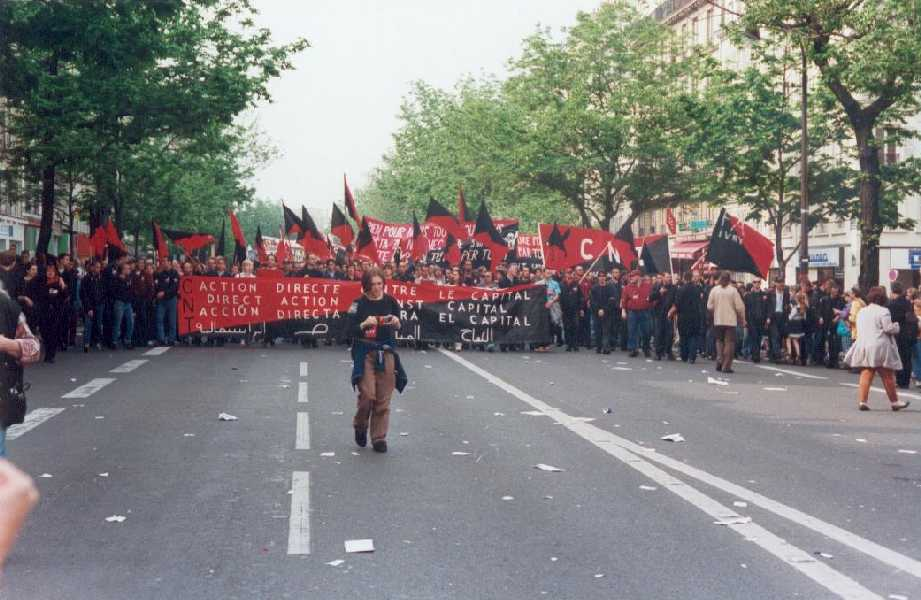
CNT-F demonstration in Paris on International Workers' Day (2000)

As anarcho-syndicalism experienced a revival during the 1980s, the CNT also underwent a resurgence. By 1993, it counted hundreds of members and continued to grow, culminating with its participation in the 1995 French general strikes. In 1994, it launched the anarchist demonstration of 1 May in Paris. During the mid-1990s, approximately 11% of the French anarchist movement was organised within the CNT.

But by this time, the organisation split over the issue of participation in elections to works councils. The majority two-thirds of the organisation approved of participation; they became known as the CNT-Vignolles (CNT-F), which took over the organisation's headquarters at 33 rue des Vignoles in Paris. The minority, which opposed participation, broke off and became the CNT-AIT, which received official recognition of the International Workers' Association. Both factions had periodicals by the same name, Le Combat Syndicaliste, although the CNT-AIT later changed the name of their publication to Anarchosyndicalisme!

== Post-split ==
Since the split, both CNTs have continued to carry out their activism separately. By the late 1990s, roughly 1,000 members could be counted between them. The split carried on into the 21st century, sometimes marked by open conflict between the two organisations, with only occasional expressions of desire for reunification. Calls have since been made for the CNT organisations to come together with other organisations, in order to unify the French anarchist movement.

=== CNT-F ===
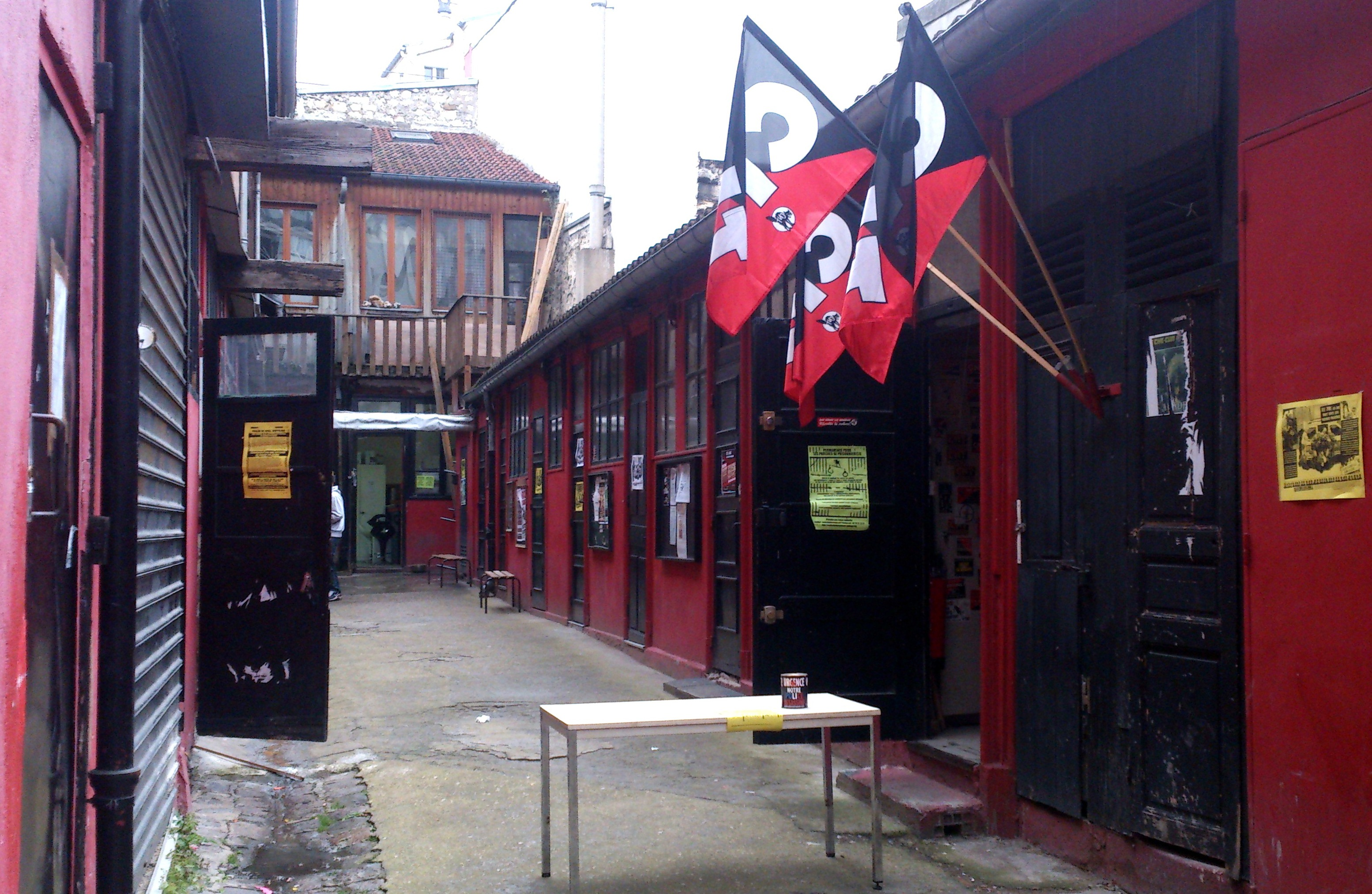
CNT-F headquarters on Rue des Vignolles in Paris

In 2011, most of the CNT-F's working membership was organised in the education, health care, postal, social work and telecommunications sectors. In 2005, the organisation counted 200 local unions. No membership figures for the CNT-F have been independently verified, although various different estimates have been given for the 1999-2010 period: in 1999, Mimmo Pucciarelli estimated it to have counted 3,000 members, while its version of Le Combat Syndicaliste printed 2,000 copies for 700 subscribers; in 2003, the CNT-F itself claimed to have 5,000 members; in 2005, an article in Politis estimated it to have 4,000 members; and in 2010, David Porter estimated it to have had at least 1,500 dues-paying members. Around that time, a member of the CNT-F in Lyon expressed concern that the organisation was dominated by white men, which "doesn't truly reflect the composition of our society".

The CNT-F has been chategorised as having an optimist orientation, which allows it to accept having a more tightly coordinated internal structure and collaborating with non-anarchists in broader social movements. The CNT-F expresses an overlapping affinity for both anarcho-syndicalism and neutral syndicalism. The CNT-F has promoted a strategy of dual unionism, in which syndicalists organise their own revolutionary unions while also participating in larger mass unions. It also developed an expression of green syndicalism, synthesising environmentalism with trade union organising. In September 2001, CNT-F activists participated in the destruction of a genetically modified food crop in Avelin.

The CNT-F expressed its wish for the AIT to expand its membership by including trade unions from each continent; failing that, the CNT-F called for the creation of a new, more expansive trade union international. In 2000, it began forming links with African unions, including the SATEF, CLA and SNA-PAP in Algeria. Over the subsequent decade, the CNT-F reported extensively on the autonomous trade union movement in Algeria and organised in support of striking Algerian workers. In 2001, the CNT-F participated in the establishment of International Libertarian Solidarity (SLI), a syndicalist international that also included the Spanish General Confederation of Labour (CGT) and the Central Organisation of Swedish Workers (SAC). In 2007, the CNT-F organised an international syndicalist conference in Paris, which saw attendance by dozens of African unions. The CNT-F has also taken a firm stance in opposition to French colonialism in Kanaky and Guiana, as well as French neo-colonial policy towards Algeria.

=== CNT-AIT ===
The CNT-AIT, which maintained its affiliation with the International Workers' Association, is headquartered in Toulouse. As of 2010, the CNT-AIT counted seven regional unions, and was estimated to have had less than 100 dues-paying members. The CNT-AIT opposes participation in works councils and instead prefers direct action as a means to achieve its objectives. It has also shown sympathies with the post-situationist politics of Jaime Semprum, which have more in common with insurrectionary anarchism than anarcho-syndicalism.

== Bibliography ==
- Correa, Felipe (2023). "The Global Revival of Anarchism and Syndicalism". In van der Linden, Marcel (ed.). The Cambridge History of Socialism. Vol. 1. Cambridge University Press. pp. 621–647. doi:10.1017/9781108611022.027. ISBN 978-1-108-48134-2.
- Damier, Vadim (2009) [2000]. Anarcho-syndicalism in the 20th Century. Translated by Archibald, Malcolm. Edmonton: Black Cat Press. ISBN 978-0-9737827-6-9.
- Davranche, Guillaume (2010). "How and Why the French Anarchists Rallied to the CGT-FO (1947–1950)". In Berry, David; Bantman, Constance (eds.). New Perspectives on Anarchism, Labour and Syndicalism: The Individual, the National and the Transnational. Cambridge Scholars Publishing. pp. 163–179. ISBN 978-1-4438-2393-7.
- Gildea, Robert (1996). "Anarchism". The Past in French History. Yale University Press. pp. 260–299. ISBN 0300067119.
- Hayes, Graeme (2007). "Collective Action and Civil Disobedience: The Anti-GMO Campaign of the Faucheurs Volontaires". French Politics. 5 (4): 293–314. doi:10.1057/palgrave.fp.8200122.
- Porter, David (2011). Eyes to the South: French Anarchists & Algeria. AK Press. ISBN 978-1-84935-076-1.
- Shantz, Jeff (2002). "Green Syndicalism: An Alternative Red-Green Vision". Environmental Politics. 11 (4): 21–41. Bibcode:2002EnvPo..11...21S. doi:10.1080/714000644.
- Thorpe, Wayne (1996). "Anarchosyndicalism in Inter-War France: The Vision of Pierre Besnard". European History Quarterly. 26 (4): 559–590. doi:10.1177/026569149602600403.
- van der Walt, Lucien; Schmidt, Michael (2009). Black Flame: The Revolutionary Class Politics of Anarchism and Syndicalism. Edinburgh: AK Press. ISBN 978-1-904859-16-1. LCCN 2006933558. OCLC 1100238201.
