= 33 rue des Vignoles =

Coordinates: 48.8539°N 2.3996°E

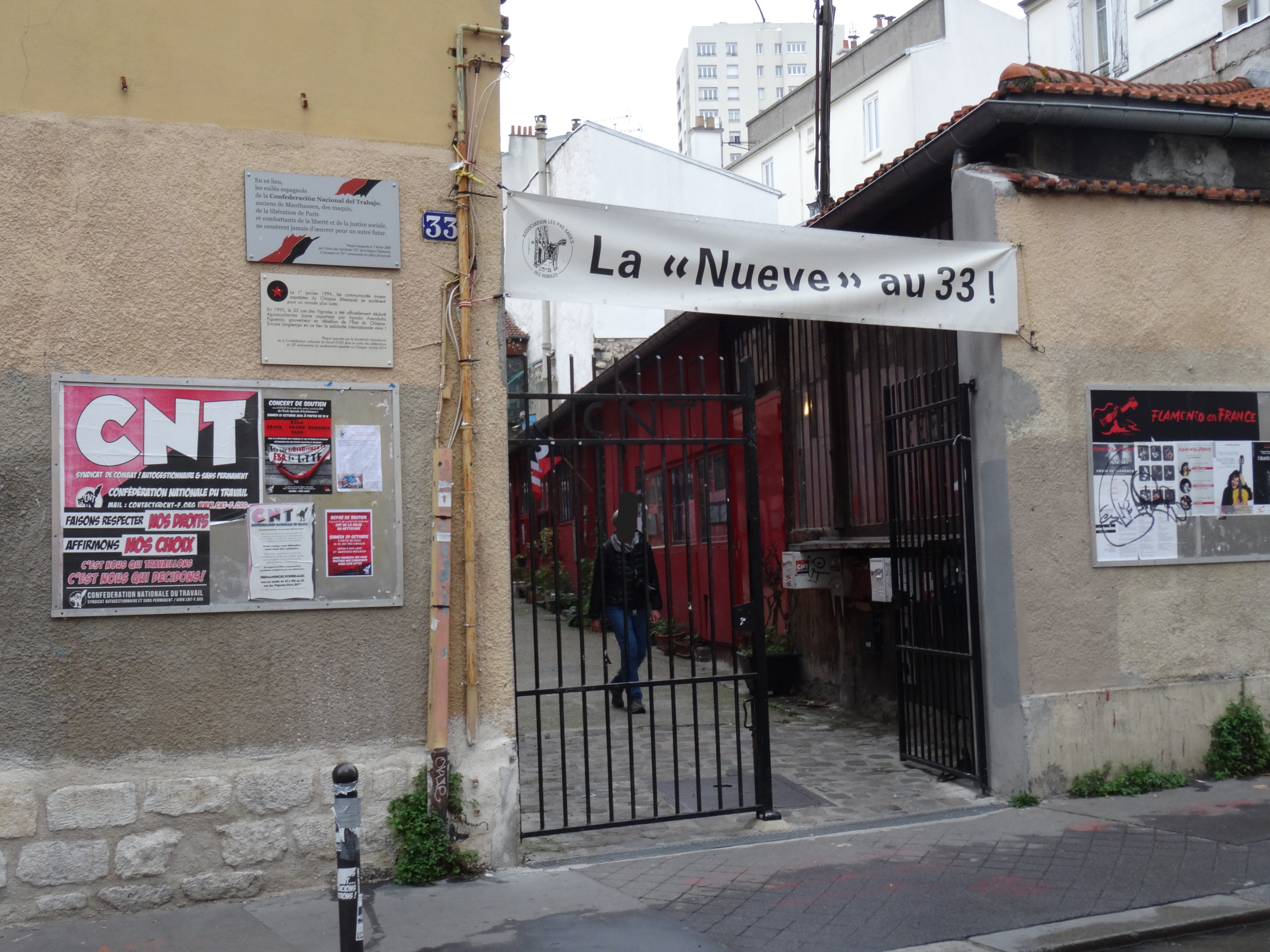
- Entry of the dead-end leading to the 33rd
- Interactive map of the 33 rue des Vignoles area

General information
- Location: Paris, France
- Opened: 1970

Website
- https://www2.cnt-f.org/

33 rue des Vignoles (nicknamed Vignoles or the 33rd) is the building that houses the headquarters of the Confédération nationale du Travail (CNT), the primary anarcho-syndicalist organization in France. It is located in the 20th arrondissement of Paris.

A landmark of Red Paris, it hosts a significant number of cultural and activist activities linked to anarchism or the memory of Spanish anarchists. It has served as a focal point for anarchists in France since the 1970s.

Since 2025, it has been undergoing renovations, with a reopening scheduled for 2026.

== 33 rue des Vignoles ==
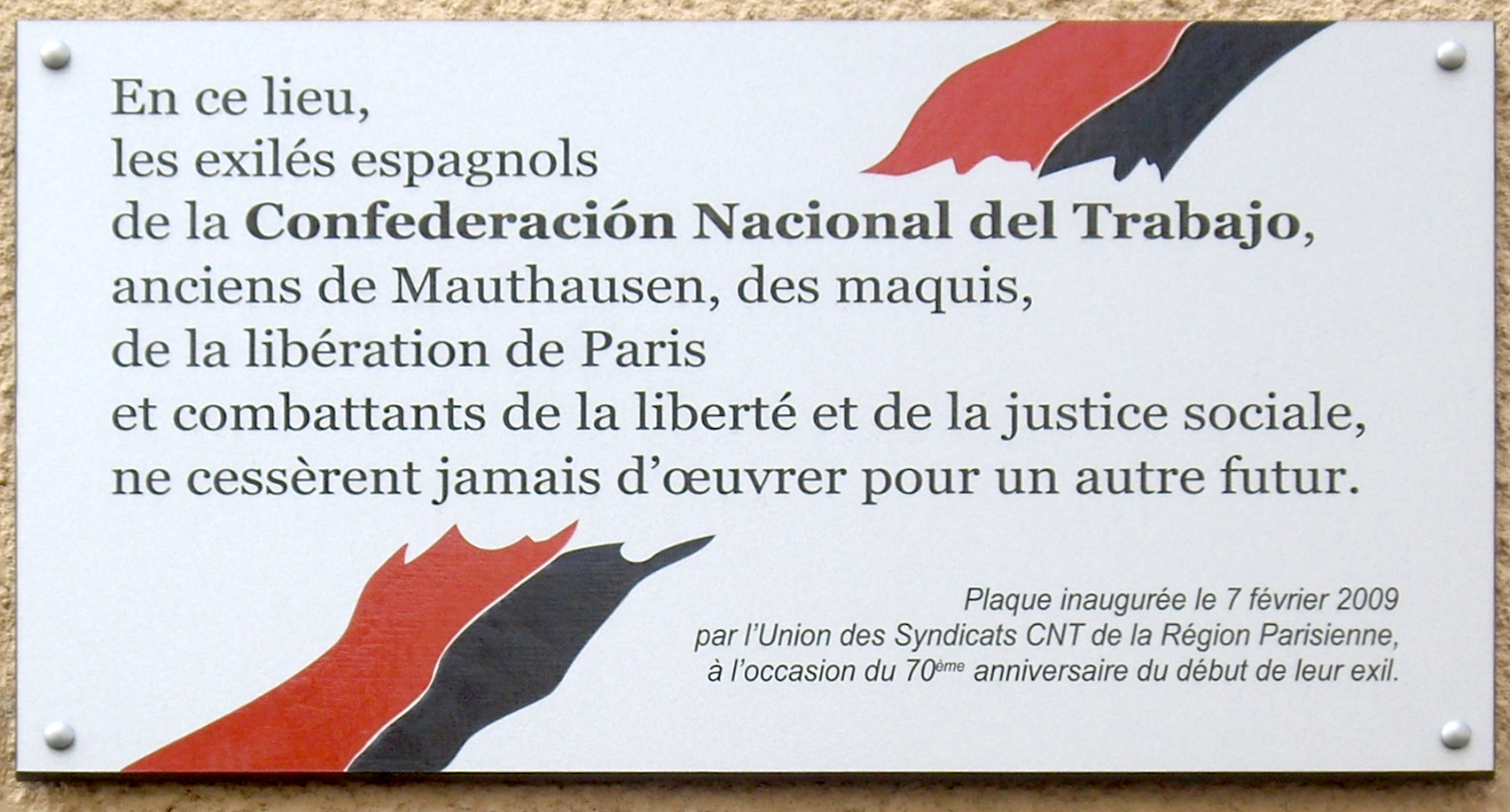
Commemorative plaque by the CNT, the caption reads : 'In this place, the Spanish exiles of the Confederación Nacional del Trabajo, veterans of Mauthausen, the Maquis, and the Liberation of Paris, and fighters for freedom and social justice, never ceased to work for a different future.'

While the French CNT was initially based in a small space on rue Sainte-Marthe, the union began renting these premises, located at the end of a dead-end street, in 1970. It earned the nickname 'the 33rd', among others.

From its founding, the space has been self-managed according to anarchist practices; it quickly became a focal point for anarchists in France. For instance, the offices of the Revolutionary Anarchist Organization (ORA) and other organizations of the 1970s were hosted at 33 rue des Vignoles alongside those of the CNT.

During the 2010s and 2020s, the anarchists and the Flamenco Paris association were threatened with eviction by the Paris City Council if they did not carry out renovations, which they claimed were beyond their means. This crisis led to a mobilization effort that successfully raised funds to restore the premises; the building closed in 2025 with a scheduled reopening in late 2026.

In the meantime, the CNT has moved to 31 bis rue des Trois-Bornes.

== Legacy ==
=== The 33rd as a structuring place for the anarchist movement in France ===
The fact that the CNT hosted the ORA contributed to a transmission of activism, connecting older anarchists from the Spanish Civil War with the anarchists of the ORA, who were part of a young generation emerging from the struggles of May 68. The Argentine anarchist Tomas Rothaus, who visited the premises in 1998, wrote that in his view:

The different generations and strands of anarchism weren't just connected metaphorically, they literally coexisted in this one space, and you could experience them all just by jumping from room to room at different times and days. At one moment in one room, it could be a meeting of the CNT-Nettoyage (cleaning workers' union), formed in 1988 and representing hundreds of workers coming from the most precarious sectors of the proletariat, mainly immigrants, often illegals]'—while in the next room the very classically anarchist and very much autonomous-dominated Collectif Anti-Expulsions could be found plotting the next occupation or mass action directed against the state machinery of deportation or the companies and corporations who collaborated with the state to make detention and deportation of human beings possible. [... The] place was a living lesson in the practical application of multigenerational, diverse (at least, more diverse than elsewhere), and multifaceted anarchism.

=== Sociological influences in Paris ===
According to sociologist Sylvaine Conord, it is a notable site within the networks of Eastern Paris, structuring a whole series of activist and anarchist networks around it. It is thus located near the Fanzinarium, a community-run library dedicated to the culture of the fanzine, and the anarchist bookstore Quilombo.

Streetpress ranks it among the notable sites of the 'alternative left' in Paris, using an illustration of the CNT for its article.
