= Anarchist demonstration of 1 May in Paris =

Annual event

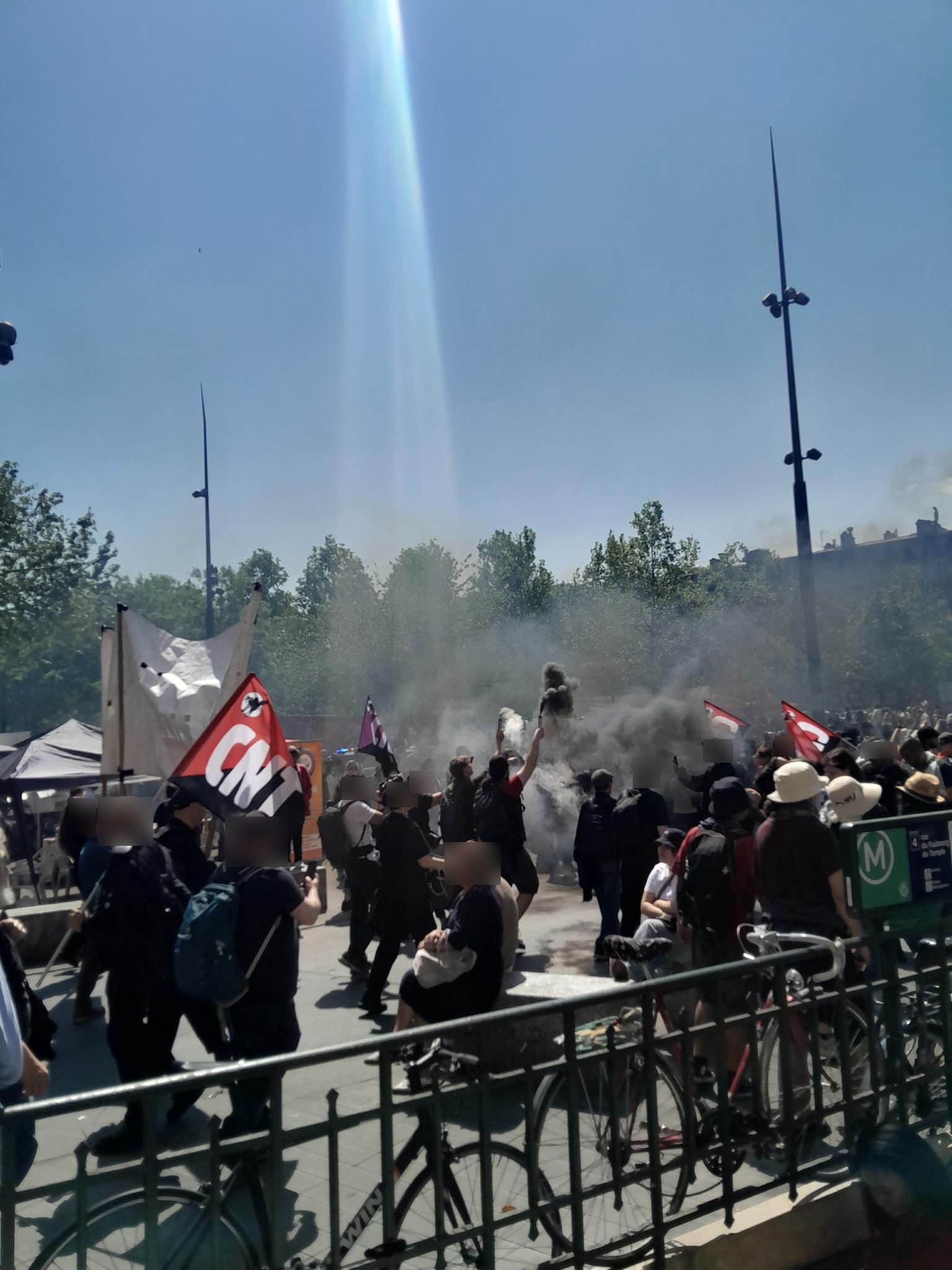
- Anarchist contingent joining the inter-union demonstration (2026)
- Date: 1 May (usually in the late morning)
- Location: Place des Fêtes, Paris, France
- Goals: Anarchist social revolution
- Methods: Protesting, direct action

The anarchist demonstration of 1 May in Paris is an event held annually in the city. Organized by the Confédération nationale du Travail (CNT), the Francophone Anarchist Federation (FA), the Union communiste libertaire (UCL), and other anarchist organizations, it generally follows a route and schedule that allows it to join the main inter-union demonstration held later in the day.

1 May is a pivotal date in the history of the labour movement and anarchist history. It is a day of commemoration honoring the anarchists sentenced to death following the Haymarket massacre (1886). In France, the Clichy affair (1891) further reinforced the importance of this day of mobilization for them. Although they were in favor of the earliest editions, the reformist and moderate nature of the demonstrations controlled by socialists pushed them to become increasingly critical and to seek to reaffirm their revolutionary and anarchist character.

In 1994, the CNT launched the first edition of this specific demonstration, and has been joined by other anarchist organizations since then. It gathers between hundreds and thousands of people depending on the year.

== History ==
=== Context: Haymarket Square massacre and first 1 May demonstrations in France ===
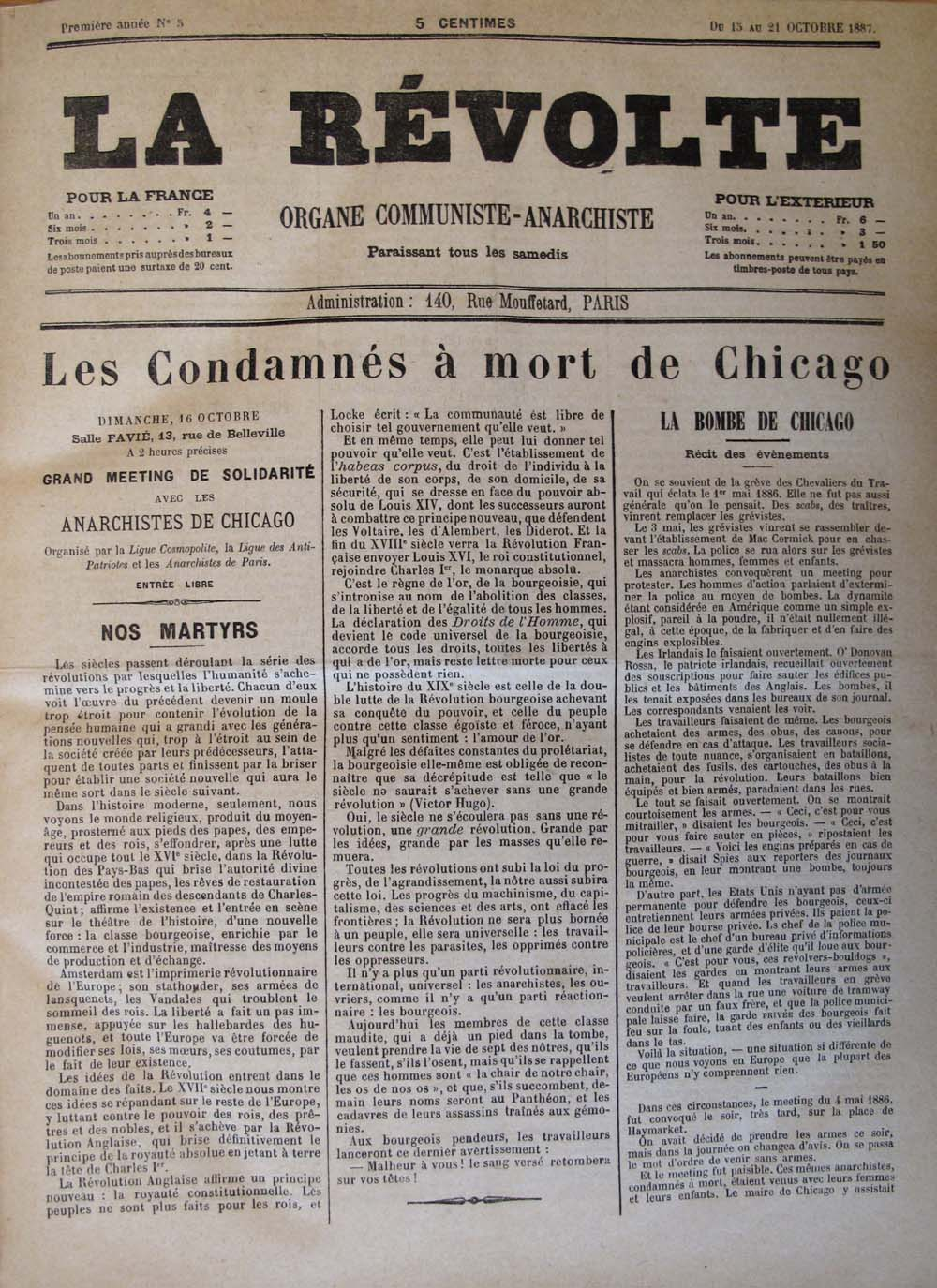
Issue of La Révolte discussing the 'martyrs of Chicago' (21 October 1887)

1 May became International Workers' Day following the Haymarket Square massacre in Chicago in 1886. In France, anarchists were initially very favorable toward the 1 May demonstration, which, in its early editions in the early 1890s, was a very radical and revolutionary day. However, they became increasingly critical of the demonstration led by the socialists as it proved to be less and less radical. Émile Pouget, a figure of the anarchist movement in France at the time, wrote:

In Paris, there’s a whole bunch of good lads mixed with a few nasty old codgers who are on the '1 May Organizing Committee'. Committees are always beside the point, goddammit! Still, it was decided that we wouldn't go for the traditional little stroll to the cake-eaters at the Aquarium, in other words, to the public authorities. It’s been recognized as a load of bollocks to go bringing petitions to those blackbirds, seeing as, quite simply, they wipe their backsides with our bellyaching.

Despite these criticisms, the memory and symbolic power of 1 May remained very strong and important among anarchists, a situation reinforced by the Clichy affair (1891), which left a lasting mark on anarchist culture in France. Consequently, they generally attempted to hold their own demonstration or to radicalize the general demonstration, that is, to return to a situation where the anarchist aspect of this day of mobilization would be more visible, or even central.

=== Contemporary anarchist demonstration ===
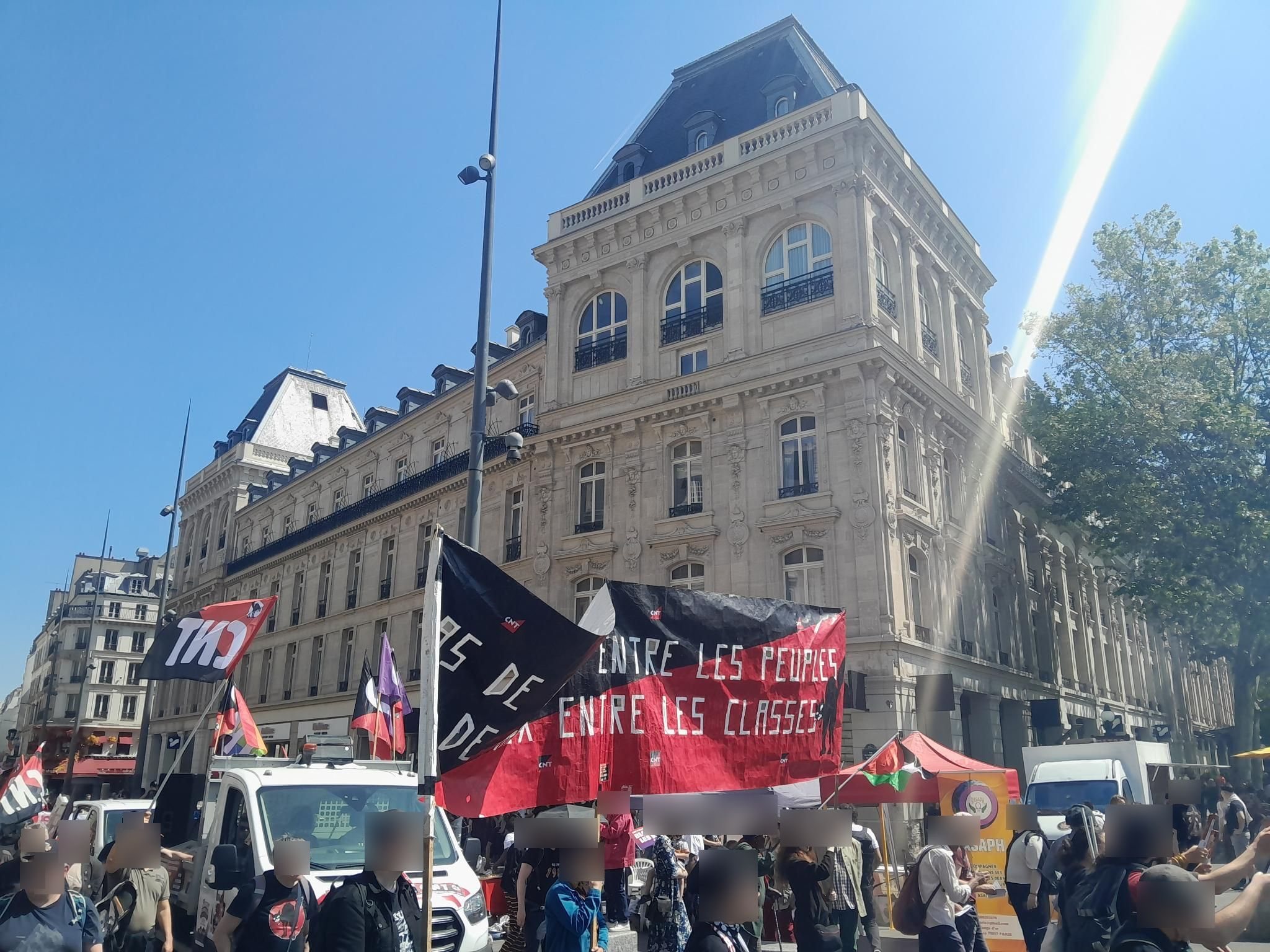
Front of the anarchist demonstration joining the big one at the place de la République (2026) - the banner reads 'No wars between people, no peace between classes'

The contemporary anarchist 1 May demonstration was launched in 1994 by the Confédération nationale du Travail (CNT), the primary anarcho-syndicalist organization in France. Unlike the larger inter-union demonstration, which is generally organized from Place de la République to Place de la Nation, the anarchist march begins in the late morning at Place des Fêtes and heads toward the main demonstration to join it.

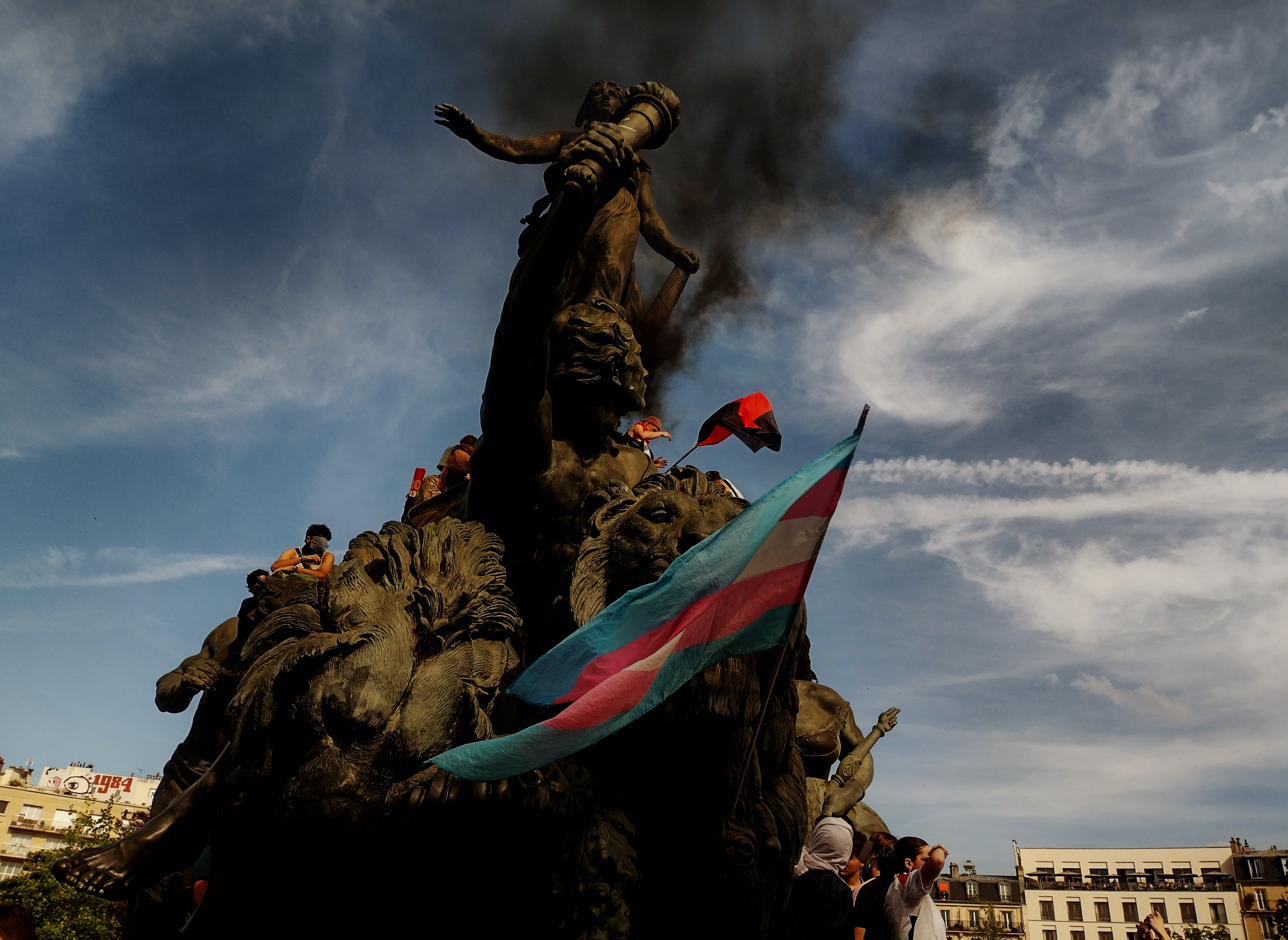
Red and black and trans flags on Le Triomphe de la République in Paris (1st of May 2025).

In 2000, the demonstration gathered a notable crowd of approximately 5,000 people and was led by a brass band of striking British miners.

In 2002, the event took on a distinctively anti-Le Pen character following the first round of the presidential election held just prior.

The following year, they organized both this demonstration and another in November following the same route, but intended to join an anti-globalization procession.

In 2007, police estimates placed the turnout at around 2,000 people.

In 2013, about a thousand companions gathered from several organizations, including the CNT, the Francophone Anarchist Federation (FA) and Alternative Libertaire (AL). They were noted for displaying numerous red and black flags.

In 2017, several hundred people demonstrated against both Marine Le Pen and Emmanuel Macron, chanting anti-capitalist and anti-fascist slogans. Some participants, dressed in black and hooded as a black bloc, joined the tail end of the main procession after the anarchist march.

The 2019 edition took place in a climate of support for the Yellow Vests and climate justice.

== Bibliography ==
- Bouhey, Vivien (2008), Les Anarchistes contre la République [The Anarchists against the Republic], Rennes: Presses universitaires de Rennes (PUR), ISBN 978-2-7535-1359-4
