= Libertarian Syndicalist Union =

Greek trade union confederation

- Ελευθεριακή Συνδικαλιστική Ένωση
- Sabo-tabby, the logo of the ESE
- Abbreviation: ESE
- Formation: October 2003; 22 years ago
- Location: Greece
- Affiliations: International Workers' Association (IWA) (until 2016); International Confederation of Labour (ICL) (since 2018)
- Website: ese.espiv.net

The Libertarian Syndicalist Union (Greek: Ελευθεριακή Συνδικαλιστική Ένωση, romanized: Eleftheriakí Syndikalistikí Énosi; ESE), is a Greek anarcho-syndicalist trade union confederation founded on 5 October 2003. Formerly a member of the International Workers' Association (IWA), it has been a member of the International Confederation of Labour (ICL) since 2018. It is one of the largest anarchist organisations in Greece.

== History ==
The union was founded on 5 October 2003, after a congress that accepted its founding declaration. Initially, it participated in the International Libertarian Solidarity (ILS) while it was ongoing, while maintaining links with the International Workers' Association (IWA). The union is independent of any political party and is organized around local (or professional) assemblies based on the principle of direct democracy. The union proclaims its solidarity with anti-capitalist and anti-fascist struggles.

During the Greek economic crisis, the union was part of the Greek anarchist organisations that were critical of the idea of cooperativising the economy. Additionally, it assisted in the reception of migrants in Greece.

In 2016, it left the IWA along with the Confederación Nacional del Trabajo (CNT), the Argentine Regional Workers' Federation (FORA), and the Italian Syndicalist Union (USI). In 2018, these organisations founded the International Confederation of Labour (ICL), where they reunited. The union has become one of the most active and numerous anarcho-communist and anarcho-syndicalist organisations in Greece.

In 2023, the organisation published a translation of Breaking the Chains: A History of Anarchism by Lucien van der Walt.
