= Sébastien Faure =

French anarcho-communists (1858–1942)

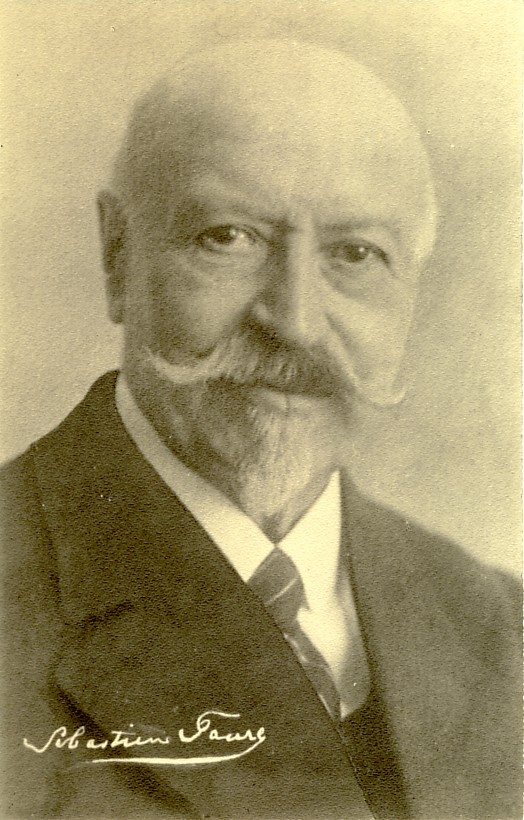
- Born: 6 January 1858; Loire, French Empire
- Died: 14 July 1942 (aged 84); Royan, Charente-Maritime, German-occupied France

Philosophical work
- Era: 19th-/20th-century philosophy
- Region: Western philosophy
- School: Anarcho-communism; Socialism; Anarchist synthesis

Sébastien Faure (French: [foʁ]; 6 January 1858 – 14 July 1942) was a French anarchist, convicted sex offender, freethought and secularist activist and a principal proponent of the anarchist synthesis.

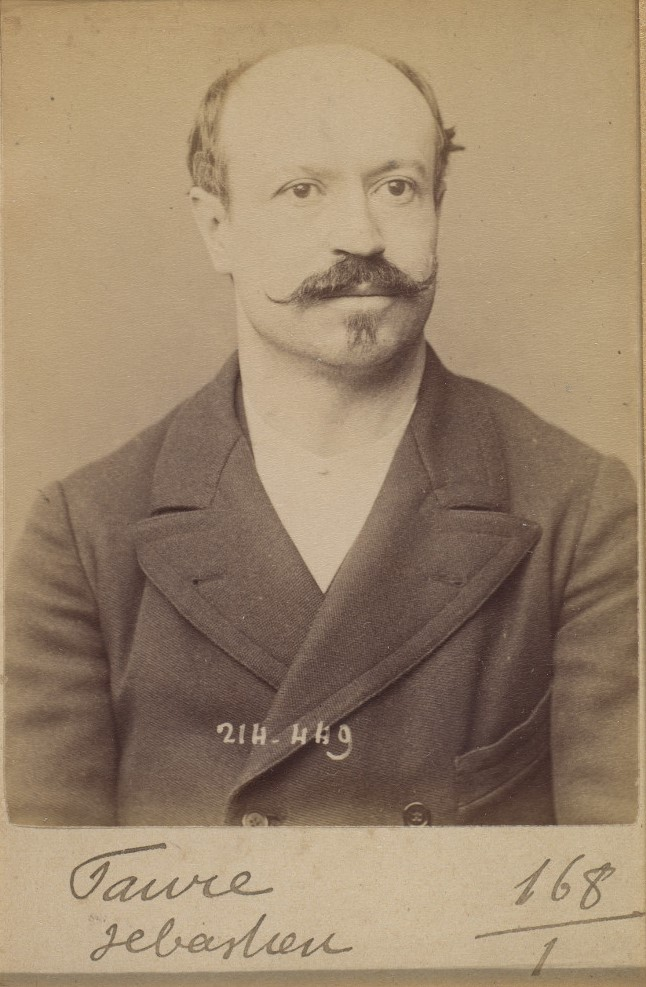
Police photograph of Faure taken before 1918

== Biography ==
Before becoming a free-thinker, Faure was a seminarist. He engaged in politics as a socialist before turning to anarchism in 1888.

In 1894, he was prosecuted in "The Trial of the thirty" ("Procès des trente"), but was acquitted. That same year, he became the guardian of Sidonie Vaillant after the execution of her father, Auguste Vaillant. In 1895, he cofounded "Le Libertaire" with Louise Michel, taking the name of the earlier journal by Joseph Déjacque. At the time of the Dreyfus affair, he was one of the leading supporters of Alfred Dreyfus. In 1904, he created a libertarian school, La Ruche ("The Hive"), close to Rambouillet, which closed in February 1917. In 1916, he launched the periodical "Ce qu'il faut dire". Faure also co-founded (with Volin) the anarchist synthesis, which was an influential form of conceiving anarchist federations.

Faure edited the Encyclopédie anarchiste (Anarchist Encyclopedia), a dictionary of the philosophy and beliefs of anarchism, including its principles and tendencies, with contributions from about 100 others. Compiled between 1925 and 1934, the dictionary was published in installments for distribution by subscription. The final volume was 2,893 pages across four volumes. It was envisioned as the first part of a five-part encyclopedia project covering the biographies, historical events, and bibliography of anarchism, but this went unpublished. Contributors included Émile Armand, Luigi Bertoni, Pierre Besnard, Han Ryner, Augustin Souchy, Max Nettlau, Aristide Lapeyre, and Gérard de Lacaze-Duthiers.

=== Pedophilia ===
On 9 September 1903, Faure was caught molesting three young girls, but released as the parents did not press charges. On 19 November 1907, he was identified as the client of a 14-year old prostitute, but no action was taken.

He was again caught on 28 September 1916 while molesting two young girls, but the police commissioner opted to use the case as blackmail to curb his pacifist activism amidst the First World War. It is also likely that he used his school La Ruche for his sexual predation, where he had taken in 20 to 30 orphaned children throughout its 13 years of operation. During the 1917 case, the anarchist Second Casteu wrote a letter reporting the testimony of his daughter-in-law Marguerite, who had lived at La Ruche, accusing Faure of molesting the children there.

On 23 September 1917 he was caught sexually assaulting young girls in a Parisian flea market. Accused by multiple witnesses in the crowd, he evaded the police and was sentenced to two years of prison time for public indecency. Discovered and arrested in Marseille in January 1918, his sentence was reduced to six months following a retrial. Though he would claim to have been falsely persecuted, he was viewed with suspicion in anarchist circles and avoided political activity until December 1919. The case files for this conviction were not released to the public until 2018, which led to a comprehensive compilation of documents and testimonies published in 2021. This evidence disproved allegations of police manipulation and also revealed previously unknown earlier cases.

On 15 March 1921 he was again arrested along with two accomplices, accused of sexually abusing two girls aged 11 and 12. Through the investigation it was revealed that he was known to local children as "Monsieur Fontaine", and had abused five more victims. He was again convicted of public indecency and sentenced to eight months in prison. He again claimed to have been falsely accused and was able to convince his contemporaries, and subsequent analyses of his life tended to dismiss the charges. After 1921, there are no further documented cases of sexual predation by Faure.

== Bibliography ==
He is recognized for his pedagogy and his qualities as a speaker, and is the author of several books:

- The universal pain (1895)
- My Communism (1921)
- The Forces Of The Revolution (1921)
- Religious imposture (1923)
- Subversive remarks
- Twelve Proofs of God's Inexistence (1908)

He was also the founder of the Anarchist Encyclopedia, as well as the namesake of the Sébastien Faure Century, the French-speaking contingent of the Durruti Column during the civil war in Spain.

== Anarchist Synthesis ==
The discussion about the Anarchist Synthesis arises in the context of the discussion on the Organisational Platform of the Libertarian Communists, written by the Dielo Truda group of Russian exiles in 1926.

Two texts made as responses to the Platform, each proposing a different organizational model, became the basis for what is known as the organisation of synthesis, or simply "synthesism". Volin published in 1924 a paper calling for "the anarchist synthesis" and was also the author of the article in Sébastien Faure's Encyclopedie Anarchiste on the same topic. The main purpose behind the synthesis was that the anarchist movement in most countries was divided into three main tendencies: communist anarchism, anarcho-syndicalism, and individualist anarchism and so such an organization could contain anarchists of these three tendencies very well.

The platformists wanted to push their ideas forward through organizing an international anarchist congress on 12 February 1927. Shortly later in the National Congress of the French Anarchist Union (UAF), the Dielo Truda Group achieved making their platform more popular and so they made the UAF change its name into Revolutionary Anarcho-Communist Union (UACR). Sébastien Faure led a faction within the UACR that decided to separate themselves from this organization and form outside it the Association of Federalist Anarchists (AFA), thinking that traditional anarchist ideas were being threatened by the Dielo Truda platform. Shortly later in his text "Anarchist synthesis" he exposes the view that "these currents were not contradictory but complementary, each having a role within anarchism: anarcho-syndicalism as the strength of the mass organisations and the best way for the practice of anarchism; libertarian communism as a proposed future society based on the distribution of the fruits of labour according to the needs of each one; anarcho-individualism as a negation of oppression and affirming the individual right to development of the individual, seeking to please them in every way." Sebastian Faure had strong contacts in Spain and so his proposal had more impact with Spanish anarchists than the Dielo Truda platform even though individualist anarchist influence in Spain was less strong than it was in France. The main goal there was reconciling anarcho-communism with anarcho-syndicalism.

== Selected works ==
- The Anarchist Synthesis (1927)
- Revolutionary Forces (1921)
- Twelve Proofs of the Inexistence of God

== See also ==
- Anarchism in France
