= Ralph Darlington =

British academic

Ralph Darlington is Professor of Employment Relations at Salford Business School, University of Salford. His research has been featured in national and local newspapers, radio and television. Darlington has published numerous books on his research.

== Early life ==
He obtained a First Class BA (Hons) Social Studies degree from Liverpool Polytechnic in 1987, before completing his MA in Labour Studies and PhD in Industrial Relations from the University of Warwick.

== Academic and research career ==
He joined the University of Salford in 2001.

His research is concerned with the dynamics of trade union organisation, activity and consciousness in Britain and internationally both with a contemporary and within a historical context. He has authored, co-authored and edited six books.

He was appointed as Professor of Employment Relations by Salford in 2008.

== Advisory and consultancy work ==
Since 1992 Darlington has been secretary of the Manchester Industrial Relations Society, the primary forum for academic and practitioner debates in the field of industrial relations in the north of England. Since 2005 he has also been a national executive member of the main professional association within his field, the British Universities' Industrial Relations Association. In addition to acting in an advisory capacity for a number of trade unions, his research has been featured in national and local newspapers, radio and television.
