= Revolutionary Syndicalist Committees =

Trade union of France

The Revolutionary Syndicalist Committees (French: Comités Syndicalistes Révolutionnaires, CSR) were a trade-unionist organization inside the General Confederation of Labour (Confédération Générale du Travail, CGT). The group was founded in opposition to reformist French CGT leadership in the circle around Pierre Monatte and the Vie ouvrière newspaper. They created a coordinating entity after the September 1919 CGT congress and worked to develop inroads with specific member unions, with railroad workers in particular.

Monatte established a CSR Central Committee at a September 1921 opposition congress in Lyon. Revolutionary syndicalists formally separated from the CGT in December. They created a "Unitarian CGT" (CGTU) at the July 1922 Saint-Etienne congress.

== Bibliography ==
- Damier, Vadim (2009) [2000]. Anarcho-syndicalism in the 20th Century. Translated by Archibald, Malcolm. Edmonton: Black Cat Press. ISBN 978-0-9737827-6-9.
- Thorpe, Wayne (1989). The Workers Themselves. Kluwer Academic Publishers. ISBN 0-7923-0276-1. LCCN 89-8205.
