= The Workers Themselves =

1989 book

- Author: Wayne Thorpe
- Subject: History of syndicalism
- Publisher: Kluwer
- Publication date: 1989
- Pages: 352

'The Workers Themselves': Revolutionary Syndicalism and International Labour, 1913–1923 is a 1989 history book written by Wayne Thorpe on the international development of syndicalism.

== Bibliography ==
- Adams, Tony (1991). "Review of 'The Workers Themselves': Revolutionary Syndicalism and International Labour, 1913–1923". The Economic History Review. 44 (1): 197–198. doi:10.2307/2597516. ISSN 0013-0117. JSTOR 2597516.
- Friedman, Gerald (1991). "Review of 'The Workers Themselves': Revolutionary Syndicalism and International Labour, 1913–1923". The Journal of Economic History. 51 (2): 528–529. doi:10.1017/S0022050700039474. ISSN 0022-0507. JSTOR 2122628.
- Jennings, Jeremy (1991). "Review of 'The Workers Themselves': Revolutionary Syndicalism and International Labour, 1913–1923". History. 76 (248): 531. ISSN 0018-2648. JSTOR 24421507.
- Levy, Carl (1993). "Review of 'The Workers Themselves': Revolutionary Syndicalism and International Labour, 1913–1923". The English Historical Review. 108 (429): 1065–1066. doi:10.1093/ehr/CVIII.CCCCXXIX.1065. ISSN 0013-8266. JSTOR 575642.
- Papayanis, Nicholas (1991). "Review of 'The Workers Themselves': Revolutionary Syndicalism and International Labour, 1913–1923". The American Historical Review. 96 (5): 1523–1524. doi:10.2307/2165319. ISSN 0002-8762. JSTOR 2165319.
- Schönhoven, Klaus (1991). "Review of 'The Workers Themselves': Revolutionary Syndicalism and International Labour, 1913–1923". Historische Zeitschrift. 253 (3): 785–786. ISSN 0018-2613. JSTOR 27627928.
