= IWA–AIT =

International federation of anarcho-syndicalist labor unions

IWA/AIT
- International Workers' Association
- Asociación Internacional de los Trabajadores
- Founded: December 1922
- Headquarters: Targowa 22/27 a, 03-731 Warsaw, Poland
- Location: International
- Affiliations: Anarcho-syndicalism
- Website: www.iwa-ait.org

The International Workers' Association – Asociación Internacional de los Trabajadores (IWA–AIT) is an international federation of anarcho-syndicalist labor unions and initiatives.

It aims to create unions capable of fighting for the economic and political interests of the working class and eventually, to directly abolish capitalism and the state through "the establishment of economic communities and administrative organs run by the workers."

At its peak the International represented millions of people worldwide. Its member unions played a central role in the social conflicts of the 1920s and 1930s. However the International was formed as many countries were entering periods of extreme repression, and many of the largest IWA unions were shattered during that period.

== Ideology ==
The IWA explicitly rejects centralism, political parties, parliamentarism and statism, including the idea of the dictatorship of the proletariat, as offering the means to carry out such change, drawing heavily on anarchist critiques written both before and after the Russian revolution, most famously Mikhail Bakunin's suggestion that: "If you took the most ardent revolutionary, vested him in absolute power, within a year he would be worse than the Tsar himself."

Instead emphasis is placed on the organization of workers as the agents of social change through their ability to take direct action:

Revolutionary unionism asserts itself to be a supporter of the method of direct action, and aids and encourages all struggles that are not in contradiction to its own goals. Its methods of struggle are: strikes, boycotts, sabotage, etc. Direct action reaches its deepest expression in the general strike, which should also be, from the point of view of revolutionary unionism, the prelude to the social revolution.

...

Only in the economic and revolutionary organisations of the working class are there forces capable of bringing about its liberation and the necessary creative energy for the reorganisation of society on the basis of libertarian communism.

— Statutes of the IWA

=== Policies ===
From an early stage, the IWA has taken an anti-militarist stance, reflecting the overwhelming anarchist attitude since the First World War that the working class should not engage with the power struggles between ruling classes - and certainly should not die for them. It included a commitment to anti-militarism in its core principles and in 1926 it founded an International Anti-Militarist Coalition to promote disarmament and gather information on war production.

The IWA also states that syndicalists recognize violence as an acceptable defense against violence of the ruling classes, to be occur through the formation of a democratic popular militia rather than through a traditional military hierarchy. This has been posited as an alternative to the dictatorship of the proletariat model.

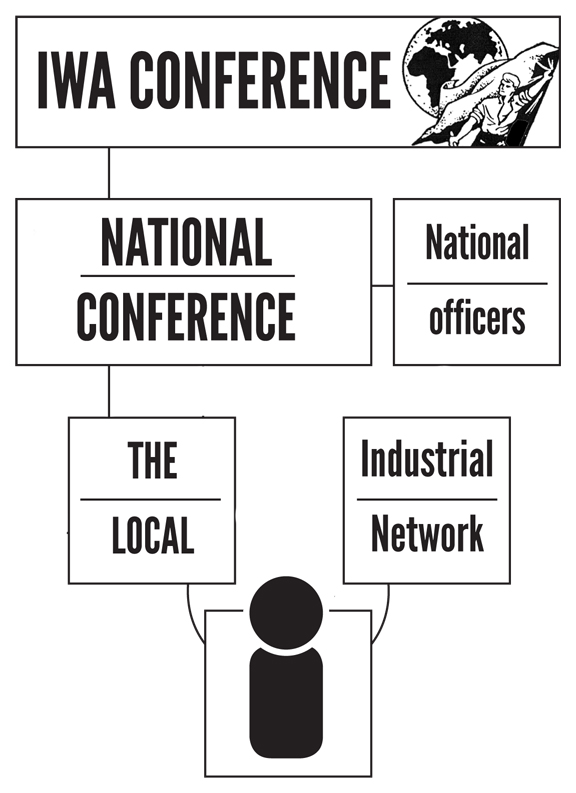
Sample flowchart of the relationship of an individual member of the Solidarity Federation to their national body and to the IWA, circa 2009.

== History ==
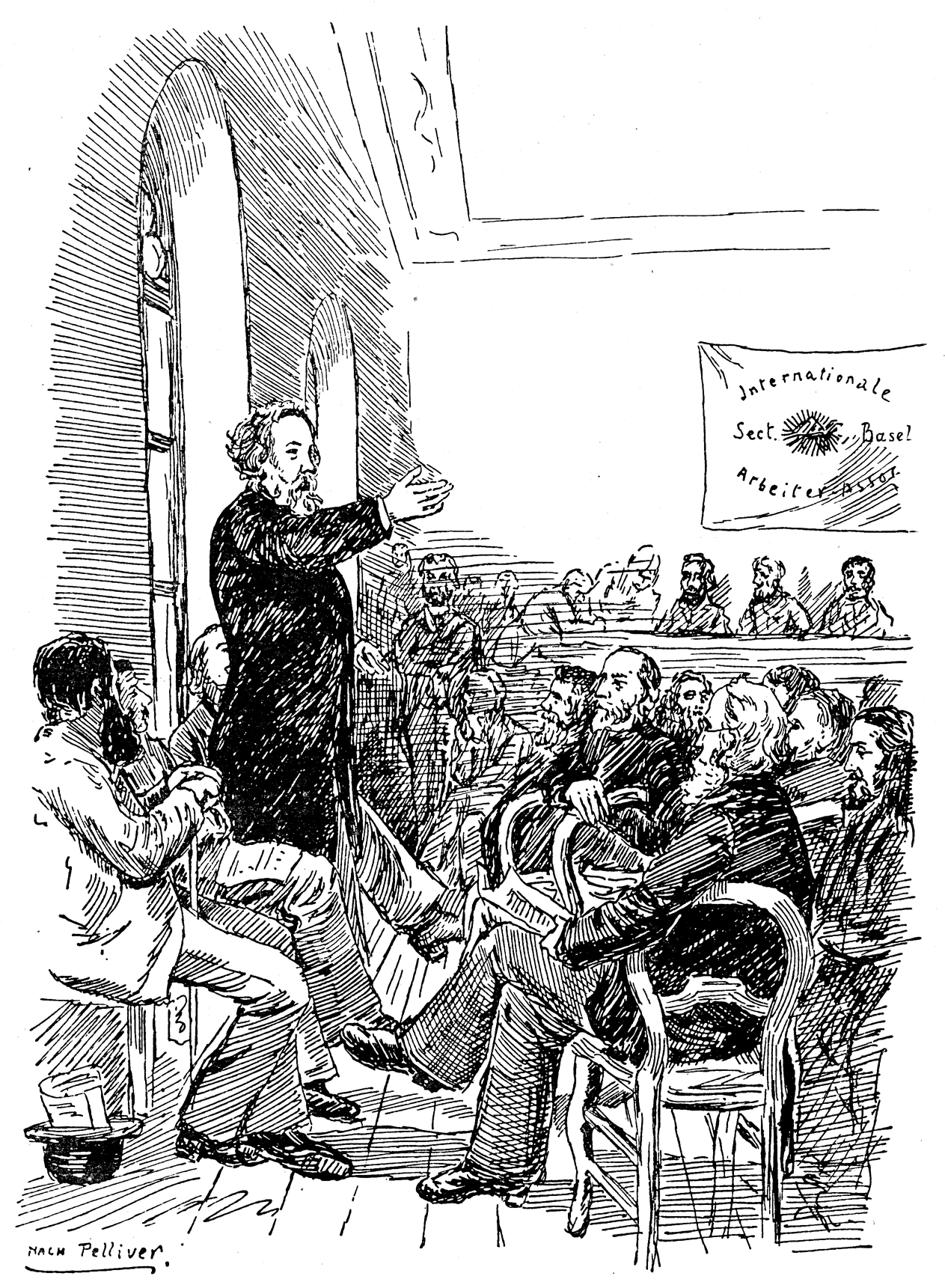
Bakunin speaking to members of the IWMA at the congress in Basel, 1869.

=== First International and revolutionary syndicalism (1864–1917) ===
The First International (International Workingmen's Association; IWMA) aimed at uniting a variety of different left-wing socialist, communist and anarchist political groups and Labor union that were based on the working class and class struggle.

Its split prompted several attempts to start specifically anarchist Internationals, notably the Anarchist St. Imier International (1872-1881) and the Black International (1881–87). However heavy repression in France of the Paris Commune, as well as in Spain and Italy, alongside the rise of propaganda of the deed within the anarchist movement and a dominant strand of social-democracy on the wider left wing in Europe, meant that serious moves to establish an anarcho-syndicalist international would not begin until the early 20th century.

After the end of the war however, with the workers' movement resurgent following the October Revolution and subsequent Russian Civil War, what was to become the modern IWA was formed, billing itself as the "true heir" of the original international.

=== Rejection of Bolshevism and founding of the IWA (1918–1922) ===
The success of the Bolsheviks in Russia in 1918 resulted in a wave of syndicalist successes worldwide, including the struggle of the Industrial Workers of the World (IWW) in the USA alongside the creation of mass anarchist unions across Latin America and huge syndicalist-led strikes in Germany, Portugal, Spain, Italy and France, where it was noted that "neutral (economic, but not political) syndicalism had been swept away."

For many in this new revolutionary wave, Russia seemed to offer a successful alternative to social democratic reformism, so when in 1919 the Bolshevik Party issued an appeal for all workers to join it in building a new Red International it was met with great interest. Almost all of the syndicalist unions attended the 1920 congress of the Bolsheviks' international of communists, the Comintern, which unions in France and Italy joined immediately. In contrast, attempts to organize a conference of anarchists in February 1919 in Copenhagen had seen only the Scandinavians able to attend.

The final formation of this new international, then known as the International Workingmen's Association, took place at an illegal conference in Berlin in December 1922, marking an irrevocable break between the international syndicalist movement and the Bolsheviks.

Signatories to the founding statement of the International Workingmen's Association included groups from around the world. The single largest anarcho-syndicalist union at the time, the CNT in Spain, was unable to attend when their delegates were arrested on the way to the conference, though they did join the following year, bringing 600,000 members into the international. Despite the CNT's absence, the international represented well over 1 million workers at its inauguration:

- The Italian Syndicalist Union (USI): 500,000 members
- The Regional Federation of Argentine Workers (FORA): 200,000
- The General Confederation of Labour (CGT) in Portugal: 150,000
- The Free Workers' Union of Germany (FAUD): 120,000
- The Committee for the Defense of Syndicalism (CDS) in France: 100,000
- The Central Organisation of the Workers of Sweden (SAC): 32,000
- The General Confederation of Workers (CGT) in Mexico: 30,000
- The National Labor Secretariat (NAS) in the Netherlands: 22,500
- The Industrial Workers of the World (IWW) in Chile: 20,000
- The Norwegian Syndicalist Federation (NSF) in Norway: 20,000
- The Union for Syndicalist Propaganda in Denmark: 600

The biggest syndicalist union in the US, the IWW, considered joining but eventually ruled out affiliation in 1936, citing the IWA's policies on religious and political affiliation.

=== Decline and repression (1923–1939) ===
In Argentina, the FORA had already begun a process of decline by the time it joined the IWA, having split in 1915 into pro and anti-Bolshevik factions. From 1922, the anarchist movement there lost most of its membership, exacerbated by further splits, most notably around the Severino Di Giovanni affair. It was crushed by General Uriburu's military coup in 1930.

Wartime CNT propaganda.

Portugal's CGT was driven underground after an unsuccessful attempt to break the newly installed President of Portugal, Gomes da Costa, with a general strike in 1927 which led to nearly 100 deaths. It survived underground with 15–20,000 members until January 1934, when it called a general revolutionary strike, which failed, against plans to replace trade unions with corporations. It was able to continue in a much reduced state until World War II, but was effectively finished as a fighting union. Massive government repression repeated such defeats around the world, as anarcho-syndicalist unions were destroyed in Peru, Brazil, Columbia, Japan, Cuba, Bulgaria, Paraguay and Bolivia. By the end of the 1930s legal anarcho-syndicalist trade unions existed only in Chile, Bolivia, Sweden and Uruguay.

=== Later developments (1940–) ===
At the tenth congress in 1958, the SAC's response to its pressures led it into a clash with the rest of the international. It withdrew from the IWA following its failure to amend the body's statutes to allow it to stand in municipal elections and amid concerns over its integration with the state over distribution of unemployment benefits.

In the early 2000s, the organisation Priama akcia (English: Direct action) was established in Slovakia and became the Slovak section of the IWA. It has published the journal Žerme bohatých (English: Let's eat the rich), which has reported on strike actions and trade union struggles in both Slovakia and the rest of the world.

By the 21st century, the IWA was experiencing an internal crisis. This process culminated in 2016, with the expulsion of the CNT (Spain), USI (Italy), FAU (Germany). The following year, some sections of the CNT broke away and established the "CNT-AIT", which received official recognition from the IWA, although it was disorganised, had a small membership and did not carry out any union activity. In 2018, the expelled sections of the IWA established a new international organisation, the International Confederation of Labour (Confederación Internacional del Trabajo; ICL-CIT). Alongside the CNT, USI and FAU, other affiliated organisations included the North American Regional Administration of the IWW, FORA (Argentina), ESE (Greece), and IP (Poland).

== Sections ==
These are the sections and their websites as provided on IWA-AIT's website.

Country	Name	Acronym	Website
Argentina	FORA-AIT	FORA-AIT	https://foraait.wordpress.com/
Australia	Anarcho-Syndicalist Federation	ASF-IWA	https://asf-iwa.org.au/
Austria	Wiener ArbeiterInnen Syndikat	WAS	https://wiensyndikat.wordpress.com/
Brazil	Brazilian Workers' Confederation	COB	https://www.acat-ait.org/category/brazil/
Britain	Solidarity Federation	SF	http://solfed.org.uk/
Colombia	Unión Libertaria Estudiantil y del Trabajo	ULET	https://www.uletsindical.org/
France	CNT-AIT de Toulouse	CNT-AIT	https://cntaittoulouse.lautre.net
Indonesia	Anarko Syndicalist Worker’s Fraternity	PPAS	
Norway	Norwegian Syndicalist Federation	NSF-IAA	https://www.nsf-iaa.org
Pakistan	Workers Solidarity Federation	WSF	https://wsipakistan.pk
Poland	Union of Syndicalists, Poland	ZSP	https://zsp.net.pl
Russia	Confederation of Revolutionary Anarcho-Syndicalists	KRAS-MAT	https://www.aitrus.info/
Serbia	Union Confederation Anarcho-Syndicalist Initiative	ASI-MUR	https://inicijativa.org/
Slovakia	Direct Action		https://www.priamaakcia.sk/
Spain	Confederación Anarcosindicalista	CNT-AIT	https://confederacion.anarcosindicalista.org/
Sweden	Örestad Local Group	OLS	https://orestadls.wordpress.com

== Other anarchist internationals and international networks ==
- Anarchist St. Imier International (1872–1877)
- International Working People's Association (1881–1887)
- International of Anarchist Federations (1968–)
