= Aristide Lapeyre =

French anarchist (1899–1974)

- Born: January 31, 1899; Monguilhem, France
- Died: March 23, 1974 (aged 75); Bordeaux, France
- Occupation: Trade unionist
- Known for: Anarchist activism

Aristide Lapeyre (1899–1974) was a French anarchist activist, trade unionist, and free-thinker.
