= Anarchism and violence =

Anarchism and violence have been linked together by events in anarchist history such as violent revolution, terrorism, and assassination attempts. Leading late 19th century anarchists espoused propaganda by deed, or attentáts, and was associated with a number of incidents of political violence. Anarchist thought, however, is quite diverse on the question of violence. Where some anarchists have opposed coercive means on the basis of coherence, others have supported acts of violent revolution as a path toward anarchy. Anarcho-pacifism is a school of thought within anarchism which rejects all violence.

Many anarchists regard the state to be at the definitional center of structural violence: directly or indirectly preventing people from meeting their basic needs, calling for violence as self-defense. (Note: See also: Right of self-defense)

== Propaganda by the deed ==
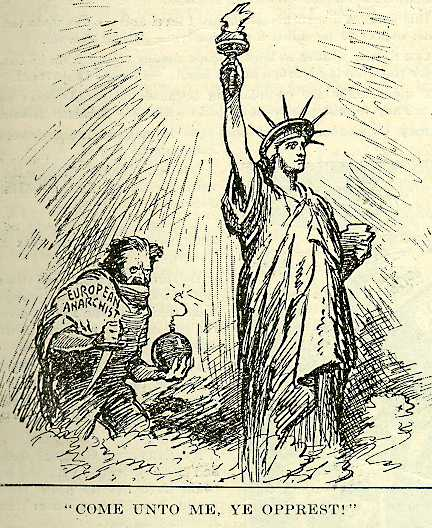
An American political cartoon, published in 1919, depicting a European anarchist preparing to destroy the Statue of Liberty.

Propaganda by deed (or propaganda of the deed, from the French propagande par le fait) is specific political direct action meant to be exemplary to others and serve as a catalyst for revolution. It is primarily associated with acts of violence perpetrated by proponents of insurrectionary anarchism in the late 19th and early 20th century, including bombings and assassinations aimed at the State, the ruling class, and Church arsons targeting religious groups, even though propaganda of the deed also had non-violent applications. These acts of terrorism were intended to ignite a "spirit of revolt" by demonstrating the state, the middle and upper classes, and religious organizations were not omnipotent and also to provoke the State to become escalatingly repressive in its response. The 1881 London Social Revolutionary Congress gave the tactic its approval.

The Italian revolutionary Carlo Pisacane wrote in his "Political Testament" (1857) that "ideas spring from deeds and not the other way around" and Mikhail Bakunin stated in 1870 that "we must spread our principles, not with words but with deeds, for this is the most popular, the most potent, and the most irresistible form of propaganda." By the 1880s, the slogan "propaganda by deed" had begun to be used both within and outside of the anarchist movement to refer to individual bombings, regicides and tyrannicides, and was formally adopted as a strategy by the anarchist 1881 London Social Revolutionary Congress.

While revolutionary bombings and assassinations appeared as an indiscriminate call to violence to outsiders, anarchists saw "the idea of the propaganda by deed, or the attentat (attack), [as having] a very specific logic". In a capitalist world founded on force and constant threat of violence (laws, church, paychecks), "to do nothing, to stand idly by while millions suffered, was itself to commit an act of violence". This did not seek to justify violence but find what violence would effectively undo malignant state forces. Propaganda by deed included stealing (in particular bank robberies – named "expropriations" or "revolutionary expropriations" to finance the organization), rioting and general strikes which aimed at creating the conditions of an insurrection or even a revolution. These acts were justified as the necessary counterpart to state repression. As early as 1911, Leon Trotsky condemned individual acts of violence by anarchists as useful for little more than providing an excuse for state repression. "The anarchist prophets of the 'propaganda by the deed' can argue all they want about the elevating and stimulating influence of terrorist acts on the masses," he wrote in 1911, "Theoretical considerations and political experience prove otherwise." Vladimir Lenin largely agreed, viewing individual anarchist acts of terrorism as an ineffective substitute for coordinated action by disciplined cadres of the masses. Both Lenin and Trotsky acknowledged the necessity of violent rebellion and assassination to serve as a catalyst for revolution, but they distinguished between the ad hoc bombings and assassinations carried out by proponents of the propaganda by deed, and organized violence coordinated by a professional revolutionary vanguard utilized for that specific end.

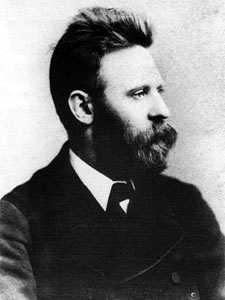
Johann Most

Some anarchists, such as Johann Most, advocated publicizing violent acts of retaliation against counter-revolutionaries to "preach ... action as propaganda". It was not advocacy for mass murder, but a call for targeted killings of the representatives of capitalism and government at a time when such action might garner sympathy from the population, such as during periods of government repression or labor conflicts, although Most himself once claimed that "the existing system will be quickest and most radically overthrown by the annihilation of its exponents. Therefore, massacres of the enemies of the people must be set in motion." In 1885, he published The Science of Revolutionary Warfare, a technical manual for acquiring and detonating explosives based on the knowledge he acquired by working at an explosives factory in New Jersey. Most was an early influence on American anarchists Emma Goldman and Alexander Berkman. Berkman attempted propaganda by deed when he tried in 1892 to kill industrialist Henry Clay Frick following the deaths by shooting of several striking workers.

As early as 1887, a few important figures in the anarchist movement had begun to distance themselves from individual acts of violence. Peter Kropotkin thus wrote that year in Le Révolté that "a structure based on centuries of history cannot be destroyed with a few kilos of dynamite". A variety of anarchists advocated the abandonment of these sorts of tactics in favor of collective revolutionary action, for example through the trade union movement. The anarcho-syndicalist, Fernand Pelloutier, argued in 1895 for renewed anarchist involvement in the labor movement on the basis that anarchism could do very well without "the individual dynamiter." State repression (including the infamous 1894 French lois scélérates) of the anarchist and labor movements following the few successful bombings and assassinations may have contributed to the abandonment of these kinds of tactics, although reciprocally state repression, in the first place, may have played a role in these isolated acts. The dismemberment of the French socialist movement, into many groups and, following the suppression of the 1871 Paris Commune, the execution and exile of many communards to penal colonies, favored individualist political expression and acts.

The anarchist Luigi Galleani, perhaps the most vocal proponent of propaganda by deed from the turn of the century through the end of the First World War, took undisguised pride in describing himself as a subversive, a revolutionary propagandist and advocate of the violent overthrow of established government and institutions through the use of 'direct action', i.e., bombings and assassinations. Galleani heartily embraced physical violence and terrorism, not only against symbols of the government and the capitalist system, such as courthouses and factories, but also through direct assassination of 'enemies of the people': capitalists, industrialists, politicians, judges, and policemen. He had a particular interest in the use of bombs, going so far as to include a formula for the explosive nitroglycerine in one of his pamphlets advertised through his monthly magazine, Cronaca Sovversiva. By all accounts, Galleani was an extremely effective speaker and advocate of his policy of violent action, attracting a number of devoted Italian-American anarchist followers who called themselves Galleanists. Carlo Buda, the brother of Galleanist bombmaker Mario Buda, said of him, "You heard Galleani speak, and you were ready to shoot the first policeman you saw".

== Anarcho-pacifism ==
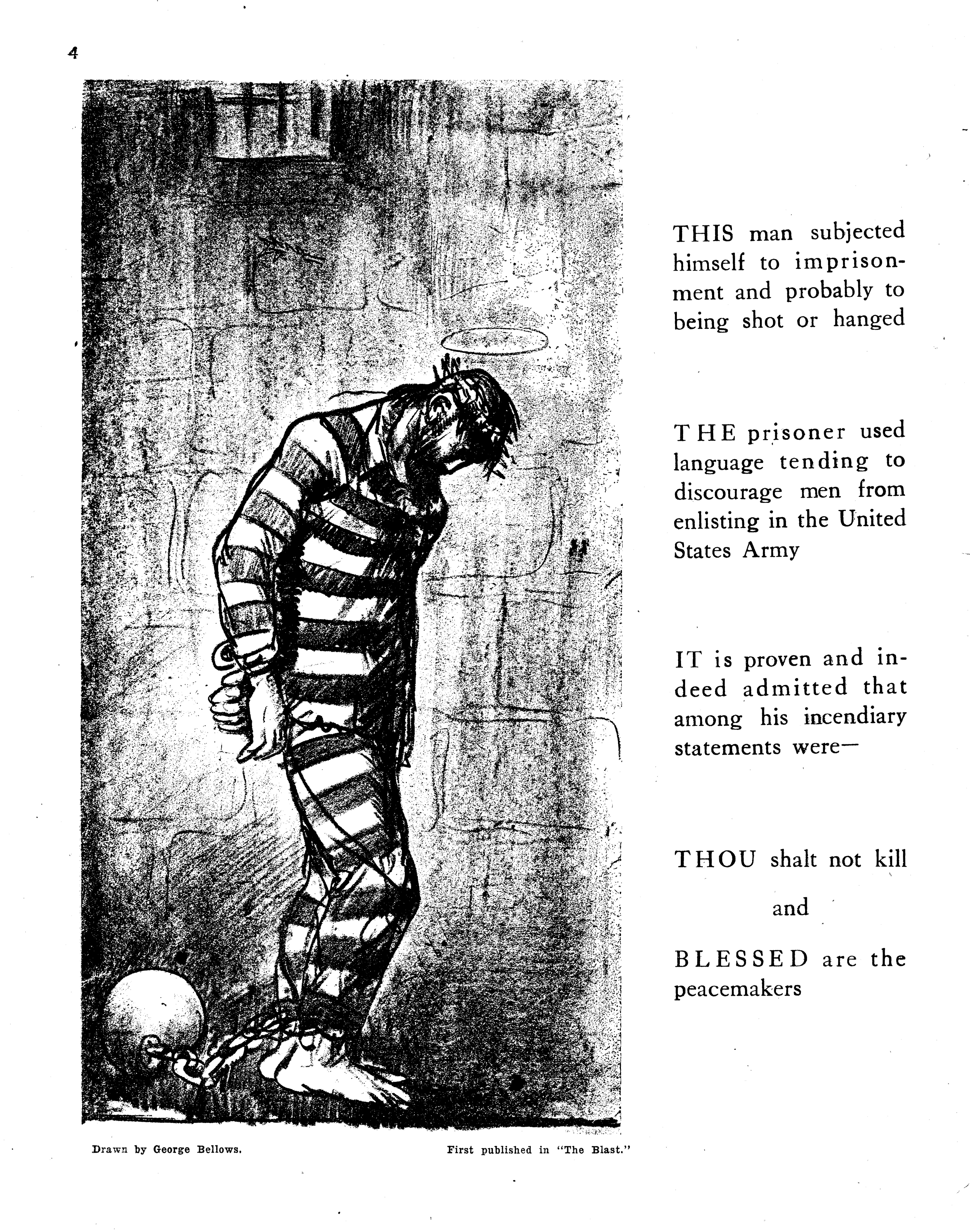
Blessed are the Peacemakers by George Bellows, The Masses, 1917.

Anarcho-pacifism (also pacifist anarchism or anarchist pacifism) is a form of anarchism which completely rejects the use of violence in any form for any purpose. Important proponents include Leo Tolstoy and Bart de Ligt. Mohandas Gandhi is an important influence.

Henry David Thoreau, though not a pacifist himself, influenced both Leo Tolstoy and Mohandas Gandhi's advocacy of Nonviolent resistance through his work Civil Disobedience.

At some point anarcho-pacifism had as its main proponent Christian anarchism. The first large-scale anarcho-pacifist movement was the Tolstoyan peasant movement in Russia. They were a predominantly peasant movement that set up hundreds of voluntary anarchist pacifist communes based on their interpretation of Christianity as requiring absolute pacifism and the rejection of all coercive authority.

"Dutch anarchist-pacifist Bart de Ligt's 1936 treatise The Conquest of Violence (with its none too subtle allusion to Kropotkin's The Conquest of Bread) was also of signal importance." "Gandhi's ideas were popularized in the West in books such as Richard Gregg's The Power of Nonviolence (1935), and Bart de Ligt's The Conquest of Violence (1937). Peter Gelderloos criticizes the idea that nonviolence is the only way to fight for a better world. According to Gelderloos, pacifism as an ideology serves the interests of the state.

== Anarchist theory ==
Anarchism encompasses a variety of views about violence. The Tolstoyan tradition of non-violent resistance is prevalent among some anarchists. Ursula K. Le Guin's novel The Dispossessed, a fictional novel about a society that practices "Odonianism", expressed this anarchism:

Odonianism is anarchism. Not the bomb-in-the-pocket stuff, which is terrorism, whatever name it tries to dignify itself with, not the social-Darwinist economic 'libertarianism' of the far right; but anarchism, as prefigured in early Taoist thought, and expounded by Shelley and Kropotkin, Goldman and Goodman. Anarchism's principal target is the authoritarian State (capitalist or socialist); its principle moral-practical theme is cooperation (solidarity, mutual aid). It is the most idealistic, and to me the most interesting, of all political theories.

Emma Goldman included in her definition of Anarchism the observation that all governments rest on violence, and this is one of the many reasons they should be opposed. Goldman herself didn't oppose tactics like assassination in her early career, but changed her views after she went to Russia, where she witnessed the violence of the Russian state and the Red Army. From then on she condemned the use of terrorism, especially by the state, and advocated violence only as a means of self-defense.

=== Discourse on violent and non-violent means ===
Some anarchists see violent revolution as necessary in the abolition of capitalist society, while others advocate non-violent methods. Errico Malatesta, an anarcho-communist, propounded that it is "necessary to destroy with violence, since one cannot do otherwise, the violence which denies [the means of life and for development] to the workers." As he put it in Umanità Nova (no. 125, September 6, 1921):

It is our aspiration and our aim that everyone should become socially conscious and effective; but to achieve this end, it is necessary to provide all with the means of life and for development, and it is therefore necessary to destroy with violence, since one cannot do otherwise, the violence that denies these means to the workers.

Anarchists with this view advocate violence insofar as they see it to be necessary in ridding the world of exploitation, and especially states.

Pierre-Joseph Proudhon argued in favor of a non-violent revolution through a process of dual power in which libertarian socialist institutions would be established and form associations enabling the formation of an expanding network within the existing state-capitalist framework with the intention of eventually rendering both the state and the capitalist economy obsolete. The progression towards violence in anarchism stemmed, in part, from the massacres of some of the communes inspired by the ideas of Proudhon and others. Many anarcho-communists began to see a need for revolutionary violence to counteract the violence inherent in both capitalism and government.

Anarcho-pacifism is a tendency within the anarchist movement which rejects the use of violence in the struggle for social change. The main early influences were the thought of Henry David Thoreau and Leo Tolstoy. It developed "mostly in Holland, Britain, and the United States, before and during the Second World War". Opposition to the use of violence has not prohibited anarcho-pacifists from accepting the principle of resistance or even revolutionary action provided it does not result in violence; it was in fact their approval of such forms of opposition to power that lead many anarcho-pacifists to endorse the anarcho-syndicalist concept of the general strike as the great revolutionary weapon. Later anarcho-pacifists have also come to endorse the non-violent strategy of dual power.

Other anarchists have believed that violence is justified, especially in self-defense, as a way to provoke social upheaval which could lead to a social revolution.

Peter Gelderloos criticizes the idea that nonviolence is the only way to fight for a better world. According to Gelderloos, pacifism as an ideology serves the interests of the state and is hopelessly caught up psychologically with the control schema of patriarchy and white supremacy. The influential publishing collective CrimethInc. notes that "violence" and "nonviolence" are politicized terms that are used inconsistently in discourse, depending on whether or not a writer seeks to legitimize the actor in question. They argue that "[i]t's not strategic [for anarchists] to focus on delegitimizing each other's efforts rather than coordinating to act together where we overlap". For this reason, both CrimethInc. and Gelderloos advocate for diversity of tactics. Albert Meltzer criticised extreme pacifism as authoritarian, believing that "The cult of extreme nonviolence always implies an elite." However, he did believe that less extreme pacifism was compatible with anarchism.

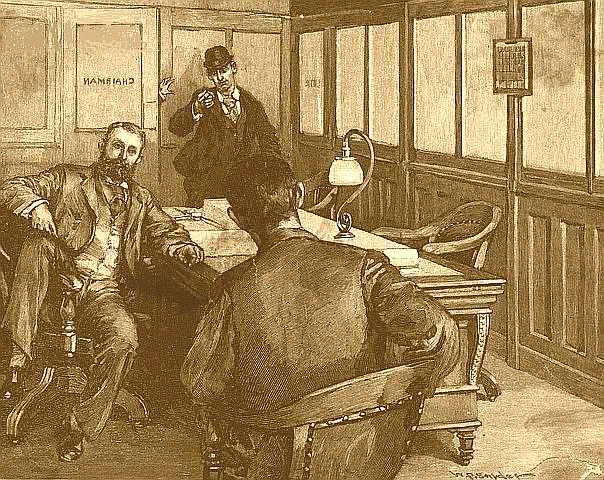
Alexander Berkman's attempt to assassinate industrialist Henry Clay Frick, as illustrated by W. P. Snyder for Harper's Weekly in 1892.

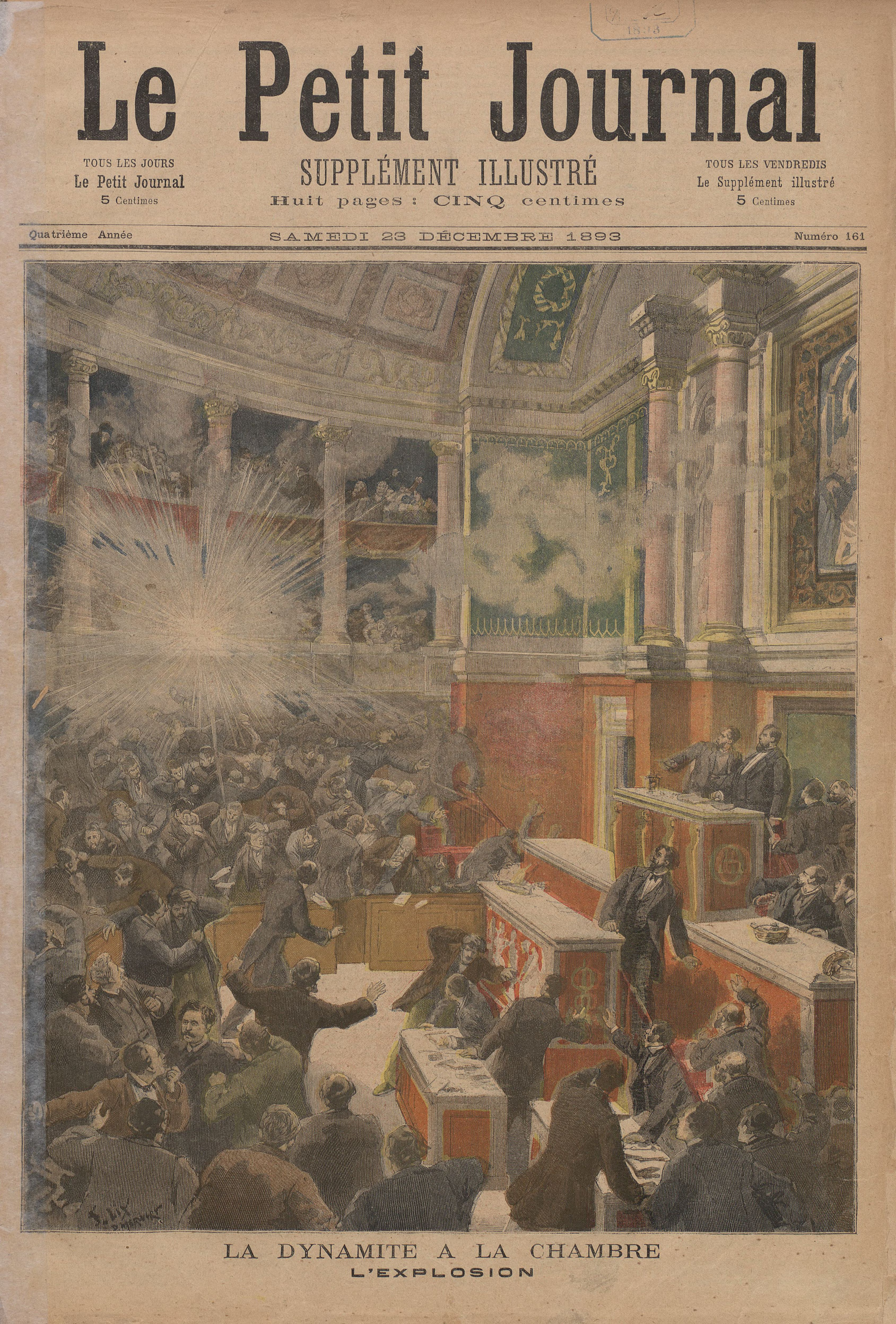
Artist's rendition of the bomb thrown by the anarchist Auguste Vaillant into the Chamber of Deputies of the French National Assembly in December 1893

== Notable actions ==
- July 23, 1892 – Alexander Berkman tries to kill American industrialist Henry Clay Frick in retaliation for the hiring of Pinkerton detectives to break up the Homestead Strike, resulting in the deaths of seven striking members of the Amalgamated Association of Iron and Steel Workers. Although badly wounded, Frick survives, and Berkman is arrested and eventually sentenced to 22 years in prison.

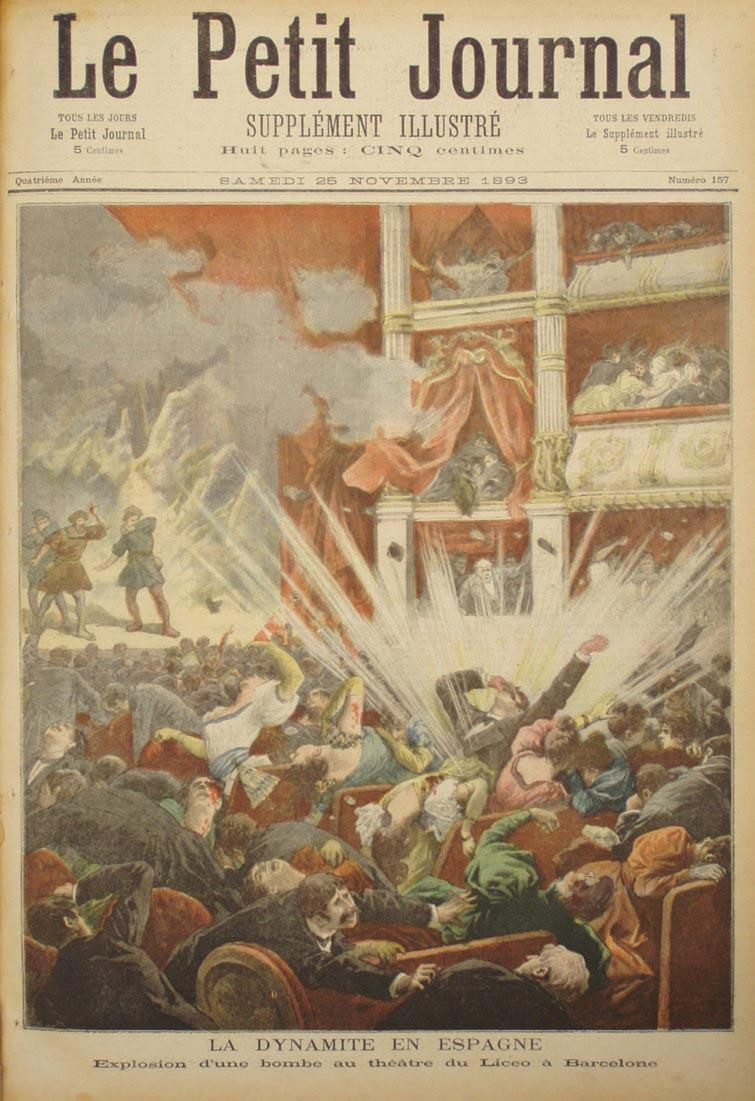
Explosion of Liceu of Barcelona by the anarchist Santiago Salvador in the cover of the newspaper Le Petit Journal, November 7, 1893

- November 7, 1893 – The Spanish anarchist Santiago Salvador throws two Orsini bombs into the orchestra pit of the Liceu Theater in Barcelona during the second act of the opera Guillaume Tell, killing some twenty people and injuring scores of others.
- December 9, 1893 – Auguste Vaillant throws a nail bomb in the French National Assembly, killing nobody and injuring one. He is then sentenced to death and executed by the guillotine on February 4, 1894, shouting "Death to bourgeois society and long live anarchy!" (À mort la société bourgeoise et vive l'anarchie!). During his trial, Vaillant declares that he had not intended to kill anybody, but only to injure several deputies in retaliation against the execution of Ravachol, who was executed for four bombings.
- February 12, 1894 – Émile Henry, intending to avenge Auguste Vaillant, sets off a bomb in Café Terminus (a café near the Gare Saint-Lazare train station in Paris), killing one and injuring twenty. During his trial, when asked why he wanted to harm so many innocent people, he declares, "There is no innocent bourgeois." This act is one of the rare exceptions to the rule that propaganda by deed targets only specific powerful individuals. Henry was convicted and executed by guillotine on May 21.
- February 15, 1894 – A chemical explosive carried by Martial Bourdin prematurely detonates outside the Royal Observatory, Greenwich in Greenwich Park, killing him.
- June 24, 1894 – Italian anarchist Sante Geronimo Caserio, seeking revenge for Auguste Vaillant and Émile Henry, stabs Sadi Carnot, the President of France, to death. Caserio is executed by guillotine on August 15.

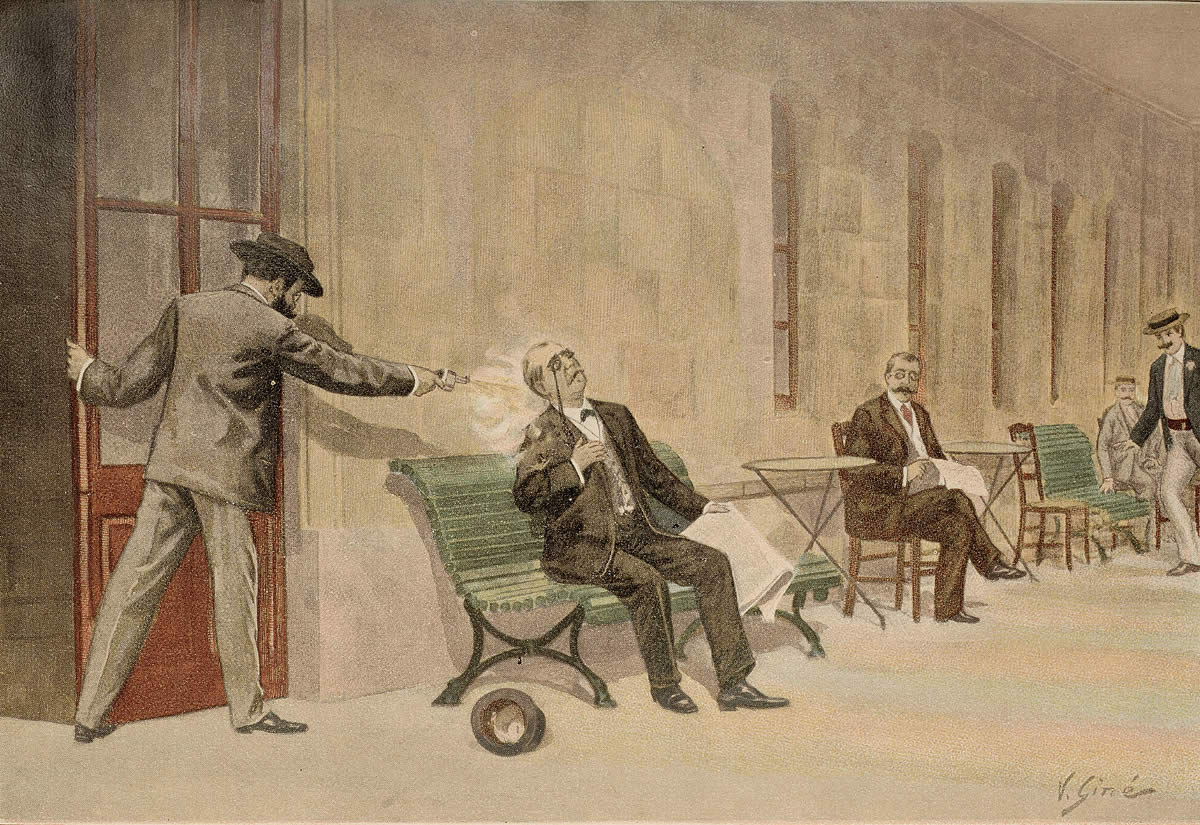
Assassination of Spanish Prime Minister Antonio Cánovas del Castillo by Michele Angiolillo in August 1897.

- August 8, 1897 – Michele Angiolillo shoots dead Spanish Prime Minister Antonio Cánovas del Castillo at a thermal bath resort, seeking vengeance for the imprisonment and torture of alleged revolutionaries in the Montjuïc trial. Angiolillo is executed by garotte on August 20.

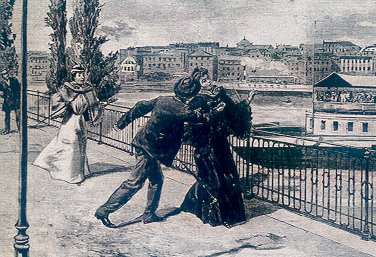
An artist's rendition of the stabbing of Empress Elisabeth of Austria by the Italian anarchist Luigi Lucheni in Geneva, September 10, 1898.

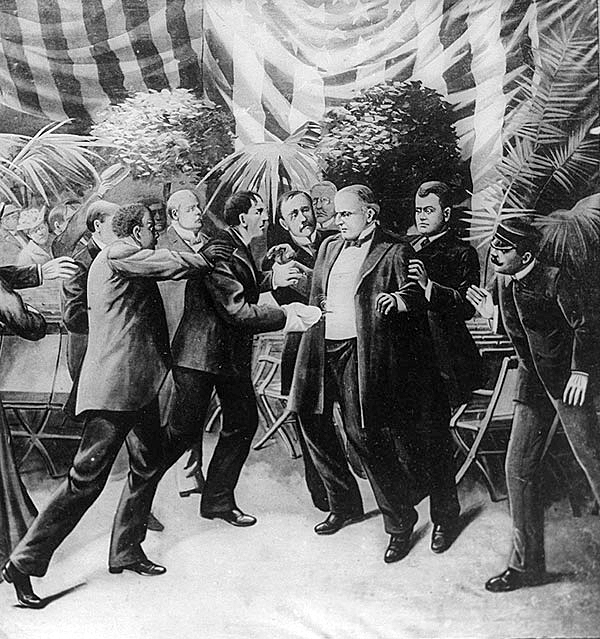
A sketch of Leon Czolgosz shooting McKinley in New York, September 6, 1901.

- September 10, 1898 – Luigi Lucheni stabs to death Empress Elisabeth, the consort of Emperor Franz Joseph I of Austria-Hungary, with a needle file in Geneva, Switzerland. Lucheni is sentenced to life in prison and eventually commits suicide in his cell.
- July 29, 1900 – Gaetano Bresci shoots dead King Umberto of Italy, in revenge for the Bava Beccaris massacre in Milan. Due to the abolition of capital punishment in Italy, Bresci is sentenced to penal servitude for life on Santo Stefano Island, where he is found dead less than a year later.
- September 6, 1901 – Leon Czolgosz fatally shoots U.S. President William McKinley at point-blank range at the Pan-American Exposition in Buffalo, New York. McKinley dies on September 14, and Czolgosz is executed by electric chair on October 29. Czolgosz's anarchist views have been debated.
- November 15, 1902 – Gennaro Rubino attempts to murder King Leopold II of Belgium as he returns in a procession from a Requiem Mass for his recently deceased wife, Queen Marie Henriette. All three of Rubino's shots miss the monarch's carriage, and he is quickly subdued by the crowd and taken into police custody. He is sentenced to life imprisonment and dies in prison in 1918.
- July 21, 1905 – Members of the Armenian Revolutionary Federation launch an attempt on the life of Ottoman Sultan Abdul Hamid II, but the bomb missed its target, instead killing 26 people and wounded 58 others. One of the conspirators, the Armenian anarchist Christapor Mikaelian, was killed during the planning stages. The Belgian anarchist Edward Joris was also among those arrested and convicted for their part in the plot.

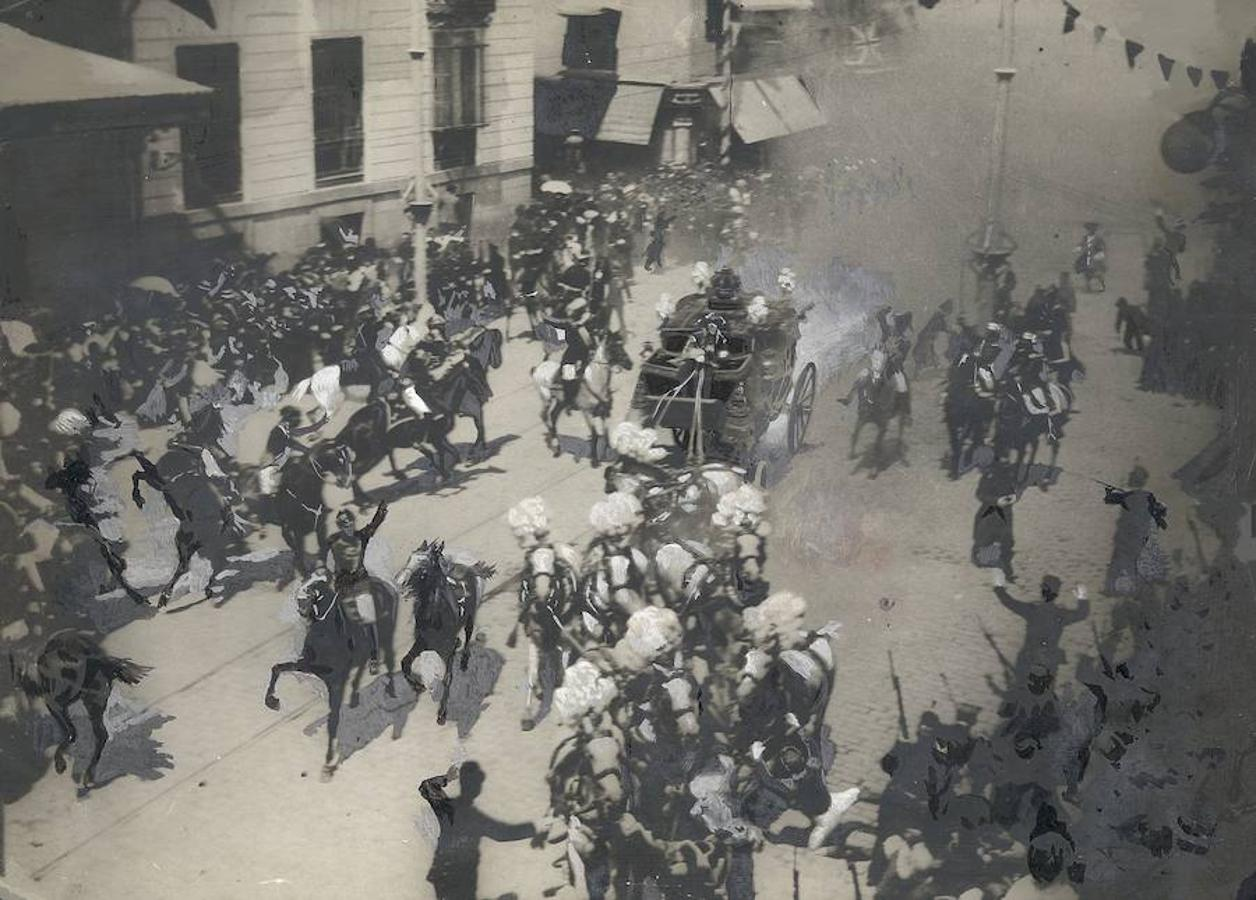
The attempted regicide of Alfonso XIII of Spain and Princess Victoria Eugenie of Battenberg by Catalan anarchist Mateu Morral, May 31, 1906.

- May 31, 1906 – Catalan anarchist Mateu Morral tries to kill King Alfonso XIII of Spain and Queen Victoria Eugenie immediately after their wedding by throwing a bomb into the procession. The King and Queen are unhurt, but 24 bystanders and horses are killed and over 100 persons injured. Morral is apprehended two days later and commits suicide while being transferred to prison.
- February 1, 1908 – Manuel Buíça and Alfredo Costa shoot to death King Carlos I of Portugal and his son, Crown Prince Luís Filipe, respectively, in the Lisbon Regicide. Both Buíça and Costa, who are sympathetic to a republican movement in Portugal that includes anarchist elements, are shot dead by police officers.
- June 15, 1910 – The Bosnian anarchist Bogdan Žerajić attempts to assassinate the Governor of Bosnia and Herzegovian Marijan Varešanin, but failed and subsequently committed suicide.
- September 14, 1911 – Dmitri Bogrov shoots Russian prime minister Pyotr Stolypin at the Kiev Opera House in the presence of Tsar Nicholas II and two of his daughters, Grand Duchesses Olga and Tatiana. Stolypin dies four days later, and Bogrov is hanged on September 25.
- November 12, 1912 – Anarchist Manuel Pardiñas shoots Spanish Prime Minister José Canalejas dead in front of a Madrid bookstore. Pardiñas then immediately turns the gun on himself and commits suicide.
- March 18, 1913 – Alexandros Schinas shoots dead King George I of Greece while the monarch is on a walk near the White Tower of Thessaloniki. Schinas is captured and tortured; he commits suicide on May 6 by jumping out the window of the gendarmerie, although there is speculation that he could have been thrown to his death.
- July 4, 1914 – A bomb being prepared for use at John D. Rockefeller's home at Tarrytown, New York explodes prematurely, killing three anarchists, Arthur Caron, Carl Hansen and Charles Berg, and an innocent woman, Mary Chavez.
- October 13 and November 14, 1914 – Galleanists – radical followers of Luigi Galleani – explode two bombs in New York City after police forcibly disperse a protest by anarchists and communists at John D. Rockefeller's home in Tarrytown.

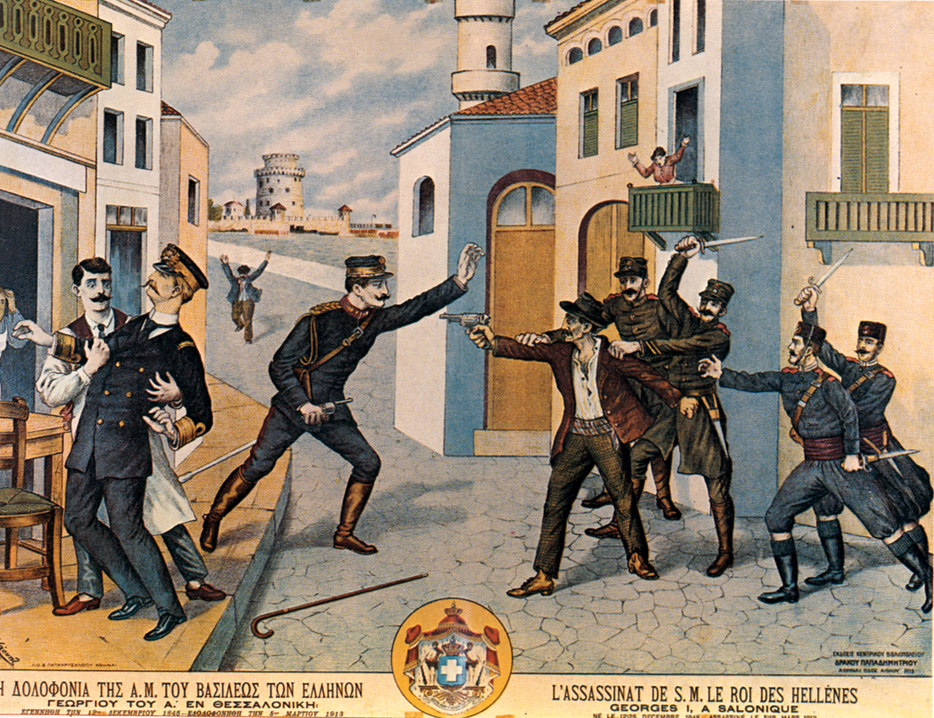
Assassination of George I of Greece by Alexandros Schinas in 1913 as depicted in a contemporary lithograph.

- September 16, 1920 – The Wall Street bombing kills 38 and wounds 400 in the Manhattan Financial District. Galleanists are believed responsible, particularly Mario Buda, the group's principal bombmaker, although the crime remains officially unsolved.
- September 27, 1932 – A dynamite-filled package bomb left by Galleanists destroys Judge Webster Thayer's home in Worcester, Massachusetts, injuring his wife and a housekeeper. Judge Thayer had presided over the trials of Galleanists Sacco and Vanzetti.

== See also ==
- Artivism
- Civil disobedience
- List of assassinations
- List of terrorist incidents
- V (character)

== Bibliography ==
- Abidor, Mitchell, ed. (2016). Death to Bourgeois Society: The Propagandists of the Deed. PM Press. ISBN 978-1629631127.
- Bantman, Constance (2018). "The Era of Propaganda by the Deed". In Adams, Matthew S.; Levy, Carl (eds.). The Palgrave Handbook of Anarchism. London: Palgrave Macmillan. pp. 371–388. doi:10.1007/978-3-319-75620-2_22. ISBN 978-3319756196. S2CID 150140014.
- Billington, James (1980). Fire in the Minds of Men. Basic Books. ISBN 0-465-02405-X. LCCN 79-2750.
- Coolsaet, Rick (September 2004). "Anarchist outrages". Le Monde diplomatique.
- Gage, Beverly (2009). The Day Wall Street Exploded: A Story of America in its First Age of Terror. New York: Oxford University Press. ISBN 978-0199759286.
- Merriman, John (2009). The Dynamite Club. Boston: Houghton Mifflin Harcourt. ISBN 978-0-618-55598-7.
