= Anarcho-pacifism =

Anarchist school of thought

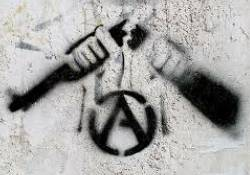
Broken rifle and Circle-A

Anarcho-pacifism, also referred to as anarchist pacifism and pacifist anarchism, is a school of thought in anarchism that advocates for the use of peaceful, ethical, and non-violent forms of resistance in the struggle for social change. Anarcho-pacifism rejects the principle of violence, which is seen as a form of power and therefore as contradictory to key anarchist ideals such as the rejection of hierarchy and dominance. Many anarcho-pacifists are also Christian anarchists, who often reject war and the use of violence.

Anarcho-pacifists reject the use of violence, but accept non-violent revolutionary action against capitalism and the state with the purpose of establishing a peaceful voluntary society. The main early influences were the philosophies of Henry David Thoreau and Leo Tolstoy, while the later ideas of Mahatma Gandhi gained significance. Anarcho-pacifist movements primarily emerged in the Netherlands, Russia, the United Kingdom and the United States before and during World War II.

== History ==
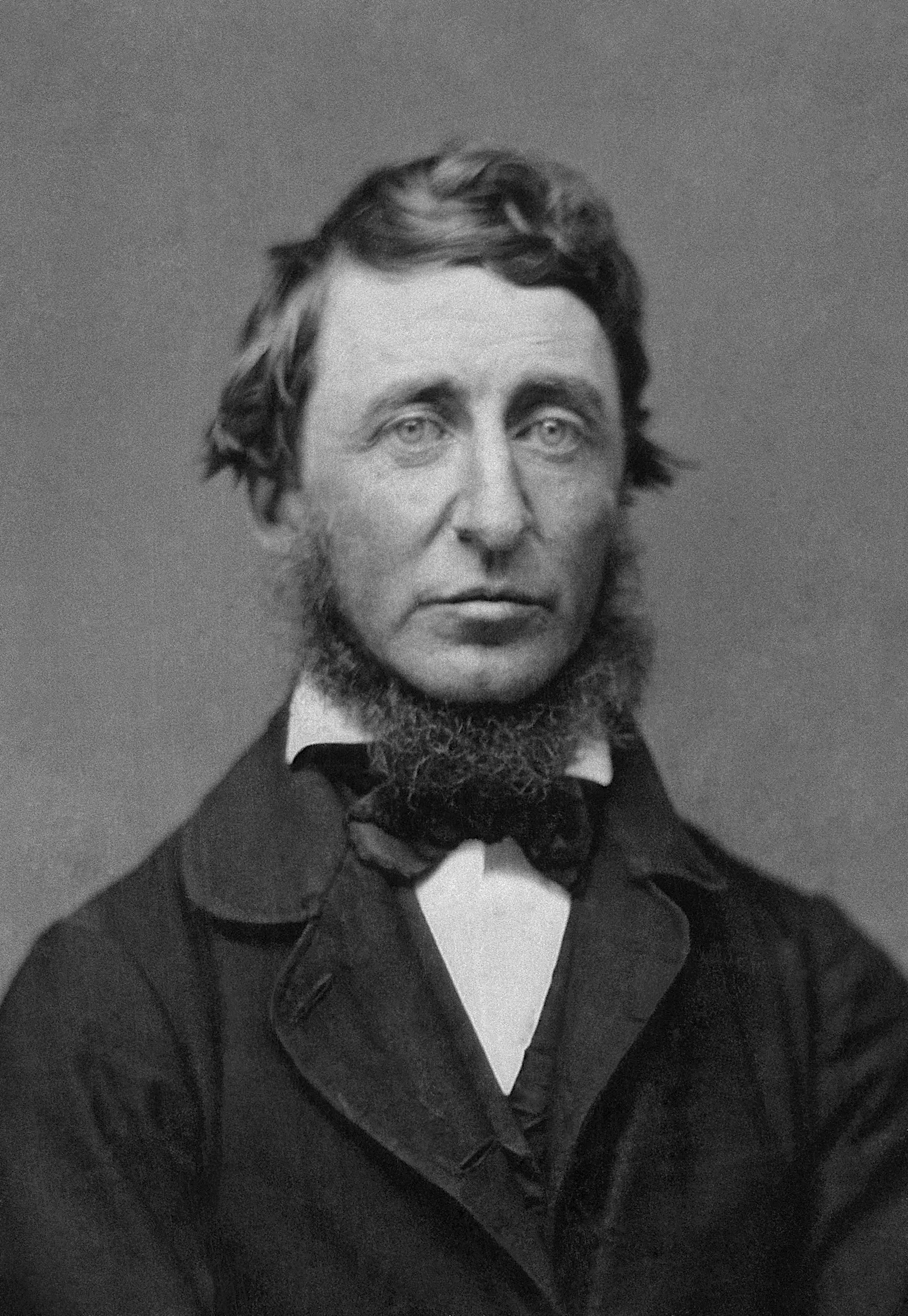
Henry David Thoreau

Henry David Thoreau (1817–1862) was an important early influence in individualist anarchist thought in the United States and Europe. Thoreau's essay "Civil Disobedience" (Resistance to Civil Government) was named as an influence by Leo Tolstoy, Martin Buber, Mahatma Gandhi and Martin Luther King Jr. due to its advocacy of nonviolent resistance. According to the Peace Pledge Union of Britain, it was also the main precedent for anarcho-pacifism. Thoreau himself did not subscribe to pacifism, and did not reject the use of armed revolt. He demonstrated this with his unqualified support for John Brown and other violent abolitionists, writing of Brown that "The question is not about the weapon, but the spirit in which you use it."

In the 1840s, the American abolitionist and advocate of nonresistance Henry Clarke Wright and his English follower Joseph Barker rejected the idea of governments and advocated a form of pacifist individualist anarchism. At some point anarcho-pacifism had as its main proponent Christian anarchism. The Tolstoyan movement in Russia was the first large-scale anarcho-pacifist movement. Violence has always been controversial in anarchism. While many anarchists embraced violent propaganda of the deed during the 19th century, anarcho-pacifists directly opposed violence as a means for change. Tolstoy argued that anarchism must be nonviolent since it is, by definition, opposition to coercion and force, and that since the state is inherently violent, meaningful pacifism must likewise be anarchistic. Ferdinand Domela Nieuwenhuis was also instrumental in establishing the pacifist trend within the anarchist movement. In France, anti-militarism appeared strongly in individualist anarchist circles, as Émile Armand co-founded Ligue Antimilitariste in December 1902 with fellow anarchists Georges Yvetot, Henri Beylie, Paraf-Javal, Albert Libertad and Émile Janvion. The Ligue antimilitariste was to become the French section of the Association internationale antimilitariste (AIA) founded in Amsterdam in 1904.

Tolstoy's philosophy was cited as a major inspiration by Mohandas Gandhi, an Indian independence leader and pacifist who self-identified as an anarchist. "Gandhi's ideas were popularised in the West in books such as Richard Gregg's The Power of Nonviolence (1935), and Bart de Ligt's The Conquest of Violence (1937). The latter is particularly important for anarchists since, as one himself, de Ligt specifically addressed those who lust for revolution. 'The more violence, the less revolution,' he declared. He also linked Gandhian principled nonviolence with the pragmatic nonviolent direct action of the syndicalists. (The General Strike is an expression of total noncooperation by workers, though it should be added that most syndicalists believed that the revolution should be defended by armed workers.)" The Conquest of Violence alludes to Kropotkin's The Conquest of Bread.

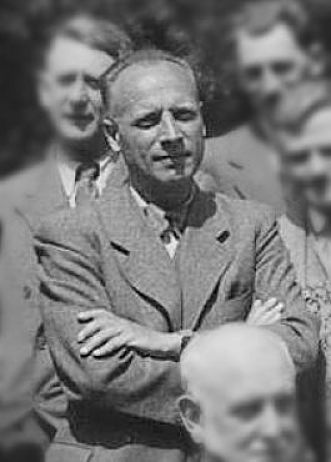
Bart de Ligt, influential Dutch anarcho-pacifist writer of the theoretical work The Conquest of Violence

As a global movement, anarchist pacifism emerged shortly before World War II in the Netherlands, United Kingdom and United States and was a strong presence in the subsequent campaigns for nuclear disarmament. The American writer Dwight Macdonald endorsed anarcho-pacifist views in the 1940s and used his journal politics to promote these ideas. For Andrew Cornell "Many young anarchists of this period departed from previous generations both by embracing pacifism and by devoting more energy to promoting avant-garde culture, preparing the ground for the Beat Generation in the process. The editors of the anarchist journal Retort, for instance, produced a volume of writings by WWII draft resistors imprisoned at Danbury, Connecticut, while regularly publishing the poetry and prose of writers such as Kenneth Rexroth and Norman Mailer. From the 1940s to the 1960s, then, the radical pacifist movement in the United States harbored both social democrats and anarchists, at a time when the anarchist movement itself seemed on its last legs." A leading British anarcho-pacifist was Alex Comfort who considered himself "an aggressive anti-militarist," and he believed that pacifism rested "solely upon the historical theory of anarchism." He was an active member of CND.

Among the works on anarchism by Comfort is Peace and Disobedience (1946), one of many pamphlets he wrote for Peace News and the Peace Pledge Union, and Authority and Delinquency in the Modern State (1950). He exchanged public correspondence with George Orwell defending pacifism in the open letter/poem "Letter to an American Visitor" under the pseudonym "Obadiah Hornbrooke." In the 1950s and 1960s, anarcho-pacifism "began to gel, tough-minded anarchists adding to the mixture their critique of the state, and tender-minded pacifists their critique of violence". Within the context of the emergence of the New Left and the Civil Rights Movement, "several themes, theories, actions, all distinctly libertarian, began to come to the fore and were given intellectual expression by the American anarcho-pacifist, Paul Goodman."

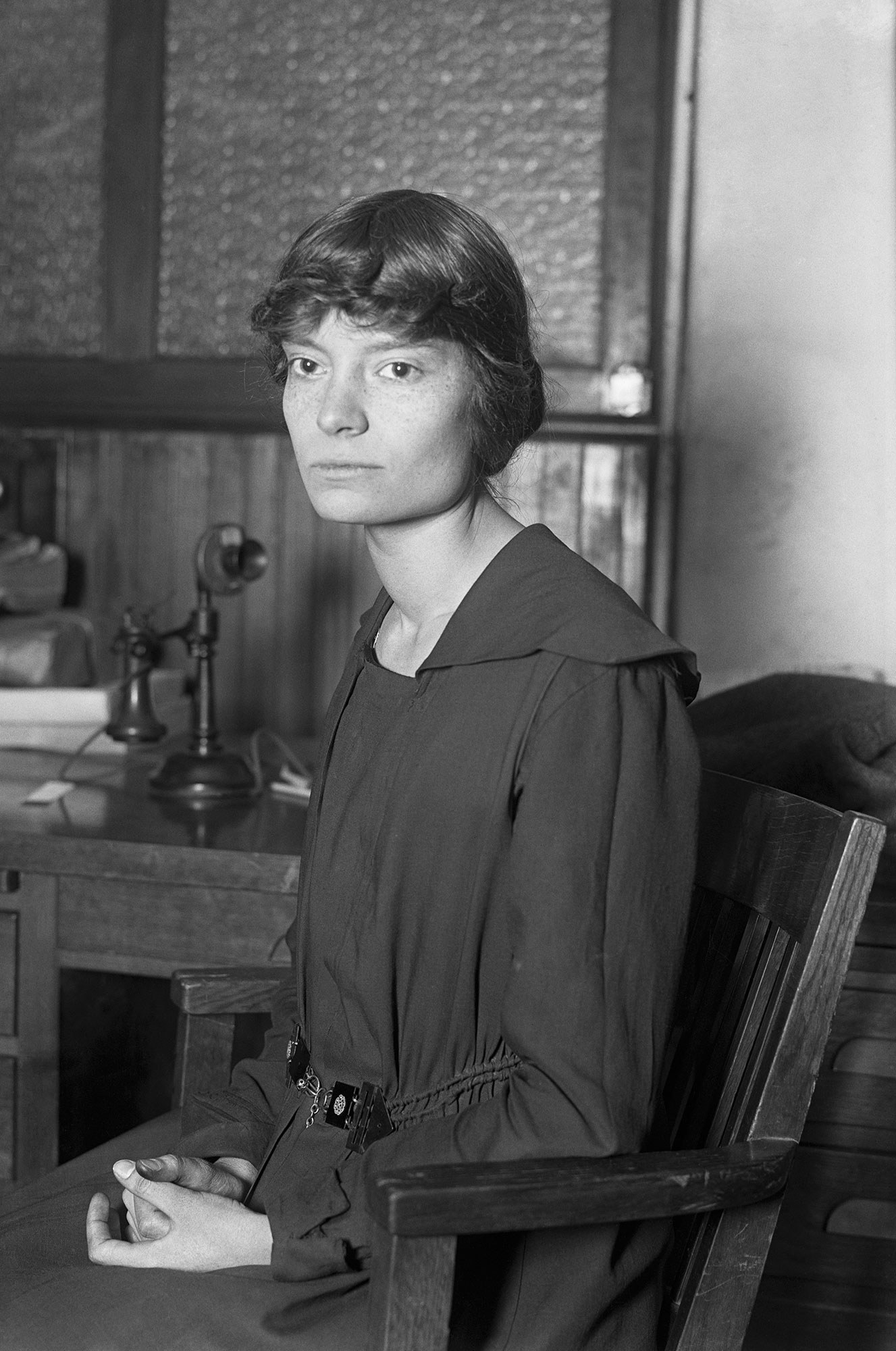
Dorothy Day, American Christian anarchist and anarcho-pacifist

Other notable anarcho-pacifist historical figures include Ammon Hennacy, Dorothy Day and Jean-Paul Sartre, albeit the latter only for a brief period between 1939 and 1940 . Dorothy Day, (8 November 1897 – 29 November 1980) was an American journalist, social activist and devout Catholic convert; she advocated the Catholic economic theory of distributism. She was also considered to be an anarchist, and did not hesitate to use the term. In the 1930s, Day worked closely with fellow activist Peter Maurin to establish the Catholic Worker movement, a nonviolent, pacifist movement that continues to combine direct aid for the poor and homeless with nonviolent direct action on their behalf. The cause for Day's canonization is open in the Catholic Church. Ammon Hennacy (24 July 1893 – 14 January 1970) was an American pacifist, Christian anarchist, vegetarian, social activist, member of the Catholic Worker Movement and a Wobbly. He established the "Joe Hill House of Hospitality" in Salt Lake City, Utah and practiced tax resistance. Charles-Auguste Bontemps was a prolific author mainly in the anarchist, freethinking, pacifist and naturist press of the time. His view on anarchism was based around his concept of "Social Individualism" on which he wrote extensively. He defended an anarchist perspective which consisted on "a collectivism of things and an individualism of persons".

Gérard de Lacaze-Duthiers was a French writer, art critic, pacifist and anarchist. Lacaze-Duthiers, an art critic for the Symbolist review journal La Plume, was influenced by Oscar Wilde, Nietzsche and Max Stirner. His (1906) L'Ideal Humain de l'Art helped found the 'Artistocracy' movement – a movement advocating life in the service of art. His ideal was an anti-elitist aestheticism: "All men should be artists". Jean-René Saulière (Bordeaux, 6 September 1911 – 2 January 1999), also known as René Saulière, was a French anarcho-pacifist, individualist anarchist, and freethought writer and militant who went under the pseudonym André Arru. During the late 1950s, he establishes inside the Fédération des Libres Penseurs des Bouches du Rhône, the Group Francisco Ferrer and in 1959 he joins the Union des Pacifistes de France (Union of Pacifists of France). From 1968 to 1982, Arru alongside the members of the Group Francisco Ferrer publishes La Libre Pensée des Bouches du Rhône.

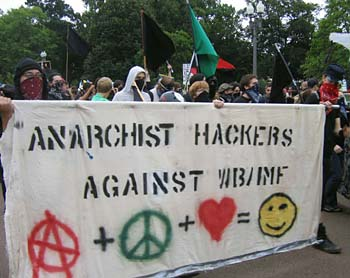
An anarchist protest, showing anarchist and pacifist symbolism

Movement for a New Society (MNS), a national network of feminist radical pacifist collectives that existed from 1971 to 1988, is sometimes identified as anarchist, although they did not identify themselves as such. For Andrew Cornell "MNS popularized consensus decision-making, introduced the spokescouncil method of organization to activists in the United States, and was a leading advocate of a variety of practices – communal living, unlearning oppressive behavior, creating co-operatively owned businesses – that are now often subsumed under the rubric of "prefigurative politics." MNS leader George Lakey stated that "anarchists claim me but I'm always a little surprised when they do because I'm fond of social democracy as it's been developed in Norway." Lakey has supported electoral politics, including the re-election of Barack Obama as U.S. president.

== Thought ==
According to the authors of An Anarchist FAQ, "the attraction of pacifism to anarchists is clear. Violence is authoritarian and coercive, and so its use does contradict anarchist principles... (Errico) Malatesta is even more explicit when he wrote that the "main plank of anarchism is the removal of violence from human relations".

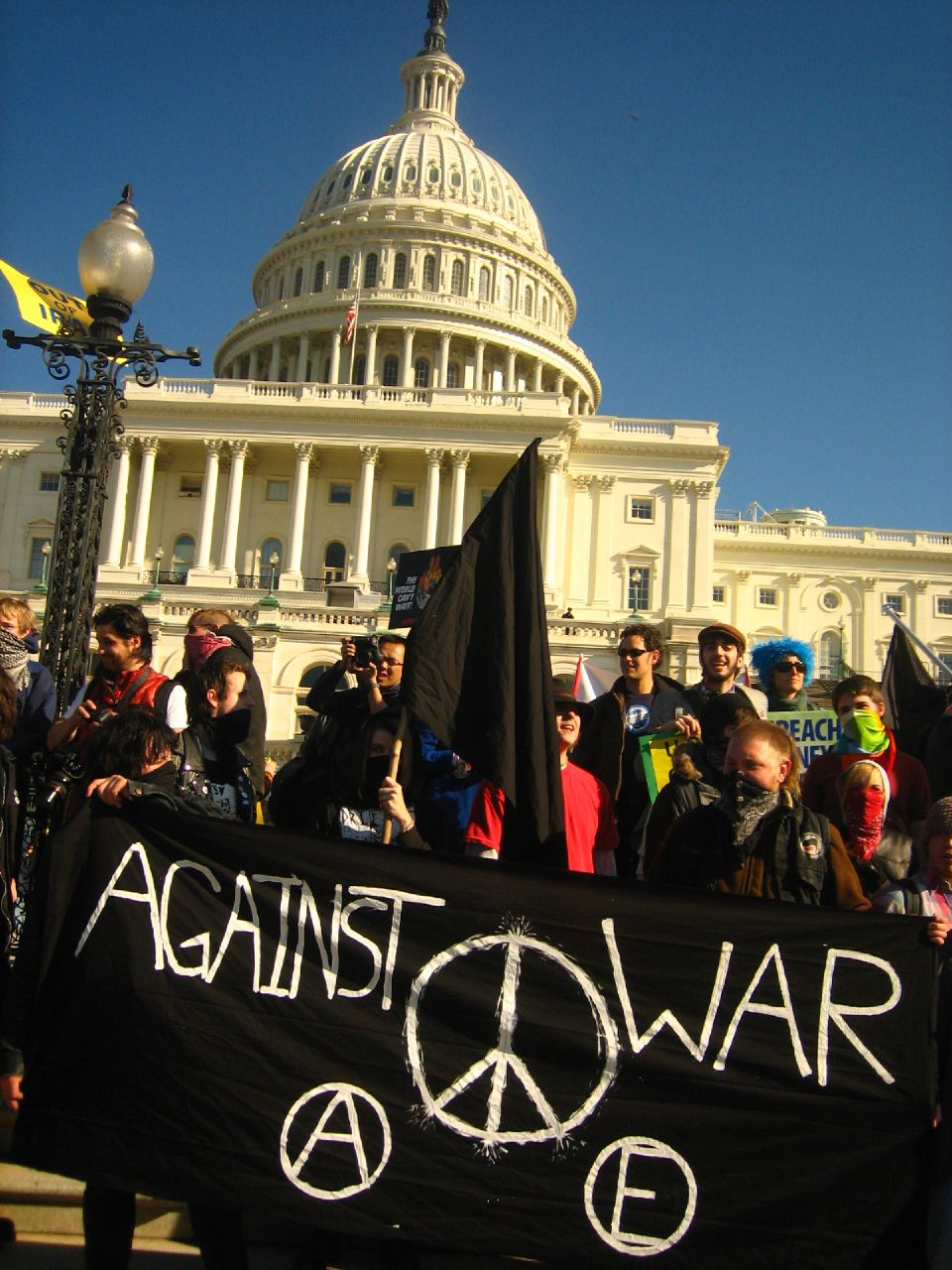
Anarchist anti-war protest in Washington, D.C.

Anarcho-pacifists tend to see the state as 'organised violence' and so they see that "it would therefore seem logical that anarchists should reject all violence". Anarcho-pacifism criticizes the separation between means and ends. "Means... must not merely be consistent with ends; this principle, though preferable to 'the end justifies the means', is based on a misleading dichotomy. Means are ends, never merely instrumental but also always expressive of values; means are end-creating or ends-in-the making".

An anarcho-pacifist critique of capitalism was provided by Bart de Ligt in his The Conquest of Violence. A report in An Anarchist FAQ describes how "all anarchists would agree with de Ligt on, to use the name of one of his book's chapters, "the absurdity of bourgeois pacifism." For de Ligt, and all anarchists, violence is inherent in the capitalist system and any attempt to make capitalism pacifistic is doomed to failure. This is because, on the one hand, war is often just economic competition carried out by other means. Nations often go to war when they face an economic crisis, what they cannot gain in economic struggle they attempt to get by conflict. On the other hand, "violence is indispensable in modern society... [because] without it the ruling class would be completely unable to maintain its privileged position with regard to the exploited masses in each country. The army is used first and foremost to hold down the workers... when they become discontented." [Bart de Ligt, Op. Cit., p. 62] As long as the state and capitalism exist, violence is inevitable and so, for anarcho-pacifists, the consistent pacifist must be an anarchist just as the consistent anarchist must be a pacifist".

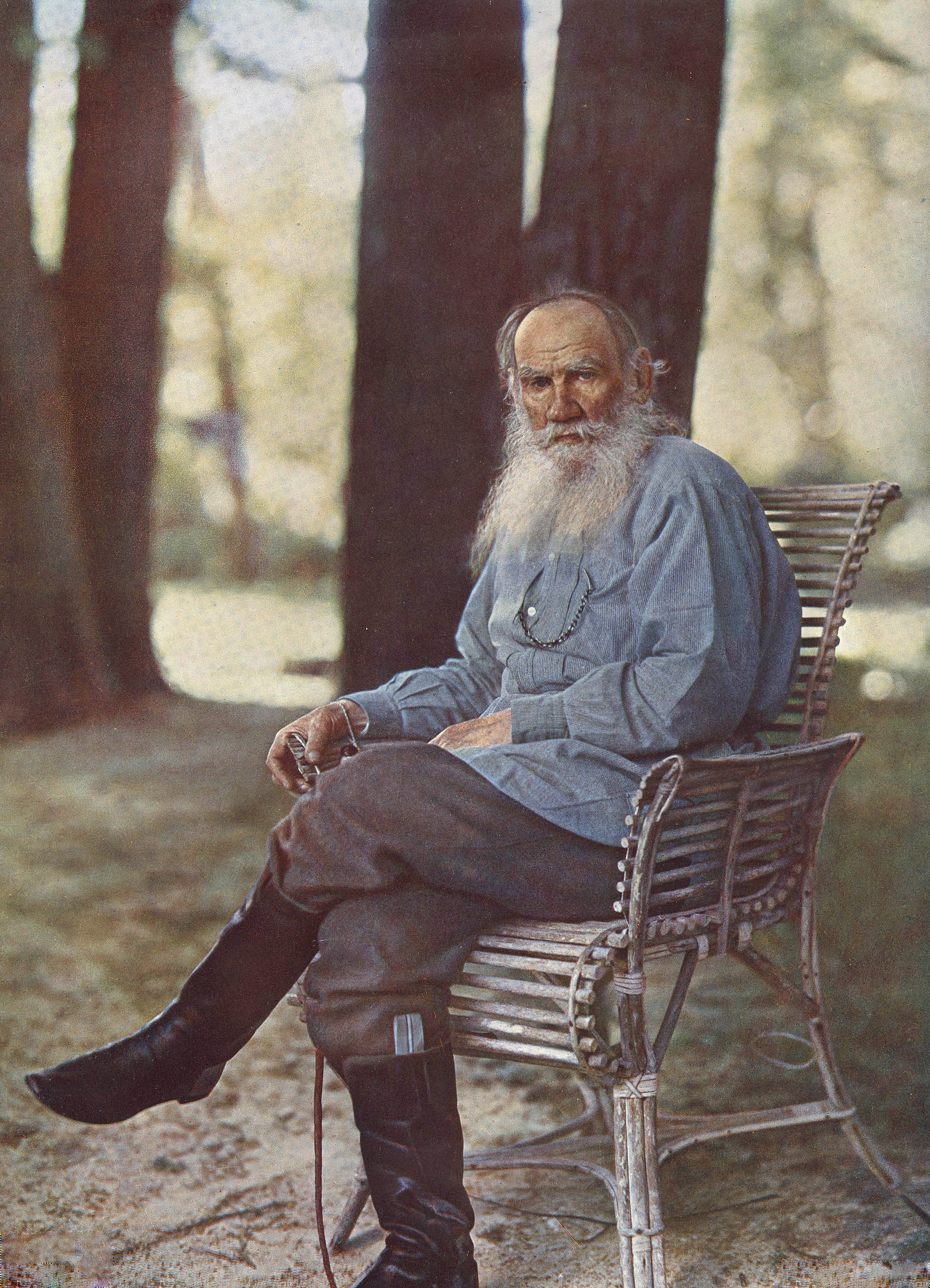
Leo Tolstoy

A main component of anarcho-pacifist strategy is civil disobedience as advocated by the early anarchist thinker Henry David Thoreau in the essay of the same name from 1849 (although Thoreau strongly supported the gun rights and self-defense). Leo Tolstoy was influenced by it and he saw that a "great weapon for undermining (rather than overthrowing) the state was the refusal by individuals to cooperate with it and obey its immoral demands". Also the concepts of passive and active resistance have relevance as they were developed later by Mohandas Gandhi.

For anarchist historian George Woodcock, "the modern pacifist anarchists, ... have tended to concentrate their attention largely on the creation of libertarian communities – particularly farming communities – within present society, as a kind of peaceful version of the propaganda by deed. They divide, however, over the question of action." Anarcho-pacifists can even accept "the principle of resistance and even revolutionary action (nonviolent revolution), provided it does not incur violence, which they see as a form of power and therefore nonanarchist in nature. This change in attitude has led the pacifist anarchists to veer toward the anarcho-syndicalists, since the latter's concept of the general strike as the great revolutionary weapon made an appeal to those pacifists who accepted the need for fundamental social change but did not wish to compromise their ideal by the use of negative (i.e., violent) means."

== Ideological variance ==
Similarity between the symbols of anarchism and peace

Anarcho-pacifism is frequently associated with various forms of religious anarchism such as Tolstoyan Christian anarchism and Buddhist anarchism. Notably, Christian anarchism places emphasis on Jesus Christ's blessing of peacemakers and teachings involving non-violent resistance. Concerning the anarchistic characteristics of Christianity, Greek author Alexandre Christoyannopoulos argues that the concept of the state should be rejected by Christians due to its inherent contradiction of the teachings of the religion. Following the definition of the state posited by Max Weber in his 1921 essay Politik als Beruf, Christoyannopoulos contends that the state is founded upon a monopoly over the use of violent force in order to enforce law and order, and is therefore directly at odds with the fundamental teachings of Jesus Christ. Reflecting on the implications of this contradictory relationship, Christoyannopoulos invokes the Tolstoyan notion that the force utilized by the justice system to enforce the outcomes of legal proceedings is also at odds with the teachings of Christianity. Aylmer Maude (the friend, biographer and translator of Leo Tolstoy) states that Christianity involves anarchism as it necessitates the "abolition of all compulsory legislation, law courts, police, and prisons, as well as all forcible restraint of man by man". Due to Tolstoy's religious views combined with his advocacy for the total dismantlement of the state and its apparatus in favour of the establishment of a voluntarist society, he is seen as a prominent instigator of Christian anarchism.

Anarcho-pacifism is often combined with socialist criticism of capitalism regarding economic class. The anarcho-pacifist ideal of a peaceful classless society is claimed to be incompatible with the competitive nature of capitalism which can ultimately lead to violent conflict. Anarcho-pacifists frequently denounce the perceived tendency of the capitalist economic system to perpetuate systematic violence in the forms of exploitation, hierarchies of political and economic power as well as dispossession. However, the socialist criticism of capitalism that often appear within the movement does not imply that anarcho-pacifism is inherently social anarchist in nature. Anarchist schools of thought can be generally distinguished from one another by their perspectives on two key elements, namely revolutionary methods and economic organisation. Anarcho-pacifism differs from social anarchism in rejecting the use of violent revolutionary methods to achieve social change and the abolition of the state.

Irreligious or even anti-religious tendencies have emerged such as the French individualist anarchist anarcho-pacifist tendency exemplified by authors and activists such as Charles-Auguste Bontemps, André Arru and Gérard de Lacaze-Duthiers which aligned itself with atheism and freethought. The anarcho-punk band Crass polemicised a variant of anarcho-pacifism whilst at the same time explicitly rejecting all religions, especially the symbols of establishment Christian theology. Opposition to the use of violence has not prohibited anarcho-pacifists from accepting the principle of resistance or even revolutionary action provided it does not result in violence. It was their approval of such forms of opposition to power that led some anarcho-pacifists to endorse the anarcho-syndicalist concept of the general strike as the great revolutionary weapon.

== See also ==
- Anarchism and violence
- Anti-war movements
- Libertarian socialism

== Bibliography ==
- Ostergaard, Geoffrey (1991) Resisting the Nation State: the pacifist and anarchist tradition
- Tolstoy, Leo. The Kingdom of God Is Within You.
