= Louis Louvet =

French anarchist writer (1899–1971)

Louis Alexandre Louvet
- Born: 7 February 1899; Paris, France
- Died: 15 March 1971 (aged 72); Paris, France
- Occupations: Tram driver, proofreader
- Known for: Anarcho-syndicalism

Louis Alexandre Louvet (7 February 1899 – 15 March 1971) was a French tram driver, proofreader, anarcho-syndicalist activist and anarchist. He wrote for many anarchist journals.

== Life ==
Louis Alexandre Louvet was born in the 2nd arrondissement of Paris on 7 February 1899. During World War I (1914–18) he was mobilized on 19 April 1918, and remained in the army until December 1919.

=== Inter-war period ===
As a young man Louvet drove an electric tram in Paris. In 1922 he joined the Young Socialists. In November 1924 Louvet became the director of Libertaire, the journal of the Union Anarchiste (Anarchist Union). In 1925 he founded the Fédération des Jeunesses anarchistes (Federation of Anarchist Youth), and from 1925 to 1926 published L'éveil des jeunes libertaires (The awakening of young libertarians). On 18 June 1925 he was charged as manager of Libertaire for an unsigned article published in January 1925 on La justice de Primo de Rivera. He was sentenced in absentia to six months in prison and a 200 franc fine for provocation to murder for the purpose of anarchist propaganda. Louvet left the Libertaire for La Revue anarchiste, and joined the board of the Librairie Sociale. In 1926 he was arrested for putting up posters against the Moroccan War. Due to disagreements over illegal activity, he left the Union Anarchiste.

Louvet married, but separated from his wife. From 1926 to 1947 Simone Larcher (1903–69) was his companion. They had one daughter. On 21 April 1926 he relaunched L'Anarchie, an individualistic anarchist journal which appeared until 1929. He was arrested on 20 July 1926 for distributing leaflets in support of Sacco and Vanzetti. On 27 June 1927 he was sentenced in absentia to four months in prison for inciting soldiers to disobedience. He gave himself up on 5 September 1927 and was placed in La Santé Prison. From 2–10 October 1927 he undertook a hunger strike in solidarity with the protestors who had been arrested for demonstrating against the execution of Sacco et Vanzetti. His sentence was remitted and he was released on 5 December 1927.

On 8 January 1928 Louvet was one of the founders of the Association des Fédérations Anarchistes (AFA, Association of Anarchist Federalists). From 1932 until the outbreak of war in 1939 he and his partner, Simone Larcher, devoted themselves to Les Causeries populaires (Popular Lectures). These provided a forum for free discussion and conferences which he chaired. He published a monthly bulletin of the Causeries populaires which became L'Action libre in November 1931 and then les cahiers libres d'études sociales controverse from January 1932. When the tram stopped operation in 1937 he began work as a proofreader, and became an active member of the proofreader's union.

=== World War II and later ===
Louvet was recalled to the army in September 1939 at the outbreak of World War II (1939–45), but was demobilized in August 1940. During the German occupation of France (1941–44) Louvet was vice president of the Association of Mutual Support of the Press, a clandestine organization founded in 1942. He held this position until November 1944, after the liberation of France. He helped Roger Monclin join the proofreaders union in 1943. After the liberation he resumed his activities as a militant anarchist, and with Charles-Auguste Bontemps created the journal Ce qu'il faut dire (CQFD). From June 1945 he was a member of the Mouvement Égalité (Equality Movement).

Louvet participated in the founding congress of the Anarchist Federation in Paris in 6–7 October 1945, which he joined in February 1946. In December 1946 he participated in relaunching the Confédération nationale du travail (CNT, National Confederation of Labor). In December 1953 he was involved with the reorganization of the Anarchist Federation. In 1957 he was on the staff of Le Monde libertaire. Louis Alexandre Louvet contracted cancer. He died on 15 March 1971 in the 13th arrondissement, aged 72. His ashes were placed in Père Lachaise Cemetery in Paris.

== Publications ==
Louvet wrote on subjects such as anarcho-syndicalism, the anarchist movement, free thought, anticlericalism, pacifism and neo-malthusianism in journals such as Le Libertaire (1924), L'Éveil des jeunes libertaires (1925), L'Anarchie (1925), La Revue Anarchiste (1925), Controverse (1932), Ce Qu'il Faut Dire (1944-1945), Les Nouvelles pacifistes (1949) and Contre-Courant (1951). He was also involved in various publishing projects. In November 1959 he started a "Biographical Dictionary of Pacifist Anarchist Pioneers and Militants", but it did not progress beyond the letter "B".

== Sources ==
- "Anarcoefemèrides del 15 de març: Louis Louvet". Anarcoefemèrides (in Catalan). 2015-03-15.
- "Louis Louvet". Ephéméride Anarchiste 7 février (in French).
- Maitron, Jean (2014). "LOUVET Louis, Alexandre". Les Anarchistes. Dictionnaire biographique du mouvement libertaire francophone (in French). Maitron/Editions de l'Atelier.
- "Roger Monclin". Éphémérides anarchistes (in French).
