= Roger Monclin =

French writer (1903–1985)

- Born: 31 January 1903; Reims, Marne, France
- Died: 26 July 1985 (aged 82); Saint-Laurent-du-Var, Alpes-Maritimes, France
- Occupations: Salesman, journalist
- Known for: Les damnés de la guerre

Roger Monclin (31 January 1903 – 26 July 1985) was a French militant pacifist and anarchist. In the inter-war years he edited the pacifist magazine La Patrie humaine (The Human Homeland). He is known for his book Les damnés de la guerre (1934) in which he shows the misery of ordinary soldiers during World War I (1914–18) forced to fight in impossible conditions.

== Life ==
Roger Monclin was born on 31 January 1903 in Reims, Marne. He left school early and became a traveling representative in perfumery. He met Victor Méric and joined the Ligue des Combattants de la Paix (League of Fighters for Peace) that Meric had founded in 1929. In 1931 he was among the founders of the pacifist and anti-militarist magazine La Patrie Humaine. He became the administrator of the magazine, and was joint editor with Robert Tourly from the death of Meric in 1933 until 1939. Monclin attacked militarism, arms dealers and crimes of military "justice" in speeches and articles. Thus on 14 December 1934 a conference was arranged on Les grands crimes de la justice militaire, with Louis Potiez as chair. Speakers included Monclin and Louis Loréal. The program was attached to a police report the next day.

Monclin's book Les damnés de la guerre (The Wretched of the War) appeared in 1934, one of a number of pacifist publications around this time. The book tells the stories of 17 conscripts who were shot during World War I.

In August 1939, a few days before the start of World War II (1939–45) Monclin and two friends left France for Belgium, and went on to Norway and Sweden. During the winter of 1939–40 they were hidden in a cabin in the forest by peace activists. Monclin was arrested in May 1940 and interned in a camp in Sweden until October 1942. He was allowed to return to Paris, where he suffered harassment by the police and the Gestapo. He joined the union of proofreaders in 1943 with the help of Louis Louvet, and worked in various jobs including journalism and as a street vendor. He was imprisoned from September 1943 to February 1944.

After the war Monclin wrote for the journal Défense de L'Homme and was an activist in the Union Pacifiste de France. He was among the founders of the Union Pacifiste de France in 1961, with Robert Jospin, Raymond Rageau, Louis Lecoin, Jean Gauchon and others. From 1968 to 1982 Andre Arru and members of the Group Francisco Ferrer published La Libre Pensée des Bouches du Rhône (Free Thought of the Mouths of the Rhone). Monclin was among the contributors to this journal, as were Charles-Auguste Bontemps and Giovanni Baldelli. Roger Monclin died on 26 July 1985 in Saint-Laurent-du-Var, Alpes-Maritimes.

== Publications ==
- Monclin, Roger (1934). Les damnés de la guerre (Les crimes de la guerre et de la justice militaire 1914-1918). Paris: Mignolet & Storz. p. 169. Reissued in 1978 by the Union Pacifiste de France
- Monclin, Roger (1934). Les crimes des conseils de guerre.
- Monclin, Roger (1962). Gaston Couté: (1880-1911) poète maudit. Pensée et action. p. 51.

== See also ==
- List of peace activists

== Sources ==
- Burget, René (2013-12-16). "Fusillés pour l'exemple". Union Pacifiste de France.
- "Courte biographie (2ème partie)". Raforum.info. Archived from the original on 2014-01-01.
- Maitron, J. (1997). "MONCLIN Roger". Dictionnaire biographique du mouvement ouvrier français (in French). Éditions de l'Atelier.
- Offenstadt, Nicolas (January–March 1997). "Construction d'une "grande cause": la réhabilitation des "fusillés pour l'exemple" de la grande guerre". Revue d'histoire moderne et contemporaine. 44e (1). Societe d'Histoire Moderne et Contemporaine: 68–85. doi:10.3406/rhmc.1997.1854. JSTOR 20530221.
- Offenstadt, Nicolas (2009). Les fusillés de la Grande guerre et la mémoire collective, 1914-2009. Odile Jacob. ISBN 978-2-7381-2352-7.
- "Roger Monclin". Éphémérides anarchistes.
