= Jean-René Saulière =

French anarchist (1911–1999)

Jean-René Saulière (also René Saulière) (Bordeaux, 6 September 1911 – 2 January 1999) was a French anarcho-pacifist, individualist anarchist and freethought writer and militant who went under the pseudonym André Arru.

== Biography ==
Arru was born in Bordeaux on 6 September 1911. In 1914 his family moves to Paris. When he was 20 years old he entered obligatory military service with anti-militarist positions. In 1933 he assists to a conference by prominent French orator and militant Sébastien Faure which he describes in his own words as a "revelation" and afterwards he embraces anarchism and starts to participate in anarchist groups. During 1938 and 1939, he participated in solidarity with anti-fascist sides of the Spanish Civil War, and in 1939, he started his activities as an orator and writer with a conference on Max Stirner and his book The Ego and His Own, an author which would influence his thought profoundly.

When World War II started Andre Arru went underground, changing his name from Saulière to Arru and moving from Bordeaux to Marseilles. He helped form an anarchist group alongside the prominent exile Russian anarchist Volin and participated inside the French resistance movement. After the war Arru became the general secretary for the French section of International Antifascist Solidarity. In the 1950s, he participated in the establishment of the francophone Anarchist Federation.

In addition to his pacifist militancy, he was an active organizer of the publications Libre Pensée and the quarterly review (1969-1980) La libre pensée des Bouches-du-Rhône. During the late 1950s he establishes inside the Fédération des Libres Penseurs des Bouches du Rhône, the Group Francisco Ferrer and in 1959 he joins the Union des Pacifistes de France (Union of Pacifists of France). From 1968 to 1982, Arru alongside the members of the Group Francisco Ferrer publishes La Libre Pensée des Bouches du Rhône. This publication included writings by authors such as Charles-Auguste Bontemps, Giovanni Baldelli, Jean Champagne, Jeanne Humbert, Albert Joël, Imbert-Nergal, Roger Monclin, Alain Kersauze, Albert Potvin, and Francis Ronsin.

Arru was a member, since 1983, of the organization ADMD (Association pour le Droit à Mourir dans la Dignité) (Association for the Right to a Death with Dignity) which campaigned for voluntary euthanasia. He ended his life voluntarily, at age 87.

== See also ==
- List of peace activists

== Bibliography ==
- Sylvie Knoerr-Saulière et Francis Kaigre. René Saulière dit André Arru, un individualiste solidaire (1911-1999). Marseille. Les Amis d’André Arru-Libre pensée autonome des Bouches-du-Rhône et Centre international de recherches sur l’anarchisme, 2004.
