= Robert Tourly =

French journalist, director of the French Communist Party and later a pacifist

- Born: 1888; Saint-Leu-d'Esserent, Oise, France
- Died: 1966 (aged 77–78)
- Known for: Director of the French Communist Party

Robert Tourly (1888–1966) was a journalist, director of the French Communist Party, and later a pacifist. He is known for his 1932 book on Adolf Hitler.

== Life ==
Robert Tourly was born in 1888 in Saint-Leu-d'Esserent, Oise. He joined the French Section of the Workers' International (SFIO) in 1911. In 1912, he contributed to the Prolétaire de l'Oise founded that year, and in 1913, he became editor in chief of Démocratie de l'Aisne. He served in the army during World War I (1914–18). In 1922, Tourly was elected to the managing committee of the French Communist Party (PCF: Parti communiste de France). He was expelled from the PCF the next year.

A reviewer said of his 1928 collection of journalistic sketches Le Conflit de demain : Berlin, Varsovie, Dantzig that it was "somewhat superficial, but lively and sincere." In the 1930s, Tourly was fully dedicated to pacifism, as were Madeleine Vernet and Théodore Ruyssen. He was among the members of the Ligue internationale des combattants de la paix (LICP) founded by Victor Méric (1876–1933) in 1931. He was known for directing La Patrie humaine (1931–39) with Victor Méric and Roger Monclin (1903–85). Tourly and Z. Lvovsky co-authored a short biography of Hitler in 1932, describing his nationalistic and anti-semitic agenda and analyzing his base of support. The authors called for discussion on reasonable changes to the Treaty of Versailles and for European economic union and disarmament.

Robert Tourly died in 1966.

== Publications ==
- Robert Tourly (1918). Les reflets : poèmes. Drawings by Mme Gross-Fulpius and John Mossaz (2 ed.). Lausanne: A. Lapie.
- Robert Tourly (1928). Le conflit de demain (Berlin-Varsovie-Dantzig). Paris: A. Delpeuch.
- Robert Tourly (1930). Maroc. Paris: Éditions du Tambourin.
- Robert Tourly (1931). Derrière les brumes de la Vistule. Paris: Éditions de la Nouvelle revue critique.
- Robert Tourly (1932). A travers la Russie nouvelle 1, Du Caucase à Moscou. Paris: Editions "Sirius".
- Robert Tourly; Z. Lvovsky (1932). Hitler. Preface by Pierre Mac Orlan. Paris: Catalogne.
- Robert Tourly (1932). À travers la Russie nouvelle: de Moscou au Caucase. Paris: Éd. Sirius, cop.

== Sources ==
- Dictionnaire biographique du mouvement ouvrier français. Les Editions de l'Atelier. 1997.
- Dreyfus, Michel (July–September 1988). "Pacifistes socialistes et humanistes dans les années trente". Revue d'histoire moderne et contemporaine. 35e (3). Societe d'Histoire Moderne et Contemporaine: 452–469. doi:10.3406/rhmc.1988.1459. JSTOR 20529381.
- Olivera, Philippe; Offenstadt, Nicolas (1993). "L'engagement pour la paix dans la France de l'entre-deux-guerres : un ou des pacifismes ?". Matériaux Pour l'Histoire de Notre Temps. 30 (30 S'engager pour la paix dans la France de l'entre–deux–guerres): 53–56. doi:10.3406/mat.1993.404094.
- "Reviewed Work: Le Conflit de demain: Berlin, Varsovie, Dantzig. by Robert Tourly". Journal of the Royal Institute of International Affairs. 7 (5). Wiley on behalf of the Royal Institute of International Affairs. September 1928. doi:10.2307/3015184. JSTOR 3015184.
- "Tourly, Robert (1888-1966)". Cgecaf.
- Winter, Calvert J. (January 1933). "Review: Hitler". Books Abroad. 7 (1). University of Oklahoma. JSTOR 40073680.
