= Bart de Ligt =

Dutch anarcho-pacifist and antimilitarist (1883–1938)

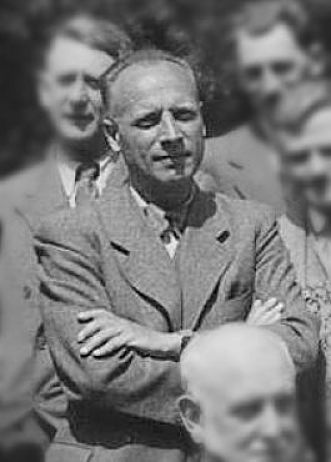
- De Ligt in 1938
- Born: Bartholomeus de Ligt; 17 July 1883
- Died: 3 September 1938 (aged 55); Nantes, Pays de la Loire, France
- Education: Utrecht University

Bartholomeus de Ligt (17 July 1883 – 3 September 1938) was a Dutch anarcho-pacifist and antimilitarist. He is chiefly known for his support of conscientious objectors.

== Life and work ==
Born on 17 July 1883 in Schalkwijk, Utrecht, his father was a Calvinist pastor. Following his father's footsteps, he became a theology student at the University of Utrecht. While there, he was exposed to liberal thinking and Hegelian philosophy for the first time. In 1909, became a member of the League of Christian Socialists. In 1910, he was appointed pastor of the Reformed Church at Nuenen, near Eindhoven in Brabant where Van Gogh's father had been pastor 25 years before.

=== First anti-war activities ===
In 1914, de Ligt joined fellow pastors A. R. de Jong and Truus Kruyt to write "The Guilt of the Churches", charging that the Christian establishment had been complicit in the events that produced World War I. Afterward, his writings became forbidden literature for the Dutch armed forces. His impassioned sermons supporting conscientious objection resulted in his being banned from those parts of the Netherlands considered to be in the war zone.

In 1918, he resigned as pastor declaring that, because of his increasingly universalist approach to religion, he no longer considered himself to be specifically a Christian.

=== Later activities ===
In 1918, De Ligt married the Swiss activist Catherina Lydia van Rossem, with whom he had a son. (Note: Catherina Lydia De Ligt-Van Rossem (1892 - 1970) later became known for translating the work of Jung and Sartre into Dutch. See Suhr, M. (2003). Sartre. Kopstukken filosofie [Notable people in philosophy] (in Dutch) (1st ed.). Lemniscaat. p. 200. ISBN 978-90-5637-501-0. and Bernardini, Riccardo (2011). Jung a Eranos: Il progetto della psicologia complessa [Jung to Eranos: The project of complex psychology] (in Italian). Franco Angeli. p. 248. ISBN 978-88-568-5012-3.) He was imprisoned in 1921 for organizing a general strike to gain the release of Herman Groenendaal, a jailed conscientious objector who had gone on a hunger strike. Later that year, he founded the IAMB (International Anti-Militarism Bureau). As he was becoming more involved with the work of the League of Nations, in 1925 he moved to Geneva, where he remained for the rest of his life. However, De Ligt became sceptical about the League's efforts, viewing it as how the colonial powers maintained an unjust world order. De Ligt instead regarded the Brussels Congress Against Colonial Oppression and Imperialism, held in 1927, as more representative of the world's population. At a meeting of the War Resisters International in 1934, he presented his now-famous "Plan of a Campaign Against All Wars and Preparation for War". (The full text of which may be found in The Conquest of Violence.) De Ligt also took a firm stand against fascism and Nazism in the 1930s. During the 1930s, De Ligt also promoted the ideas of Simone Weil.

De Ligt's ideas were especially influential in Britain; they strongly influenced the British No More War Movement. Writing in the pacifist magazine Peace News, playwright R. H. Ward praised De Ligt as "the Gandhi of the West".

De Ligt's last work was a biography of Desiderius Erasmus, whom Van Den Dungen argues De Ligt strongly identified with: "He recognized in Erasmus a kindred spirit who.. had fought,..not only against war and violence, but also for the idea of free thought and for the liberation of humanity".

In 1938, after a brief illness, he collapsed from exhaustion and died at the railway station in Nantes.

== The Conquest of Violence ==
The Conquest of Violence: An Essay on War and Revolution is a book written by De Ligt which deals with non-violent resistance in part inspired by the ideas of Gandhi, and details his rejection of antisemitism, militarism, imperialism, capitalism, fascism and Bolshevism. The Conquest of Violence drew on British philosopher Gerald Heard's idea that human aggression had become "a useless evil" with the advent of industrialized warfare. Anarchist historian George Woodcock reports that The Conquest of Violence "was read widely by British and American pacifists during the 1930s and led many of them to adopt an anarchistic point of view".

== Major writings ==
- The Conquest of Violence : an Essay on War and Revolution, introduction by Aldous Huxley; new introduction by Peter van den Dungen; translated by Honor Tracy from the French text revised and enlarged by the author. Pluto; Winchester, MA, USA : ISBN 1-85305-057-1
- La Paix Créatrice; Histoire des Principes et des Tactiques de L'Action Directe Contre la Guerre, 2 vols., Paris, Marcell Riviere, (1934).
- Erasmus, Arnhem, (1936).

== See also ==
- Anarchism in the Netherlands
- List of peace activists
