= Charles-Auguste Bontemps =

French anarchist (1893–1981)

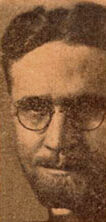
Charles-Auguste Bontemps

Charles-Auguste Bontemps (9 February 1893 – 14 October 1981) was a French individualist anarchist, pacifist, freethinker and naturist activist and writer.

== Life and works ==
Bontemps was born on 9 February 1893, in the Nièvre department of France. He collaborated in the anarchist publication Ce qu'il faut dire led by Sébastien Faure. After briefly joining the French Communist Party shortly after the ongoing October Revolution he joined the anti-militarist organization "Ligue Internationale des Réfractaires à la guerre". During the time of the Spanish Civil War he joined the "Solidarité Internationale Antifasciste".

He was an important personality in the foundation of the francophone Anarchist Federation. The new base principles of the Anarchist Federation were written by Bontemps and Maurice Joyeux which established an organization with a plurality of tendencies and autonomy of federated groups organized around synthesist principles. He also participated in the refoundation of the Anarchist Federation in 1953. Around 1967, Bontemps, alongside Maurice Joyeux and Guy Bodson on the Anarchist Federation's journal Le Monde libertaire, had an exchange of criticism with the members of Situationist International including Guy Debord.

He was a prolific author mainly on the topics of anarchism, freethinking, pacifism and Anarcho-naturism. His views on anarchism were based around his concept of "Social Individualism" on which he wrote extensively. He defended an anarchist perspective which was based on "a collectivism of things and an individualism of persons."

He died on 14 October 1981, in Paris.

== See also ==
- List of peace activists

== Writings ==
- L'Anarchisme et le réel. Essai d'un rationalisme libertaire, illust. d'Aline Aurouet, Les Cahiers francs, Paris, 1963, 185 p. [CCFR, CDA, CIRA-L, CP, IFHS, IIHS] [PDF 520 Ko]
- L'Anarchisme et l'évolution, éd. du gr. Maurice-Joyeux (FA), Paris, 1996, 31 p. [aCCFR]
- Les Artisans de l'avenir, éd. du gr. Maurice-Joyeux (FA), Paris, 1998, 15 p. [aCCFR]
- Attaqués par un loup (conte), illust. par R. Marmottin, Les Editions de l'âme française, Paris, 1946, 12 p. [CCFR]
- Ba-ta-clan : histoire de quatre ans en dix petites images d'Epinal, dessin hors texte de Germain Delatousche, Les Cahiers critiques et satiriques, n° 1 [pas d'autres numéros à notre connaissance], Paris, 1923, n.p. [56] [CCFR, CIRA-L, CIRA-M, CP, IFHS, IIHS]
- Carré d'as et oraisons, éd. Les Cahiers francs, Paris, 1976, 20 p. [CCFR, CDA, IFHS, IIHS]
- La Croyance en Dieu [aCCFR]
- Le Démocrate devant l'autorité, Les Cahiers francs, Paris, 1949, 93 p. [CCFR, CDA, CIRA-M, CP, IFHS, IIHS] [PDF 296 Ko]
- Destins (poèmes), illust. d'Aline Aurouet, éd. Les Cahiers francs, Paris, 1961, 102 p. [CCFR, CIRA-M, IFHS, IIHS]
- Deux conférences : Polyandrie et prostitution; L'Esprit libertaire, Contre-Courant n° 18, Paris, 1955, 46-XII p. [aCCFR, IFHS]
- Dieu et mon Roy, le pape contre Maurras, éd. de l'Epi, Paris, 1929, 62 p. [CCFR, CDA]
- Du soleil sur la route, poèmes satiriques, Les Cahiers critiques et satiriques, Paris, 1924, 73 p. [CCFR]
- Eloge de l'égoïsme, La Propagande par la brochure, Vieux-Vy-sur-Couesnon (Ille-et-Vilaine), 2000, n.p. [aCCFR, aIIHS, CIRA-L]
- L'Esprit libertaire, éd. Ce qu'il faut dire, Paris, 1946, n.p. [aCCFR, CDA, IIHS]; rééd. – Contre-Courant, Paris, 1951, n.p. [aCCFR, CP] – gr. Maurice-Joyeux (FA), Paris, 1996, 20 p. [aCCFR]
- Félix de la forêt, illust. d'Aline Aurouet, Les Cahiers francs, Paris, 1959, 116 p. [CCFR, CDA, CIRA-M, CP, IFHS, IIHS]
- La Femme et la sexualité, Les Cahiers francs, Paris, 1956, 288 p. [CCFR, IFHS, IIHS]
- Grappilles sur un fond d'individualisme social. Opinions et commentaires, illust. d'Aline Aurouet, éd. Les Cahiers francs, Paris, 1984, 103 p. [CCFR, CP, IFHS]
- L'Homme devant l'Eglise, cinq conférences polémiques sur l'Eglise et l'évolution, Les Cahiers francs, Paris, 1931, 212 p. [CCFR, CDA, CIRA-L, CIRA-M, CP, IFHS, IIHS]
- L'Homme et la liberté, Les Cahiers francs, n° 4, Paris, 1955, 204 p. [CCFR, CDA, CP, IFHS, IIHS] [PDF 500 Ko]
- L'Homme et la propriété, Les Cahiers francs, Paris, 1959, 94 p. [CCFR, CDA, CIRA-L, IFHS, IIHS] [PDF 364 Ko]
- L'Homme et la race, Les Cahiers francs, Paris, 1951, 91 p. [CCFR, CDA, CIRA-M, CP, IFHS, IIHS] [L'IFHS signale une autre édition : Lib. Claudian, Paris, 1951, 94 p.]
- Immanences (poetry), Les Cahiers francs, Paris, 1970, 92 p. [CCFR, CDA]
- L'Individualisme social. Résumé et commentaires, Les Cahiers francs, Paris, 1967, 45 p. [CCFR, CDA, IFHS, IIHS] [PDF 284 Ko]; rééd. gr. Maurice-Joyeux (FA), Paris, 1995, 15 p. [aCCFR]
- Intermittences, introd. de H. de Madaillan, La Goëlette, Paris, 1953, 117 p. [CCFR, CIRA-M, IFHS, IIHS]
- Les Majordomes du ciel, la congrégation et les droits de l'enfant, éd. de l'Epi, coll. Les Cahiers satiriques, n° 1, Paris, 1928, 63 p. [CCFR, CDA, CP]
- Marginales [« Soixante-cinq années de poésie »], illust. d'Aline Aurouet, introd. (posthume) de Henry de Madaillan, Les Cahiers francs, Paris, 1979, 316 p. [CCFR, CP]
- Miroir d'hommes. Notes à l'envers sous un angle d'individualisme social, Les Cahiers francs, Paris, 1972, 218 p. [CCFR, CDA, CP, IFHS, IIHS]
- Nudisme (pourquoi, comment), postf. de M.K. de Mongeot, 28 photographies, éd. de Vivre, coll. de la Libre Culture, 1930, 188 p. [CCFR, CP, IFHS, IIHS]
- Octogenèses (et) Florales (poésies), illust. d'Aline Aurouet, Les Cahiers francs, Paris, 1977, 82 p. [CCFR, CP]
- L'Œuvre de l'homme et son immoralité, éd. de l'Epi, Paris, 1927, 178 p. [CCFR, CDA, IIHS]
- Paganes (poèmes), illust. d'Aline Aurouet, musique de Germaine Bontemps, éd. Les Cahiers francs, Paris, 1962, 51 p. [aCCFR, IFHS, IIHS]
- Peut-on croire encore au progrès ? Controverse, n° 1, Paris, 1932, 64 p. [aCCFR, IFHS]
- Polyandrie et prostitution [aCCFR]
- Pro amicis, notes biographiques et correctives, préf. d'Aline Aurouet, Les Cahiers francs, Paris, 1974, 57 p. [CCFR, CDA, IIHS]
- Les Serfs du Vatican. L'Eglise contre le peuple. De Marc Sangnier au Père Philippe, éd. de l'Epi, coll. Les Cahiers satiriques, n° 2, Paris, 1929, 63 p. [CCFR, CP]
- Synthèse d'un anarchisme évolutif, Paris, 1952, 5 p. [aCCFR, IFHS, IIHS]
- Ton cœur et ta chair. L'amour et le mariage à travers les âges, dessins de Germain Delat

Presles, 1926, 223 p. [CCFR, CP, IIHS]

== See also ==
- André Arru
