= Cantons of the Marne department =

The following is a list of the 23 cantons of the Marne department, in France, following the French canton reorganisation which came into effect in March 2015:

- Argonne Suippe et Vesle
- Bourgogne-Fresne
- Châlons-en-Champagne-1
- Châlons-en-Champagne-2
- Châlons-en-Champagne-3
- Dormans-Paysages de Champagne
- Épernay-1
- Épernay-2
- Fismes-Montagne de Reims
- Mourmelon-Vesle et Monts de Champagne
- Reims-1
- Reims-2
- Reims-3
- Reims-4
- Reims-5
- Reims-6
- Reims-7
- Reims-8
- Reims-9
- Sermaize-les-Bains
- Sézanne-Brie et Champagne
- Vertus-Plaine Champenoise
- Vitry-le-François-Champagne et Der
