= Sous-préfecture de Reims =

Courthouse

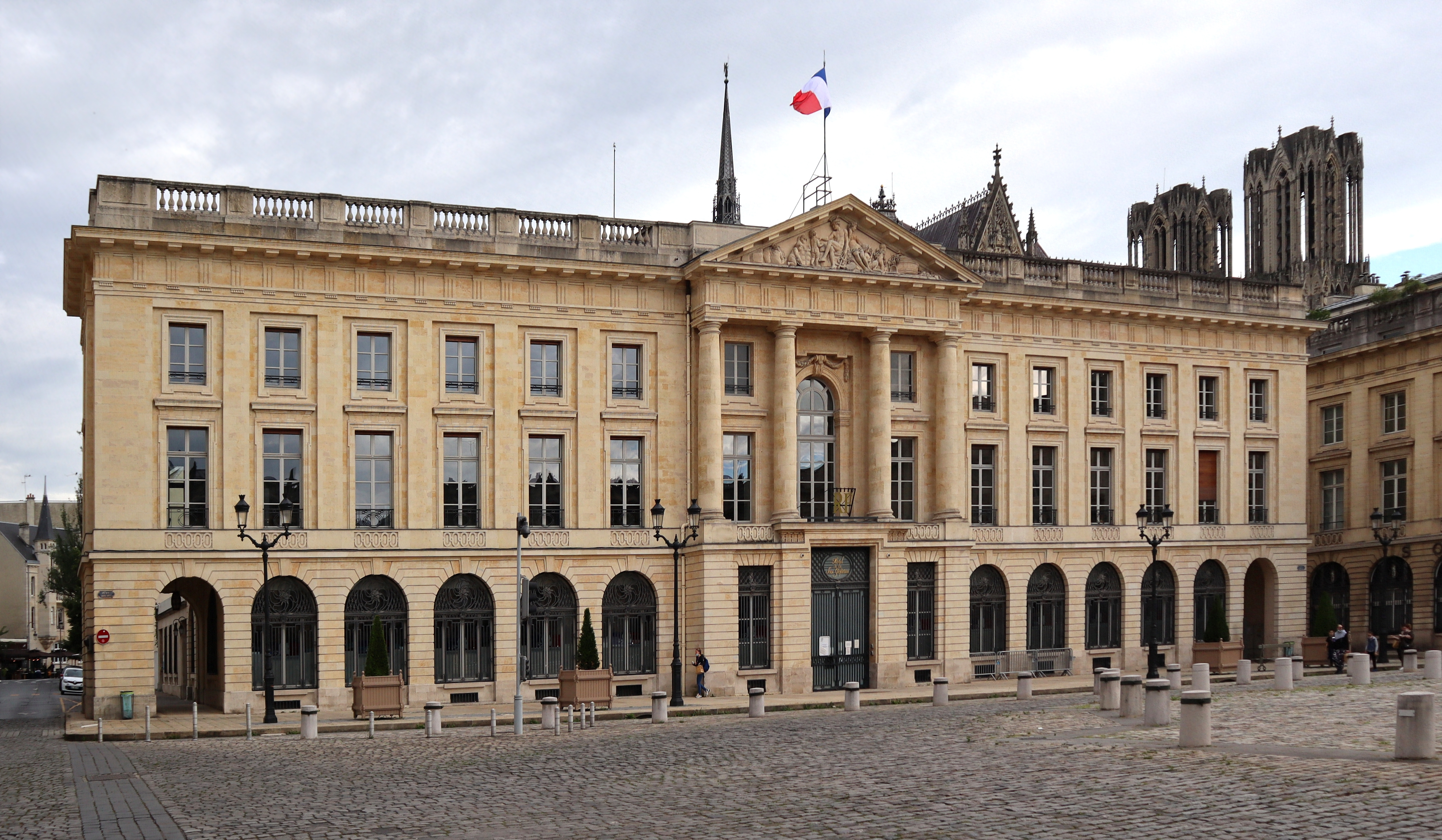
- Sous-prefecture of Reims or former customs house

General information
- Town or city: Reims
- Country: France
- Coordinates: 49.25527°N 4.03436°E

Design and construction
- Architect(s): Jean-Gabriel Legendre

Monument historique
- Designated: 19
- Reference no.: PA00078805

The Sous-prefecture of Reims, located at Place Royale, in Reims, France, is one of the three sub-prefectures of the Marne department, along with Épernay and Vitry-le-François. The building is also locally known as the former customs house. The façade and the roof of this building have been listed as a historical monument since 19.

== Location ==
The sub-prefecture is located in the city of Reims, overseeing the arrondissement of the same name, in the department of Marne in the Grand-Est region. The current buildings are accessible from Place Royale in Reims.

== History ==
In the 1740s and 1750s, Daniel-Charles Trudaine, Intendant of Bridges and Roads, wanted to relocate the seats of power in Reims to the future Place Royale and proposed the construction of buildings to consolidate the fiscal services in a "Hôtel des Fermes." The Customs and Aides were then grouped there.

Construction extended, along with that of Place Royale, from 1759 to 1761.

On October 23, 1792, a deliberation by the General Council decreed that symbols of despotism should disappear. The Hôtel des Fermes and the Hôtel du Commerce were placed on the list of national properties for sale.

The building was sold on February 8, 1791, to Mr. Henriot as National Property for 130,000 livres.

During the second half of the 19th century, several businesses moved into the building, alongside the Champagne wine merchant Henriot. In the early 20th century, the former Hôtel des Fermes housed the clothing store "Dewachter" and then a moving company. In the left wing, a "Customs Café" was established, along with a florist. After World War I, only the façade was still standing. The building had been burned by bombings. An inscription on the left of the central portico recalls this date. On January 25, 1930, the General Council of Marne decided to reconstruct the sub-prefecture in the customs house, Place Royale, with the restoration completed in 1936. In 1935, the building became the sub-prefecture of Reims. An inscription on the right of the central portico recalls this date.

In 1992, the sub-prefecture underwent a modernization of the reception hall, which involved setting up a single space for public reception and staff responsible for issuing permits.

Between 2010-2011, a renovation of the façades and roof, the listed parts, was undertaken under the direction of the DRAC.

From July 2010 to January 2018, works amounting to €4,200,000 (excluding VAT) were carried out to relocate the OFII within the premises of the sub-prefecture.

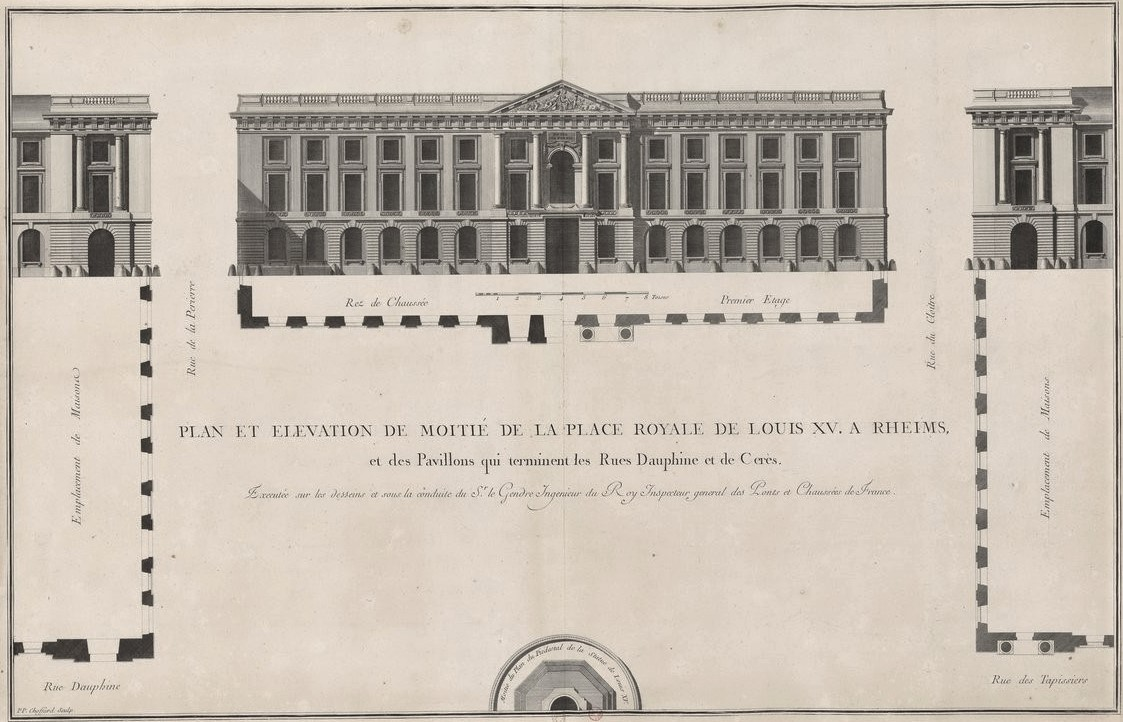
Jean-Gabriel Le Gendre's plan.

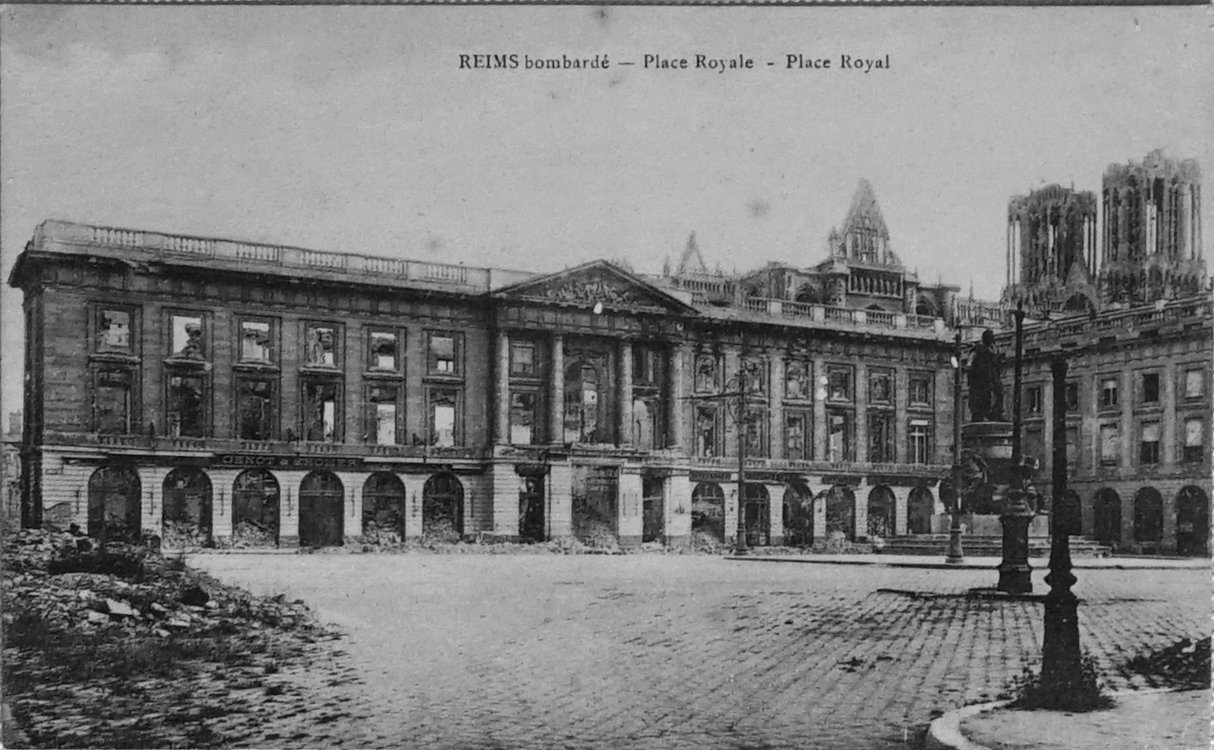
Facade at the end of World War I.

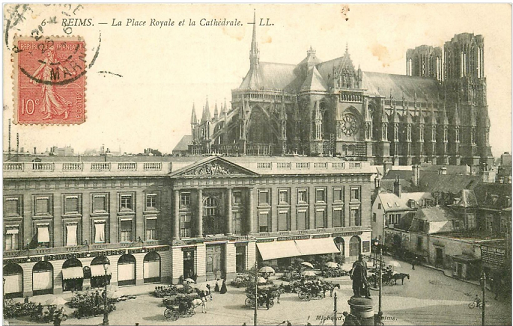
Former Customs House, current sub-prefecture.

== Description ==
=== The Building ===
The building is U-shaped with three levels. In its center, it is topped by a pediment by sculptor Louis-Philippe Mouchy.

=== Artwork ===
The pediment depicts Mercury, the god of commerce, surrounded by a group of children tying up bundles and rolling out Reims fabric.

Another group carries baskets overflowing with grape clusters.

A stained glass window on the theme of Franco-German reconciliation in Reims on July 8, 1962, was created as part of the 1% cultural program for the interior modification of the sub-prefecture from July 2010 to January 2018

It depicts German Chancellor Konrad Adenauer and French President Charles de Gaulle at the entrance of Reims Cathedral on July 8, 1962, during the symbolic mass of Franco-German reconciliation.

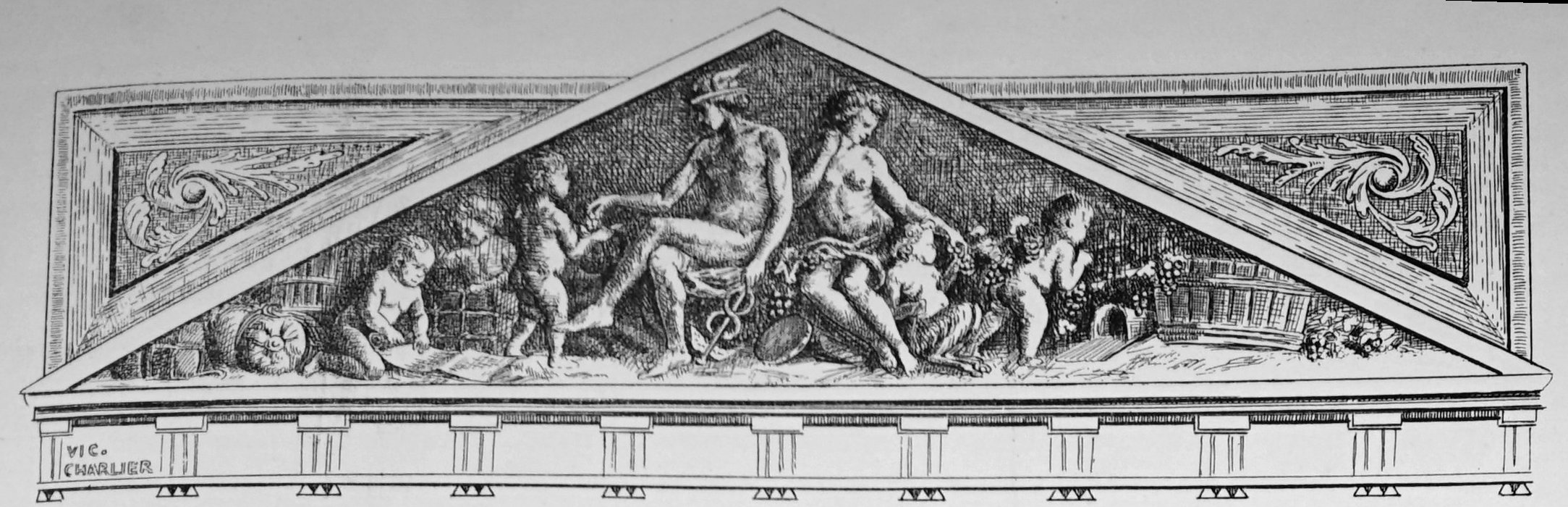
Tympanum of the former Customs House.
