= Rheims (disambiguation) =

- Rheims, former spelling of Reims, a city in France
- Maurice Rheims a French art auctioneer, art historian and novelist, born in Versailles
- Bettina Rheims, a French photographer born in Neuilly-sur-Seine

== See also ==
- Reims (disambiguation)
