= Reims (disambiguation) =

Reims or Rheims is a city of the Champagne-Ardenne région of northern France.

Reims may refer to:

- 12280 Reims, a main-belt asteroid
- Reims Aviation, a French aircraft manufacturer
- Stade Reims, a French football team
- REIMS, Rapid evaporative ionization mass spectrometry, an ionization technique in mass spectrometry
- REIMS, Remuneration of International Mails, an international postal charging system
- Reims-Gueux, a motor racing road course near the city.

== See also ==
- Battle of Reims (disambiguation)
