= Jean Lévesque de Burigny =

Jean Lévesque de Burigny (1692 in Reims, France – 1785 in Paris) was a historian.

== Career ==
In 1713, with his brothers, Champeaux and Lévesque de Pouilly, he began to compile a dictionary of universal knowledge, similar to an encyclopedia, which comprised twelve large manuscript folios, and afforded Burigny ample material for his subsequent works.

In 1718, at The Hague, he worked with Saint-Hyacinthe on L'Europe savante, in twelve volumes, of which he contributed at least one-half.

On his return to Paris, he devoted his time to historical research and published several works which stamped him as a conscientious scholar.

Burigny, although sharing the ideas of the philosophers of his time, was by no means an extremist. He was a modest, peace-loving man, whose only ambition was to be a scholar, and his works show a great amount of learning; some, for instance his lives of Grotius and Erasmus, give very interesting data not elsewhere found.

== Works ==
Among his works are:

- Traité de l'autorité du pape (Paris, 1782) which reduces papal authority to a primacy of honour
- Théologie païenne (Paris, 1754)
- Histoire générale de Sicile (The Hague, 1745)
- Histoire des révolutions de l'empire de Constantinople (The Hague, 1750)
- Traité de Porphyre touchant l'abstinence de la chair, avec la vie de Plotin (tr. from Greek; Paris, 1740)
- Vie de Bossuet (Paris, 1761)
- Vie du cardinal Duperron (Paris, 1768).
