= Jules de Saint-Pol =

French general

Jules de Saint-Pol (16 December 1810 – 8 September 1855) was a French general. His parents are Pierre, Count of Saint-Pol de Masles de SAINT-POL (1778–1851) and Marie Madeleine Eléonore Frederique du HAMEL de BREUIL de BRAZAIS (1786–1857). Jules was a former student of the Royal Military School of Saint-Cyr and was promoted in (1827–1829) in Athena. He was killed in the assault on Sevastopol on September 8, 1855; with a bullet in the heart by the brigadier General commanding the 1st Brigade of the 4th Division of the 2nd Eastern Army Corps. Jules de Saint-Pol is listed on the roll of honor of generals killed in the East, in the Hall of Marshals at Versailles where his bust was placed by order of Napoleon III.
