= Canton of Reims-6 =

Coordinates: 49.27°N 4.02°E

The canton of Reims-6 is an administrative division of the Marne department, northeastern France. Its borders were modified at the French canton reorganisation which came into effect in March 2015. Its seat is in Reims.

It consists of the following communes:

1. Reims (partly)
