= Place Royale, Reims =

Square in Reims, France

Place Royale
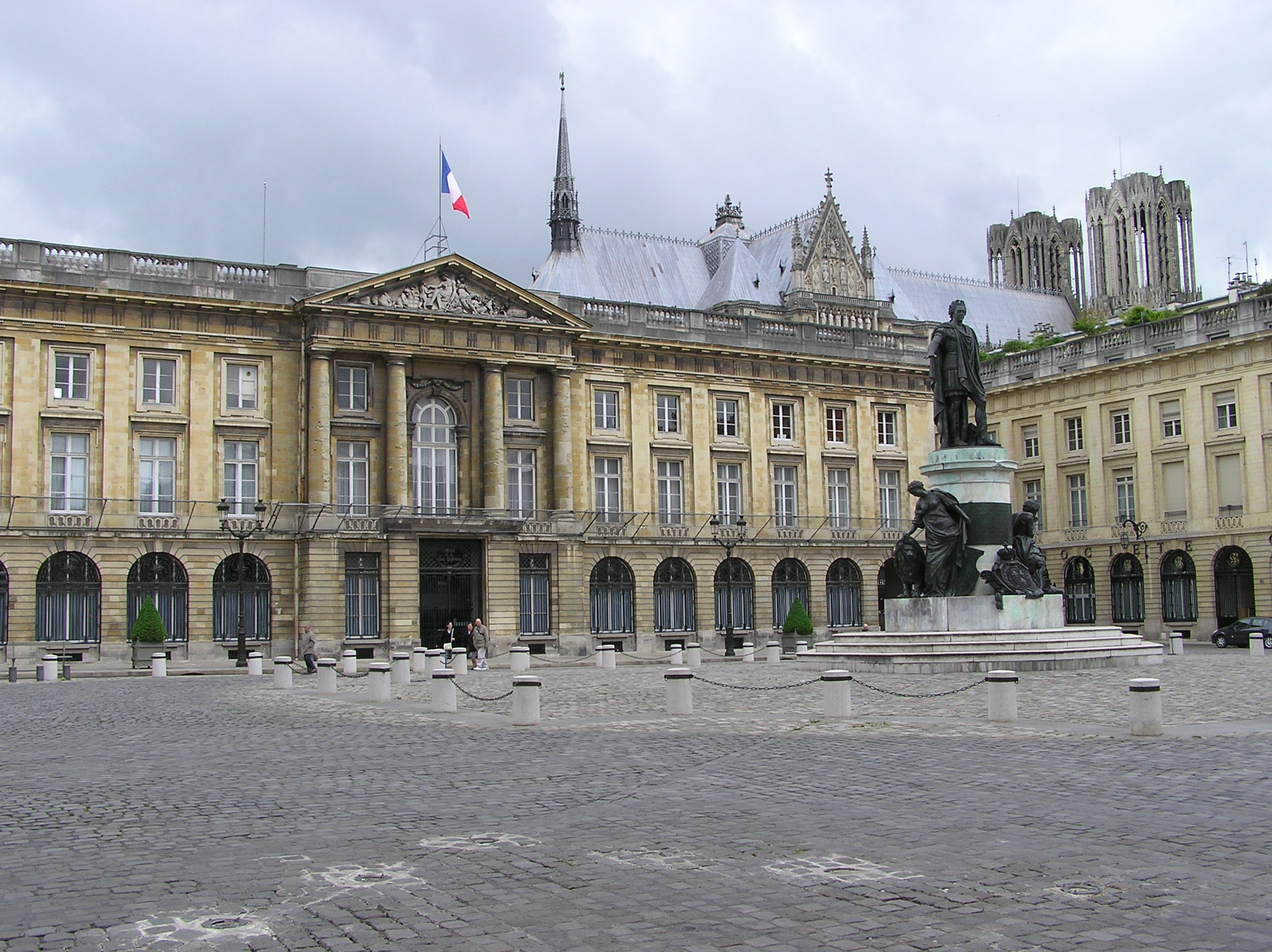
- North view of the Place Royale, with Reims Cathedral showing in the background
- Interactive map of Place Royale
- Coordinates: 49°15′20″N 04°02′03″E

The Place Royale (French pronunciation: [plas ʁwajal], meaning "Royal Square") is a square in Reims, France. A bronze statue of King Louis XV stands in its center, commissioned by the city from the sculptor Jean-Baptiste Pigalle and inaugurated on 26 August 1765, depicting "the sovereign in Roman garb, with laurels on his head and one hand extended 'to take the people under his protection.'"

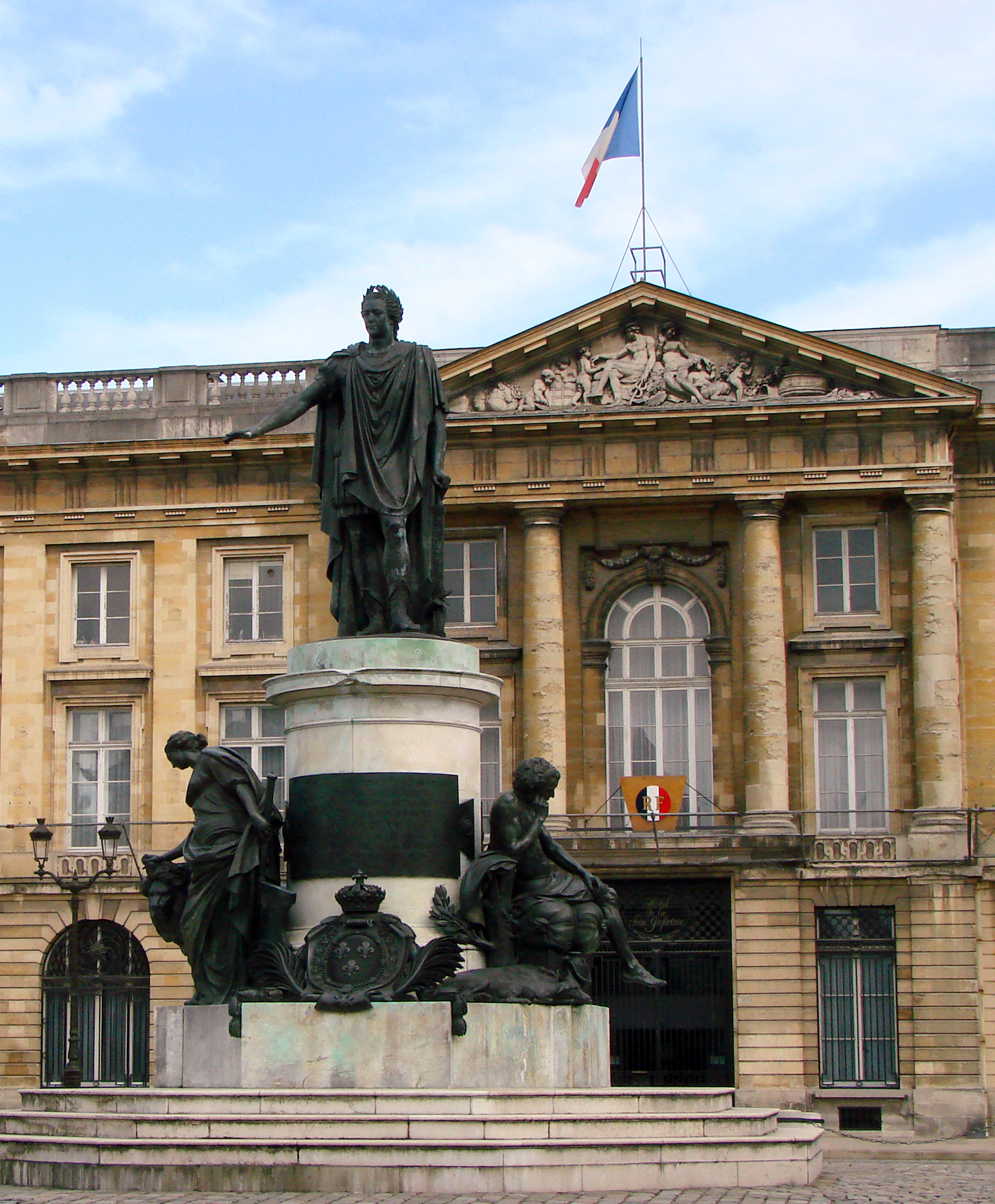
Monument to King Louis XV

The square is a monument historique of France.
