= Reims =

Subprefecture and commune in Grand Est, France

- Subprefecture and commune
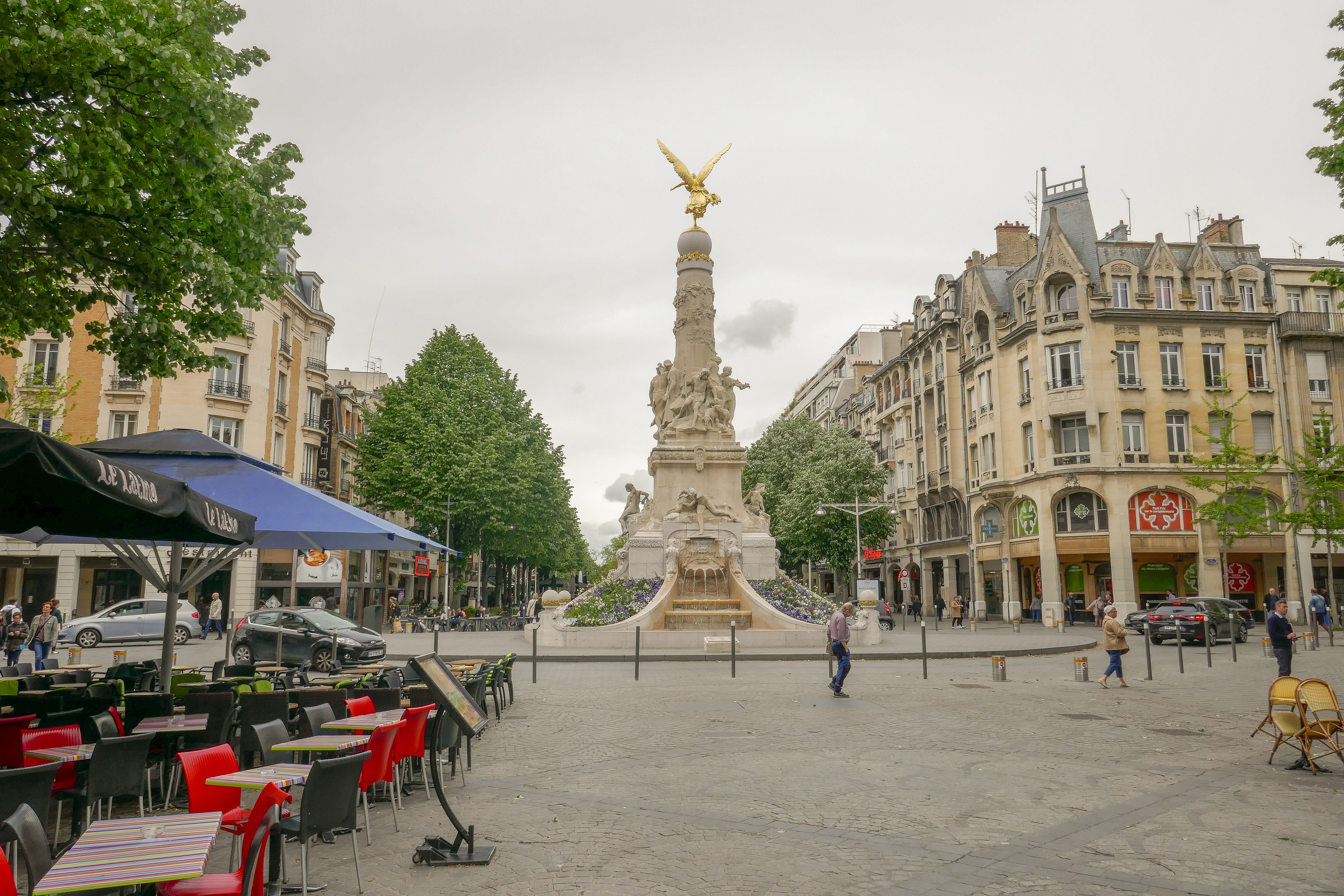
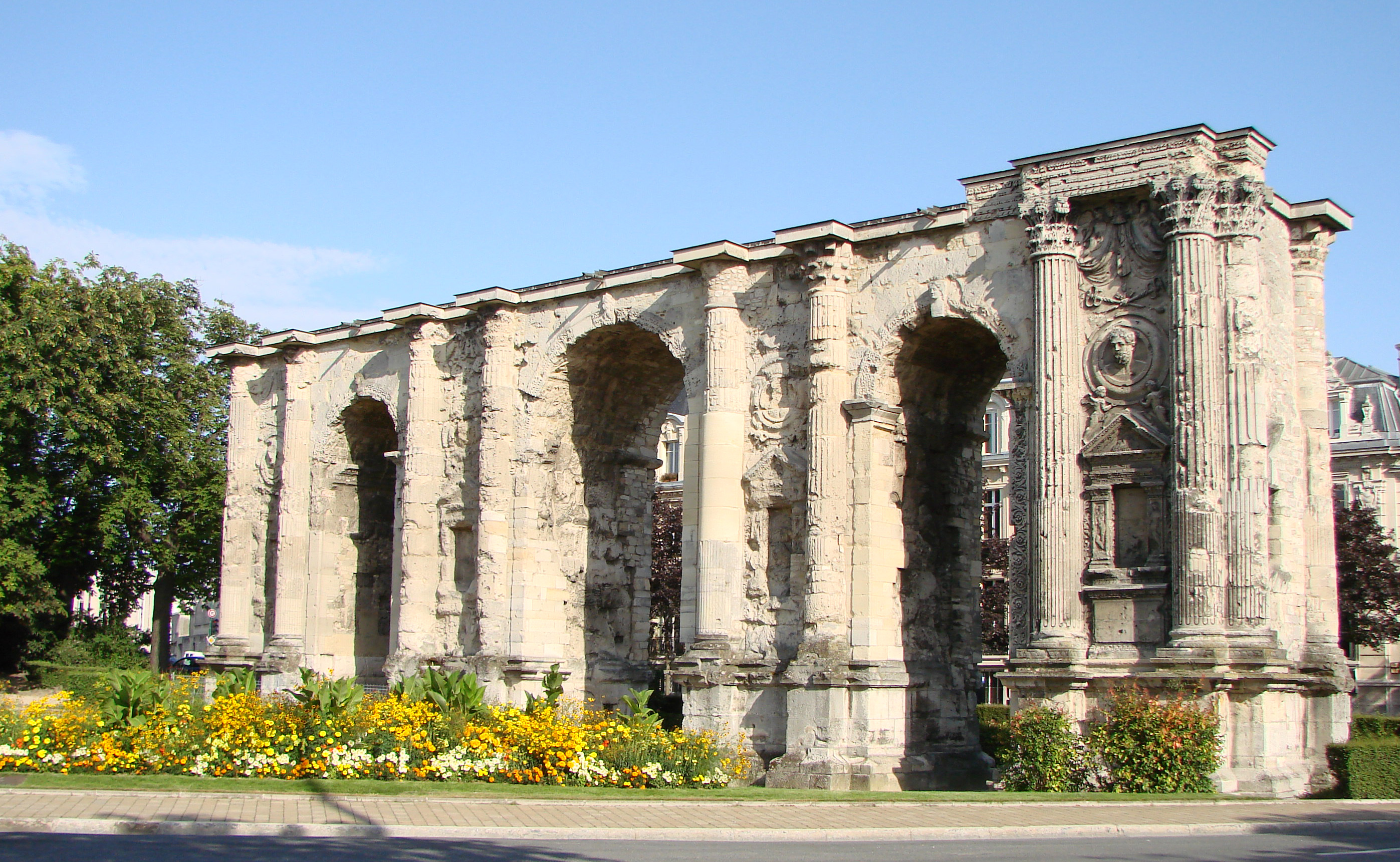
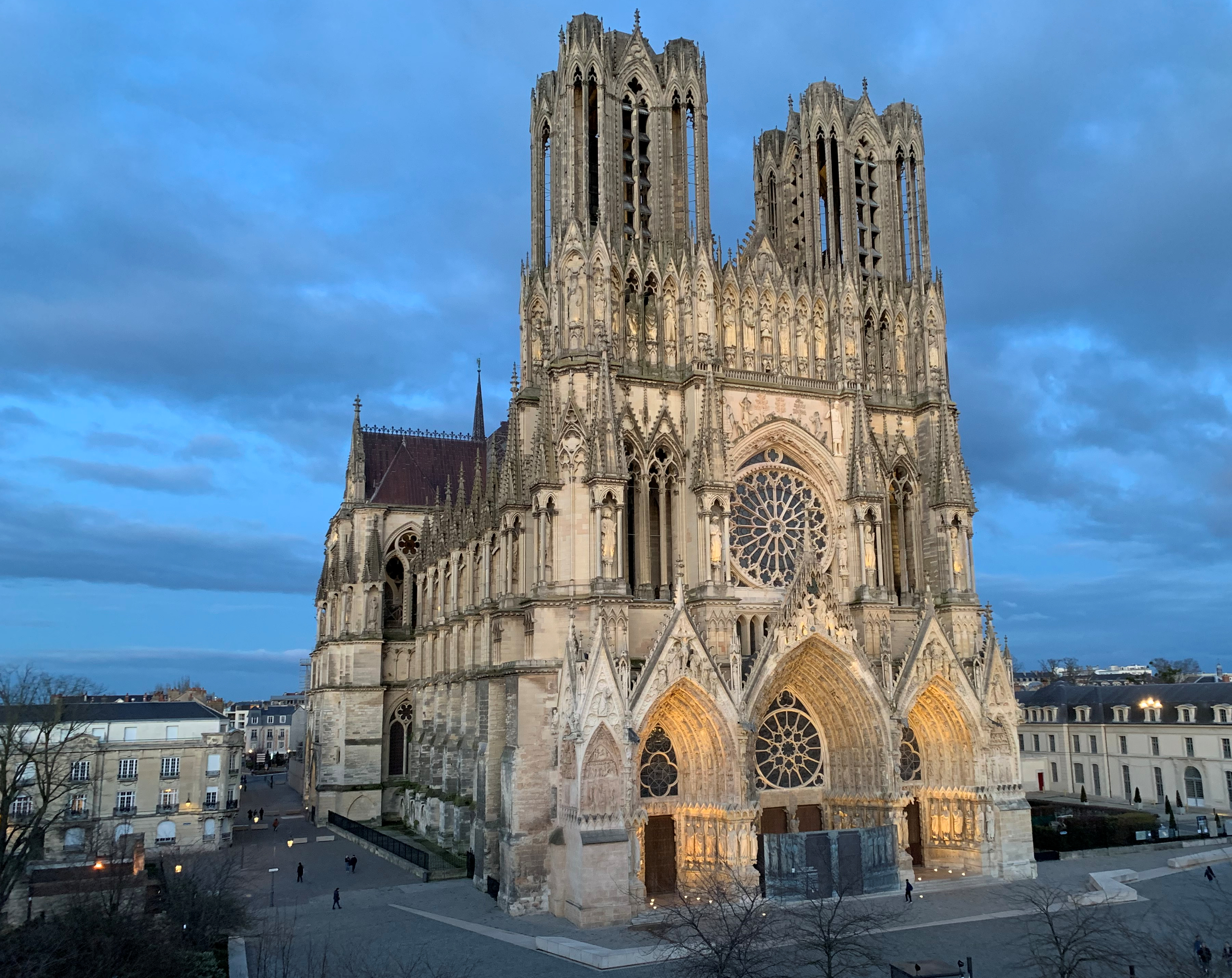
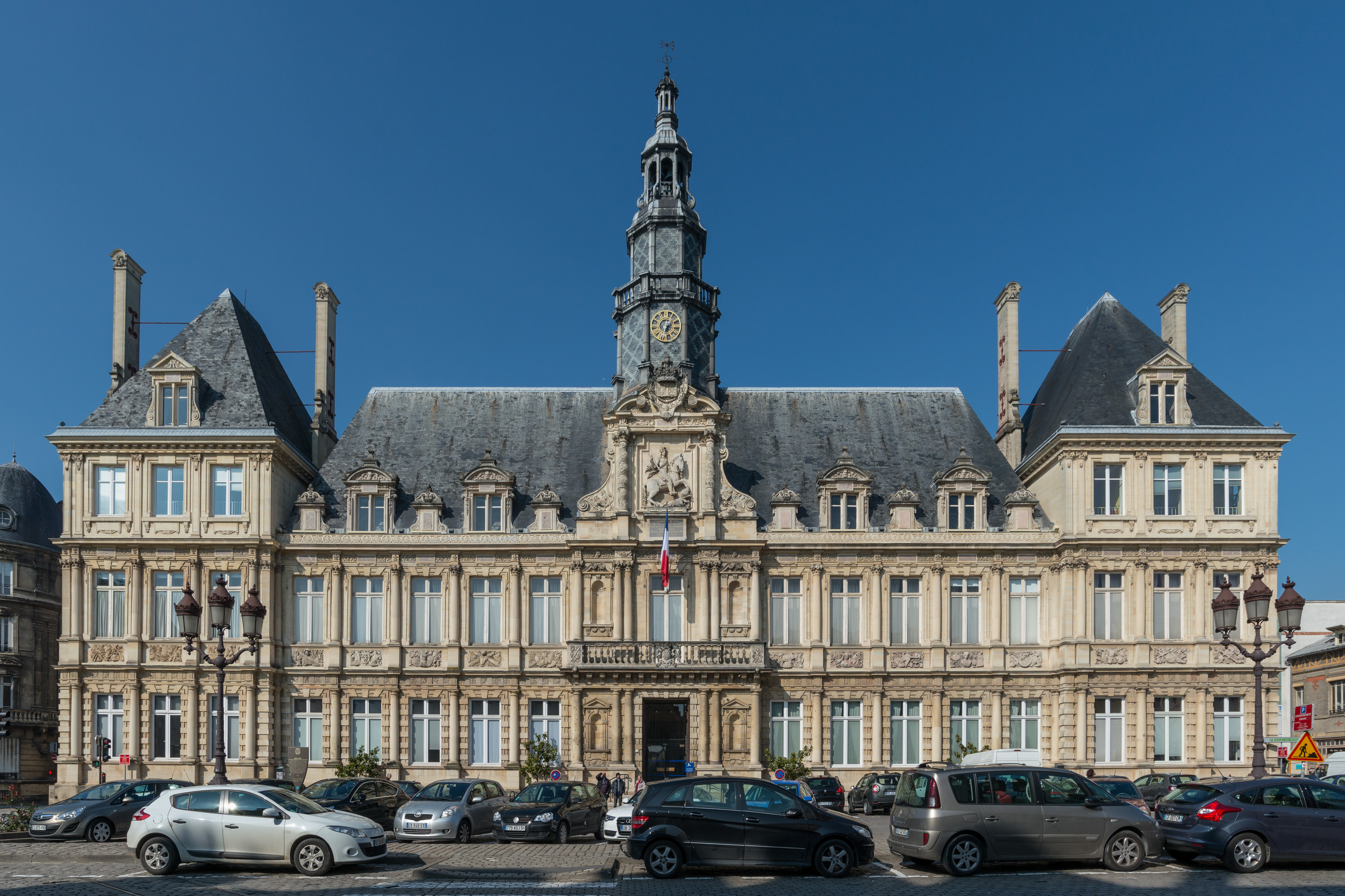
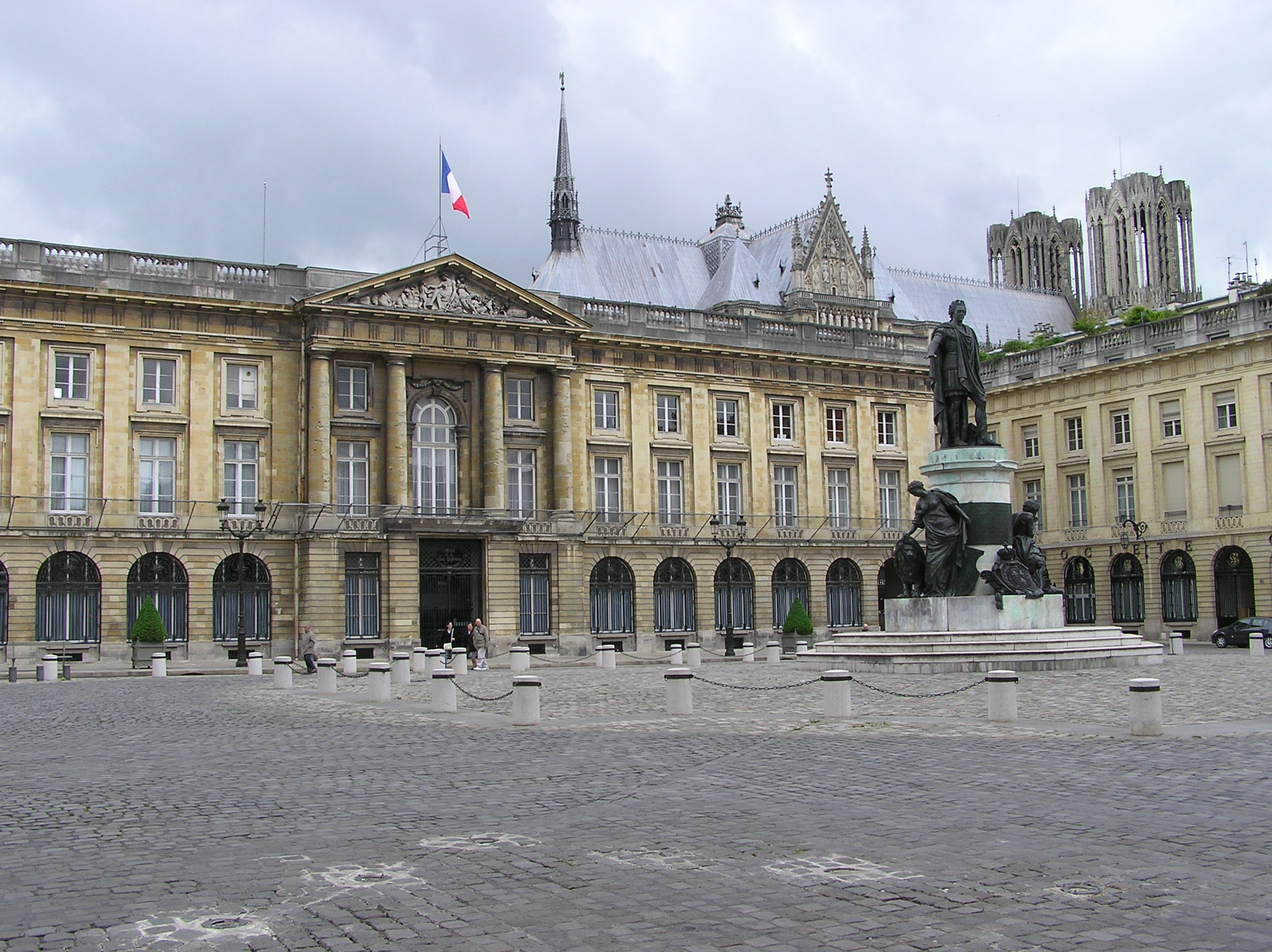
- Place Drouet-d'Erlon Porte de Mars Reims Cathedral Hôtel de Ville Place Royale

- Flag Coat of arms
- Location of Reims
- Location within France Location within Grand Est
- Coordinates: 49°15′46″N 4°02′05″E
- Country: France
- Region: Grand Est
- Department: Marne
- Arrondissement: Reims
- Canton: Reims-1, 2, 3, 4, 5, 6, 7, 8 and 9
- Intercommunality: CU Grand Reims

Government
  - Mayor (2026–32): Arnaud Robinet (DVD)
- Area^{1}: 46.9 km^{2} (18.1 sq mi)
- Highest elevation: 135 m (443 ft)
- Lowest elevation: 80 m (260 ft)
- Population (2023): 177,674
  - Density: 3,790/km^{2} (9,810/sq mi)
- Demonym: Rémois(e)
- Time zone: UTC+01:00 (CET)
  - Summer (DST): UTC+02:00 (CEST)
- INSEE/Postal code: 51454 /51100
- ^{1} French Land Register data, which excludes lakes, ponds, glaciers > 1 km^{2} (0.386 sq mi or 247 acres) and river estuaries.

Reims (/riːmz/ REEMZ; French: [ʁɛ̃s]; also spelled Rheims in English) is the most populous city in the French department of Marne, and the 12th most populous city in France. The city lies 129 km (80 mi) northeast of Paris on the Vesle river, a tributary of the Aisne.

Founded by the Gauls, Reims became a major city in the Roman Empire. Reims later played a prominent ceremonial role in French monarchical history as the traditional site of the coronation of the kings of France. The royal anointing was performed at the Cathedral of Reims, which housed the Holy Ampulla of chrism allegedly brought by a white dove at the baptism of Frankish king Clovis I in 496. For this reason, Reims is often referred to in French as la cité des sacres ("the Coronation City").

Reims is recognized for the diversity of its heritage, ranging from Romanesque to Art-déco. Reims Cathedral, the adjacent Palace of Tau, and the Abbey of Saint-Remi were listed together as a UNESCO World Heritage Site in 1991 because of their outstanding Romanesque and Gothic architecture and their historical importance to the French monarchy. Reims also lies on the northern edge of the Champagne wine region and is linked to its production and export.

== History ==
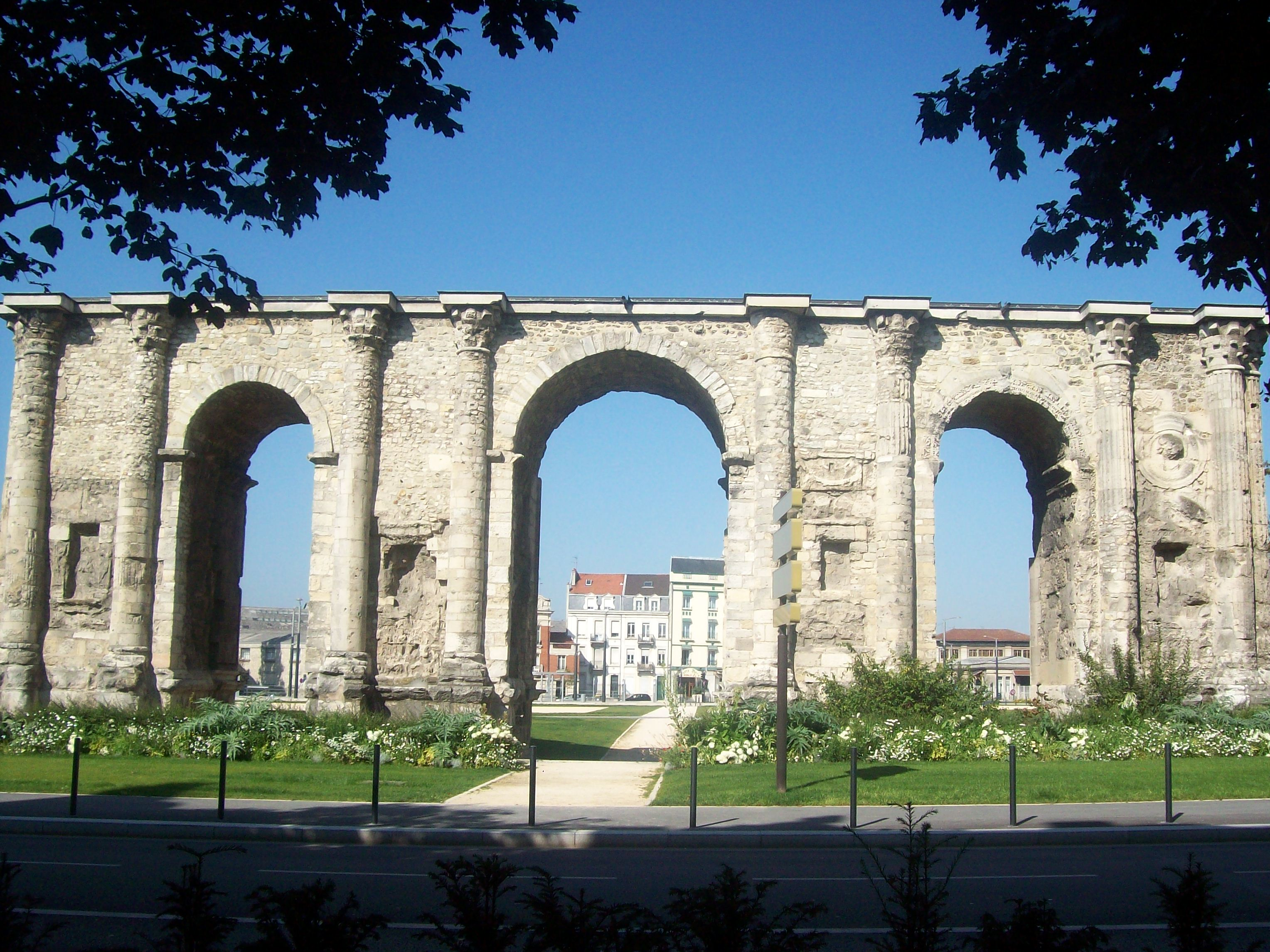
Porte de Mars, from the 3rd or 4th century

Before the Roman conquest of northern Gaul, Reims had served as the Remi tribe's capital, founded c. 80 BC. In the course of Julius Caesar's conquest of Gaul (58–51 BC), the Remi allied themselves with the Romans, and by their fidelity throughout the various Gallic insurrections secured the special favour of the imperial power. At its height in Roman times the city had a population in the range of 30,000–50,000 or perhaps up to 100,000. Reims was first called Durocortorum in Latin, which is hypothesized to derive from a Gaulish name meaning 'Door of Cortoro-'. The city later took its name from the Remi tribe (Rēmi or Rhēmi). The modern French name is derived from the accusative case of the latter, Rēmos.

Christianity had become established in the city by 260, at which period Saint Sixtus of Reims founded the Diocese of Reims (which would be elevated to an archdiocese around 750). The consul Jovinus, an influential supporter of the new faith, repelled the Alamanni who invaded Champagne in 336, but the Vandals captured the city in 406 and slew Bishop Nicasius; in 451 Attila the Hun put Reims to fire and sword.

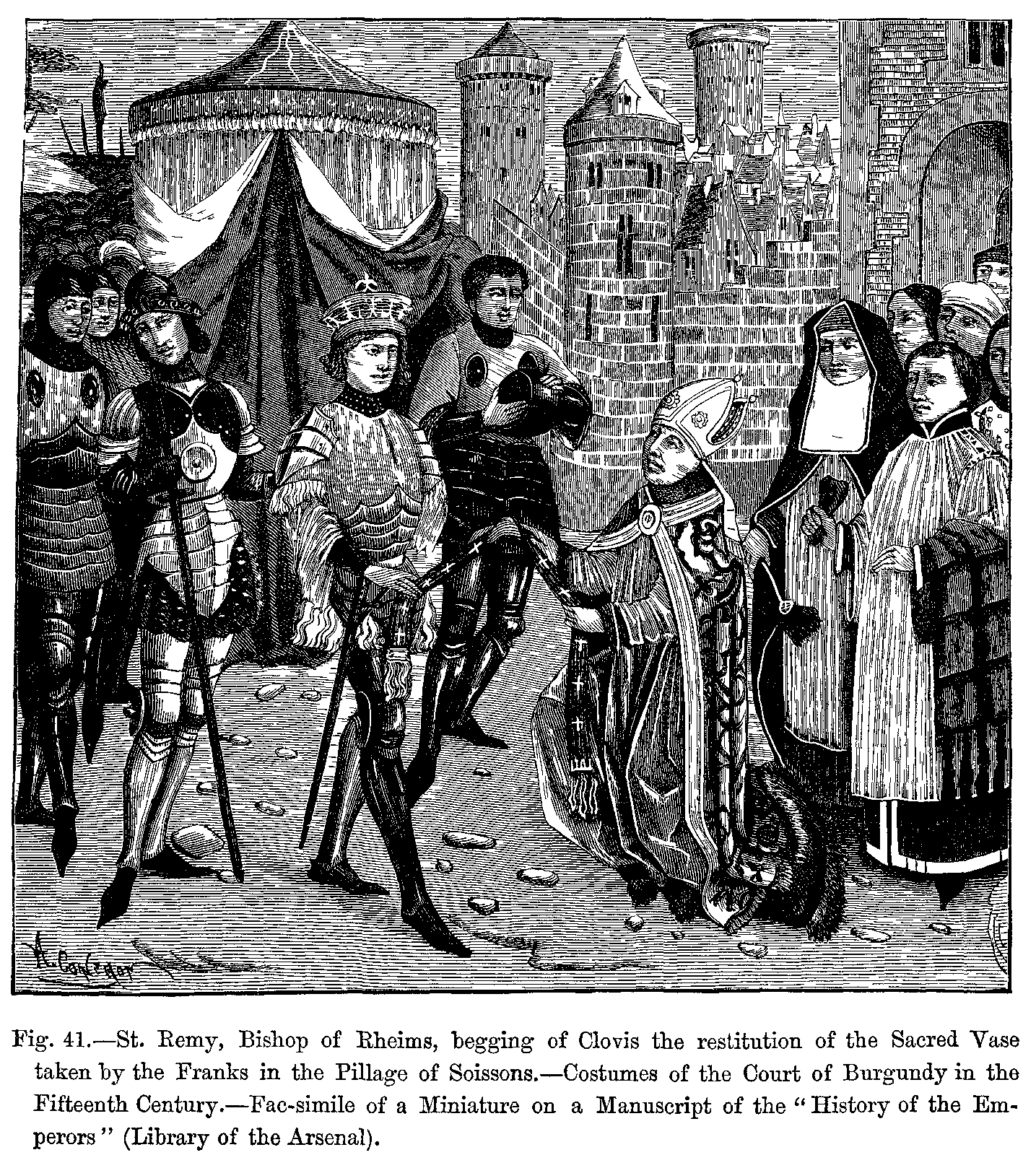
Saint Remigius, Bishop of Reims, begging Clovis of the restitution of the Sacred Vase taken by the Franks in the pillage of Soissons. From the manuscript of the History of the Emperors (Library of the Arsenal).

In 496—ten years after Clovis, King of the Salian Franks, won his victory at Soissons (486)—Remigius, the bishop of Reims, baptized him using the oil of the sacred phial–purportedly brought from heaven by a dove for the baptism of Clovis and subsequently preserved in the Abbey of Saint-Remi. For centuries the events at the crowning of Clovis I became a symbol used by the monarchy to claim the divine right to rule.

Meetings of Pope Stephen II (752–757) with Pepin the Short, and of Pope Leo III (795–816) with Charlemagne (died 814), took place at Reims; here Pope Stephen IV crowned Louis the Debonnaire in 816. King Louis IV gave the city and countship of Reims to the archbishop Artaldus in 940. King Louis VII (reigned 1137–1180) gave the title of duke and peer to William of Champagne, archbishop from 1176 to 1202, and the archbishops of Reims took precedence over the other ecclesiastical peers of the realm.

By the 10th century, Reims had become a centre of intellectual culture. Archbishop Adalberon (in office 969 to 988), seconded by the monk Gerbert (afterwards (from 999 to 1003) Pope Silvester II), founded schools which taught the classical "liberal arts". (Adalberon also played a leading role in the dynastic revolution which elevated the Capetian dynasty in the place of the Carolingians.)

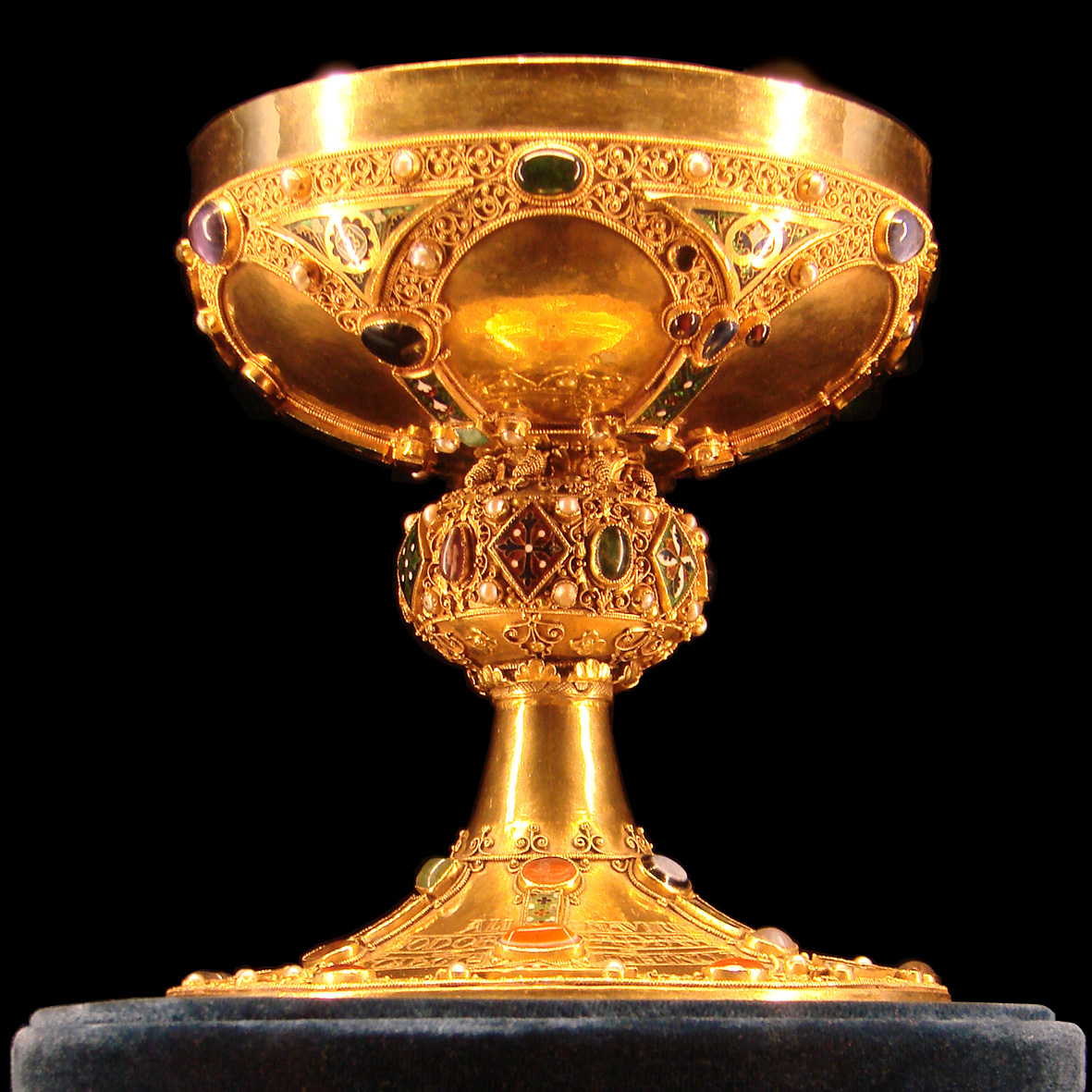
The Coronation Chalice, also known as the Chalice of Saint Remigius (Palace of Tau)

The archbishops held the important prerogative of the consecration of the kings of France – a privilege which they exercised (except in a few cases) from the time of Philippe II Augustus (anointed 1179, reigned 1180–1223) to that of Charles X (anointed 1825). The Palace of Tau, built between 1498 and 1509 and partly rebuilt in 1675, would later serve as the Archbishop's palace and as the residence of the kings of France on the occasion of their coronations, with royal banquets taking place in the Salle du Tau.

Jean-Auguste-Dominique Ingres, Joan of Arc at the Coronation of Charles VII, 1854 (Louvre)

Louis VII granted the city a communal charter in 1139. The Treaty of Troyes (1420) ceded it to the English, who had made a futile attempt to take it by siege in 1360; French patriots expelled them on the approach of Joan of Arc, who in 1429 had Charles VII consecrated in the cathedral. Louis XI cruelly suppressed a revolt at Reims, caused in 1461 by the salt tax.

During the French Wars of Religion the city sided with the Catholic League (1585), but submitted to King Henri IV after the battle of Ivry (1590). At about the same time, the English College had been "at Reims for some years".

The city was stricken with plague in 1635, and again in 1668, followed by an epidemic of typhus in 1693–1694. The construction of the Hôtel de Ville dates back to the same century.

The Place Royale was built in the 18th century. Some of the 1792 September Massacres took place in Reims.

In the invasions of the War of the Sixth Coalition in 1814, anti-Napoleonic allied armies captured and re-captured Reims. "In 1852, the Eastern Railways completed the Paris–Strasbourg main line with branch lines to Reims and Metz." In 1870–1871, during the Franco-Prussian War, the victorious Germans made it the seat of a governor-general and impoverished it with heavy requisitions. In 1874 the construction of a chain of detached forts started in the vicinity, the French Army having selected Reims as one of the chief defences of the northern approaches to Paris. (Note: Atop the ridge of St Thierry stands a fort of the same name, which with the neighbouring work of Chenay closes the west side of the place. To the north the hill of Brimont has three works guarding the Laon railway and the Aisne canal. Farther east, on the old Roman road, stands the Fort de Fresnes. Due east, the hills of Arnay are crowned with five large and important works which cover the approaches from the upper Aisne. Fort de la Pompelle, which hosts a World War I museum featuring a rich collection of German uniforms, and Montbré close the southeast side, and the Falaise hills on the southwest are open and unguarded. The perimeter of the defences measures just under 22 miles, and the forts are at a mean distance of 6 miles (10 km) from the centre of the city.) In the meantime, British inventor and manufacturer Isaac Holden had opened plants at Reims and Croix, which "by the 1870s [...] were producing almost 12 million kilograms of combed wool a year [...] and accounted for 27 percent of all the wool consumed by French industry."

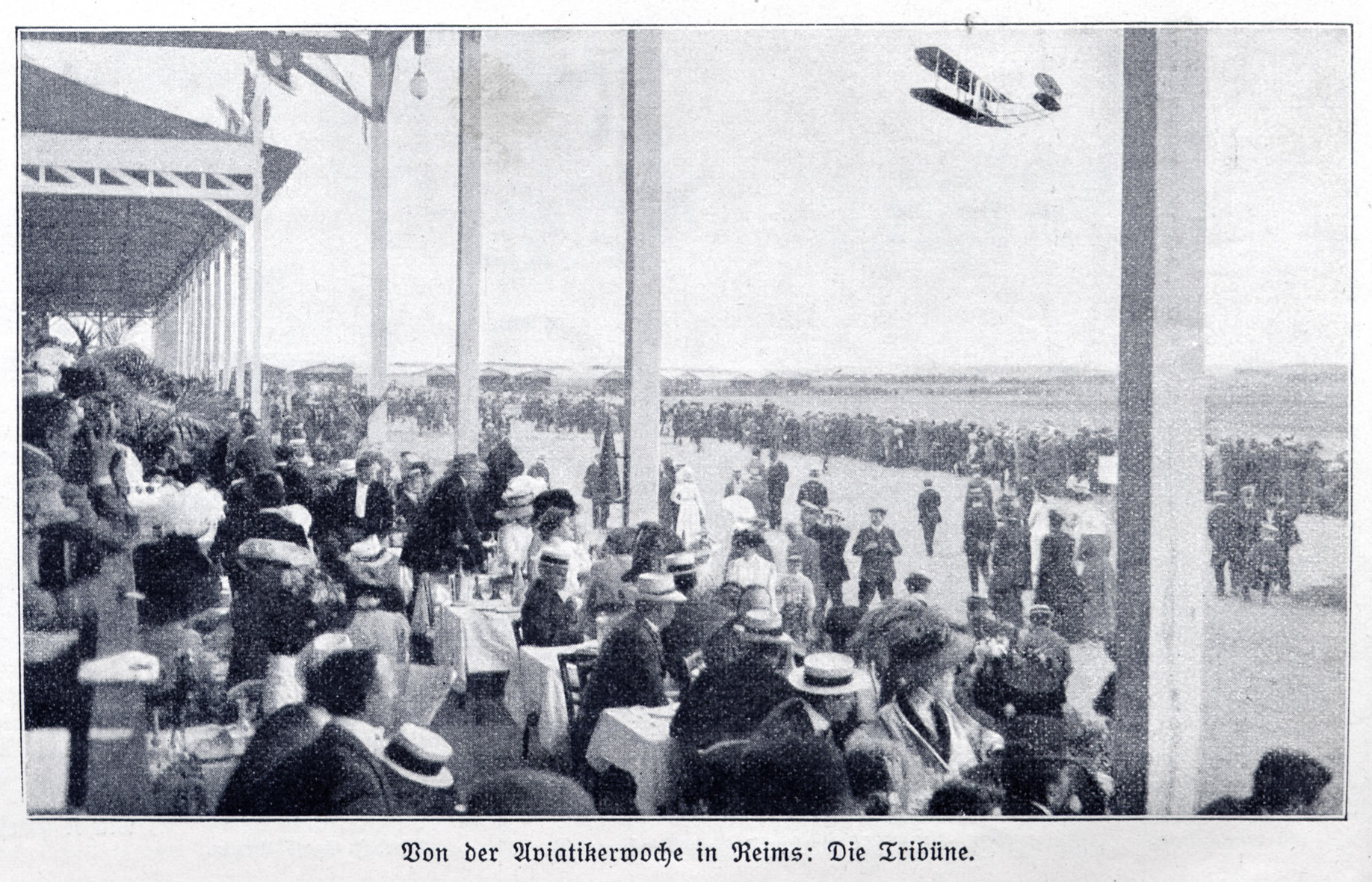
A month after Blériot's crossing of the English Channel in a biplane, the aviation week in Reims (August 1909) caught special attention.

On 30 October 1908, Henri Farman made the first cross-country flight from Châlons to Reims. In August 1909 Reims hosted the first international aviation meet, the Grande Semaine d'Aviation de la Champagne. Major aviation personages such as Glenn Curtiss, Louis Blériot and Louis Paulhan participated.

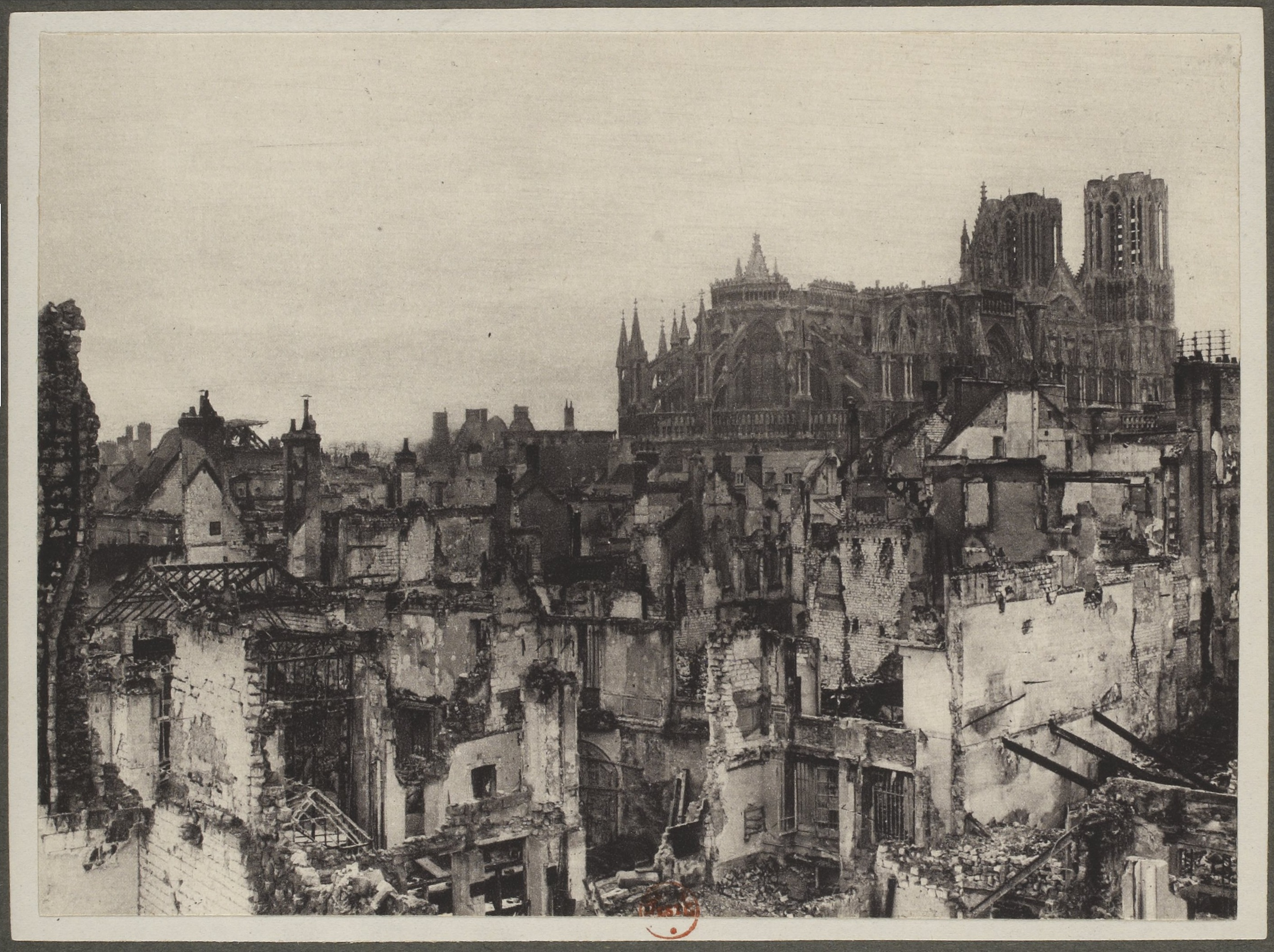
Reims in 1916

Hostilities in World War I greatly damaged the city. German bombardment and a subsequent fire in 1914 did severe damage to the cathedral. The ruined cathedral became one of the central images of anti-German propaganda produced in France during the war, which presented it, along with the ruins of the Ypres Cloth Hall and the University Library in Louvain, as evidence that German aggression targeted cultural landmarks of European civilization. Since the end of World War I, an international effort to restore the cathedral from the ruins has continued.

During World War II, the city suffered additional damage. On the morning of 7 May 1945, at 02:41, General Eisenhower and the Allies received the unconditional surrender of the German Wehrmacht in Reims. General Alfred Jodl, German Chief-of-Staff, signed the surrender at the Supreme Headquarters Allied Expeditionary Force (SHAEF) as the representative for German President Karl Dönitz.

The British statesman Leslie Hore-Belisha died of a cerebral haemorrhage while making a speech at the Hôtel de Ville in February 1957.

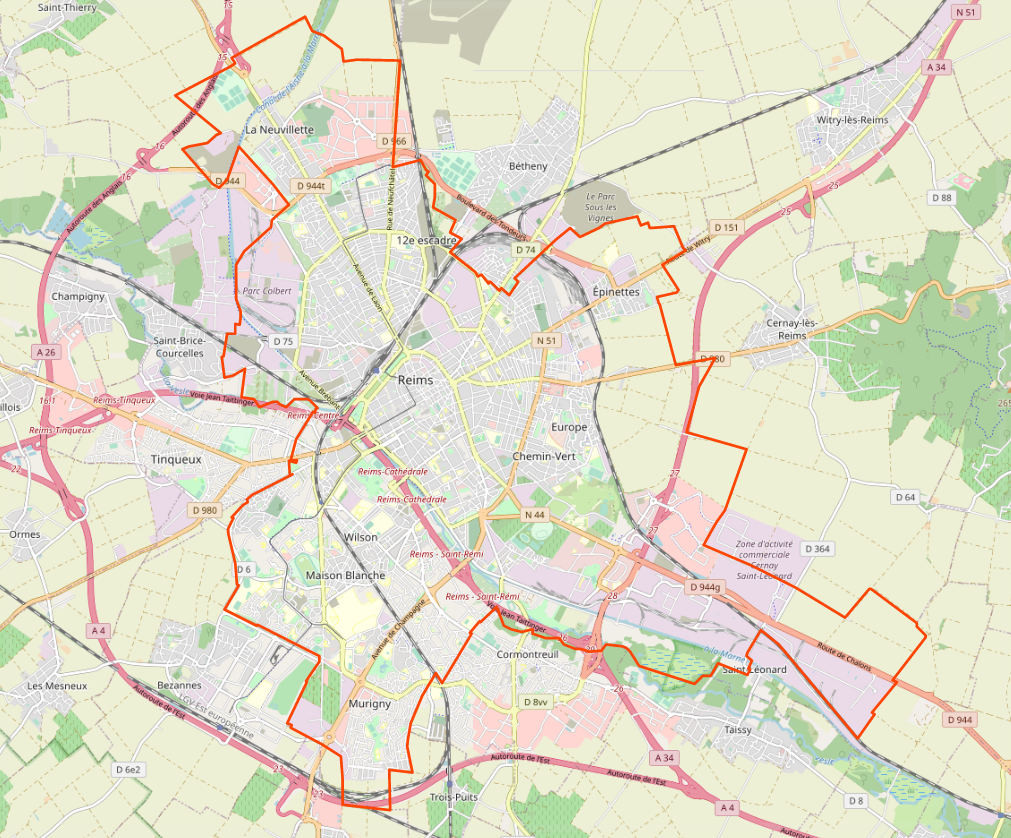
Map of Rheims

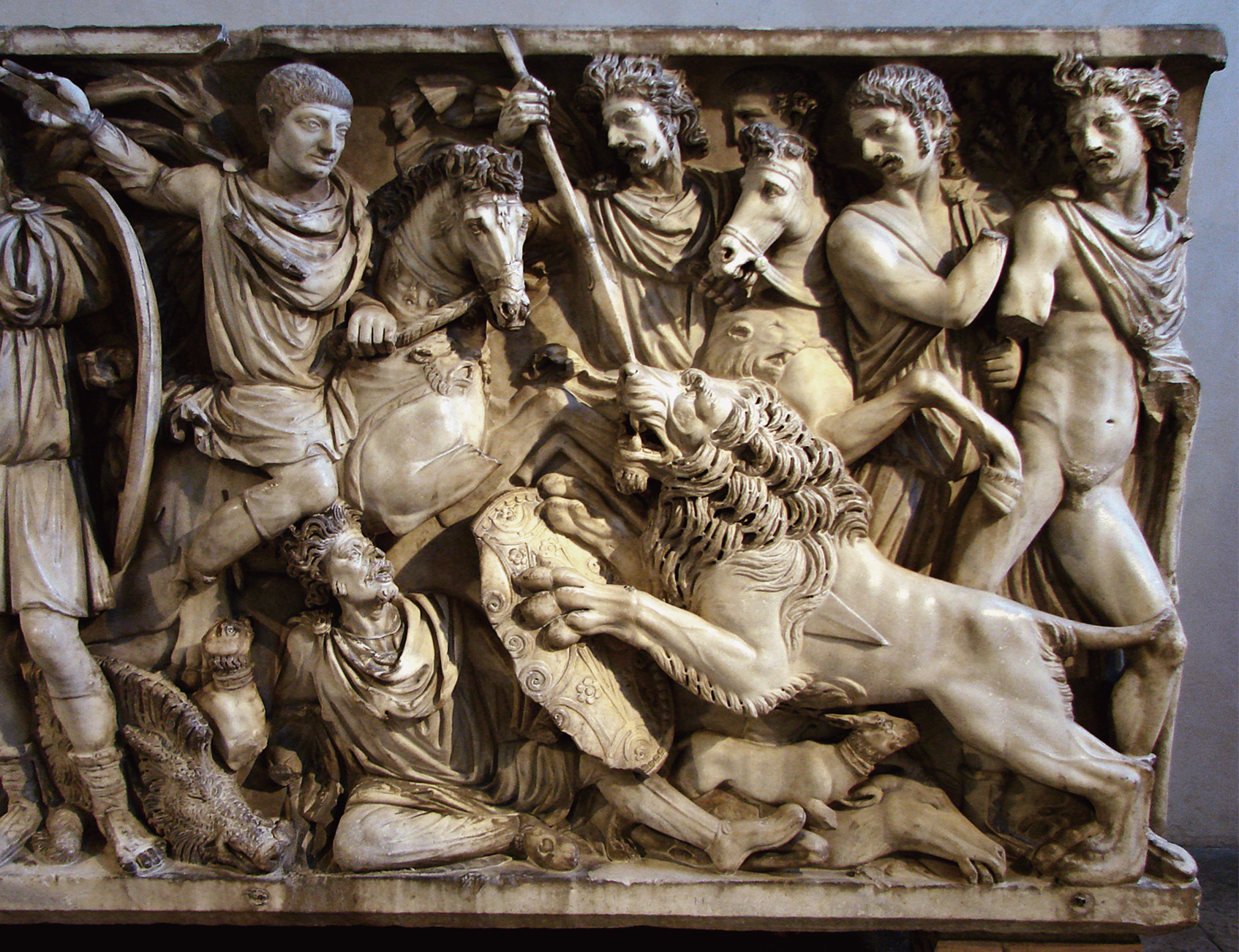
Sarcophagus of Jovinus (Musée Saint-Remi)

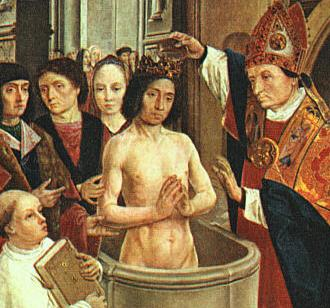
Master of Saint Giles, The Baptism of Clovis (detail), c. 1500 (National Gallery of Art)

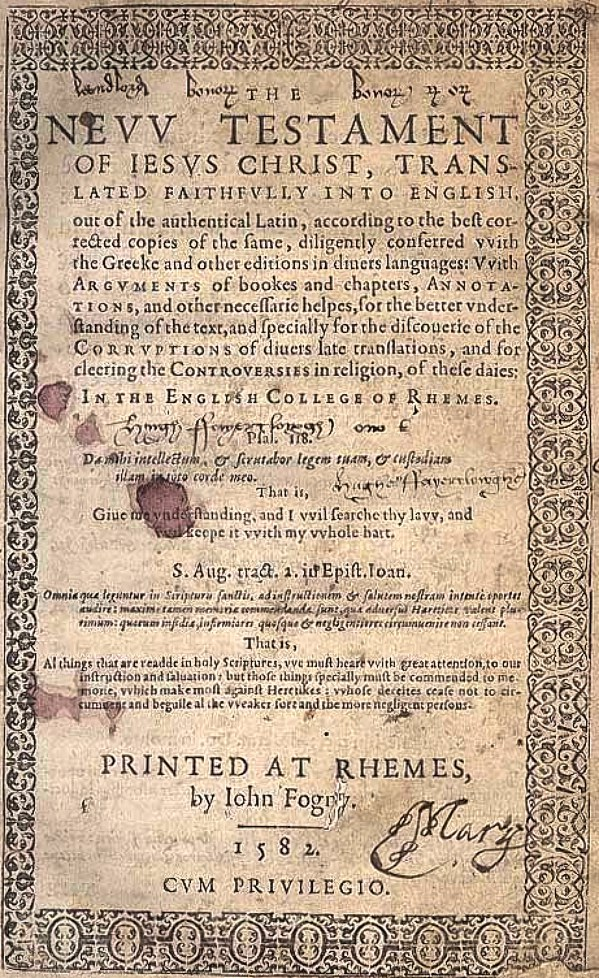
The New Testament of the Douay–Rheims Bible was printed in Reims in 1582.

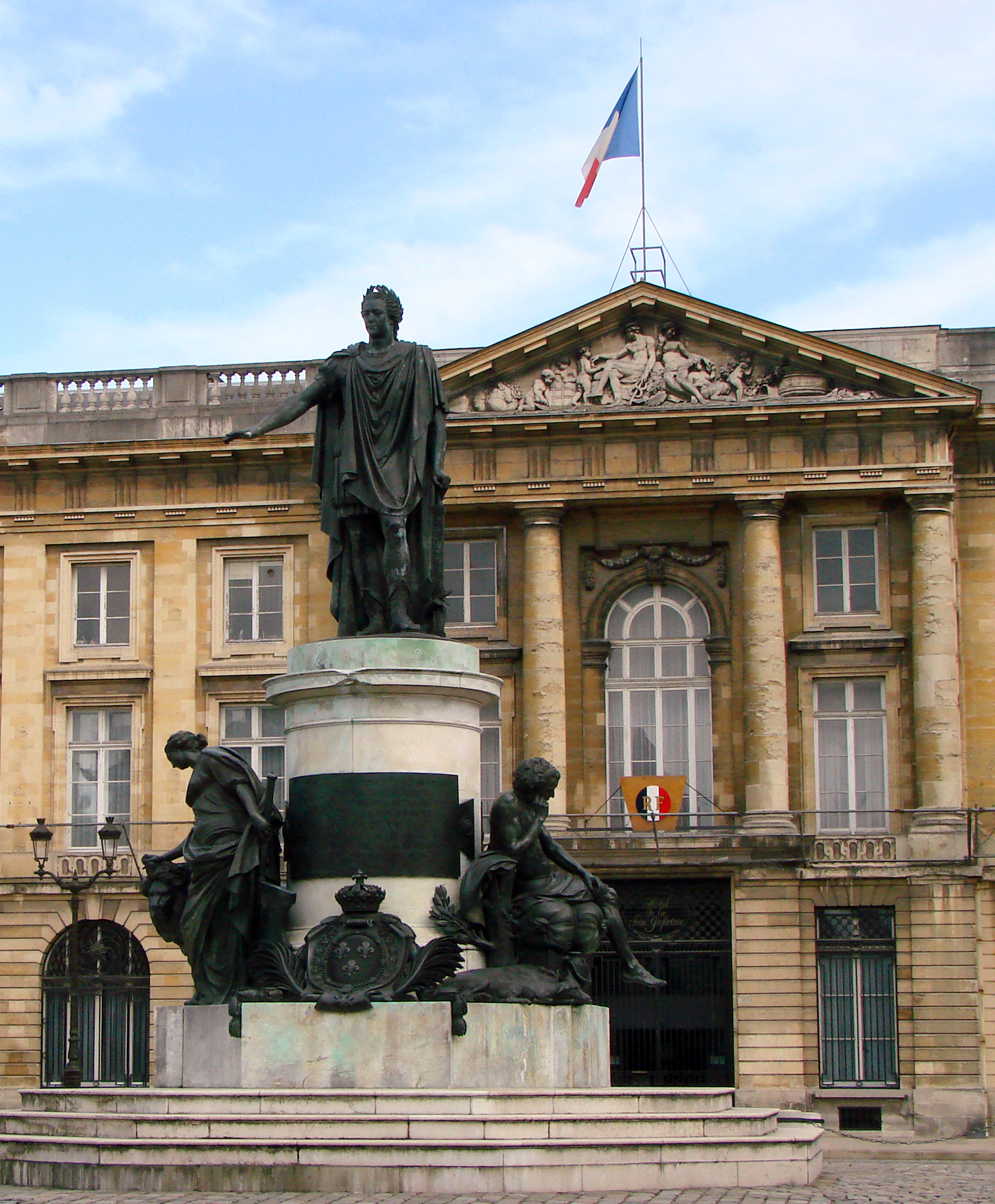
Monument to King Louis XV, at the center of Place Royale

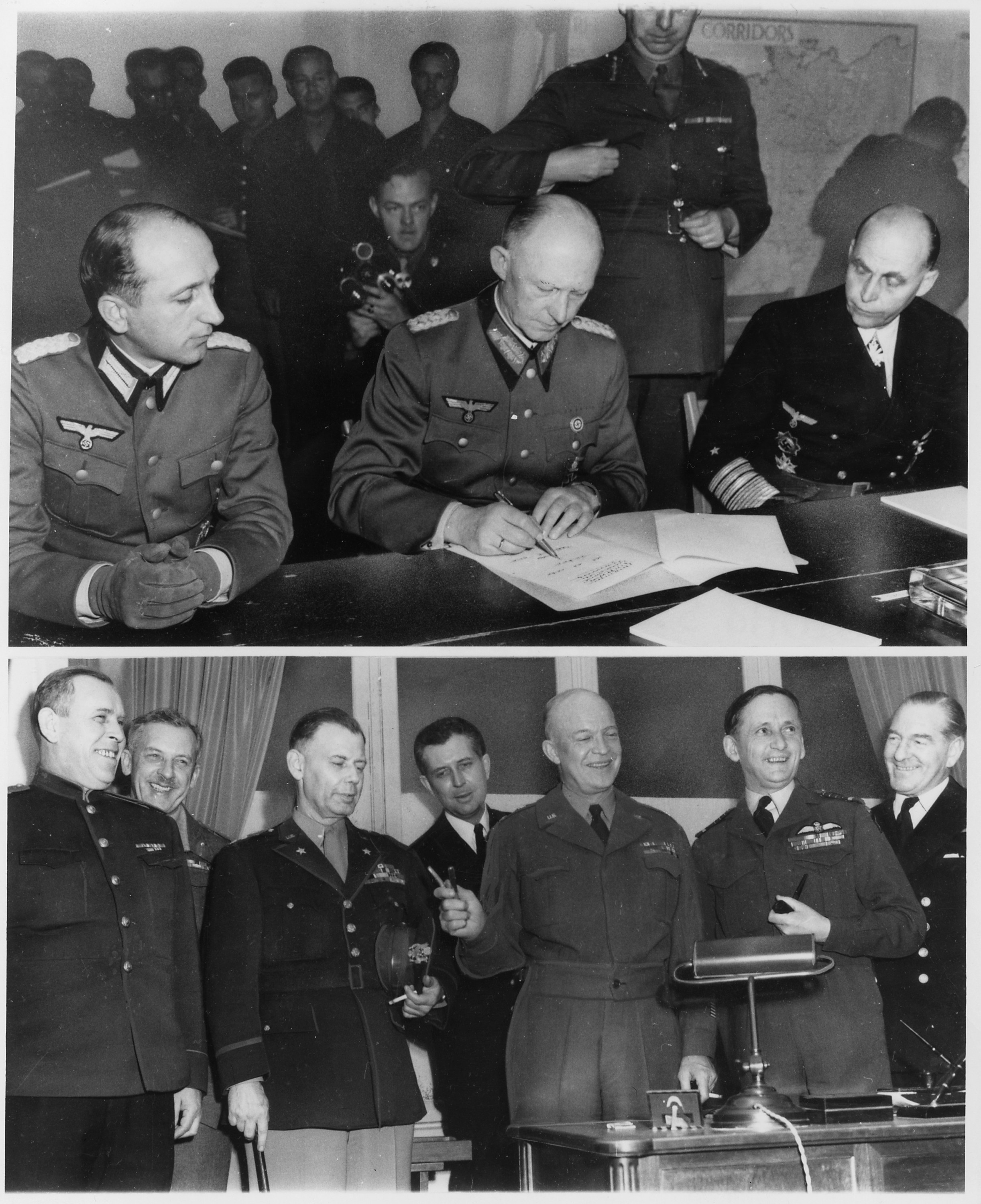
German surrender of 7 May 1945 in Reims. Top: German officers sign unconditional surrender in Reims. Bottom: Allied force leaders at the signing.

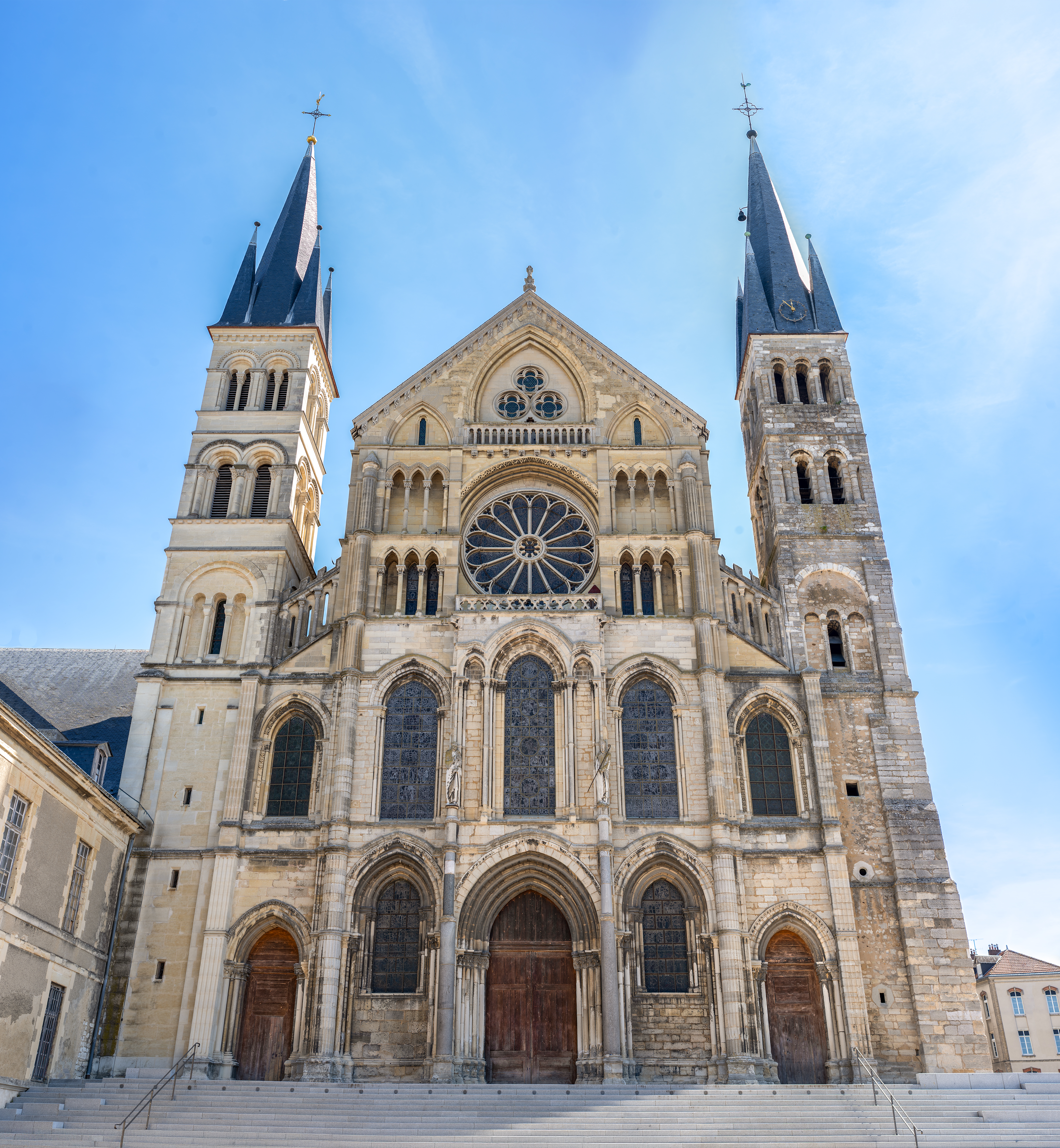
Basilica of Saint-Remi

== Administration ==
Reims functions as a subprefecture of the department of Marne, in the administrative region of Grand Est. Although Reims is by far the largest commune in its department, Châlons-en-Champagne is the prefecture. Reims co-operates with 142 other communes in the Communauté urbaine du Grand Reims.

== Demographics ==
Historical population

Year	Pop.	±% p.a.
1793	32,334	—
1800	30,225	−0.96%
1806	31,779	+0.84%
1821	31,080	−0.15%
1831	39,298	+2.37%
1836	38,959	−0.17%
1841	40,776	+0.92%
1846	43,905	+1.49%
1851	45,754	+0.83%
1856	48,350	+1.11%
1861	52,394	+1.62%
1866	58,905	+2.37%
1872	70,434	+3.02%
1876	81,328	+3.66%
1881	93,823	+2.90%
1886	97,903	+0.85%
1891	104,186	+1.25%
1896	107,963	+0.71%
1901	108,385	+0.08%

Year	Pop.	±% p.a.
1906	109,859	+0.27%
1911	115,178	+0.95%
1921	76,645	−3.99%
1926	100,998	+5.67%
1931	112,820	+2.24%
1936	116,687	+0.68%
1946	110,749	−0.52%
1954	121,145	+1.13%
1962	133,914	+1.26%
1968	152,967	+2.24%
1975	178,381	+2.22%
1982	177,234	−0.09%
1990	180,620	+0.24%
1999	187,206	+0.40%
2007	183,500	−0.25%
2012	181,893	−0.18%
2017	182,460	+0.06%
2023	177,674	−0.44%

Source: EHESS and INSEE (1968-2023)

== Economy ==
Rue de Vesle is the main commercial street (continued under other names), traversing the city from southwest to northeast through the Place Royale. The economy of Reims is driven by the wine and Champagne industries and innovation in the bio-economic field.

== Architecture ==
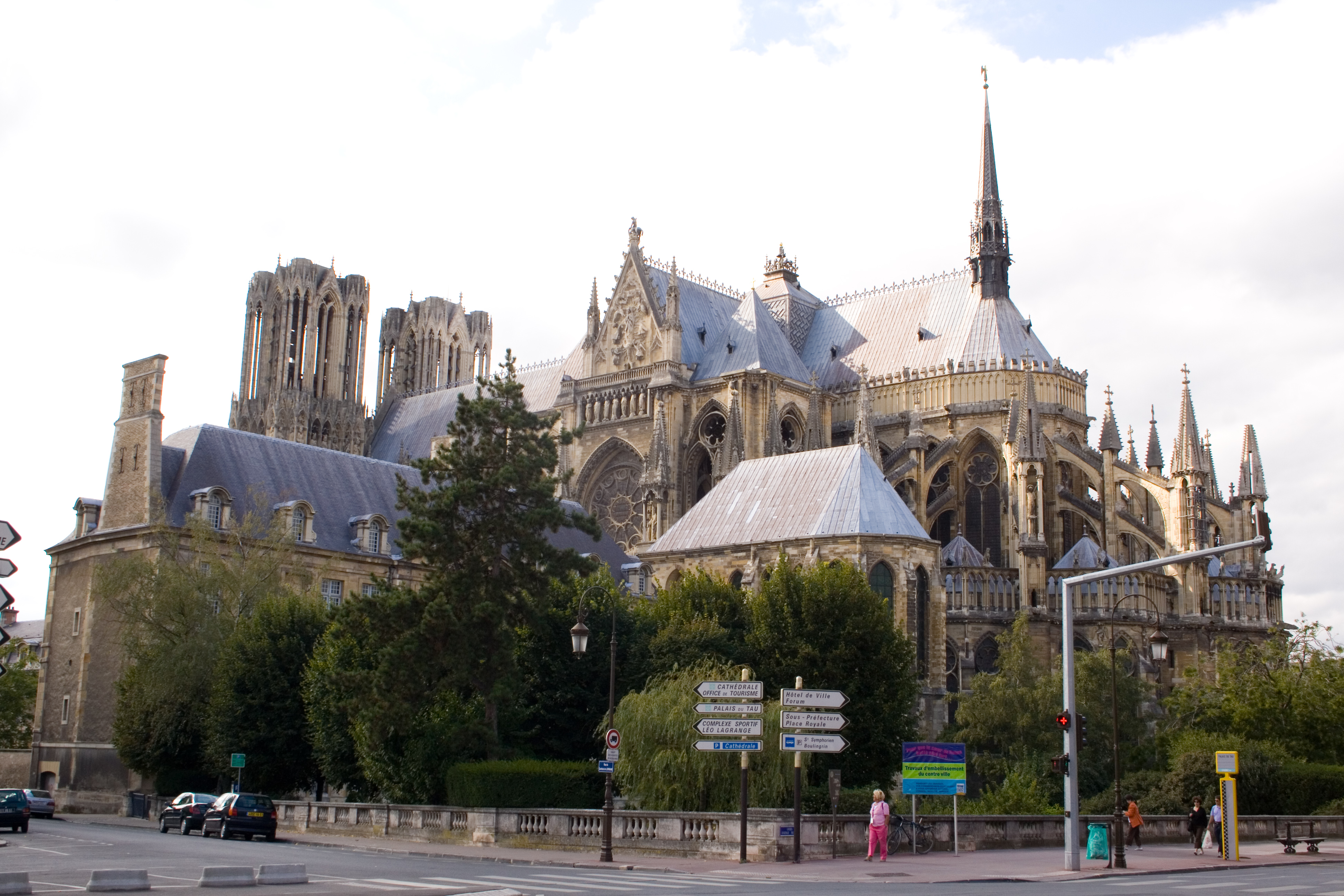
Reims Cathedral and Palace of Tau

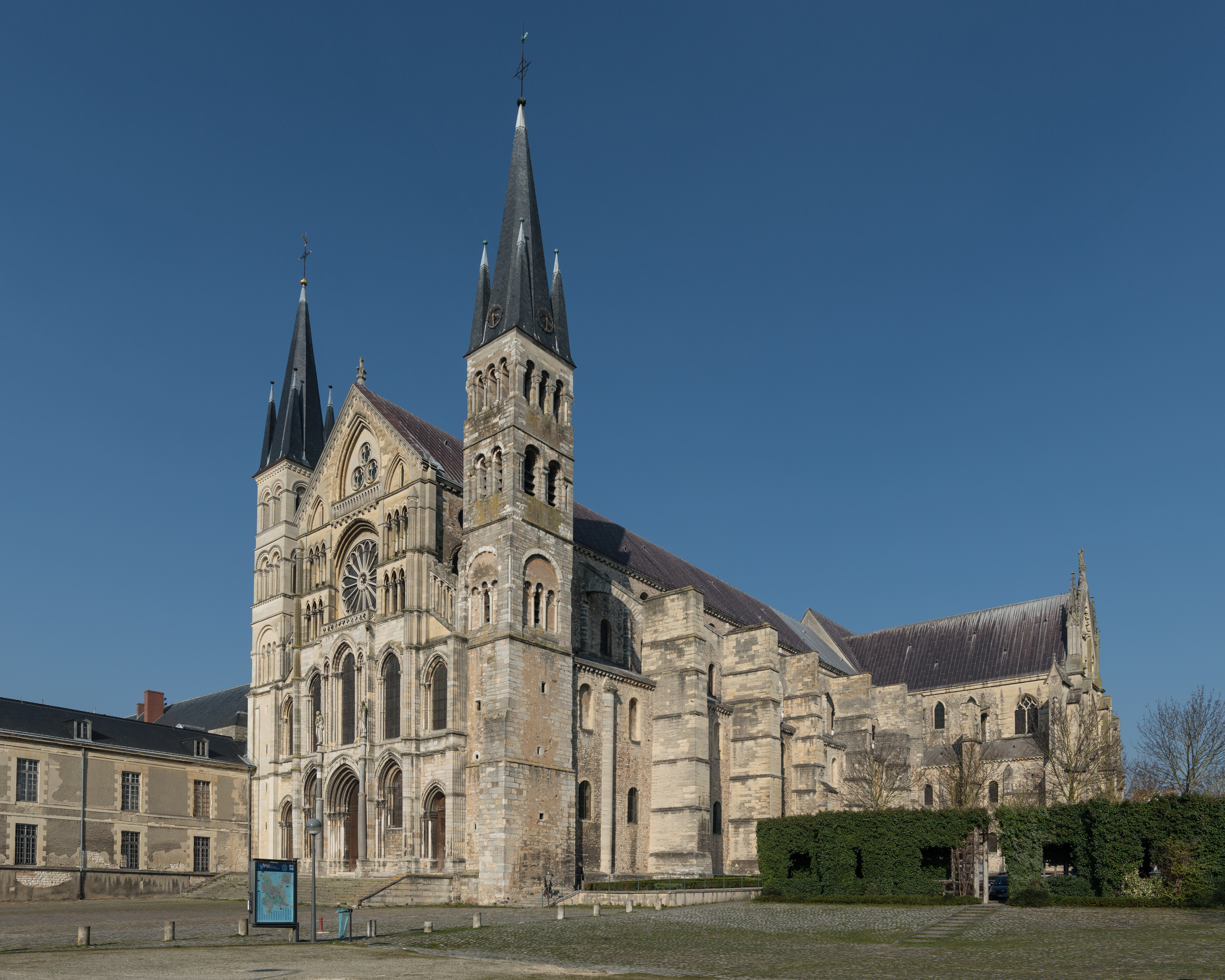
Basilica of Saint-Remi

Reims Cathedral is an example of French Gothic architecture.

The Basilica of Saint-Remi, founded in the 11th century "over the chapel of St. Christophe where St. Remi was buried", is "the largest Romanesque church in northern France, though with later additions."

The Church of Saint-Jacques dates from the 13th to the 16th centuries. A few blocks from the cathedral, it stands as of 2009 in a neighbourhood of shopping and restaurants. The churches of Saint-Maurice (partly rebuilt in 1867), Saint-André, and Saint-Thomas (erected from 1847 to 1853, under the patronage of Cardinal Gousset, now buried within its walls) also draw tourists.

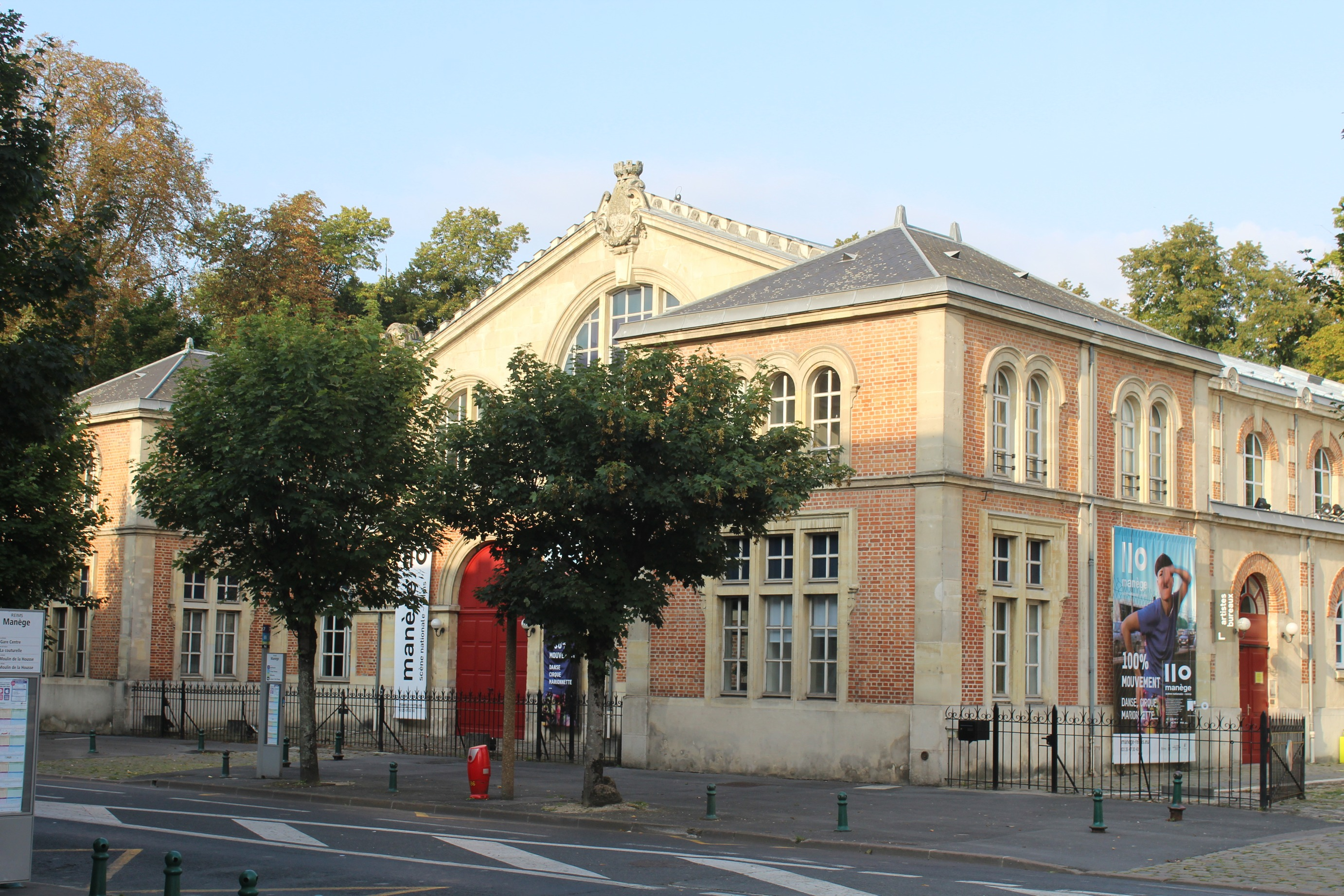
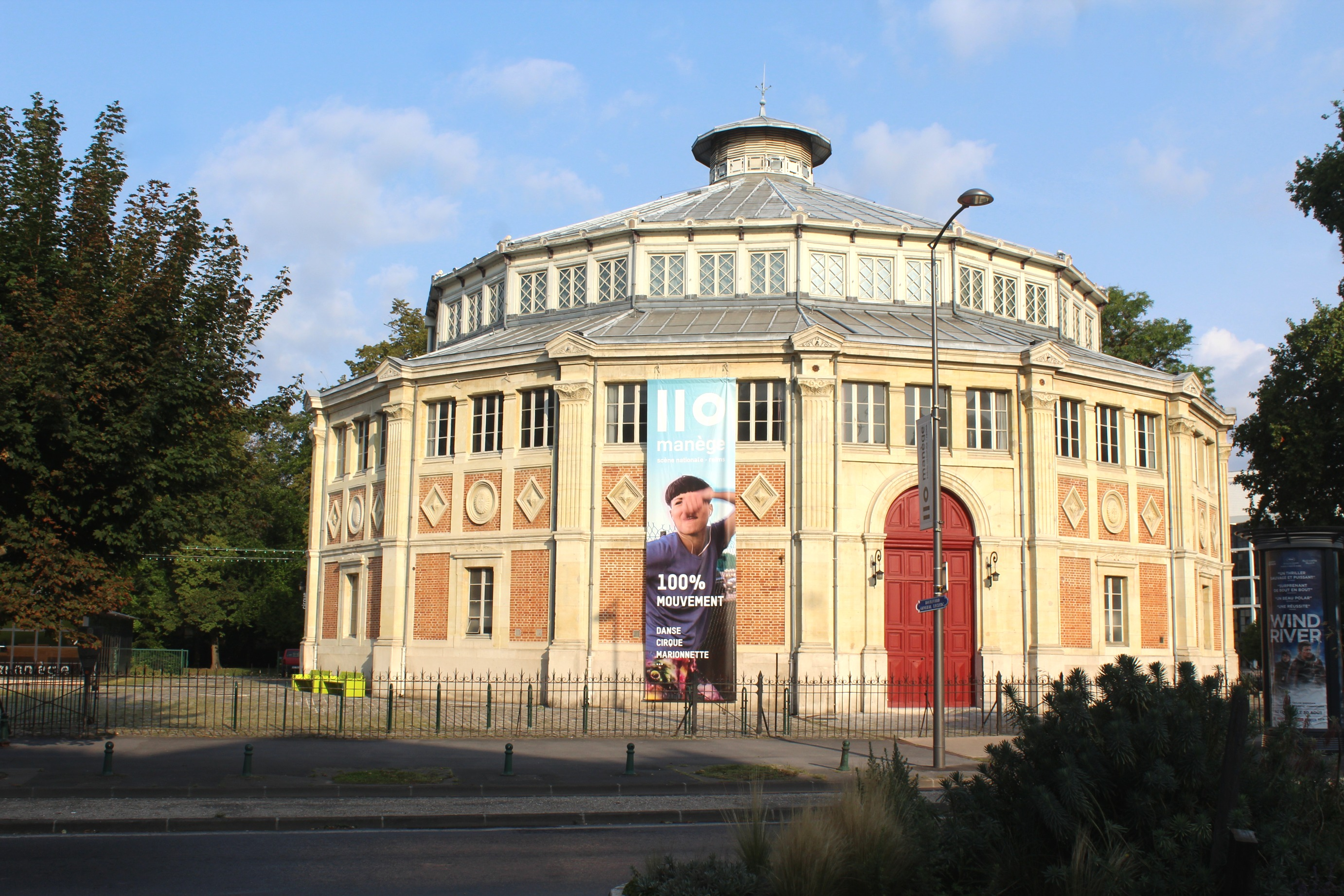
The Reims Manège and Circus

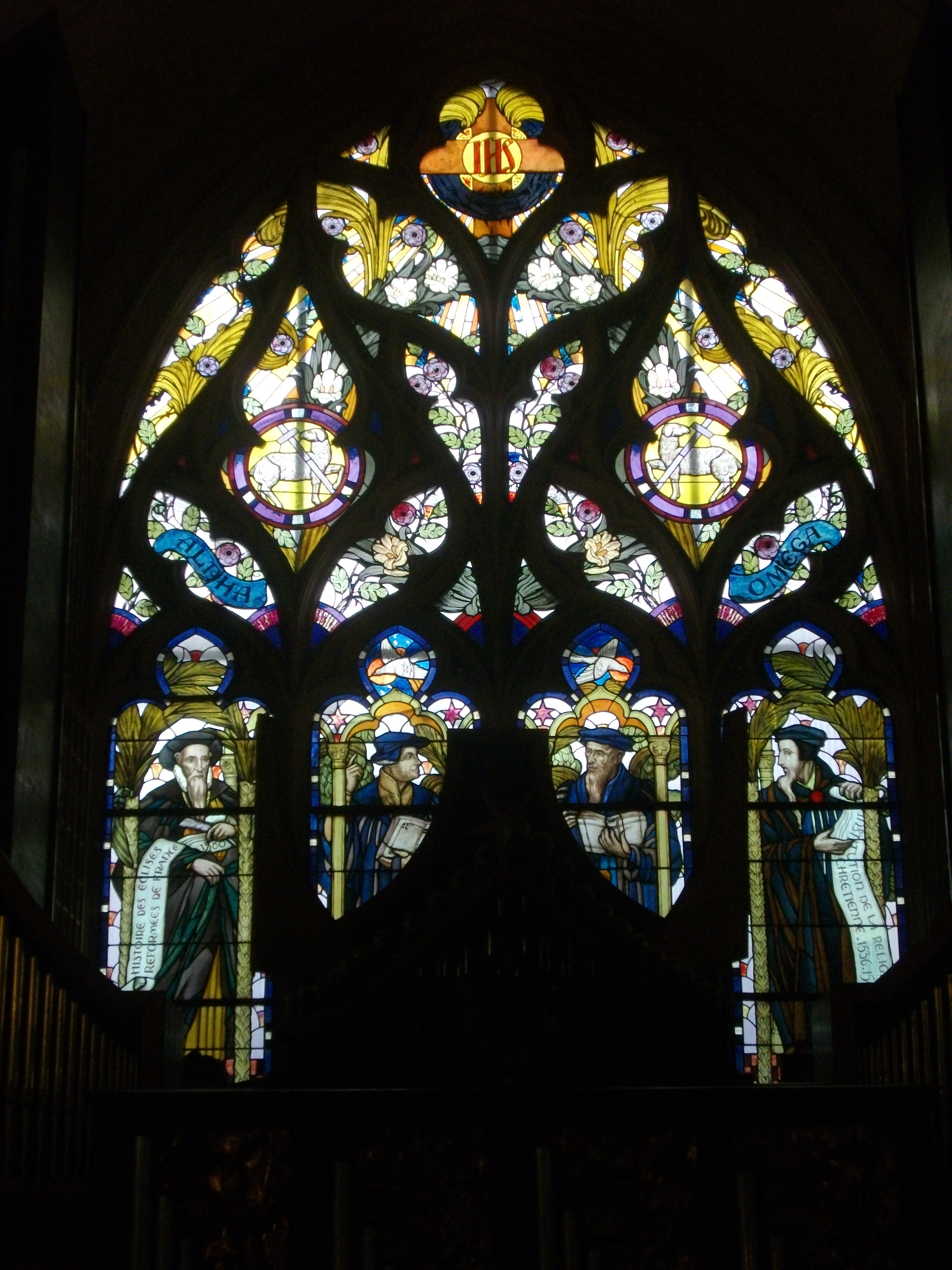
A stained glass window of the Protestant Church of Reims

The Protestant Church of Reims, built in 1921–1923 over designs by Charles Letrosne, is an example of flamboyant neo-Gothic architecture.

The Hôtel de Ville, erected in the 17th century and enlarged in the 19th, features a pediment with an equestrian statue of Louis XIII (reigned 1610 to 1643).

Narcisse Brunette was the architect of the city for nearly 50 years in the 19th century. He designed the Reims Manège and Circus, which "combines stone and brick in a fairly sober classical composition."

Examples of Art Deco in Reims include the Carnegie library.

The Foujita Chapel, built in 1965–1966 over designs and with frescos by Japanese–French artist Tsuguharu Foujita, has been listed as a monument historique since 1992.

== Culture ==
Reims was a candidate in the bid to become the European Capital of Culture in 2028, however was eliminated in the preselection round.

=== Museums ===
The Palace of Tau contains such exhibits as statues formerly displayed by the cathedral, treasures of the cathedral from past centuries, and royal attire from coronations of French kings.

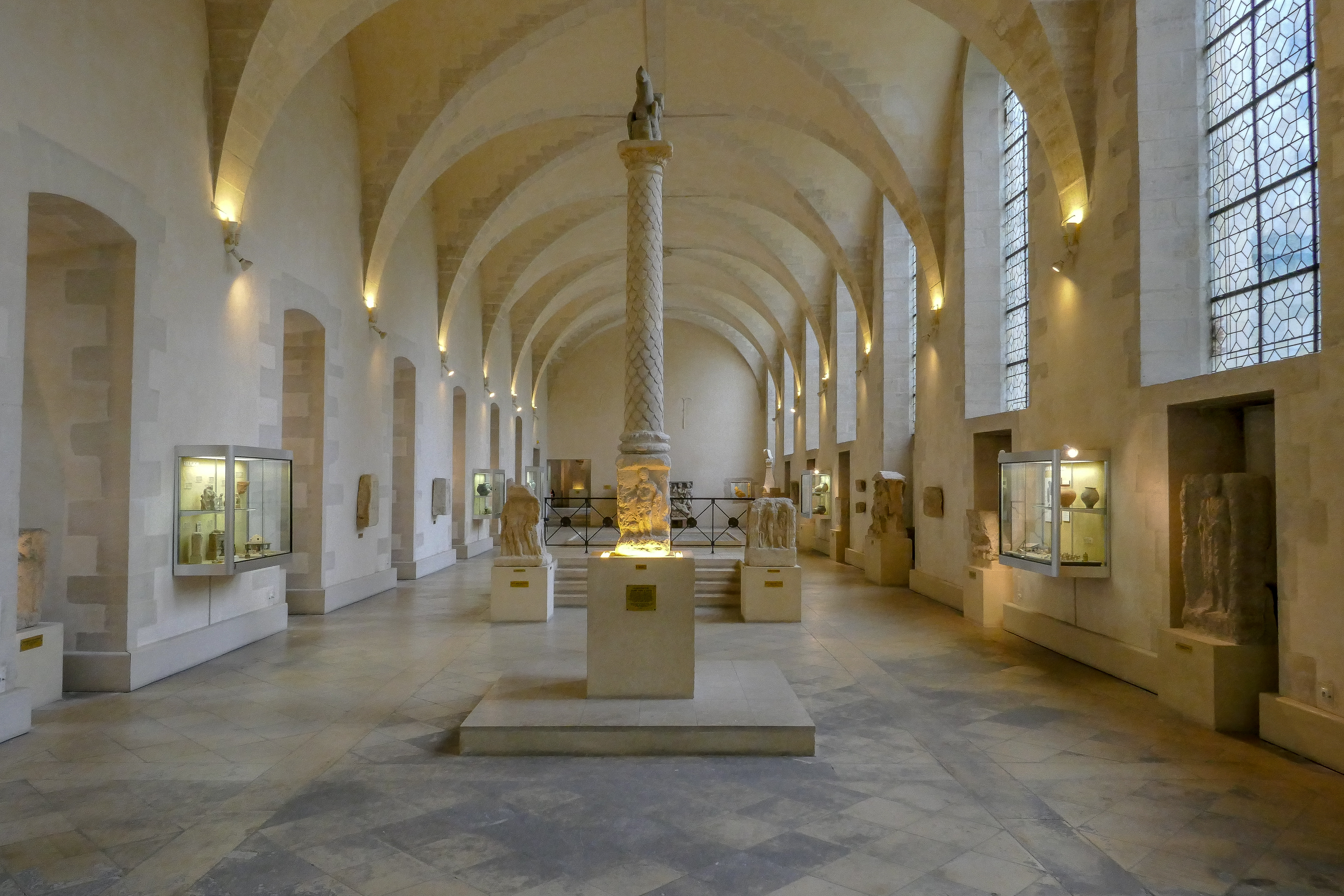
Musée Saint-Remi

The Musée Saint-Remi, formerly the Abbey of Saint-Remi, contains tapestries from the 16th century donated by the archbishop Robert de Lenoncourt (uncle of the cardinal of the same name), marble capitals from the fourth century AD, furniture, jewellery, pottery, weapons and glasswork from the sixth to eighth centuries, medieval sculpture, the façade of the 13th-century musicians' House, remnants from an earlier abbey building, and also exhibits of Gallo-Roman arts and crafts and a room of pottery, jewellery and weapons from Gallic civilization, as well as an exhibit of items from the Palaeolithic to the Neolithic periods. Another section of the museum features a permanent military exhibition.

The Automobile Museum Reims-Champagne, established in 1985 by Philippe Charbonneaux, houses a collection of automobiles dating from 1903 to the present day. The museum has five collections: automobiles, motorcycles and two-wheelers, pedal cars, miniature toys, and enamel plaques.

The Museum of Fine Arts is housed in the former Abbey of Saint-Denis. Part of the former Collège des Jésuites has also become a contemporary art gallery: the FRAC Champagne-Ardenne.

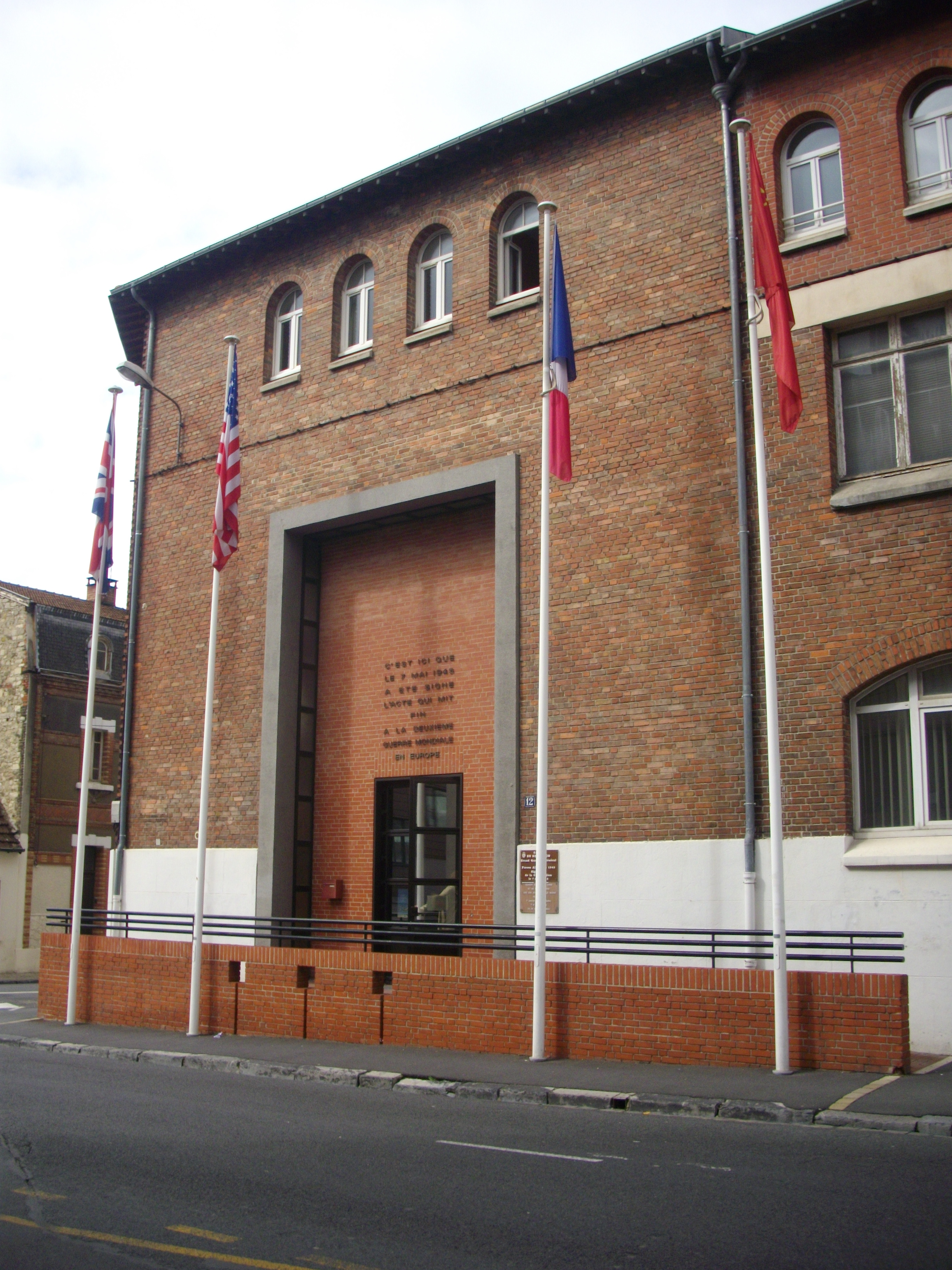
The Museum of the Surrender

The Museum of the Surrender is the building in which on 7 May 1945, General Eisenhower and the Allies received the unconditional surrender of the German Wehrmacht.

=== Theaters ===
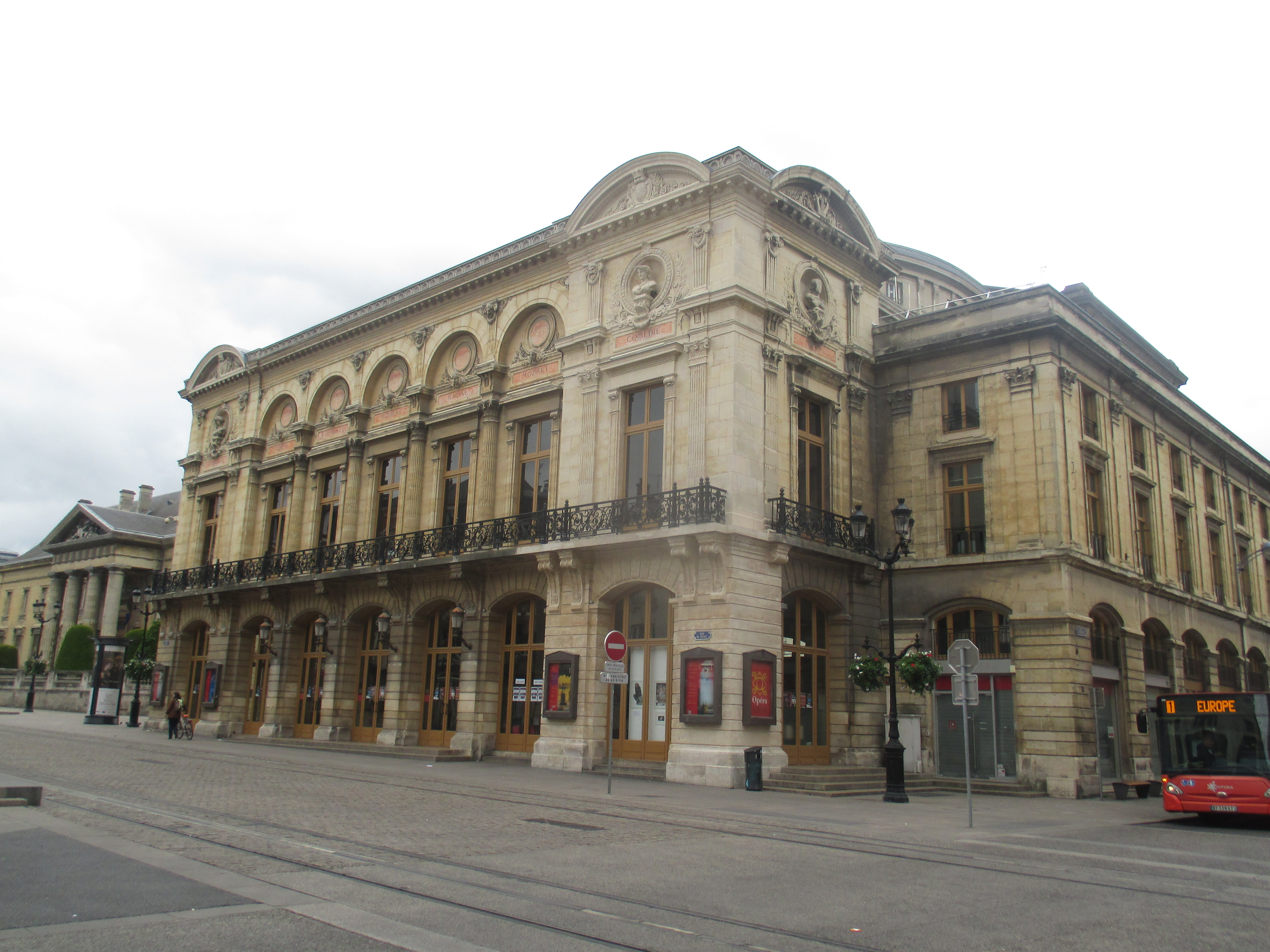
Reims Opera House

Venues include the Reims Opera House, built in 1873 and renovated in 1931–1932, and the Reims Manège and Circus, dating from 1865 and 1867.

The Comédie de Reims was inaugurated in 1966.

=== Libraries ===
Libraries in Reims include a Carnegie library which was built in the 1920s.

=== Festivals and events ===
At the beginning of the year, the FARaway - Festival des Arts à Reims is a two-week event of music, dance, theatre, exhibitions, and installations at various cultural venues around the city.

Every year in June, the Fêtes Johanniques commemorate the entrance of Joan of Arc into Reims in 1429 and the coronation of Charles VII of France in the cathedral.

In August and September there are regular evening light shows called Regalia projected onto the Reims Cathedral. It has a duration of 15 minutes and is free of charge. Regalia is an open-air multimedia show telling the story of the French coronations in a dramatic and whimsical fashion. Pets are welcome.

A Christmas market was held on the parvis of Reims Cathedral (Place du Cardinal-Luçon). It has since been moved in front of the Reims train station. In takes place in the month before Christmas, in 2023 this will be November 24 until December 24. The Christmas market in Reims is the 3rd largest Christmas market in France. There are 150 different stalls each with various regional crafts, gifts, foods and specialities. This includes a famous poutine stand. The market last year was open on Mondays from 2pm to 8pm, Tuesday to Thursday from 10:30am to 10pm, Friday from 10:30am to 10pm, Saturday from 10am to 10pm, and Sundays from 10pm to 8pm. Access to the Christmas market is free and it is accessible to people with reduced mobility. Dogs are welcome if they are on a leash. Close by, there is a large traditional Christmas tree.

=== Wine and food ===
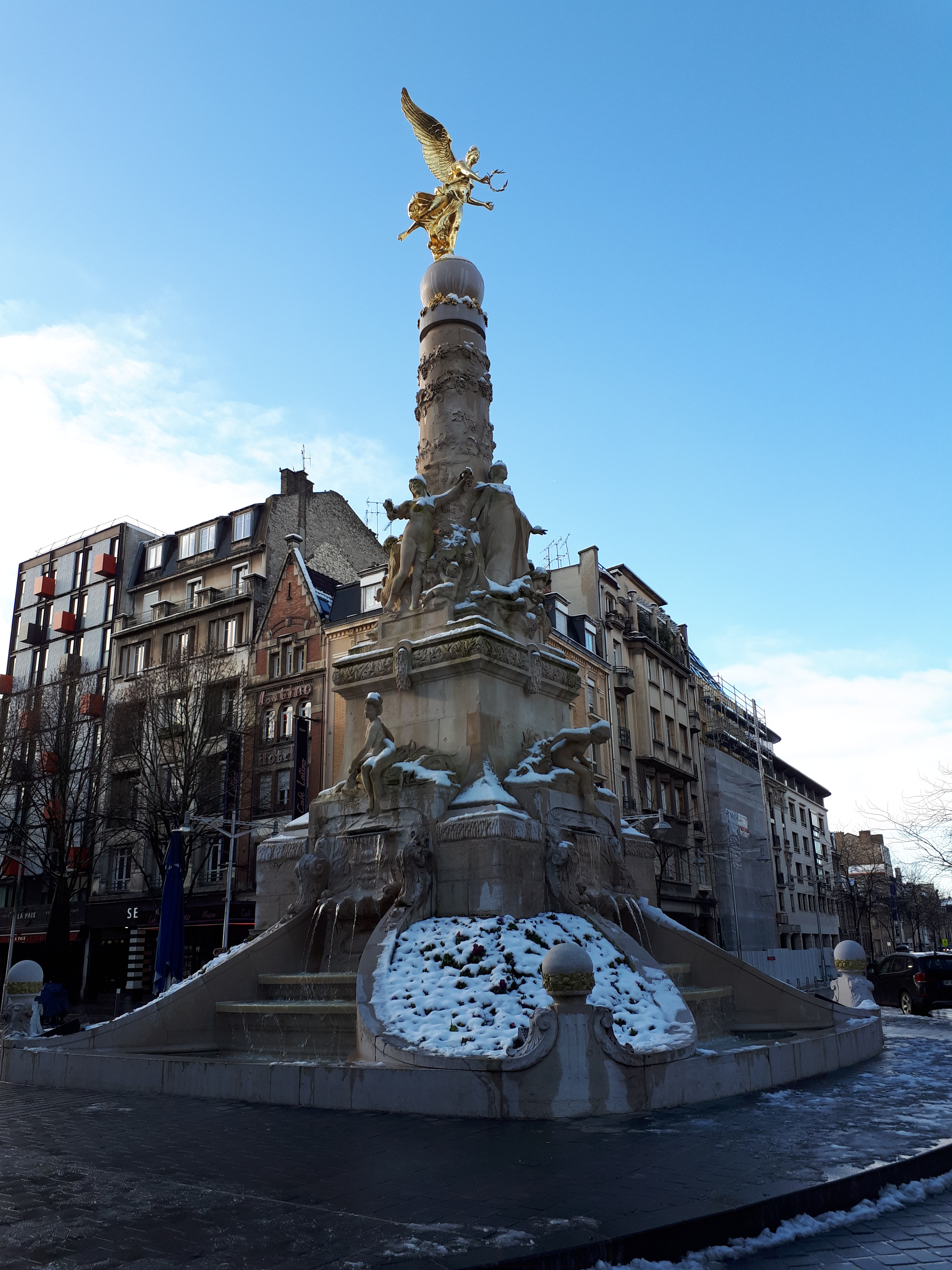
Place Drouet d'Erlon

Restaurants and bars are concentrated around Place Drouet d'Erlon in the city centre.

Reims, along with Épernay and Ay, functions as one of the centres of champagne production. Many of the largest champagne-producing houses, known as les grandes marques, have their headquarters in Reims, and most open for tasting and tours. Champagne ages in the many caves and tunnels under Reims, which form a sort of maze below the city. Carved from chalk, some of these passages date back to Roman times.

The biscuit rose de Reims is a biscuit frequently associated with Champagne wine. Reims was long renown for its pain d'épices and nonnette.

=== Sports ===
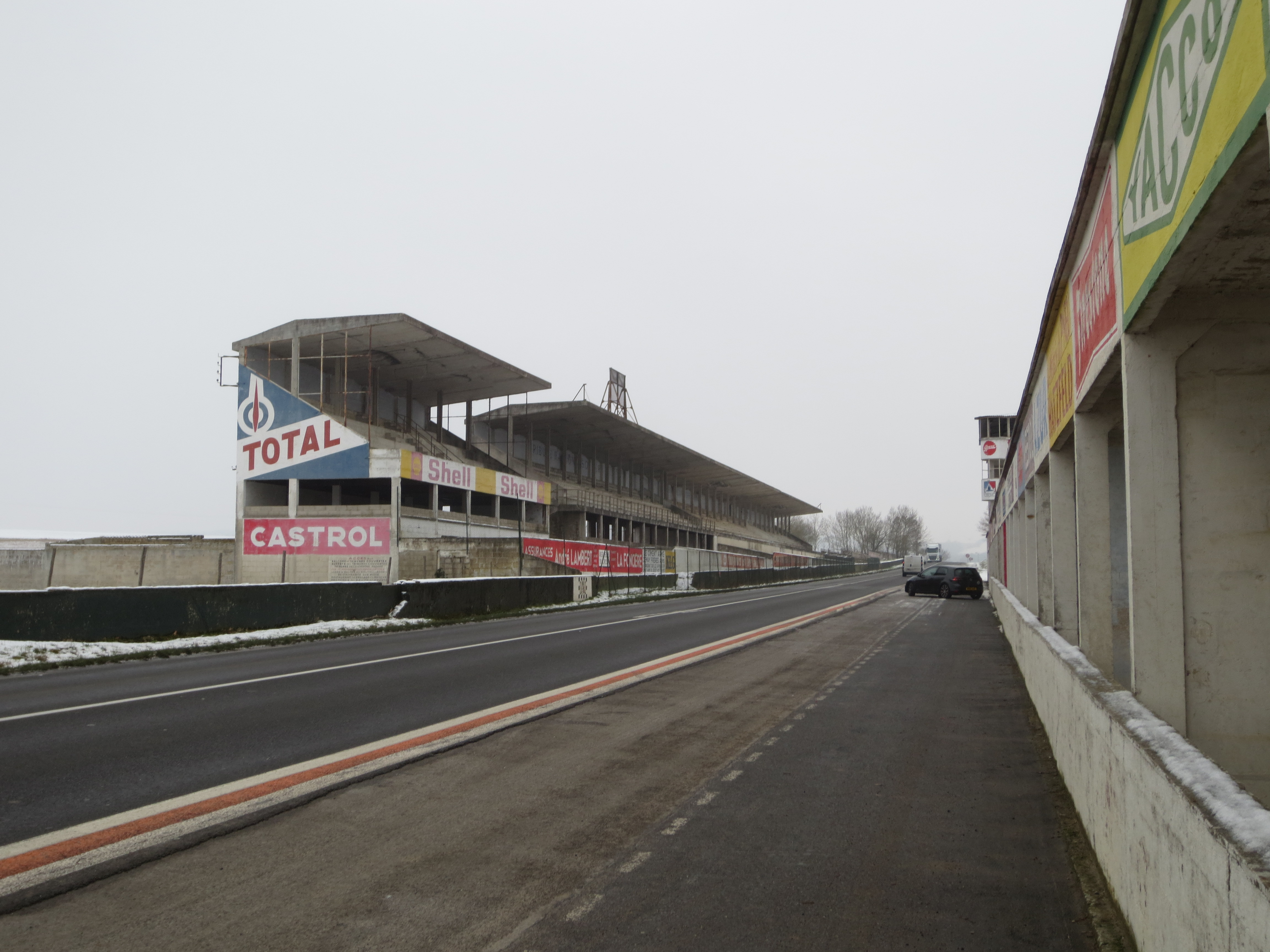
Reims-Gueux circuit

Between 1925 and 1969, Reims hosted the Grand Prix de la Marne automobile race at the circuit of Reims-Gueux. The French Grand Prix took place here 14 times between 1938 and 1966.

As of 2026, the football club Stade Reims, based in the city, competes in the Ligue 2, the 2nd highest tier of French football. Stade Reims became the outstanding team of France in the 1950s and early 1960s and reached the final of the European Cup of Champions twice in that era.

In October 2018, the city hosted the second Teqball World Cup.

The city has hosted the Reims Marathon since 1984.

== Transport ==
Reims is served by two main railway stations: Gare de Reims in the city centre, the hub for regional transport, and the new Gare de Champagne-Ardenne TGV 5 kilometres (3 miles) southwest of the city with high-speed rail connections to Paris, Metz, Nancy and Strasbourg. There are two other railway stations for local services in the southern suburbs: Franchet d'Esperey and Reims-Maison-Blanche. The motorways A4 (Paris-Strasbourg), A26 (Calais-Langres) and A34 intersect near Reims.

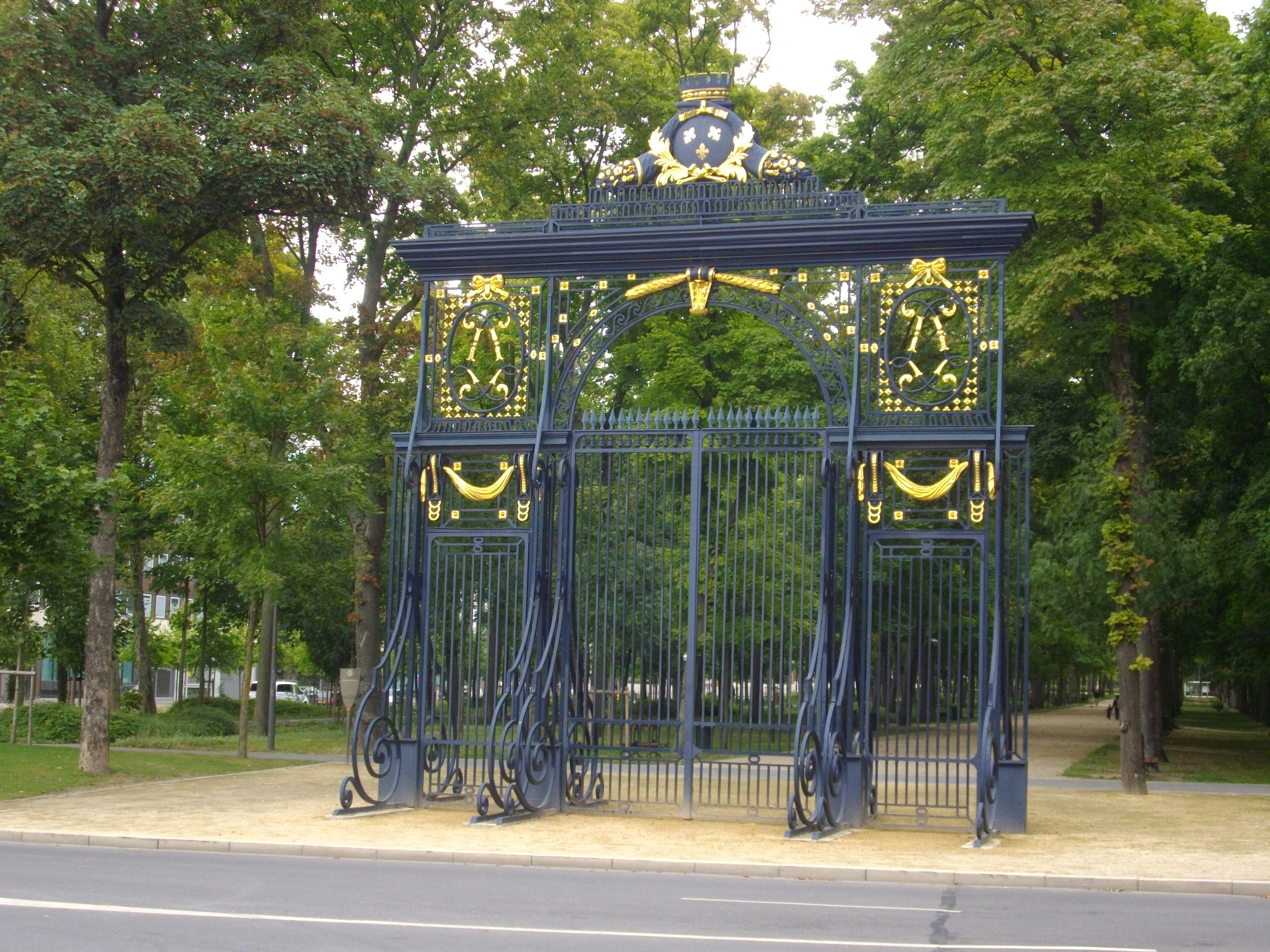
Paris Gate, Basses Promenades

Public transport within the city consists of buses and a tramway, the latter opened in 2011. There is also a bikeshare program, Zébullo.

The Canal de l'Aisne à la Marne is a waterway. There is also an airport, Reims – Prunay Aerodrome, but it had, as of 2020, no commercial airline flights. Paris's Charles de Gaulle Airport is located 136 km south west of Reims.

== Parks and gardens ==
Among the parks and gardens of Reims are the Parc de Champagne, where a Monument to the Heroes of the Black Army is located.

Next to the main train station, there is the Hautes Promenades, which is a park equipped with leisure facilities such as swings, hammocks, a carousel, in-ground trampolines, and a water park.

Smaller gardens and parks are also peppered throughout Reims, such as Jardin Le Vergeur, Parc Léo-Lagrange, and the Parc Saint-Remi which next to the Basilica of Saint-Remi.

== Higher education ==
The Institut d'Études politiques de Paris, the leading French university in social and political sciences, also known as SciencesPo Paris, opened a new campus in the former Jesuit College of Reims in 2010. It hosts both the Europe-Africa and Europe-America Program with more than 1,500 students in the respective programs. Aside from its Jesuit architecture, the campus also features the oldest grape vines in France, which are harvested every year by the City of Reims and are not at the disposal of students or visitors. In 2012 the first Reims Model United Nations was launched, which gathered 200 international students from all the Sciences Po campuses. Daniel Rondeau, the ambassador of France to UNESCO and a French writer, is the patron of the event.

The URCA (Université de Reims Champagne-Ardenne) was founded in 1548. This multidisciplinary university develops innovative, fundamental, and applied research. It provides more than 18,000 students in Reims (22,000 in Champagne-Ardenne) with a wide initial undergraduate studies program which corresponds to society's needs in all domains of the knowledge. The university also accompanies independent or company-backed students in continuing professional development training.

NEOMA Business School (former Reims Management School) is also one of the main schools in Reims. The Advanced Business School of Reims was created in 1928. It took the name Reims Management School in 2000.

== Notable residents ==
Those born in Reims include:

- Adolphe d'Archiac (1802–1868), geologist and paleontologist
- Jean Baudrillard (1929–2007), cultural theorist and philosopher
- Olivier de Benoist (born 1974), comedian
- Nicolas Bergier (1567–1623), scholar of Roman roads
- Brodinski (born 1987), musical artist and DJ
- Roger Caillois (1913–1978), intellectual
- Jean-Baptiste Colbert (1619–1683), Minister of Finance from 1665 to 1683 under the reign of Louis XIV
- Eugène Courmeaux (1817–1902), librarian of Reims, fervent republican
- Anne-Sophie Da Costa (1982), boxer
- Jean Del Val (1891–1975), actor
- Rose Delaunay (born 1857), opera singer
- Jean-Baptiste Drouet, Count d'Erlon (1765–1844), marshal of France and soldier in Napoleon's army
- Hugo Ekitike (born 2002), professional footballer
- Paul Fort (1872–1960), poet
- Nicolas Eugène Géruzez (1799–1865), critic
- Pauline Ferrand-Prévot (born 1992), world champion cyclist
- Nicolas de Grigny (1672–1703), organist and composer
- Maurice Halbwachs (1877–1945), philosopher and sociologist
- Kyan Khojandi (born 1982), comedian, actor and screenwriter
- Jean Lévesque de Burigny (1692–1785), historian
- Marie-Claire Jamet (born 1933), classical harpist
- Guillaume de Machaut (1300–1377), composer and poet (Machaut was most likely born in Reims or nearby; he spent most of his adult life there)
- Henri Marteau (1874–1934), violinist and composer
- Merolilan of Rheims, Irish cleric
- Olivier Métra (1830–1889), composer, conductor
- Maurice Pézard (1876–1923), archaeologist and assyriologist
- Robert Pires (born 1973), World Cup winner, footballer for Arsenal and for Villarreal CF
- Patrick Poivre d'Arvor (born 1947), television journalist and writer
- Jean-Baptiste de la Salle (1651–1719), Catholic saint, teacher and educational reformer
- Jules de Saint-Pol (1810–1855), general
- Émile Senart (1847–1928), indologist
- Michelle Vignes (c. 1926–2012) photographer and photojournalist
- Adeline Wuillème (born 1975), foil fencer
- Yuksek (born 1977), electronic music producer, remixer, singer and DJ

== Climate ==
Reims has an oceanic climate (Köppen Cfb), influenced by its inland position. This renders that although the maritime influence moderates averages, it nevertheless is prone to hot and cold extremes in certain instances. Reims has a relatively gloomy climate due to the said maritime influence and the dominance of low-pressure systems for much of the year. In spite of this, the amount of precipitation is fairly limited.

Climate data for Reims (1991–2020)
Month	Jan	Feb	Mar	Apr	May	Jun	Jul	Aug	Sep	Oct	Nov	Dec	Year
Record high °C (°F)	16.6 (61.9)	21.6 (70.9)	24.0 (75.2)	29.4 (84.9)	32.4 (90.3)	38.3 (100.9)	41.1 (106.0)	39.3 (102.7)	35.5 (95.9)	27.5 (81.5)	21.0 (69.8)	16.7 (62.1)	41.1 (106.0)
Mean daily maximum °C (°F)	6.4 (43.5)	7.7 (45.9)	12.0 (53.6)	15.7 (60.3)	19.3 (66.7)	22.6 (72.7)	25.2 (77.4)	24.9 (76.8)	20.8 (69.4)	15.9 (60.6)	10.1 (50.2)	6.9 (44.4)	15.7 (60.3)
Daily mean °C (°F)	3.5 (38.3)	4.2 (39.6)	7.2 (45.0)	10.0 (50.0)	13.7 (56.7)	16.8 (62.2)	19.2 (66.6)	18.8 (65.8)	15.3 (59.5)	11.6 (52.9)	6.9 (44.4)	4.2 (39.6)	11.0 (51.8)
Mean daily minimum °C (°F)	0.6 (33.1)	0.6 (33.1)	2.4 (36.3)	4.3 (39.7)	8.1 (46.6)	11.0 (51.8)	13.0 (55.4)	12.7 (54.9)	9.7 (49.5)	7.2 (45.0)	3.8 (38.8)	1.4 (34.5)	6.3 (43.3)
Record low °C (°F)	−22.3 (−8.1)	−21.0 (−5.8)	−12.8 (9.0)	−7.7 (18.1)	−2.6 (27.3)	−0.4 (31.3)	1.2 (34.2)	0.9 (33.6)	−2.2 (28.0)	−8.6 (16.5)	−11.5 (11.3)	−19.6 (−3.3)	−22.3 (−8.1)
Average precipitation mm (inches)	47.2 (1.86)	41.4 (1.63)	43.1 (1.70)	39.8 (1.57)	56.9 (2.24)	55.6 (2.19)	59.7 (2.35)	56.4 (2.22)	44.8 (1.76)	48.2 (1.90)	49.7 (1.96)	59.4 (2.34)	601.8 (23.69)
Average precipitation days (≥ 1.0 mm)	10.2	9.7	9.1	8.5	9.8	9.3	8.3	8.2	7.9	8.4	9.9	11.7	110.9
Mean monthly sunshine hours	62.9	81.9	140.5	186.6	214.2	222.1	228.8	216.7	169.6	115.0	65.5	53.3	1,758.8
Source: Météo Climat

== Twin towns – sister cities ==
Reims is twinned with:

- Florence, Italy (1954)
- (Republic of the Congo) Brazzaville, Congo (1961)
- Canterbury, England, United Kingdom (1962)
- Salzburg, Austria (1964)
- Aachen, Germany (1967)
- Arlington County, United States (2004)
- Kutná Hora, Czech Republic (2008)
- Nagoya, Japan (2018)

== See also ==
- Archbishop of Reims
- Battle of Reims
- Biscuit rose de Reims
- Champagne (province)
- Champagne Riots
- Reims Aviation
