= Battle of Reims =

Battle of Reims (also Battle of Rheims) may refer to:

- Battle of Reims (356), between the Roman army and the Alemanni.
- Battle of Reims (1814), between French forces under Napoleon and a Russian-Prussian force.
- Battle of Reims (1918), between Germany and the allied forces during World War I.
