= List of châteaux in Picardy =

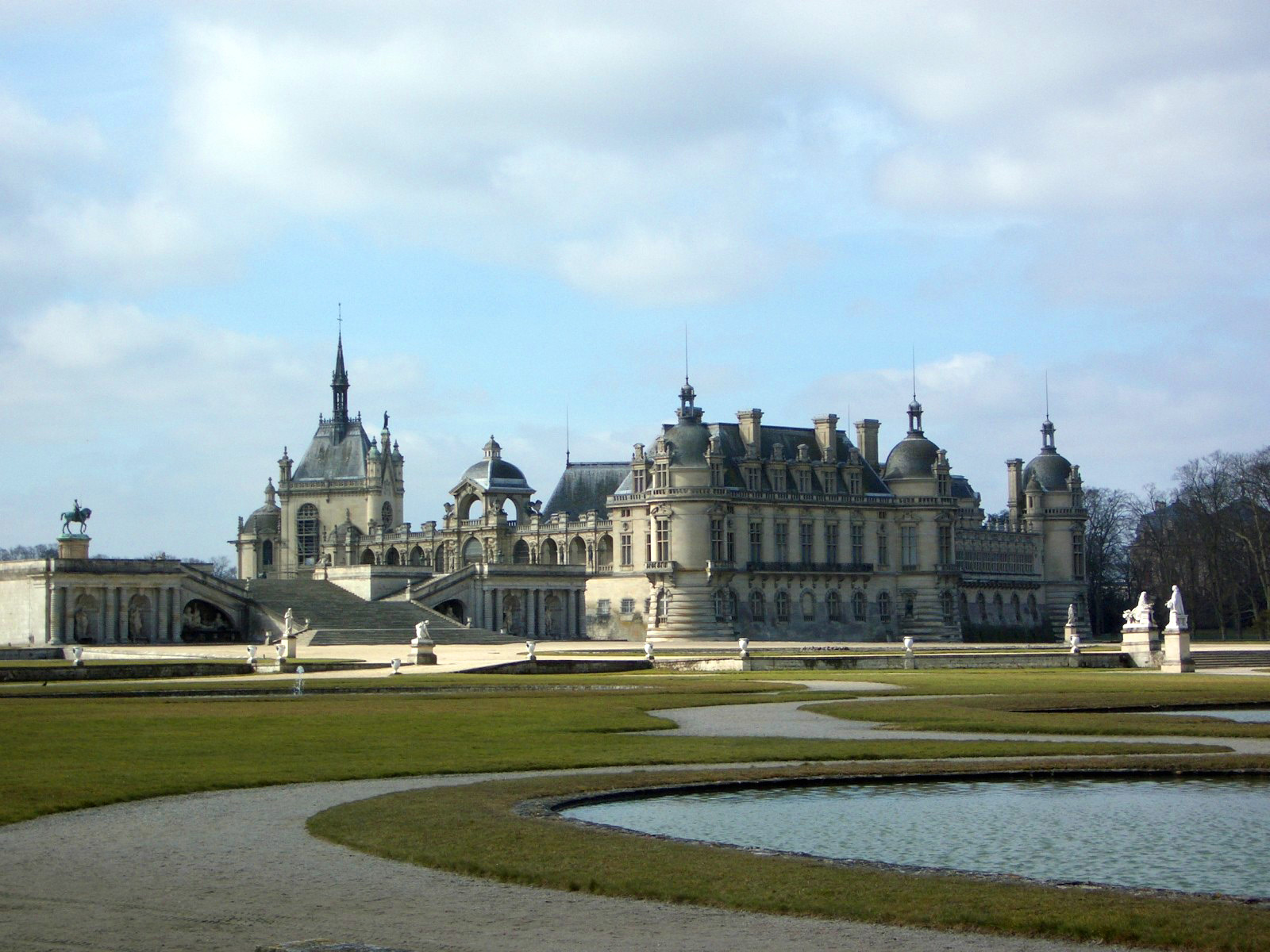
Château de Chantilly

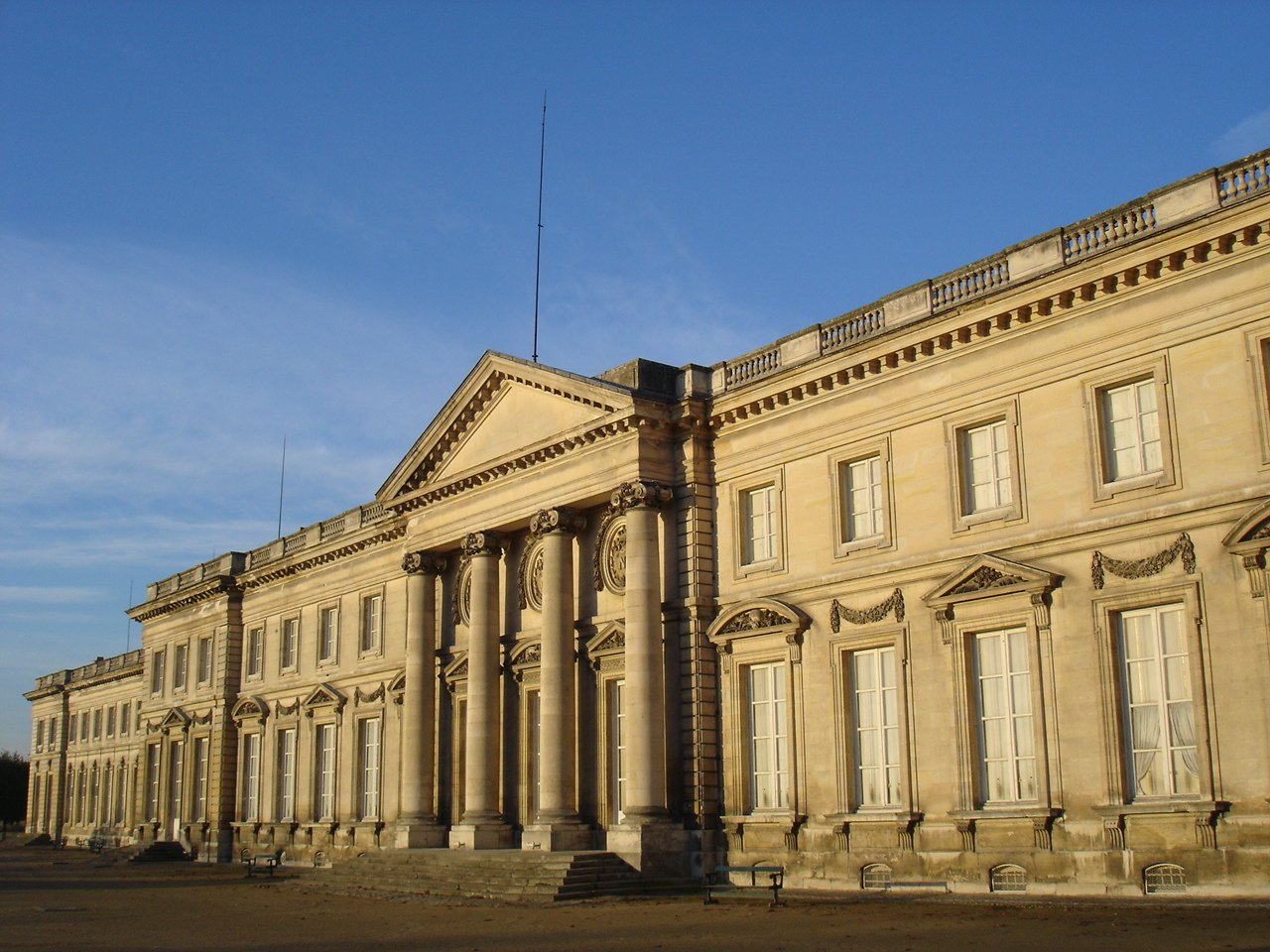
Château de Compiègne

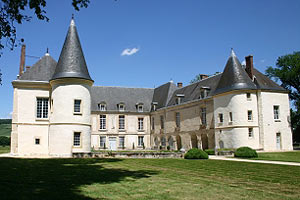
Château de Condé

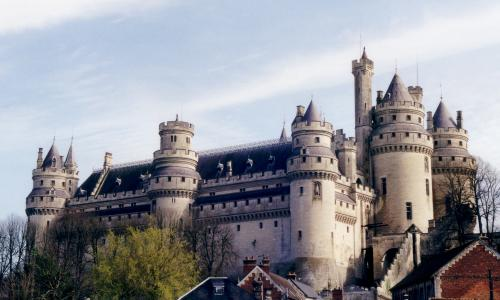
Château de Pierrefonds

This is a list of châteaux in the former French region of Picardy.

== Aisne ==
- Château d'Autremencourt in Autremencourt
- Château de Blérancourt in Blérancourt
- Château de Caulaincourt in Caulaincourt
- Château de Chailvet in Royaucourt-et-Chailvet
- Château de Château-Thierry in Château-Thierry
- Château de Condé in Condé-en-Brie, classed as Monument historique, open to visitors
- Château de Coucy in Coucy-le-Château-Auffrique
- Château de Fère in Fère-en-Tardenois
- Château de La Ferté-Milon in La Ferté-Milon
- Château François Ier in Villers-Cotterêts
- Château de Guise in Guise (castle)
- Château de Jouaignes in Jouaignes
- Château de Marchais in Marchais
- Château de Mazancourt in Vivières
- Château de Montgobert in Montgobert
- Château de Noüe in Villers-Cotterêts
- Château du Nouvion-en-Thiérache, in Le Nouvion-en-Thiérache
- Château d'Oigny-en-Valois in Oigny-en-Valois
- Château de Quierzy in Quierzy
- Château de Septmonts in Septmonts
- Château de Vadancourt in Maissemy
- Donjon de Vic-sur-Aisne in Vic-sur-Aisne
- Château de Villiers-Saint-Denis, Villiers-Saint-Denis

== Oise ==
- Château d'Alincourt in Parnes (bought in January 2009 by Alain Duménil)
- Château de Bains in Boulogne-la-Grasse
- Château de Boulogne-la-Grasse in Boulogne-la-Grasse
- Château de Bresles in Bresles
- Château de Chantilly in Chantilly
- Château de Compiègne in Compiègne
- Château d'Ermenonville in Ermenonville. Jean-Jacques Rousseau died there in 1778, while going for a walk.
- Château du Fayel in Fayel
- Château de Lamorlaye in Lamorlaye
- Château de Longueil-Sainte-Marie in Longueil-Sainte-Marie
- Château Mennechet in Chiry-Ourscamp
- Donjon de Clermont-en-Beauvaisis in Clermont-de-l'Oise
- Château de Mello in Mello
- Château du Meux at Meux
- Château de Monceaux in Monceaux
- Château de Montataire in Montataire
- Château Mont-Royal in La Chapelle-en-Serval
- Château de Montvillargenne in Gouvieux
- Château de Nointel in Nointel
- Château d'Ognon in Ognon
- Palais épiscopal in Beauvais
- Château de Pierrefonds in Pierrefonds
- Château de Senlis in Senlis
- Château de Trie in Trie-Château
- Château de Troissereux in Troissereux
- Château de Vallière in Mortefontaine
- Château de Verneuil-en-Halatte in Verneuil-en-Halatte
- Château de Versigny in Versigny
- Donjon de Vez in Vez

== Somme ==
- Château d'Aveluy in Aveluy
- Château de Bagatelle, à Abbeville, classed as Monument historique, visitable
- Château de Bailleul in Bailleul
- Château de Beaucourt-en-Santerre in Beaucourt-en-Santerre
- Château de Bertangles in Bertangles
- Château de Boves in Boves
- Château de Cayeux-en-Santerre in Cayeux-en-Santerre
- Château de Chaulnes in Chaulnes (ruin)
- Château de Davenescourt in Davenescourt
- Château d'Eaucourt-sur-Somme in Eaucourt-sur-Somme
- Château de Flixecourt classed as Monument historique, visitable
- Château de Folleville (Somme) in Folleville
- Château de Grivesnes, à Grivesnes (ruin)
- Château fort de Ham in Ham, classed as Monument historique, visitable
- Château d'Heilly in Heilly
- Château de Long in Long (Somme), classed as Monument historique
- Château de Mailly-Raineval in Mailly-Raineval
- Château de Moreuil in Moreuil
- Château de Péronne (Somme) in Péronne
- Château de Picquigny in Picquigny, classed as Monument historique, visitable
- Château du Plouy in Vismes(built in the Renaissance)
- Château de Pont-Remy in Pont-Remy (built in the Renaissance)
- Château de Rambures in Rambures, classed as Monument historique, visitable
- Château de Tilloloy in Tilloloy
- Château de Vismes in Vismes
- Château de Warvillers in Warvillers

== See also ==
- List of castles in France
