= Nicole Wild =

French musicologist (1929–2017)

Nicole Wild (20 June 1929 – 29 December 2017) was a French musicologist, chief curator at the Paris Opera Library and Museum, and a specialist in the history and iconography of opera in France in the 19th century.

== Early life and education ==
Born in Reims, Wild received her musical training at the Conservatoire de Reims (music theory, harmony, counterpoint, music history, music teaching certificate in 1953, first organ prize in 1955), where she taught music education in schools, technical college and music school from 1953 to 1962. For the organ, she also received instruction from André Marchal and completed internships at the Saint-Maximin Organ Academy. She was organist of the Temple protestant de Reims from 1955 to 1962, then of the Palaiseau temple from 1967. From 1968 to 1973, she was also chief editor of the magazine "Musique et chant", published by the Federation of music and song of French Protestantism.

She studied at the University of Paris, where she obtained a certificate in music history in 1962, and at the Conservatoire de Paris. Admitted to Norbert Dufourcq's music history class in October 1956, she obtained a second prize in 1958 and a first prize in musicology in 1961, with a thesis devoted to La Vie musicale en France sous la Régence d'après le Mercure de France.

== Career ==
In 1959, she was hired on contract at the Conservatoire de Paris library (until 1960) and as an assistant in the Music Department of the Bibliothèque Nationale de France, where she was assigned to the Opera library-museum, which she would never leave again. She became successively deputy and assistant librarian from 1962 to 1982, full curator from October 1985 and finally chief curator in 1993.

Wild undertook important cataloguing work at the Opera Library, accumulating and organizing a wealth of information on musical and iconographic collections. This in-depth and systematic work allowed her to publish catalogues of remarkable musical value: Le Cirque (with Tristan Rémy), 1969; Les Arts du spectacle en France, Affiches illustrées, 1850-1950 : catalogue, 1976; Décors et costumes du XIXe siècle, volume I: Opéra de Paris, 1987; Décors et costumes du XIXe siècle, volume II: théâtres et décorateurs, collections de la bibliothèque-musée de l'Opéra, 1993. She also contributed to the enhancement of these collections by organizing various exhibitions, whose catalogues are valuable working tools: Diaghilev: les Ballets russes (with Jean-Michel Nectoux), 1979; Auber et l'opéra romantique (with Yves Gérard and Anne-Charlotte Rémond), 1982; Wagner et la France (with Martine Kahane), 1983; Les Ballets russes à l'Opéra (with Martine Kahane), 1999.

== Research and publications ==
Wild has also carried out fundamental historical work on the theatres of Paris. First of all at the École pratique des hautes études, where in 1980 she presented a thesis, under the direction of François Lesure, on Les Théâtres parisiens entre 1807 et 1848. Then at the University Paris IV-Sorbonne, where in 1987 she obtained a doctorate in literature, prepared under the direction of Jean Mongrédien, with a thesis entitled Musique et théâtres parisiens face au pouvoir (1807-1864) : avec inventaire historique des salles. Part of this work provided the material for her Dictionnaire des théâtres parisiens au XIXe siècle (1989), a reference work that is constantly consulted by all specialists and whose new edition in 2012, considerably increased, covers the period 1807-1914. Including all Parisian theatres, music having inevitably intervened in each at one time or another, it provides each theatre with a considerable amount of information (origin, assignments, artistic personnel, type of production, operating regime), making it possible, as Joël-Marie Fauquet writes in his preface, "to capture, in its breadth and diversity, the activity of a cultural sector which, having been maintained in close freedom until 1864, is surprisingly intense". And he concludes, evaluating the enormous documentation contained in this opus: "Nicole Wild has the enviable privilege of proving that a single book can sometimes replace a library."

Among these theatres, she was particularly interested in the Opéra-Comique, whose musical collection has long been preserved in the Salle Favart. She helped to draw attention to its interest and richness and to prepare it for deposit at the Opera Library-Museum. Based on these first-hand documents, as well as on the archives of the second largest opera house in France, she published in 2005, with the collaboration of David Charlton for the 18th century, a work on its repertoire, which covers almost three centuries of productions: Théâtre de l'Opéra-Comique, Paris: repertoire 1762-1972. At the same time, she became interested in the iconography of this lyrical genre and its theatre, publishing in 2002, in collaboration with Raphaëlle Legrand, an illustrated book on their history: Regards sur l'opéra-comique: trois siècles de vie théâtrale.

== List of works ==
- (with Tristan Rémy), Le Cirque, Paris: Bibliothèque nationale, 1969, 167 p.
- Les Arts du spectacle en France, Affiches illustrées, 1850-1950 : catalogue, Paris: Bibliothèque nationale, 1976, 454 p.
- (with Jean-Michel Nectoux), Diaghilev : les Ballets russes, [catalogue of the Bibliothèque nationale exhibition between May 17 and July 29, 1979], Paris: Bibliothèque nationale, 1979, XII-166 p.
- (with Anne-Charlotte Rémond), Auber et l'opéra romantique : 29 janvier 1782-29 janvier 1982, [catalogue of an exhibition in 1982, 63 p.]
- (with Martine Kahane), Wagner et la France, [catalogue of the exhibition at the Théâtre national de l'Opéra in Paris between 26 October 1983 and 26 January 1984, organised by the Bibliothèque nationale and the Théâtre national de l'Opéra de Paris], Paris: Herscher, 1983, 175 p.
- Décors et costumes du XIXe siècle, volume I: Opéra de Paris, Paris, Bibliothèque nationale, 1987, 308 p.
- Dictionnaire des théâtres parisiens au XIXe siècle, preface by Jean Mongrédien, Paris: Aux Amateurs de livres, 1989, 509 p.
- (with Martine Kahane) Les Ballets russes à l’Opéra, [catalogue of the exhibition at the Opéra library-museum in Paris between 15 January and 20 May 1992], Paris: Éditions Hazan, Bibliothèque nationale, 1992, 199 p.
- Décors et costumes du XIXe siècle, volume II: théâtres et décorateurs, collections de la bibliothèque-musée de l'Opéra, Paris: Bibliothèque nationale, 1993, 381 p. (Prix Charles Blanc de l’Académie française, médaille de bronze, in 1994.)
- (with Herbert Schneider) La Muette de Portici: kritische Ausgabe des Librettos und Dokumentation der ersten Inszenierung, Tübingen : Stauffenburg-Verl., 1993, 232-[20] p.
- (with Raphaëlle Legrand) Regards sur l’opéra-comique : trois siècles de vie théâtrale, Paris: CNRS éditions, 2002, 290 p.
- (with David Charlton) Théâtre de l’Opéra-Comique Paris : répertoire 1762-1972, Sprimont: P. Mardaga, 2005, 552 p.
- Dictionnaire des théâtres parisiens : 1807-1914, foreword by Joël-Marie Fauquet, [revised edition], Lyon: Symétrie, [Venice]: Palazzetto Bru Zane, 2012, 526 p.
