= International Congress of Progressive Artists =

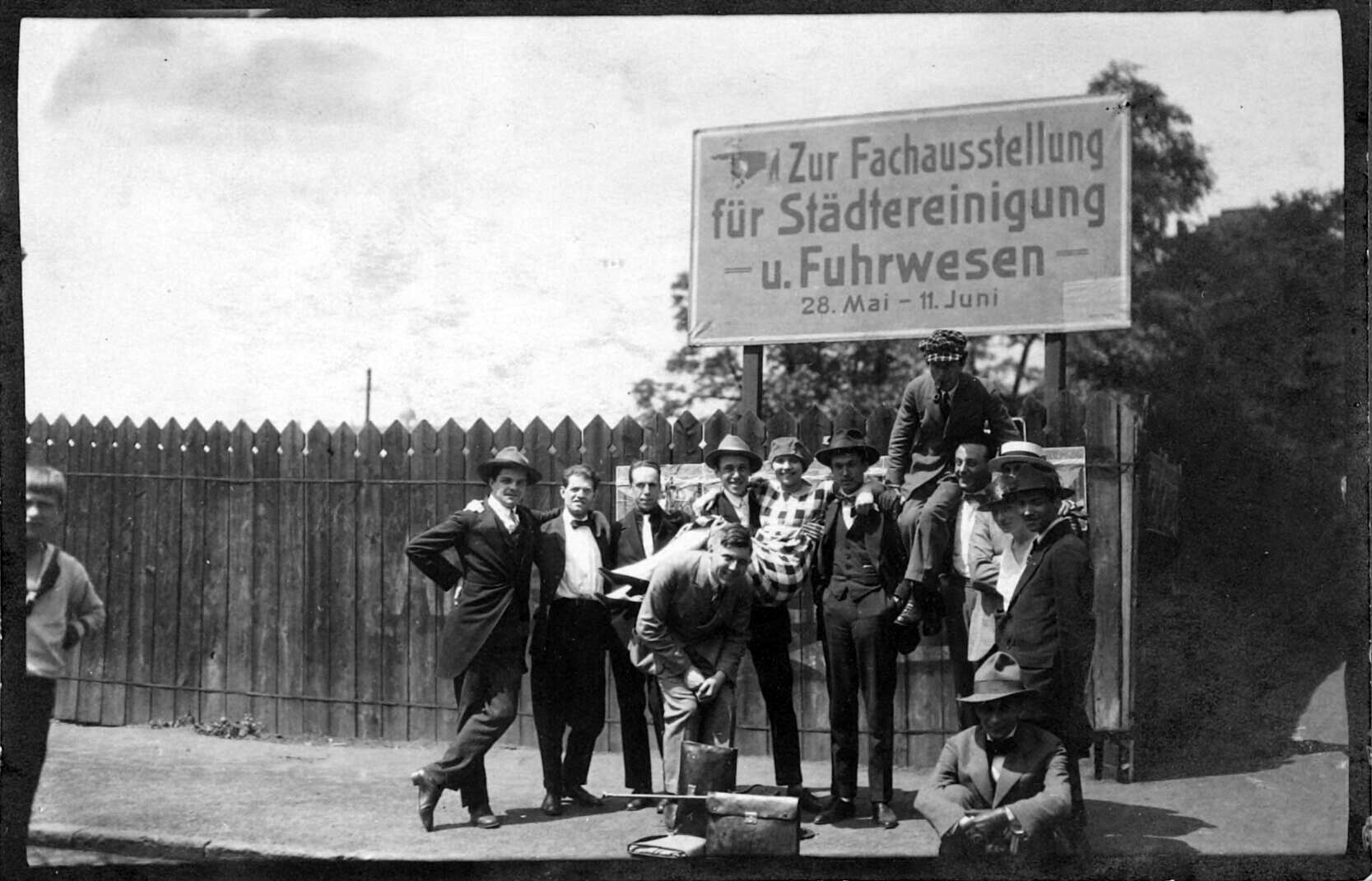
Participants in the International Congress of Progressive Artists (from left to right: unknown boy, Werner Graeff, Raoul Hausmann, Theo van Doesburg, Cornelis van Eesteren, Hans Richter, Nelly van Doesburg, unknown (De Pistoris?), El Lissitzky, Ruggero Vasari, Otto Freundlich (?), Hannah Höch, Franz Seiwert and Stanislav Kubicki).

International Congress of Progressive Artists was organised by Young Rhineland (Junge Rheinland), with help from the November Group, the Darmstadt Secession and the Dresden Secession in Düsseldorf, 29-31 May 1922. The aim of creating an international organisation of radical artists led to differing conceptions of how this should be done. Theo van Doesburg wrote "A short review of the proceedings" which included a proclamation calling for a permanent, universal, international exhibition of art from everywhere in the world and an annual universal, international music festival. With the slogan Artists of all nationalities unite’ they declared that "Art must become international or it will perish". According to van Doesburg, when those who refused to sign this proclamation were threatened with exclusion, this led to uproar.

== Intervention by the International Constructivist Faction ==
The conflict around the proclamation was, according to van Doesburg, was resolved by the International Constructivist Faction, which consisted of van Doesburg himself, El Lissitzky and Hans Richter. In the end the proclamation was signed by the following groups and individuals:

- The Young Rhineland, Düsseldorf
- Dresden Secession
- November Group, Berlin
- Darmstadt Secession
- Creative Group, Dresden
- Theodor Däubler
- Else Lasker-Schüler, Berlin
- Herbert Eulenberg
- Oskar Kokoschka
- Christian Rohlfs, Hagen
- Romain Rolland
- Wassily Kandinsky
- Han Ryner
- Edouard Dujardin
- Marcel Millet
- Tristan Rémy
- Marek Schwarz
- Marcel Sauvage (Groupe l’Albatros)
- Paul Jamatty
- Enrico Prampolini
- Pere Créixams (listed as Pierre Creixamt)
- Henry Poulaille
- Maurice Wullens
- Pierre Larivière (Guilde des Artisans de l’Avenir)
- Josef Quessnel
- Germain Delafons (Les Compagnons)
- Stanisław Kubicki
- A. Feder
- Jankel Adler
- Arthur Fischer
