= Tristan Rémy =

French proletarian writer and circus historian

Tristan Rémy (born Raymond Marcel Desprez) (24 January 1897, Blérancourt – 23 November 1977, Mériel) was a French writer and circus historian. He was a proponent of proletarian literature.

His father was a chef and he worked at the Porte de la Chapelle freight terminus.

He met Franz Seiwert at one of the organising meetings for the International Congress of Progressive Artists which they both attended in May 1922. Rémy and signed the "Founding Proclamation of the Union of Progressive International Artists"

He was associated with Henry Poulaille whose Nouvel âge littéraire provided the basis for the magazine Nouvel Âge, Bulletin des écrivains prolétariens. However while not being directly involved in the organisation of proletarian writers, his writing reflected his interest in Marxism and he was close to both the French Communist Party and the Association des Écrivains et Artistes Révolutionnaires (Association of Revolutionary Writers and Artists).

After the Second world War, he specialised in books about the circus.

== Published works ==
- Porte Clignancourt, Rieder, 1928
- À l'ancien tonnelier, Valois, 1931
- Sainte-Marie des Flots, Valois, 1932
- Faubourg Saint-Antoine, Gallimard, 1936
- La Grande lutte, Éditions sociales internationales, 1937
- Les Clowns, Grasset, 1945, republished with additions, Grasset, 2002
- L'Homme du canal, J. Vigneau, 1947
- Le Cirque et ses étoiles, Artis, 1949
- Le Cirque Bonaventure, Éditions de la Paix, 1952
- Jean-Gaspard Deburau, L'Arche, 1954
- Entrées clownesques, L'Arche, 1962
- Georges Wague, Éditions Georges Girard, 1964
- Le temps des cerises (Jean-Baptiste Clément), Éditeurs français réunis, 1968
- La Commune à Montmartre, Éditions sociales, 1970
