= Pierre Larivière =

French artist and anarchist

Pierre Larivière (1884? -1932) was a French anarchist writer, illustrator and painter.

Prior to the First World War Larivière contributed to several anarchist publications, such as Jean Grave's Les Temps Nouveaux. He was drafted during the war and served in the 27th company of the 369th line regiment. He corresponded with Grave during 1914–15, but this stopped in January 1915 when he disagreed with Grave's support for Kropotkin's view that the war was a war of liberation. Rather, he supported the pacifist views of Romain Rolland.

In May 1922 he attended the International Congress of Progressive Artists and signed the "Founding Proclamation of the Union of Progressive International Artists".

== Postcards illustrated by Larivière ==
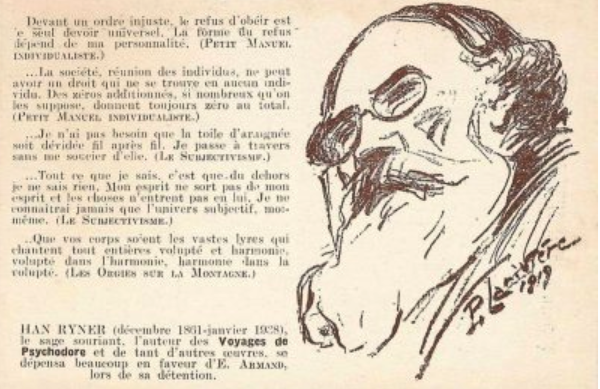
Han Ryner (1919)

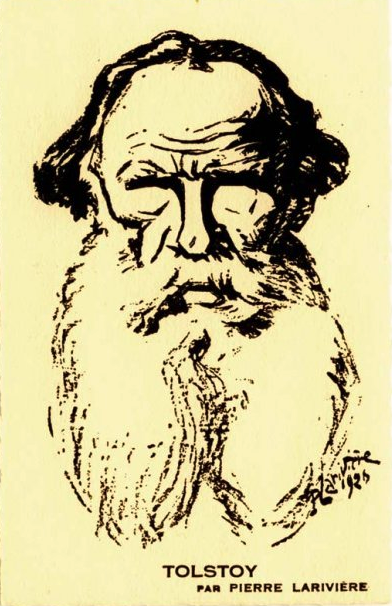
Leo Tolstoy (1924)

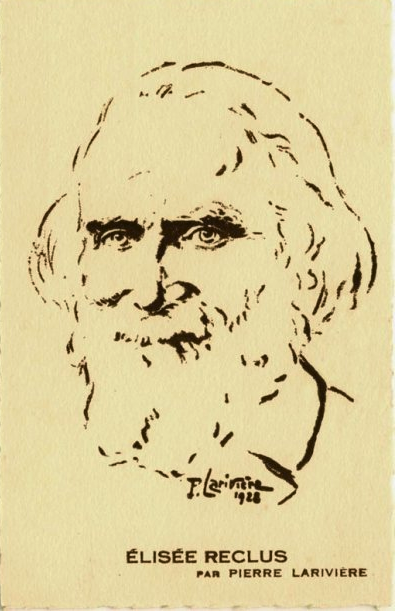
Élisée Reclus (1924)
