= Charles Letrosne =

French architect and writer

Charles Antoine Letrosne
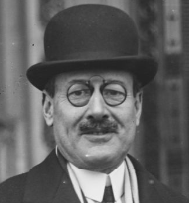
- Born: 5 April 1868; Paris, France
- Died: 9 August 1939 (aged 71); Saint-Nom-la-Bretèche, Yvelines, France
- Occupation: Architect
- Known for: Murs et toits pour le pays de chez nous (1923).

Charles Antoine Letrosne (5 April 1868 – 9 August 1939) was a French architect and writer known as the author of the influential three-volume Murs et toits pour le pays de chez nous (1923.

== Life ==
Charles Antoine Letrosne was born on 5 April 1868 in the 8th arrondissement of Paris. His parents were Paul Ernest Letrosne (1827–1902), an architect and professor at the École nationale supérieure des arts décoratifs, and Augustine Marin (1825–1884). He also became an architect. On 27 May 1895 he married Caroline Geneviève Jenny Penicaud (1874–1925). They had two boys and two girls. The boys, Daniel Paul Raoul Letrosne (1896–1941) and Guy (Guillaume) Letrosne (1908–88) both became architects.

Charles Letrosne was made Chief Architect of Civil Buildings and National Palaces. He was an officer of the Legion of Honor. He died on 9 August 1939 at Le Val Martin, Saint-Nom-la-Bretèche, Yvelines, Île-de-France at the age of 71.

== Work ==
Letrosne designed the Temple protestant de Reims in a flamboyant neo-Gothic style influenced by Eugène Viollet-le-Duc. It was modeled on the Temple de l'Étoile in Paris. The layout is that of Latin cross, which is unusual in a church built for Protestants. The foundation stone was laid on 23 October 1921, and the temple was dedicated on 24 June 1923. Letrosne was the co-designer (with his son Daniel) of the zoo in the Bois de Vincennes in Paris in 1934. He was the first chief architect of the Paris World Exhibition of 1937.

== Publications ==
- Letrosne, Charles (1923). Murs et toits pour les pays de chez-nous. Vol. 1–3. Niestlé.

== Sources ==
- Bourgouin, Anthone (2015). "Charles Antoine LETROSNE". Geneanet.
- Bricout, Didier (2015). "Reims : le temple protestant".
- Champenois, Jean-Pierre; Bricout, Didier; Popp, Rudi (2015). "Reims : historique des temples" (in French).
- Robineau, Frédéric (1 October 2010). "The zoo at Vincennes should not disappear !". The Art Tribune.
