= Pere Créixams =

Spanish painter

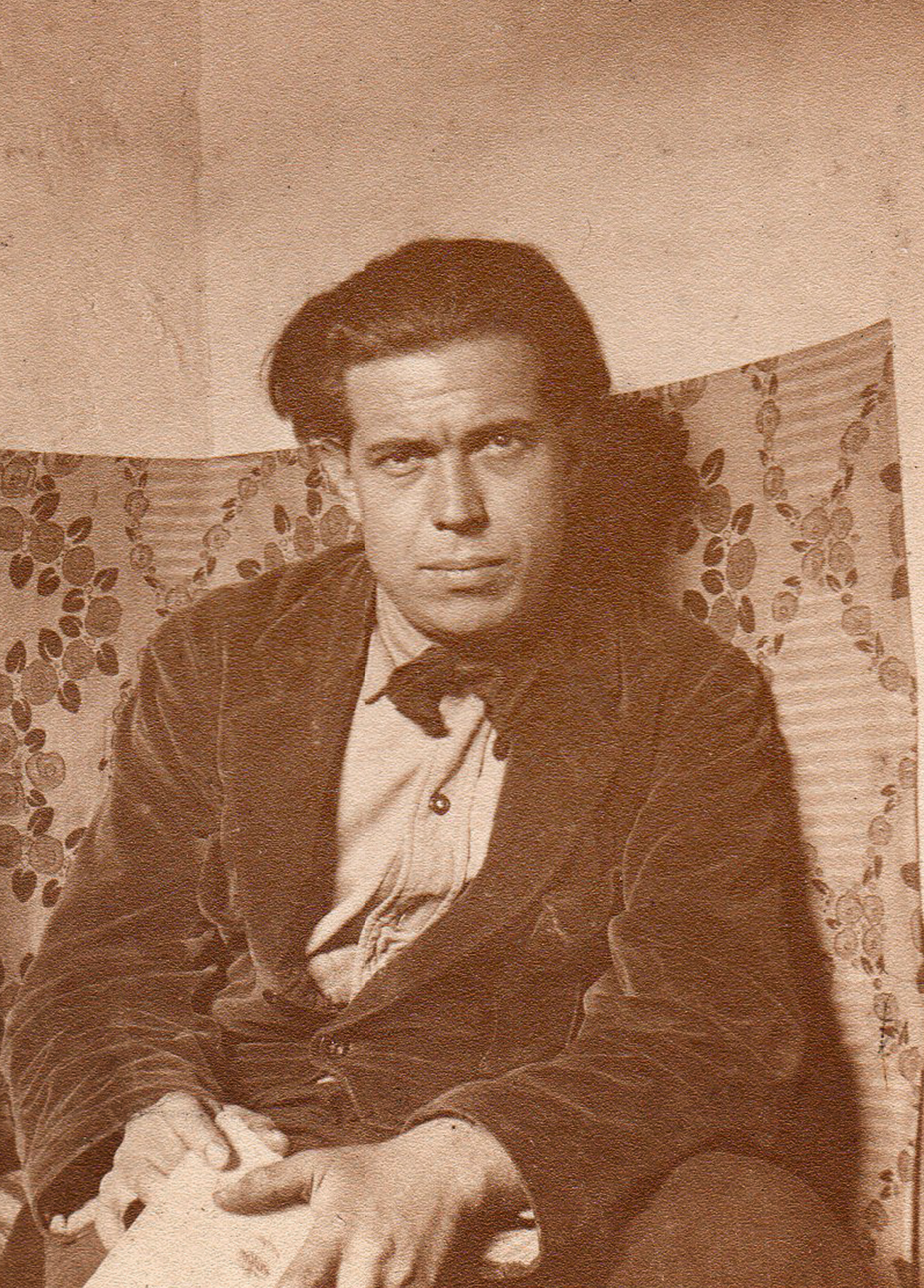

Pere Modesto Luis Creixams (9 November 1893, Barcelona – 5 March 1965, Barcelona) was a Spanish painter and illustrator.

In May 1922 he attended the International Congress of Progressive Artists and signed the "Founding Proclamation of the Union of Progressive International Artists" (listed as "Pierre Creixamt".)
