= Claude-Nicolas Le Cat =

French surgeon

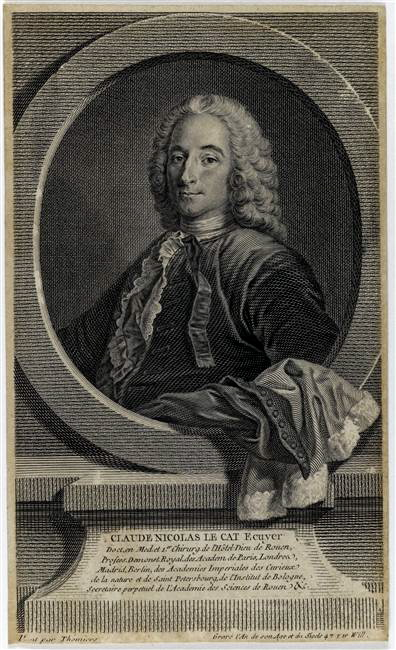
- Claude-Nicolas Le Cat
- Born: 6 September 1700; Blérancourt (France)
- Died: 20 August 1768 (aged 67); Rouen (France)
- Citizenship: France
- Known for: Lithotomy, cataract surgery.
- Spouse: Marie-Marguerite Champossin
- Scientific career
- Fields: Medicine, surgery
- Workplaces: Hôtel-Dieu hospital (Rouen)
- Thesis: (1733)

Claude-Nicolas Le Cat (6 September 1700 – 20 August 1768) was a French surgeon and science communicator.

== Biography ==
Le Cat was born in Blérancourt (Picardy). He was the son of Claude Le Cat, a surgeon, and Anne-Marie Méresse, the daughter of a surgeon. He studied anatomy and surgery first with his father then in Paris from 1726.

In 1728, he was appointed surgeon to the Archbishop of Rouen Louis de La Vergne-Montenard de Tressan, friend of Louis XV, then in 1731 deputy head surgeon at the Hôtel-Dieu hospital in Rouen when he was not yet Master surgeon.

He obtained his medical doctorate in Reims University in 1733, then became next year Master surgeon in Rouen.

He commenced lecturing on anatomy and surgery, and in 1736 received the title of royal professor and demonstrator. In 1744 he founded the "Académie royale des sciences, belles lettres et arts" in Rouen, becoming its lifelong secretary for the class of sciences and arts.

In 1742, he married Marie-Marguerite Champossin. Their only daughter, Charlotte-Bonne, married the surgeon Jean-Pierre David (fr), who succeeded Le Cat in all his offices.

Louis XV granted him the rank of écuyer in 1762 in recognition of his services.

He was a devout Catholic throughout his life. He died in Rouen in 1768 aged 67.

== Works ==
In 1731, his interest in replicating human anatomical forms and movements stimulated Vaucanson to begin work on his first automaton.

In 1732, he performed lateral lithotomy approach to removing bladder stones using the technique invented by Frère Jacques Beaulieu and improved by William Cheselden. He developed an instrument for lithotomy, the "Gorgeret cystotome". Le Cat deserve credit for the first removal of bladder polyp through the dilated urethra.

He also effected a great advance in cataract surgery.

His reputation in France and Europe is reflected by his numerous academy prizes, publications, and surgical notoriety.

== Bibliography ==
- Claude-Nicolas Le Cat (1744). Traité des sens (in French). chez J. Wetstein.
- Claude-Nicolas Le Cat (1745). Remarques sur les mémoires de l'Académie de chirurgie (in French).
- Claude-Nicolas Le Cat (1749). Pièces concernant l'opération de la taille: premier recueil qui traite principalement de cette opération pratiquée sur les femmes ... (in French). Dumesnil.
- Claude-Nicolas Le Cat (1750). A Physical Essay on the Senses. R. Griffiths.
- Claude-Nicolas Le Cat (1753). Sur les Pansemens rares ou fréquens (in French).
- Claude Nicolas Le Cat (1753). Mémoire sur la sensibilité de la dure-mère, de la piemère, des periostes, des membranes, des ligamens, des tendons, etc (in French).
- Claude-Nicolas Le Cat (1753). Sur les playes faites par Armes à feu (in French).
- Claude Nicolas Le Cat; M. de Fontenelle (Bernard Le Bovier) (1759). Éloge de Monsieur de Fontenelle (in French). Chez J. N. Besongne.
- Claude-Nicolas Le Cat; Académie royale des sciences et belles lettres (Berlin, Germany) (1765). Traité de l'existence, de la nature et des propriétés du fluide des nerfs, et principalement de son action dans le mouvement musculaire: ouvrage couronné en 1753 par l'Académie de Berlin : suivi des dissertations sur la sensibilité des meninges, des tendons ... (in French).
- Claude-Nicolas Le Cat (1765). Nouveau système, sur la cause de l'évacuation périodique du sexe (in French).
- Cat, Claude-Nicolas Le (1765). Traité de la couleur de la peau humaine en général, de celle des nègres en particulier, et de la métamorphose d'une de ces couleurs en l'autre, soit de naissance, soit accidentellement: ouvrage divisé en trois parties (in French).
- Claude Nicolas Le Cat; Alexander Petrus Nahuys (1766). Parallèle de la taille latérale avec celle du lithotome-caché: suivi de deux dissertations, I. Sur l'adhérence des pierres à la vessie. II. Sur quelques nouveaux moyens de briser la pierre &c. Rey.
- Claude-Nicolas Le Cat (1768). Traité des sensations et des passions, en général et des sens en particulier: ouvrage divisé en deux parties (in French). Vallat-La-Chapelle.
- Claude-Nicolas Le Cat (1768). Cours abrégé d'ostéologie, de M. Le Cat (in French).
- Claude Nicolas Le Cat (1767). Oeuvres physiologiques: Traité des sensations et des passions et des sens en particulier avec planches et tableaux (in French).
- Claude-Nicolas Le Cat (1768). La théorie de l'ouie: supplément a cet article du traité des sens : ouvrage qui a remporté le prix triple proposé pour 1757 par l'Académie de Toulouse (in French). Chez Vallat-La-Chapelle.
- Claude Nicolas Le Cat; Jean Pierre David; Carl Gottlob Kühn (1787). Le Cats vermischte chirurgische Abhandlungen (in German). Weygand.
