= Joseph-Félix Bouchor =

French painter (1853–1937)

Joseph-Felix Bouchor
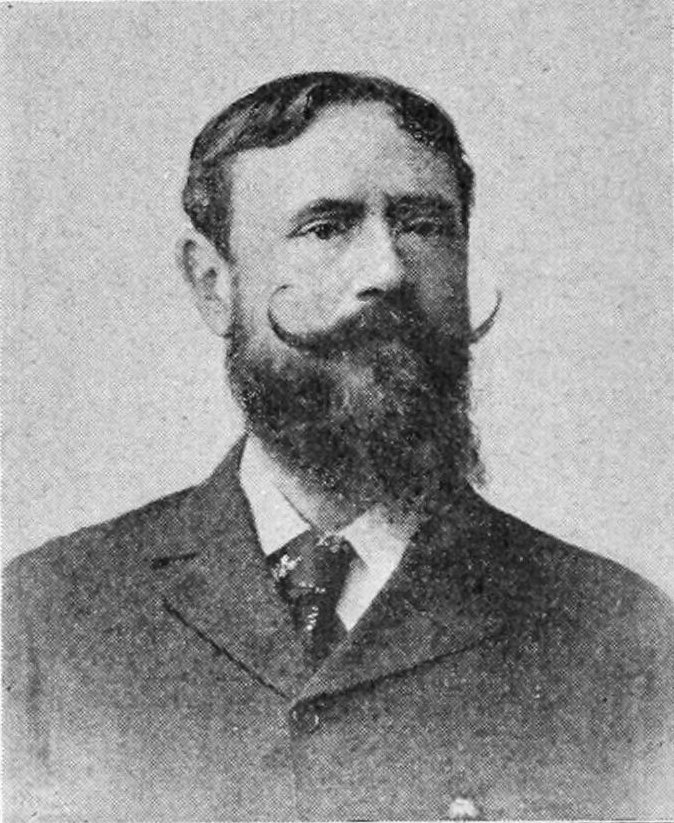
- the artist
- Born: Joseph-Félix Bouchor; 15 September 1853; Paris, France
- Died: 27 October 1937; Paris, France
- Known for: Painter

Joseph-Félix Bouchor (15 September 1853 – 27 October 1937) was a French painter noted for his portraits and his Orientalist themes.

== Biography ==
The artist was born in Paris. He studied at the Beaux-Arts. Joseph-Felix Bouchor exhibited his works at the Salon des Artistes Francais in 1878. During World War I, he was embedded with the allied troop and realized many military paintings depicting French and American infantry, cavalry and air forces in action on the frontline. He is famous for his portraits of General John Pershing (1860–1948), French President Georges Clemenceau and his illustrations of the American Expeditionary Force during World War I.

After the war, Joseph-Felix Bouchor travelled to North Africa and painted orientalist topics. His works belong to many public collections, including the Orsay Museum in Paris, the Museums of Beaux-Arts in Marseille, Angers, Vannes and Nantes, France. Many artworks belong to the collection of the musée national de la coopération Franco-américaine in Blérancourt, France.

Joseph-Félix Bouchor died in Paris in 1937.

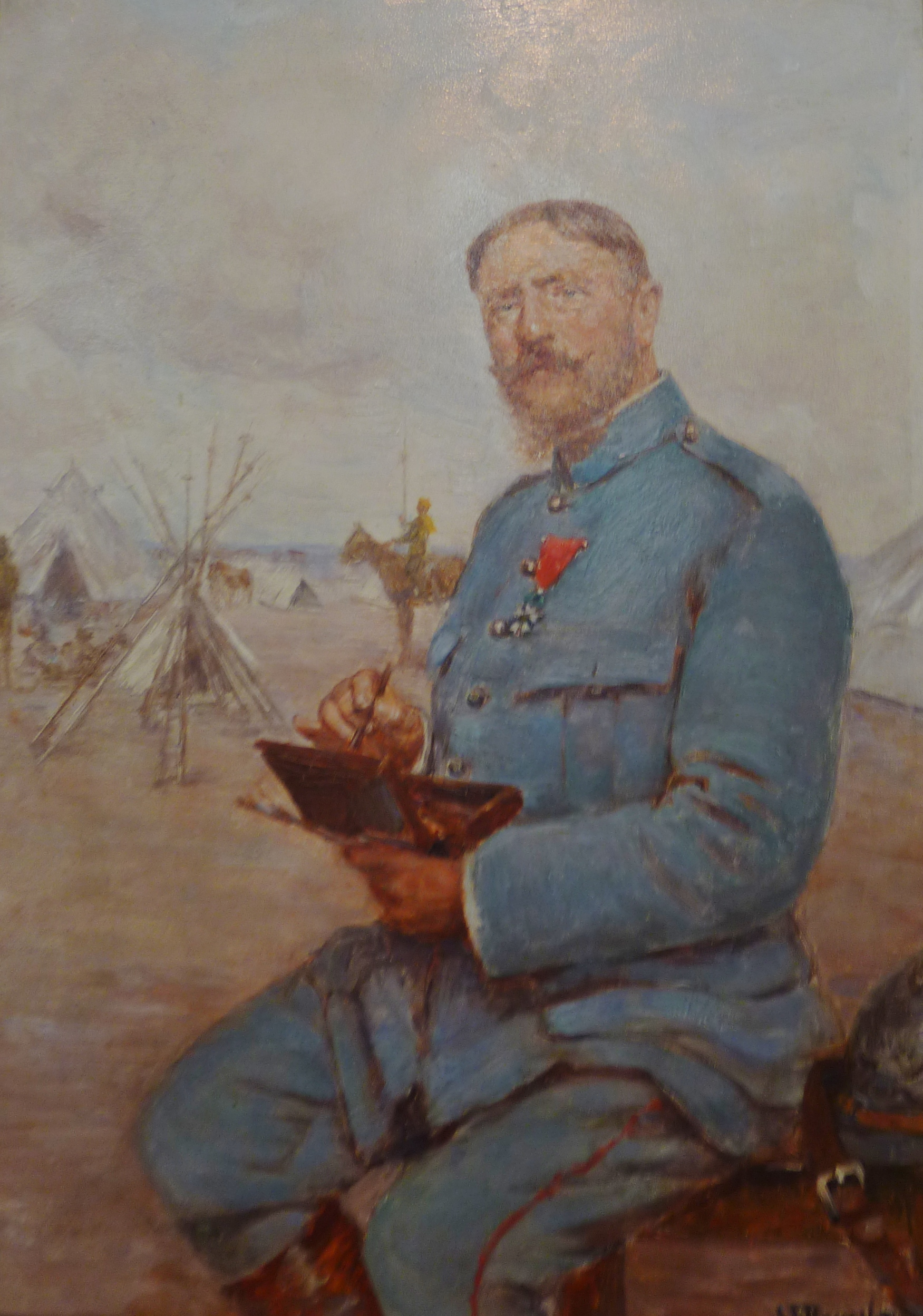
Self-portrait

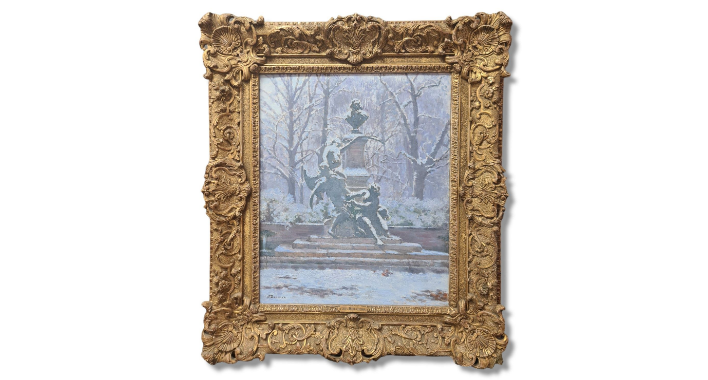

== Gallery ==
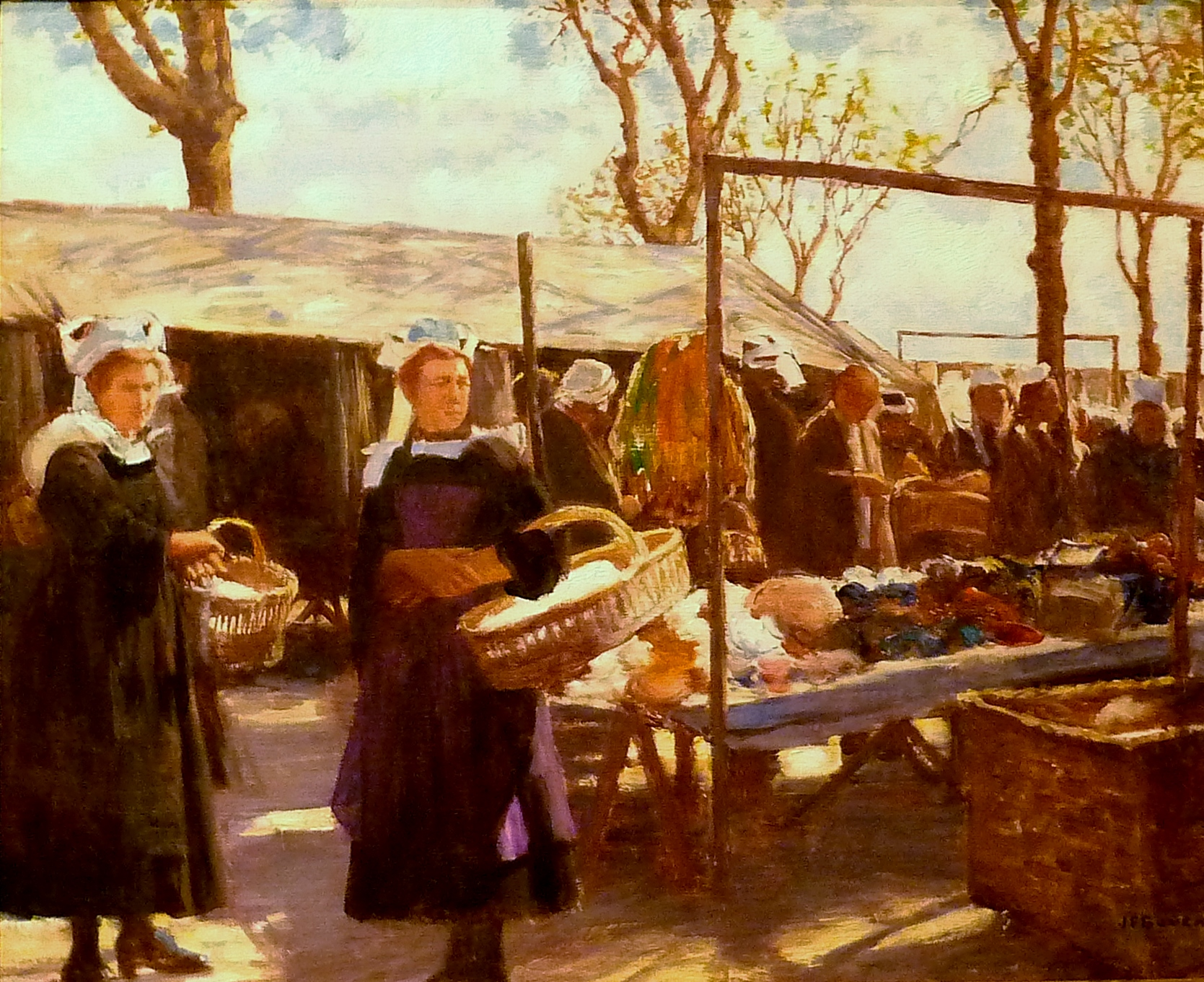
Marché à Concarneau (Musée des beaux-arts de Vannes)

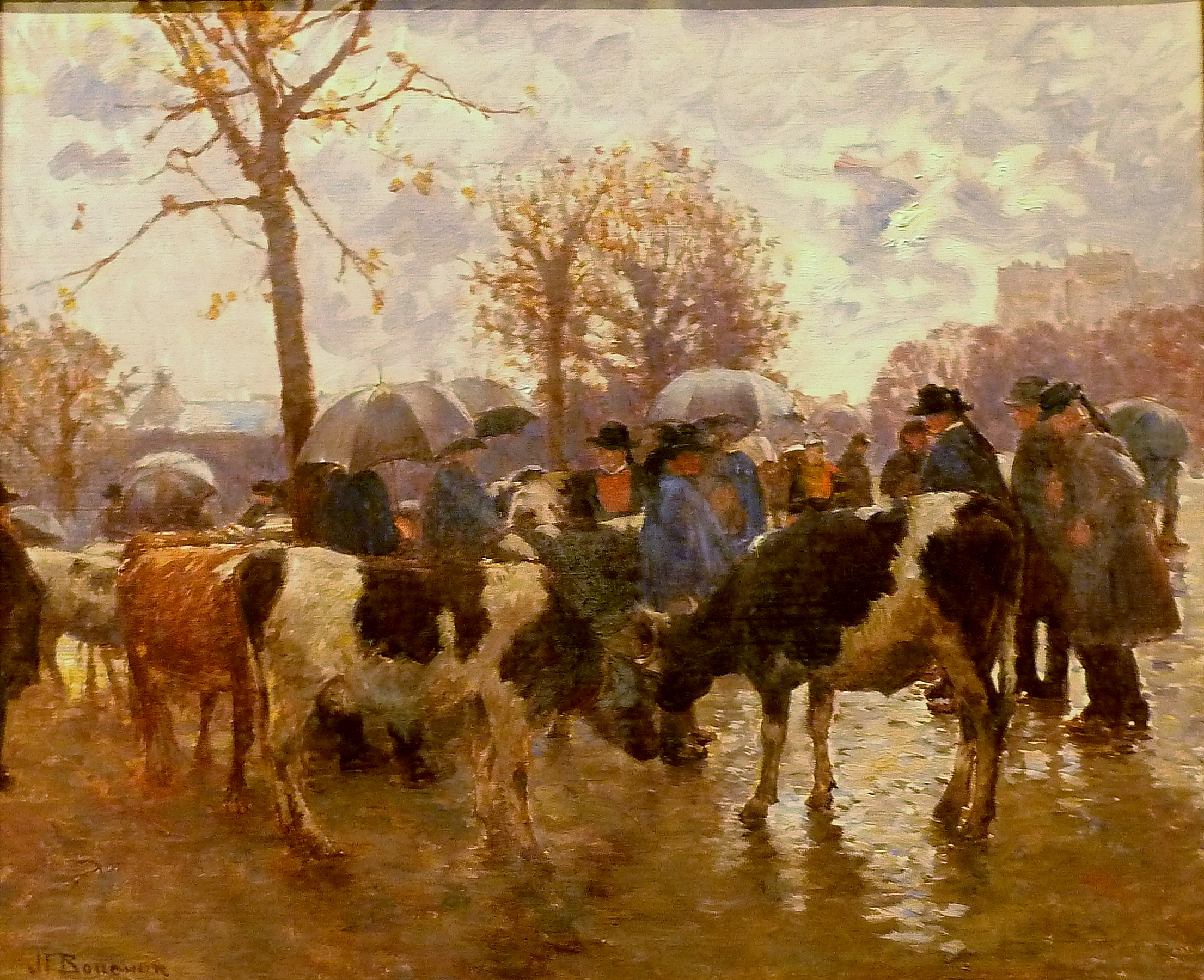
Marché aux Bestiaux Quimper (Musée des beaux-arts de Vannes)

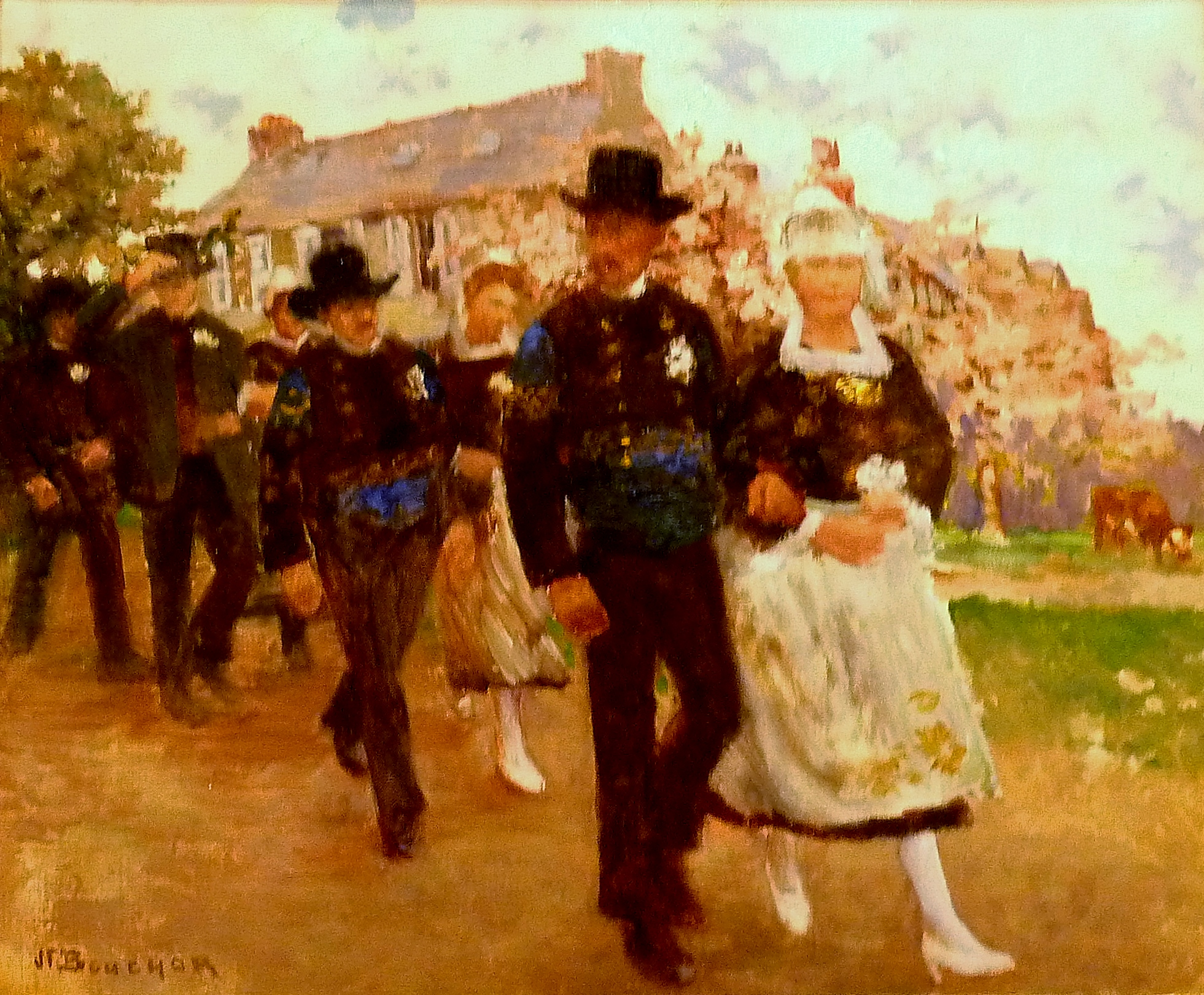
Noce Bretonne (Musée des Beaux-arts de Vannes)

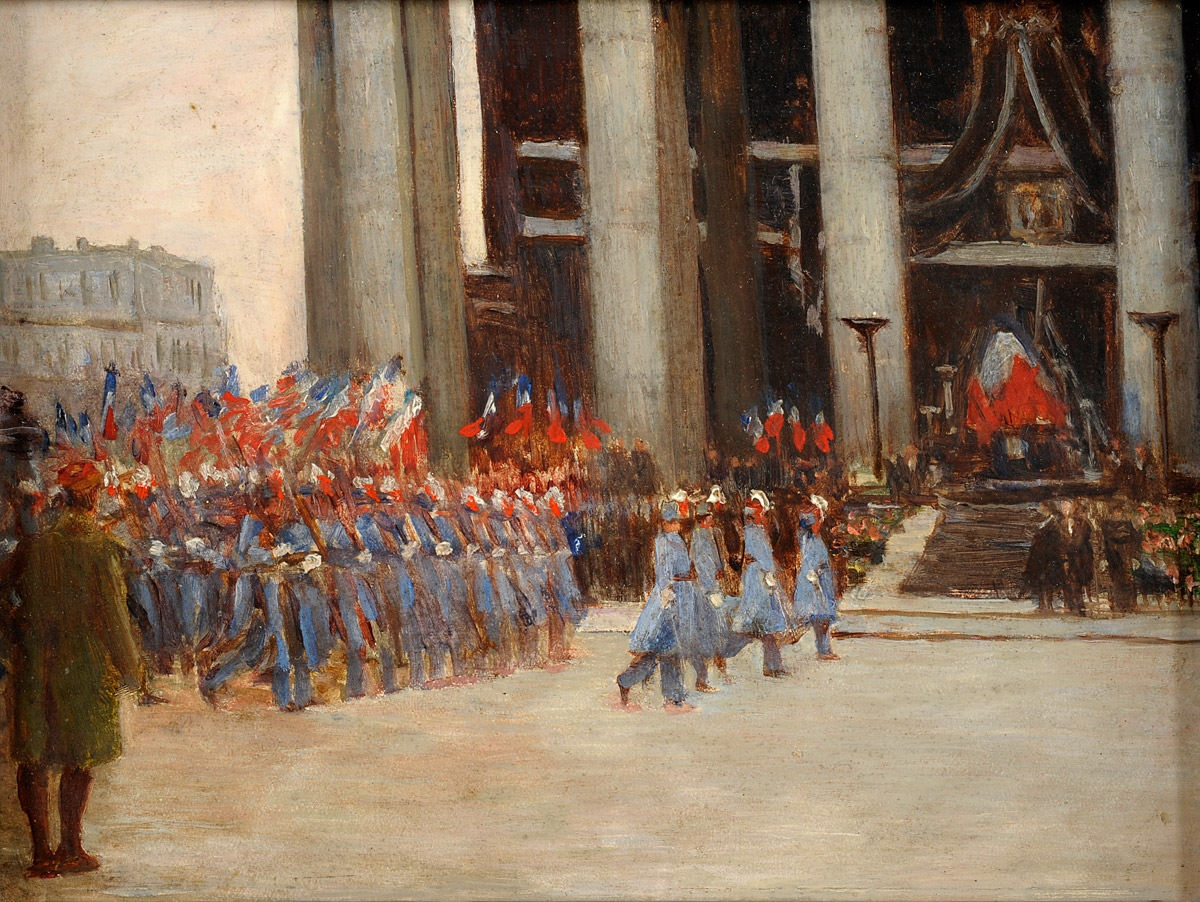
Parade Militaire à Paris

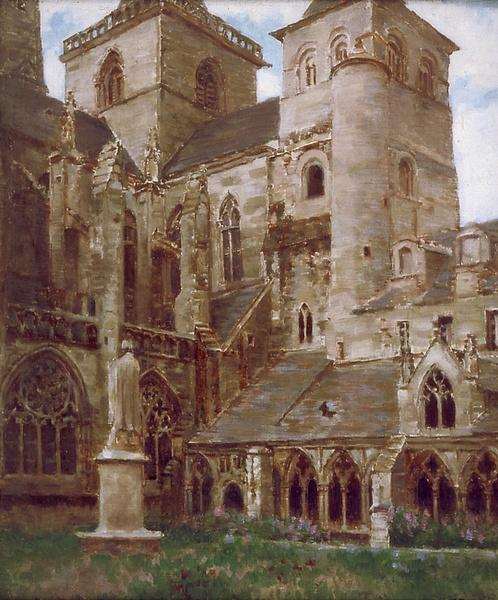
Le cloître de Tréguier, 1925

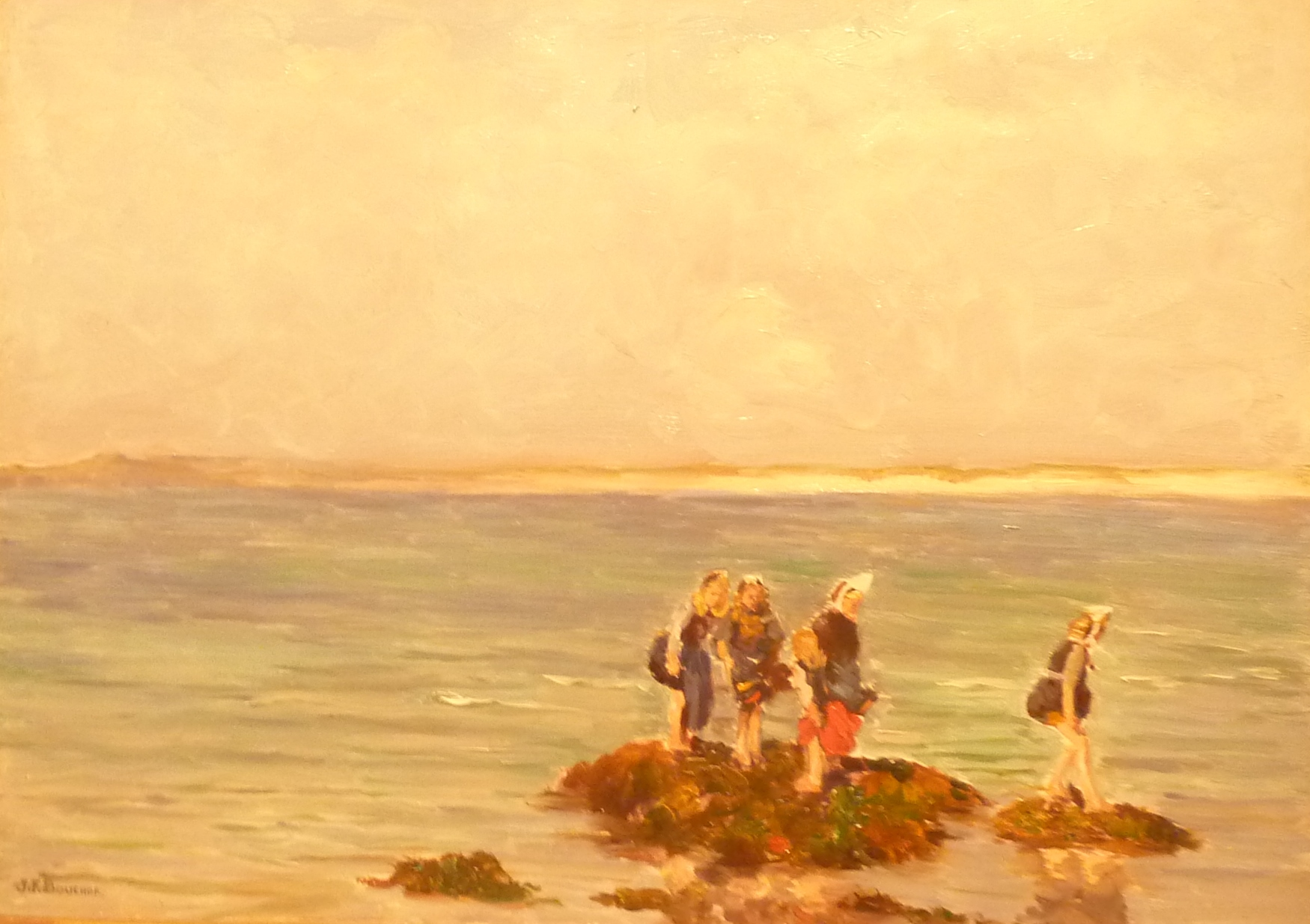
Les pataugeuses, Musée des Beaux-arts de Vannes)

== See also ==
- List of Orientalist artists
- Orientalism

== Sources and References ==
- Benezit Dictionary of Artists
- Franco-Americain Museum in Blérancourt, France
