= Stanisław Kubicki =

Polish painter (1889–1942)

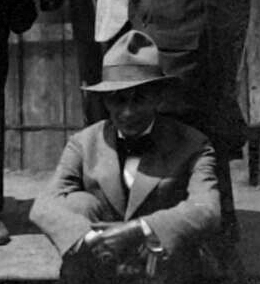
- Stanislav Kubicki at the International Congress of Progressive Artists 1922
- Born: Stanisław Kubicki; 7 November 1889; Zeigenhain, Germany
- Died: 1942 (aged 52–53); Warsaw, Poland occupied by Nazi Germany
- Education: Bauakademie, Humboldt University, Academy of Arts in Berlin (neither completed)
- Known for: Painting, printmaking, poetry
- Movement: Expressionism Constructivism
- Spouse: Margerete Schuster

Stanisław Kubicki (7 November 1889 – 1942) was a Polish painter, printmaker, member of the Expressionist movement in the arts and literature.

== Biography ==
Born as the second child of engineer Witalis and his wife, Maria Stark. In 1908, he began studying at the school of architecture in Bauakademie and at the Faculty of Philology at the Humboldt University of Berlin, as well as botanics and zoology. He completed neither course. He was part of the Society of Tomasz Zan and the "Grupa Narodowa" (National Group). He published his first works in the Berlin periodicals of "Die Aktion" and "Der Sturm". During this time, he married Margarete Schuster, she took her husband's surname and changed her first name to Małgorzata. In 1911, he renewed his studies at the Academy of Arts in Berlin, however, these were halted by the start of the First World War. He was drafted into the German Army and sent to the Eastern Front on the left bank of the Vistula River in the area of the town of Iłża (about 40 km south of Radom), where he was injured in June 1915. After recovering he was sent to the reserve battalion in Bolesławiec (German: Bunzlau).[1] In 1916–1917, he served in the border guard in Chełmsk Śląski (German: Schomberg).[2] In 1917, he was assigned to a quartermaster course in Poznań. He was then sent to Warsaw, where from June to September 1918 he held the position of quartermaster at the Belvedere Palace.

In 1918, he moved to Berlin, where, in 1922 he founded the "Progressive" group, displaying his artwork in Düsseldorf, Aachen, Amsterdam, Chicago and Moscow. In May 1922 he attended the International Congress of Progressive Artists and signed the "Founding Proclamation of the Union of Progressive International Artists".

Until 1933, he cooperated with the news journal "a-z". During these years, he moved away from Expressionism becoming more involved with Cubism and Constructivism in his artwork. In 1933, Stanisław also founded the anarchist art group "Die Kommune".

In 1933, he moved from Berlin to Poznań. Before World War II, he tried to move to the civil war torn Spain. He abandoned painting for literature and poetry. During World War II, he helped the Home Army, acting as herald for the embassy of Manchuria in Berlin. The circumstances of his death are unknown, but were likely at the hands of the Gestapo. Stanisław Kubicki's resting place remains unknown.

== Selected paintings ==
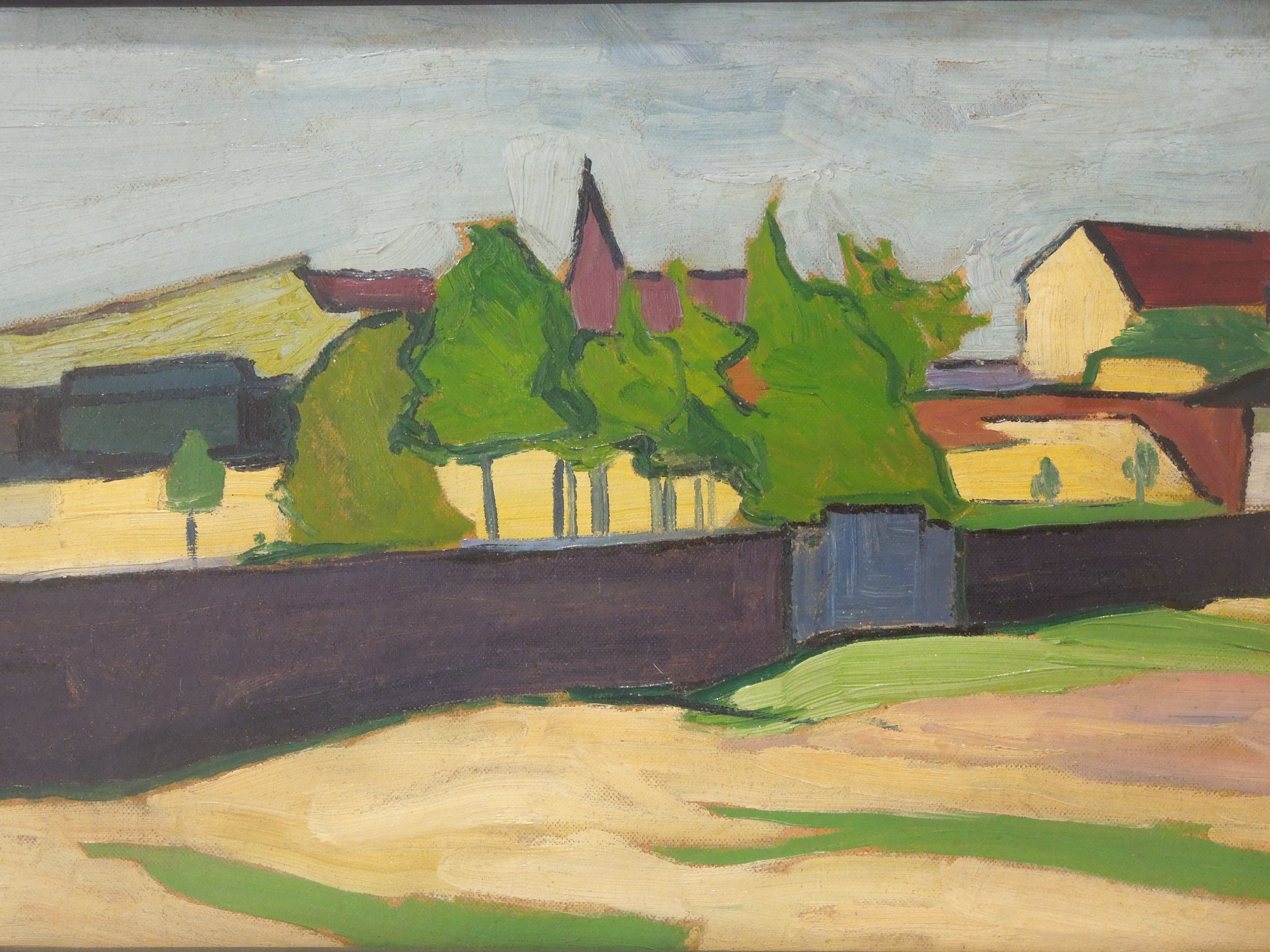
Little Town
(1913)

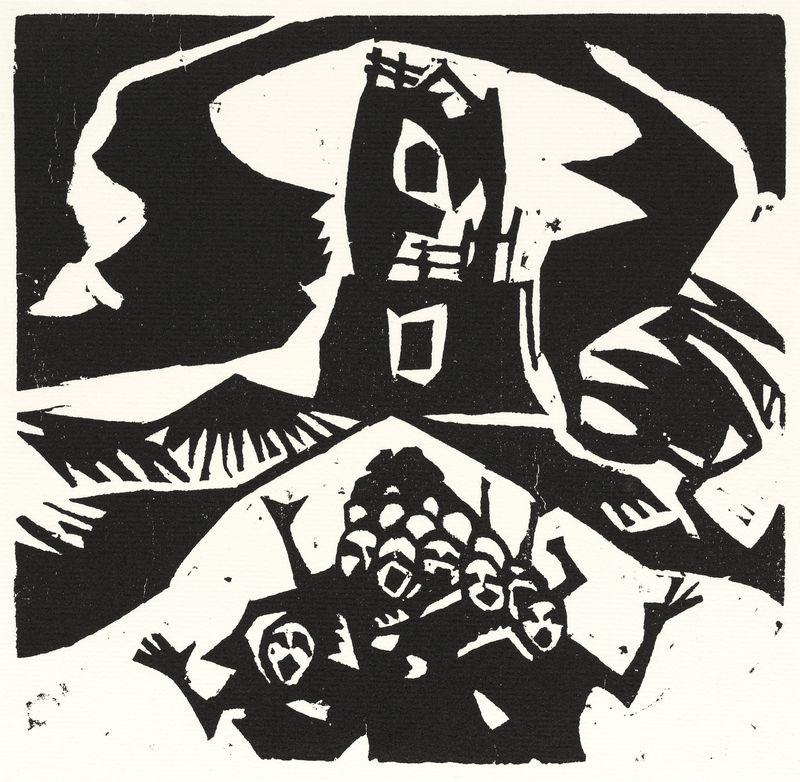
Tower of Babel II (version b)
(1918)

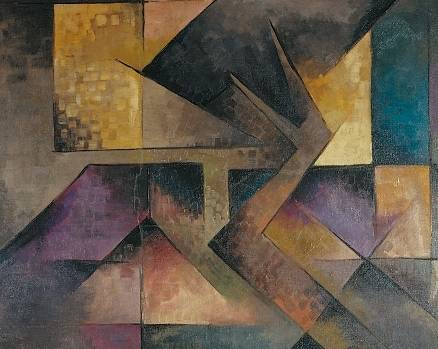
Autoportret VII
(1922)

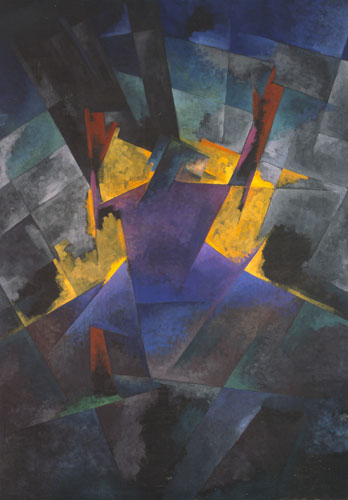
Moses and the Burning Bush
(1933)

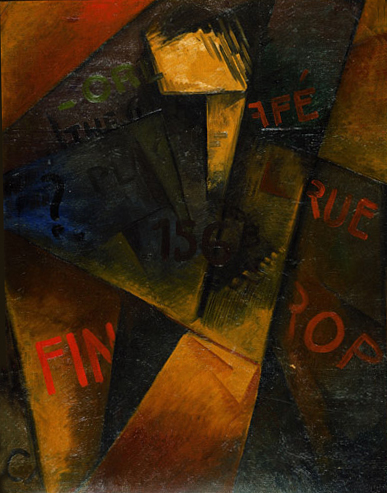
Incoming
(before 1939)
