= Han Ryner =

French individualist anarchist philosopher (1861–1938)

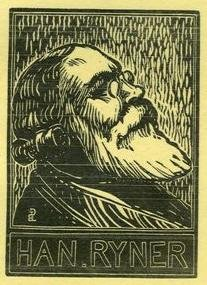
- Born: Jacques Élie Henri Ambroise Ner; 7 December 1861; Nemours, Department of Oran, French Algeria (modern-day Ghazaouet, Tlemcen Province, Algeria)
- Died: 6 February 1938 (aged 76); Paris, France

Philosophical work
- Era: 20th-century philosophy
- Region: Western philosophy
- School: Individualist anarchism
- Main interests: The individual, ethics, sex, Stoicism, Epicureanism

Jacques Élie Henri Ambroise Ner (7 December 1861 – 6 February 1938), commonly known by the pen name Han Ryner, was a French individualist anarchist philosopher and activist and a novelist. He wrote for publications such as L'Art social, L'Humanité nouvelle, L'Ennemi du Peuple, L'Idée Libre de Lorulot; and L'En dehors and L'Unique of fellow anarchist individualist Émile Armand. His thought is mainly influenced by Stoicism and Epicureanism.

== Biography ==
Henri Ner was born in Ghazaouet, in French Algeria, on 7 December 1861. After graduating from university, Ner began a career as a teacher, lecturing at secondary schools throughout Provence. He also became a Freemason, serving as Orator of the masonic lodge in Gap from 1884 to 1888. He later movied to Paris, where he taught at Lycée Charlemagne and Louis-le-Grand.

He became involved in socialist activism during the 1890s, publishing a manifesto in 1892 which called for bread to be brought under social ownership, and establishing a teachers' union in 1896. He adopted the pen name of Han Ryner in 1898, and began writing fiction. Over the course of his life, he wrote over 50 novels, plays and short stories, which gained a popular following in revolutionary circles. His first novel, Le Crime d’obéir (1900), was about a conscientious objector and expressed an individualist philosophy that opposed all forms of coercion. He also contributed thousands of articles to anarchist and pacifist publications. As editor-in-chief of the newspaper Demain, Ryner became involved in the Dreyfus Affair. In 1900, he contributed to anarchist publications edited by Augustin Hamon, Émile Janvion and Francis Jourdain, and the following year, wrote a series of literary criticisms.

From 1903 to 1907, Ryner lectured on individualist philosophy at the popular university in Saint-Antoine; and from 1905 to 1914, he contributed to various publications by Émile Armand. In 1913, he publicly defended Eugène Dieudonné, who had been implicated in the crimes of the Bonnot Gang. During this time, he was subjected to a conspiracy of silence in the mainstream literary press, who shunned him due to his harsh criticisms of high-profile literary figures such as Gabriele D'Annunzio, Friedrich Nietzsche and Émile Zola. This lasted until 1912, when a group of young literary scholars defended him in a public vote in L'Intransigeant. He was then finally able to publish a science fiction novel, Les Pacifiques (1914), which had been rejected by publishers over the previous decade. The book depicted a harmonious anarchist society, which had been brought about by a movement of nonviolent resistance. He was sometimes criticised by anarchists for his pacifist leanings.

During World War I, he maintained his pacifism and anti-militarism. He contributed articles to Armand's publications in 1915 and to those of Sébastien Faure in 1916 and 1917. He also promoted pacifism in the journals of Édouard Dujardin and Maurice Wullens. Ryner formed part of an inter-war pacifist camp, along with Romain Rolland, Jean Giono and Stefan Zweig. From 1920 to 1922, Ryner wrote a weekly column for Le Journal du peuple in which he defended conscientious objectors and political prisoners, and protested against political repression in Italy, Hungary and the Soviet Union. His activism contributed to the release of Armand from prison and raised awareness of Sacco and Vanzetti. During the 1920s, he contributed to Spanish and Latin American anarchist periodicals, as well as the French anarchist magazine Le Libertaire and Faure's Anarchist Encyclopedia. He also supported the establishment of naturist colonies and experiments in libertarian education.

He continued writing fiction later into his life, such as La Vie éternelle (1927) and LÉglise devant ses juges (1937), which respectively posited the existence of reincarnation and condemened the Christian clergy. He remained among the most respected figures of the French anarchist movement during the inter-war period. Ryner died in Paris, on 6 January 1938, and his body was buried in the Thiais Cemetery. His daughter Georgette established the Societ of Friends of Han Ryner, which perpetuated his memory for 40 years and published 180 issues of its official publication.

== Writings ==
Ryner's writing was influenced by the naturalist and symbolist movements. His utopian fiction satirised contemporary society and offered visions of anti-authoritarian communities. His philosophical works attempted to revive the traditions of ancient Greek philosophies, such as Pythagoreanism and Stoicism, which he proposed as models for an anarchist ethics. And his romantic works explore different kinds of relationships between people, including those of free love.

== Philosophy ==
Ryner had a staunch individualist philosophy and never referred to himself by any label, not even that of "anarchist". Ryner was critical of nationalism, clericalism and class stratification. He preferred non-violent methods of resistance and what he called an "inner revolution" undertaken by individuals, rather than violent direct action or social revolution. He was inspired by the works of Socrates and Jesus, and the ancient Greek philosophies of Cynicism, Epicureanism and Stoicism.

== Works ==
- Chair vaincue, roman psychologique (1889)
- Les Chants du divorce, poésies (1892)
- L'Humeur inquiète (1894)
- La Folie de misère (1895)
- Le Crime d'obéir (1900)
- Le Soupçon (1900)
- L'Homme fourmi, novel illustrated by Alexis Mérodack-Jeanneau (1901)
- Les Voyages de Psychodore, philosophe cynique (1903) (translated by Brian Stableford and included in The Superhumans, q.v.)
- Petit Manuel individualiste (1903)
- La Fille manquée (1903) Rééd. QuestionDeGenre/GKC (2013)
- Petit Manuel individualiste (1903)
- Prostitués, études critiques sur les gens de lettres d'aujourd'hui (1904)
- Les Chrétiens et les philosophes (1906)
- Le Subjectivisme. Des bons et mauvais usages de la logique. La Métaphysique et les Sagesses positives. Le Déterminisme et la Liberté. Les Morales: Servilisme et Dominisme. Les Sagesses: Fraternisme et Subjectivisme. Les Étapes de la sagesse (1909)
- Vive le roi, hypothèse en 3 actes. Les Esclaves, vision en un acte (1910)
- Le Cinquième Évangile (1911)
- Le Fils du silence (1911)
- Les Paraboles cyniques (1913)
- Les Apparitions d'Ahasvérus v. 1913)
- Les Pacifiques (1914)
- Le Père Diogène (v. 1915–1935)
- Le Sphinx rouge (1918)
- Le Poison, drame en 1 acte (1919)
- La Tour des peuples (1919)
- Le Père Diogène (1920). Réédition: Premières Pierres, 2007.
- Dialogue du mariage philosophique; suivi des Dicéphales (1922)
- Les Véritables entretiens de Socrate (1922)
- L'Individualisme dans l'antiquité (histoire et critique) (1924)
- Le Communisme et la Liberté (1924)
- Le Crime d'obéir, roman d'histoire contemporaine (1925)
- Jusqu'à l'âme: drame moderne en 2 actes (1925)
- L'Ingénieux Hidalgo Miguel Cervantès (1926)
- La Vie éternelle, roman du mystère (1926)
- Jésus est-il un personnage historique ou un personnage légendaire ? La Vérité sur Jésus (1926)
- L'Aventurier d'amour (1927)
- L'Amour plural, roman d'aujourd'hui et de demain (1927)
- Jeanne d'Arc fut-elle victime de l'Église ? (1927)
- La Sagesse qui rit (1928)
- Les Surhommes, roman prophétique (1929) (translated by Brian Stableford as The Superhumans, ISBN 978-1-935558-77-4)
- Songes perdus (1929)
- Chère Pucelle de France (1930)
- Prenez-moi tous ! (1930)
- Crépuscules. Bouddha. Platon. Épicure. Thraséas. Raymond Lulle. Rabelais. Leibniz. Hegel. Vigny. Élisée Reclus, etc. (1930)
- Le Manœuvre: pièce en 3 actes (1931)
- Dans le mortier. Zénon. Phocion, Saint Ignace; Les Albigeois; Michel Servet; Pierre Ramus; Vanini; Brousson; Francisco Ferrer (1932)
- La Soutane et le veston, roman (1932)
- Bouche d'or, patron des pacifistes (1934)
- La Cruauté de l'Église (1937)
- L'Église devant ses juges (1937)
- Le Massacre des amazones: études critiques sur deux cents bas-bleus contemporains: Mmes Adam, Sarah Bernhardt, Marie-Anne de Bovet, Bradamante, Jeanne Chauvin, Alphonse Daudet (s. d.)
- La Beauté: légende dramatique en quatre tableaux (1938)
- Florilège de paraboles et de songes (1942)
- Face au public. Première série, 1901–1919 (1948)
- J'ai mon Éliacin, souvenirs d'enfance (1956)
- Aux orties, souvenirs d'adolescence (1957)
- Le Sillage parfumé (1958)
- Les Grandes Fleurs du désert (1963)

== See also ==
- Individualist anarchism in Europe
- List of peace activists

== Bibliography ==
- Frigerio, Vittorio (2011). "Ryner, Han (1861–1938)". In Ness, Immanuel (ed.). The International Encyclopedia of Revolution and Protest. doi:10.1002/9781405198073.wbierp1799.
- Lecha, Gérard (1993). Han Ryner or the Social Thinking of an Individualist in the Early Part of the 20th Century (PhD thesis) (in French). University of Tours. Archived from the original on 15 February 2012.
- Maitron, Jean; Arnoult, Clément; Bedos, Pascal (7 October 2024) [2014-03-30]. "HAN RYNER [NER Jacques, Henri, Élie, Ambroise, Mathieu, Ernest, dit]". Dictionnaire des anarchistes (in French).
