= Oigny-en-Valois =

- Commune
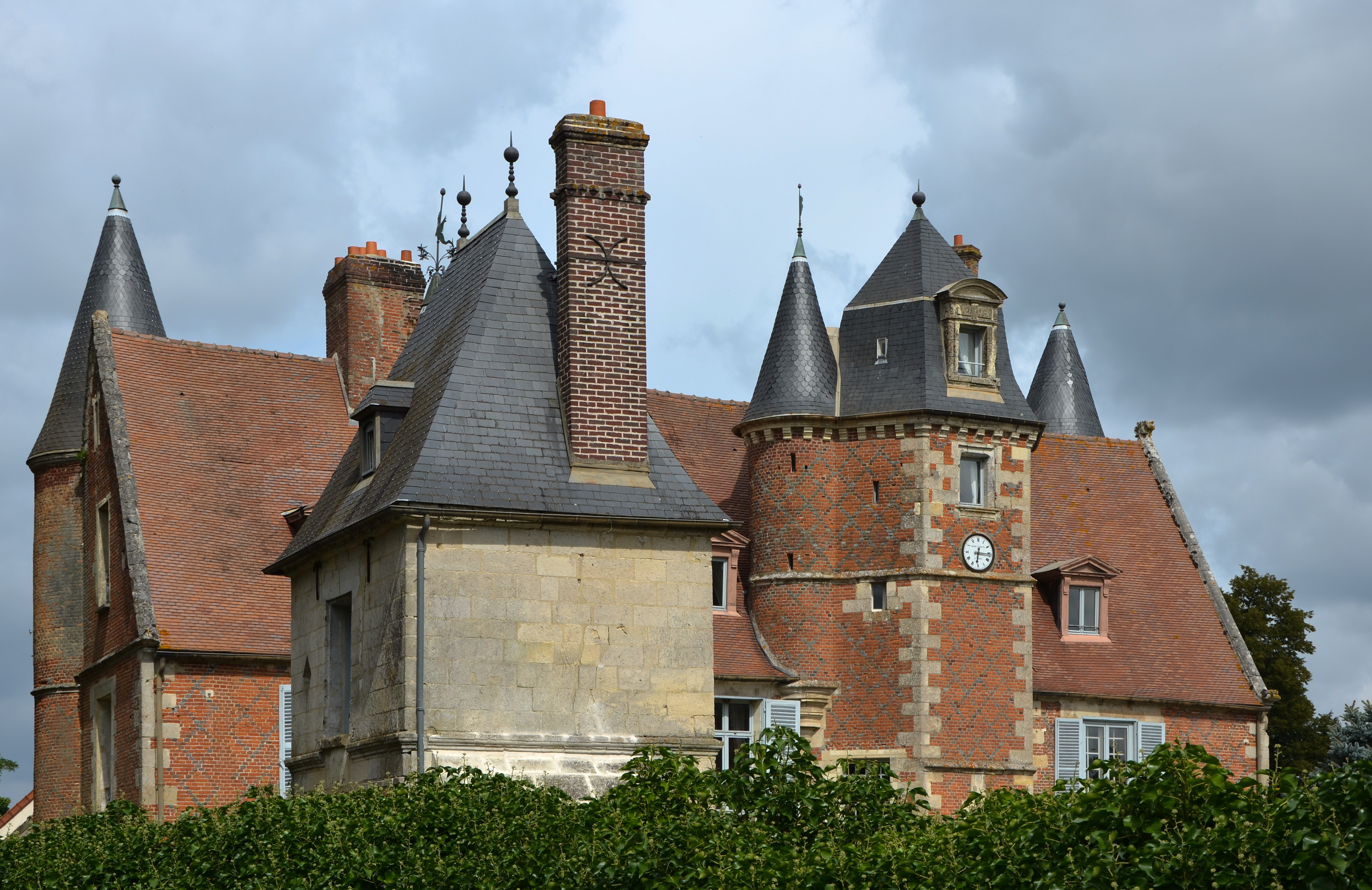
- Chateau

- Coat of arms
- Location of Oigny-en-Valois
- Location within France Location within Hauts-de-France
- Coordinates: 49°13′12″N 3°08′15″E
- Country: France
- Region: Hauts-de-France
- Department: Aisne
- Arrondissement: Soissons
- Canton: Villers-Cotterêts

Government
  - Mayor (2026–32): Christine Olry
- Area^{1}: 11.88 km^{2} (4.59 sq mi)
- Elevation: 156 m (512 ft)
- Highest elevation: 158 m (518 ft)
- Lowest elevation: 72 m (236 ft)
- Population (2023): 176
  - Density: 14.8/km^{2} (38.4/sq mi)
- Time zone: UTC+01:00 (CET)
  - Summer (DST): UTC+02:00 (CEST)
- INSEE/Postal code: 02568 /02600
- ^{1} French Land Register data, which excludes lakes, ponds, glaciers > 1 km^{2} (0.386 sq mi or 247 acres) and river estuaries.

Oigny-en-Valois (French pronunciation: [waɲi ɑ̃ valwa], lit. 'Oigny in Valois') is a commune in the Aisne department in Hauts-de-France in northern France.

== Population ==
Historical population
Year	Pop.	±% p.a.
1968	92	—
1975	116	+3.37%
1982	137	+2.41%
1990	188	+4.04%
1999	163	−1.57%
2007	159	−0.31%
2012	141	−2.37%
2017	155	+1.91%
2023	176	+2.14%
Source: INSEE

== See also ==
- Communes of the Aisne department
- Château d'Oigny-en-Valois
