= Protestant Church of Reims =

- Temple protestant de Reims
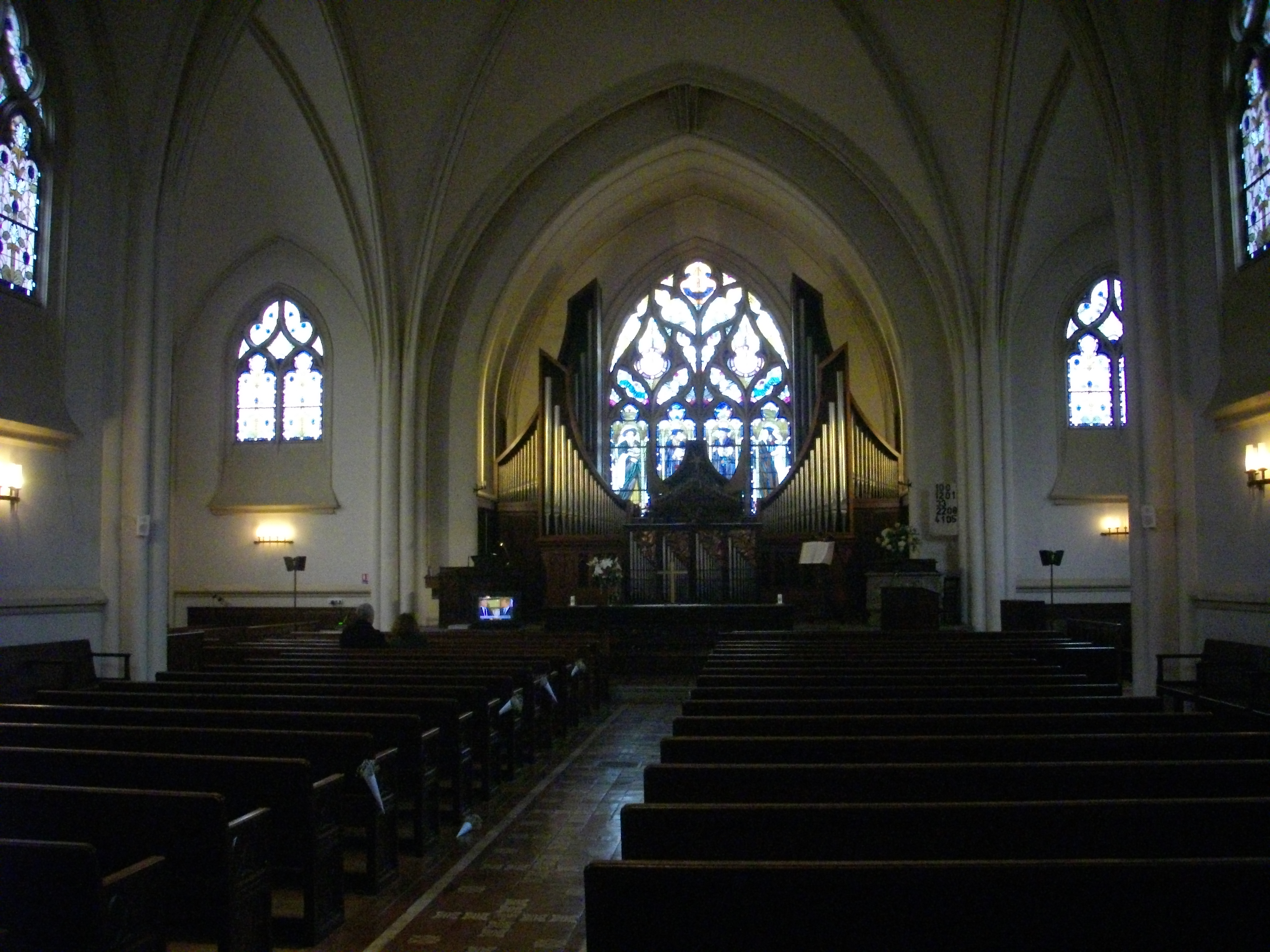
- Interior

- Location within France
- 49.258421°N 4.037379°E
- Location: 13 boulevard Lundy, Reims
- Country: France
- Denomination: United Protestant Church of France
- Website: www.epu-reimsepernay.org/index.html

History
- Founded: 1921–23

The Protestant Church of Reims (French: Temple protestant de Reims) is a large Protestant church in Reims, France, built in 1921–1923 to replace an earlier building that had been destroyed during World War I (1914–1918). The building is in flamboyant Neo-Gothic style. Originally the interior was decorated with Art Deco frescoes, but these deteriorated and have been painted over.

== History ==
The Reformed Church of Reims was established by royal decree on 30 April 1832. On 15 December 1867 the Reformed Temple was opened on the Boulevard Lundy in a converted building that had formerly been a riding school. During World War I (1914–18) the temple was destroyed by incendiary shells. After the war it was rebuilt in the same location. The foundation stone was laid on 23 October 1921. The temple was dedicated on 24 June 1923 by Pastor Louis Gonin, president of the Presbyteral council of Reims. The interior walls were originally covered with Art Deco frescoes by Gustave Louis Jaulmes, representing subjects such as the Tree of Life, Tables of the Law and Huguenot Cross with tears, with many plant decorations.

The pulpit, in Gothic Revival style, was dismantled in 1972. In 1973 the frescoes were covered with white paint due to their deteriorated condition. This gives the temple a sober or austere interior, more in line with the Reformed Church tradition. A great organ was built between 1972 and 1976, with 53 registers. Construction was overseen by pastor Pierre Vallotton, who was passionate about organ music and the construction of instruments. The organ was inaugurated on 17 October 1976 by Arsène Muzerelle, organist of Reims Cathedral. .

== Building ==
The building was designed by Charles Letrosne (1868–1938) in a flamboyant neo-Gothic style influenced by Eugène Viollet-le-Duc. It was modeled on the Temple de l'Étoile in Paris. The layout is that of Latin cross, which is unusual in a church built for Protestants. The nave is built in concrete on foundation piles 10 metres (33 ft) deep. The nave is 33 metres (108 ft) long, and the transept is 20 metres (66 ft) long. The vaulted ceiling rises to 15 metres (49 ft). The windows represent biblical themes.

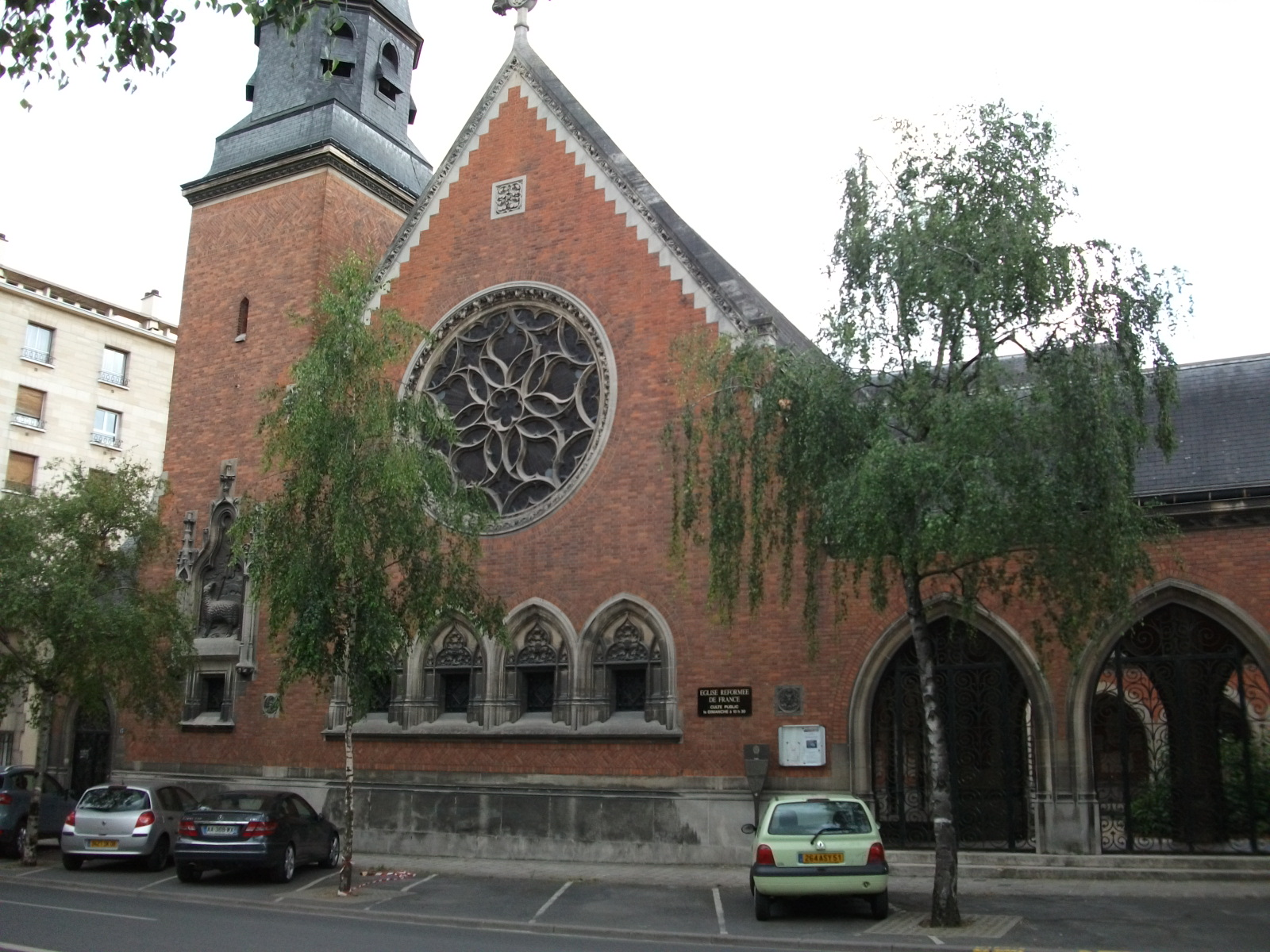
Facade

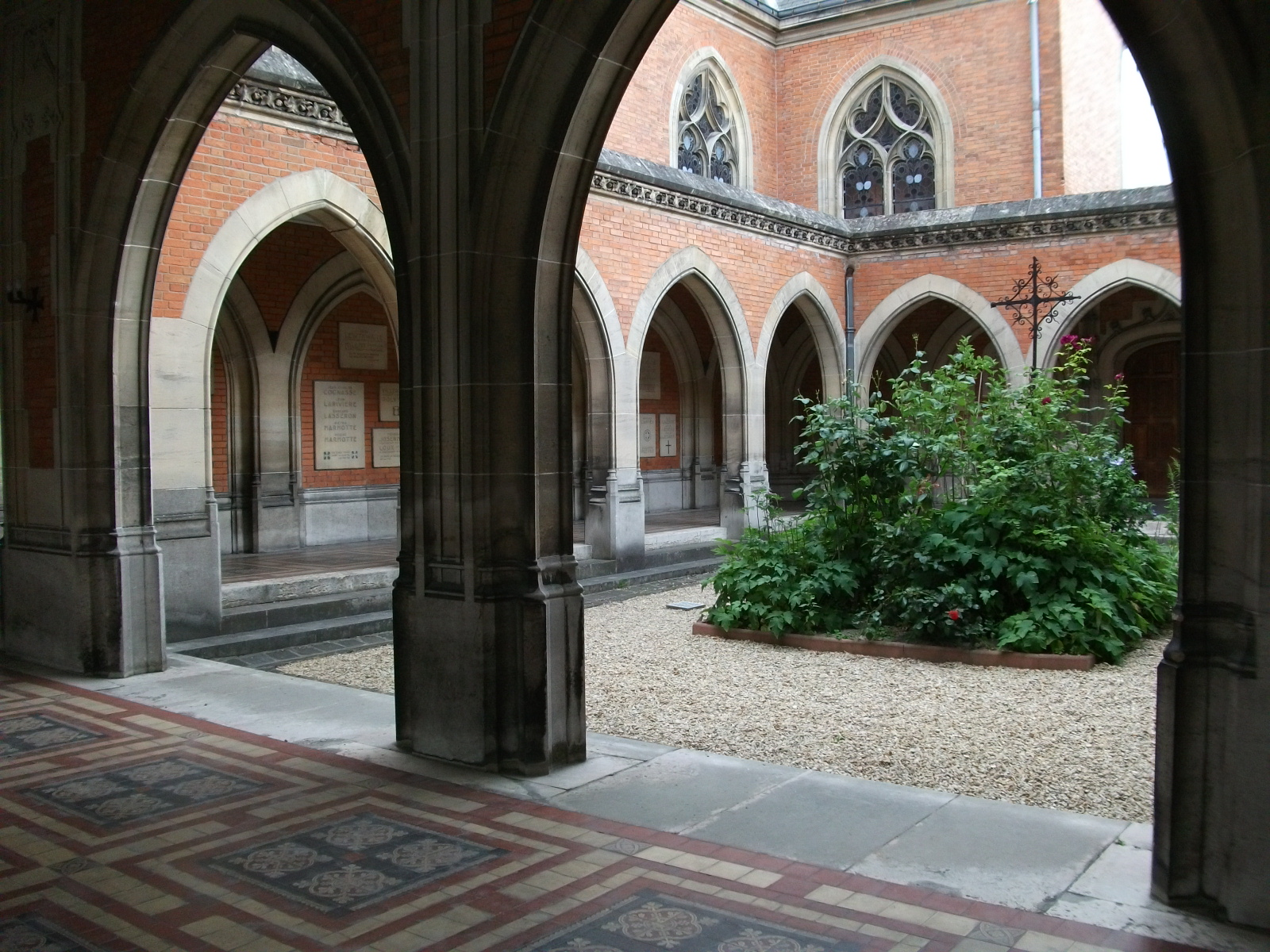
Patio

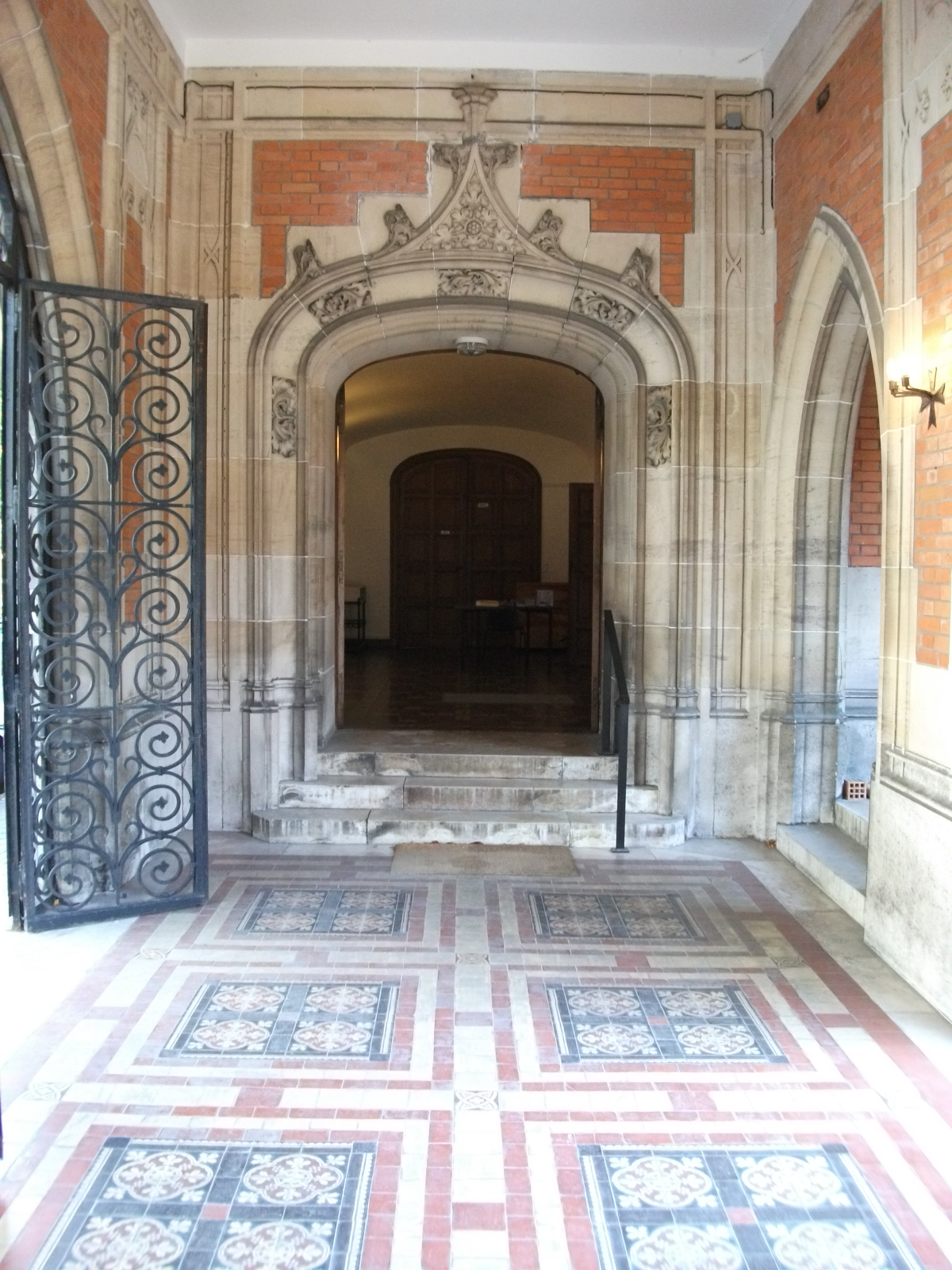
Entrance

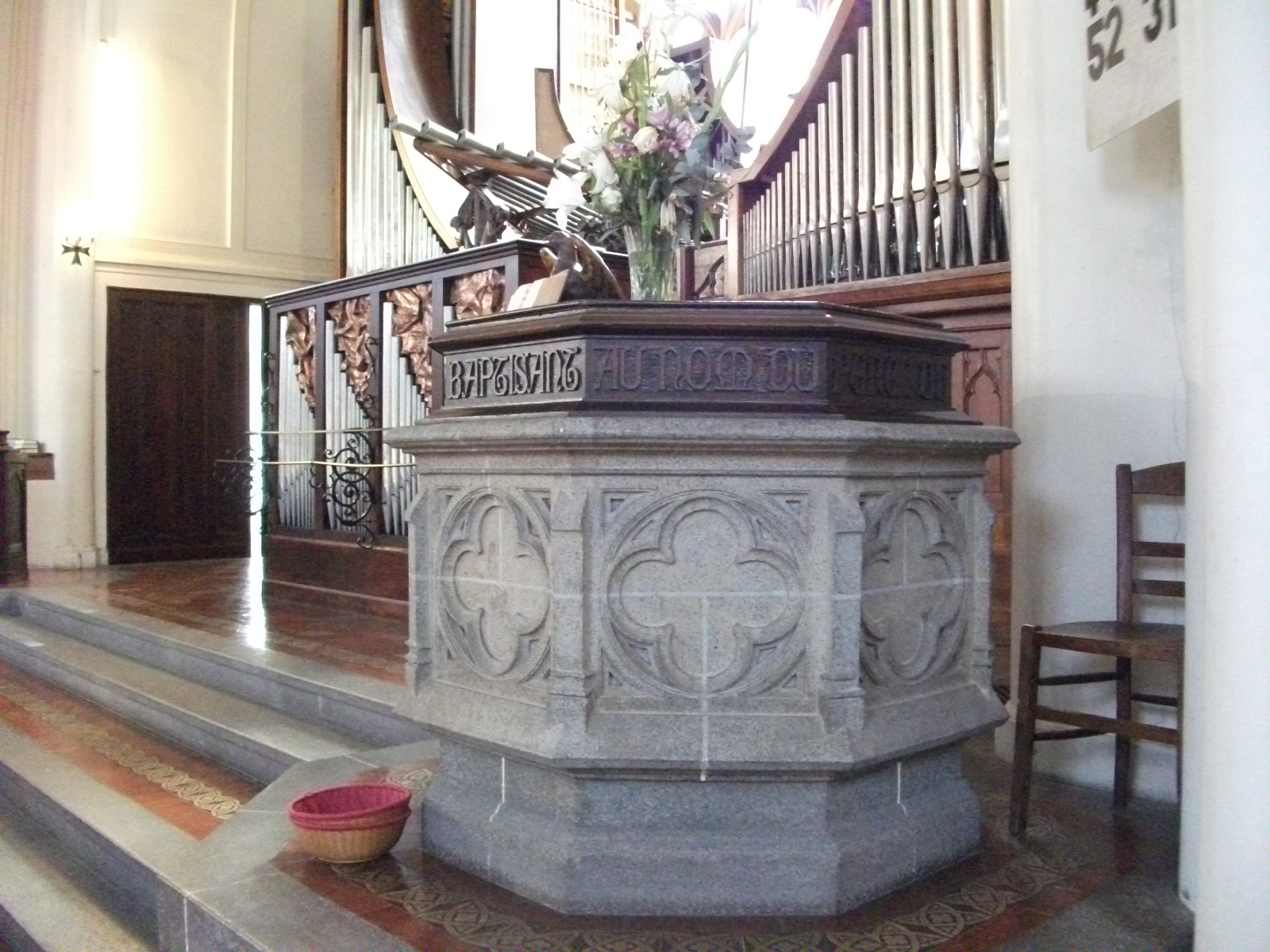
Baptistry

== Sources ==
- Bricout, Didier (2015). "Reims : le temple protestant".
- Champenois, Jean-Pierre; Bricout, Didier; Popp, Rudi (2015). "Reims : historique des temples" (in French).
- Guttinger, Philippe (2015). "Le temple protestant de Reims".
- Herr, Georges (2013-09-02). "L'orgue de l'Eglise Réformée de Reims". Eglise protestante unie de Reims-Epernay.
