= Chiry-Ourscamp =

- Commune
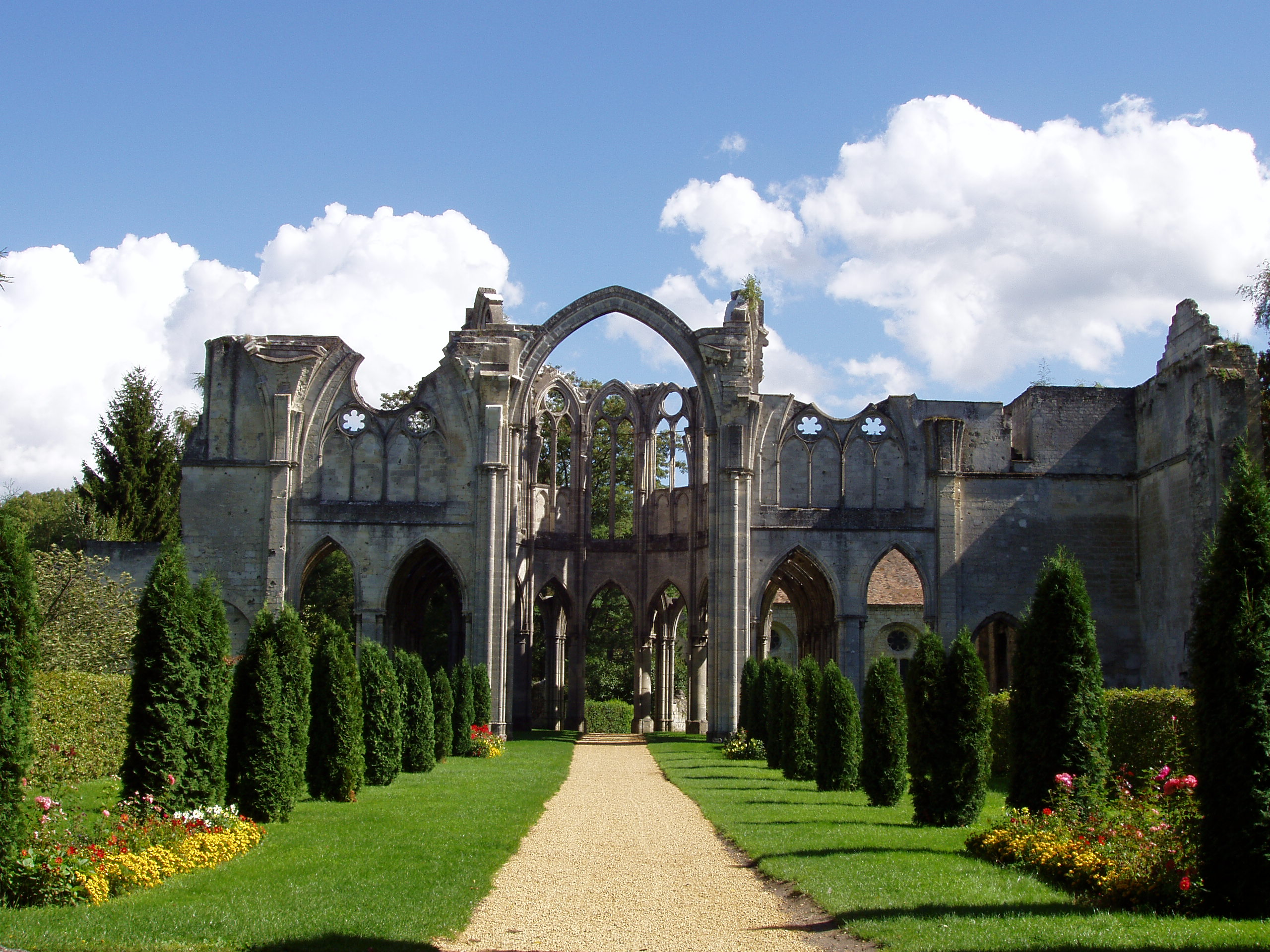
- Abbey of Notre-Dame d'Ourscamp

- Coat of arms
- Location of Chiry-Ourscamp
- Location within France Location within Hauts-de-France
- Coordinates: 49°32′47″N 2°57′07″E
- Country: France
- Region: Hauts-de-France
- Department: Oise
- Arrondissement: Compiègne
- Canton: Thourotte
- Intercommunality: Deux Vallées

Government
  - Mayor (2020–2026): Jean-Yves Bonnard
- Area^{1}: 13.25 km^{2} (5.12 sq mi)
- Highest elevation: 150 m (490 ft)
- Lowest elevation: 33 m (108 ft)
- Population (2023): 1,093
  - Density: 82.49/km^{2} (213.6/sq mi)
- Time zone: UTC+01:00 (CET)
  - Summer (DST): UTC+02:00 (CEST)
- INSEE/Postal code: 60150 /60138
- ^{1} French Land Register data, which excludes lakes, ponds, glaciers > 1 km^{2} (0.386 sq mi or 247 acres) and river estuaries.

Chiry-Ourscamp (French pronunciation: [ʃiʁi uʁskɑ̃], before 1999: Chiry-Ourscamps) is a French commune in the Oise department, region of Hauts-de-France.

== History ==
An early reference to the community dates to the seventh century, when it was referred to as Ursi campus. Château Mennechet, a castle constructed in the late 19th century in Chiry-Ourscamp lies in ruins after being left vacant following the Second World War.

== See also ==
- Communes of the Oise department
