= Jardins du Nouveau Monde =

Botanical gardens in France

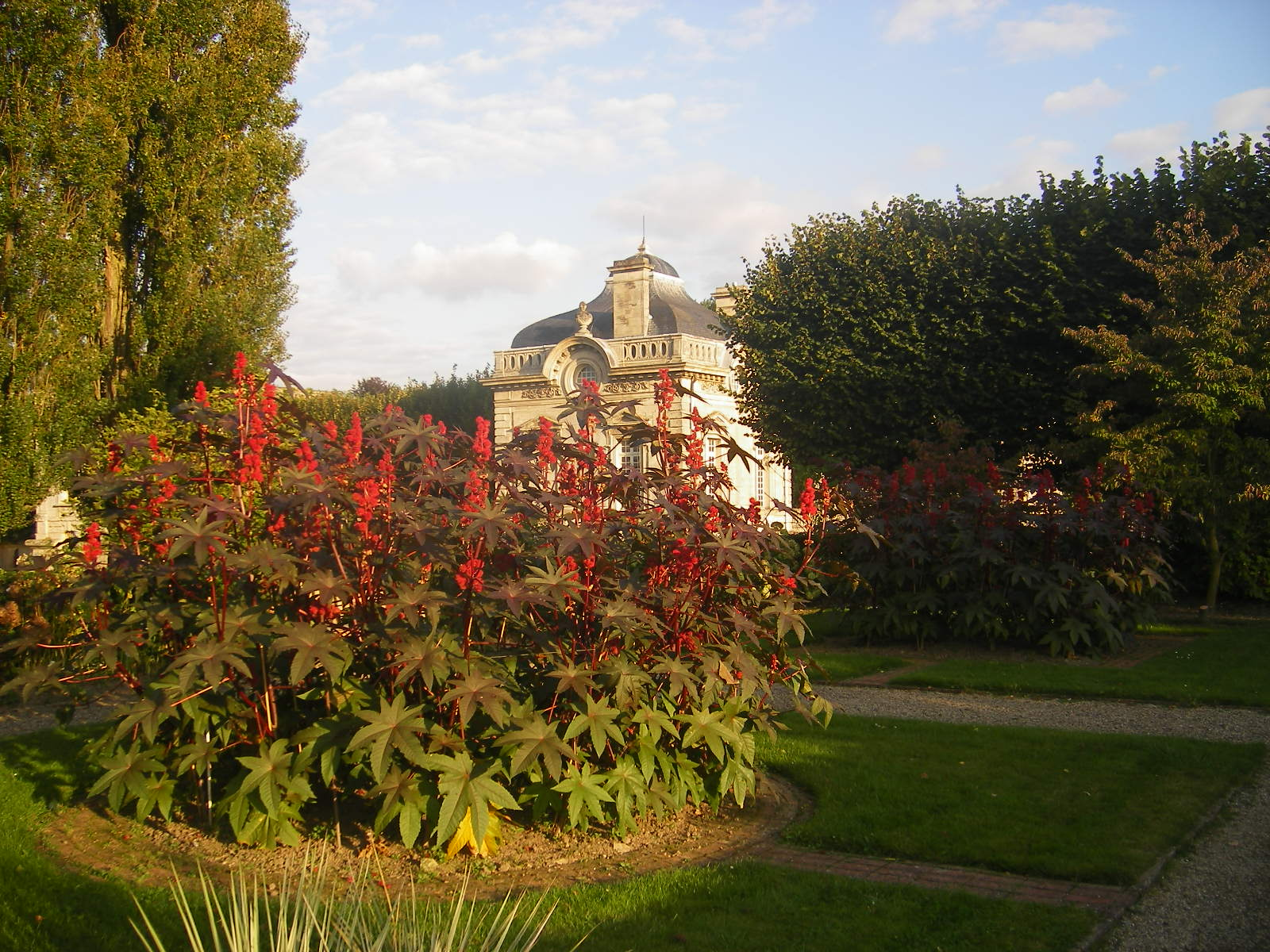
- Jardins du Nouveau Monde, Château de Blérancourt
- Type: Botanical garden, Arboretum
- Location: Blérancourt, Aisne, France
- Coordinates: 49.699°N 3.097°E
- Area: 1 hectare
- Created: 1986–1997
- Designer: Michel Boulcourt, Madison Cox, Mark Rudkin
- Owned by: Musée national de la Coopération Franco-américaine

The Jardins du Nouveau Monde (Gardens of the New World, 1 hectare) are gardens and a small arboretum containing plants from the Western Hemisphere located on the grounds of the Château de Blérancourt, now the Musée national de la Coopération Franco-américaine, in Blérancourt, Aisne, France.

The gardens were established on the site of the castle's previous kitchen garden by the American Friends of Blérancourt, with the arboretum funded by donations of the Colonial Dames of America – Chapter IV (Paris). Michel Boulcourt, Madison Cox, and Mark Rudkin served as garden designers. The gardens comprise four major areas:

- Le jardin de printemps (Spring Garden) - columbine, iris, jasmine, peony, poppy, and wisteria; designed by Mark Rudkin in 1997.
- Le jardin d'été (Summer Garden) - Virginia tulip trees with flowers of the new world including ornamental tobacco and American lily in parterres; designed by Madison Cox in 1989.
- Le jardin d'automne (Autumn Garden) - asters, cosmos, dahlias, heliotropes, and sunflowers; designed by Mark Rudkin and Michel Boulcourt in 1989.
- Arboretum - liquidambar, maple, oak, sequoia, etc.; designed by Mark Rudkin and Michel Boulcourt in 1986.

== See also ==
- List of botanical gardens in France
