= Château d'Oigny-en-Valois =

Coordinates: 49°13′10″N 3°08′16″E

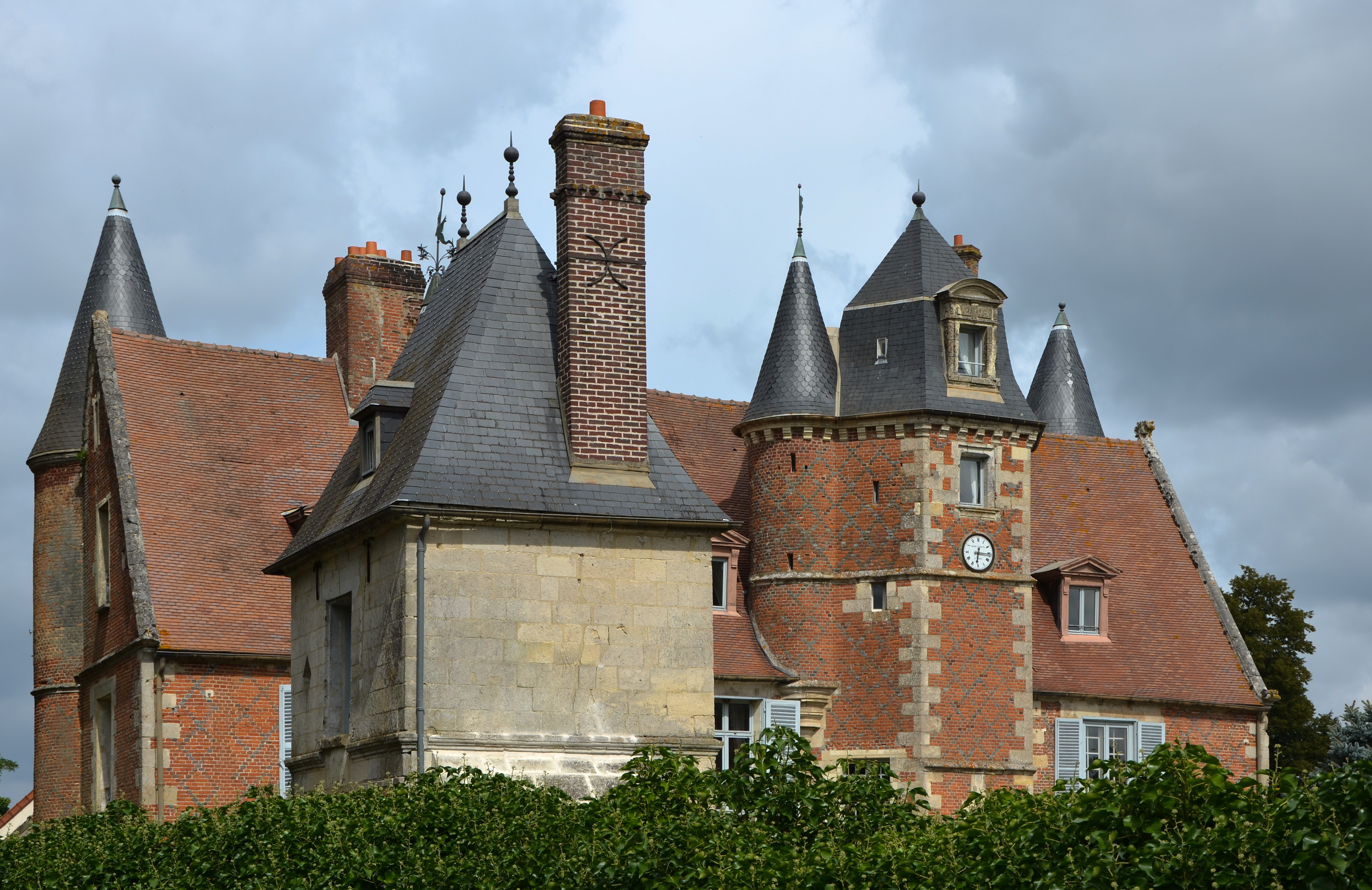
Castle of Oigny-en-Valois, Aisne, Picardie, France

The Château d'Oigny is a manor-house in the region of Villers-Cotterêts, which was built in the style of Louis XII between 1498 and 1515.

It is located in Oigny-en-Valois, Aisne and bought by American investor Matthew Le Merle in 2001.
