= Maurice Wullens =

French writer and anarcho-syndicalist

Mauritius Wullens (29 January 1894, Esquelbecq – February 1945, Socx) was a French writer and anarcho-syndicalist. He was a co-founder and director of Les humbles 1916-1940).

Maurice was born into a family of Flemish peasants. Five out of eight children died in infancy. His mother died when he was nine, and left him responsible for caring for his brother and sister. However he inherited his mother's love of reading, and with the support of his father and his primary school teacher at Bergues he passed the Brevet élémentaire in 1910. He went on to attend the Normal School for teachers at Douai.

Wullens joined the Confédération générale du travail (CGT) and was amongst the radicals who formed the breakaway Confédération générale du travail unitaire in 1921. He moved to Treton that year and founded the local section of the Communist Party of France of which he became the secretary.

In May 1922 he attended the International Congress of Progressive Artists and signed the "Founding Proclamation of the Union of Progressive International Artists".

In 1925 he visited the Soviet Union, and in 1927 published Paris, Moscou, Tiflis, an account of his trip.

He died of a heart attack in hospital at Socx in February 1945.

== Published works ==
- 1927 Paris, Moscou, Tiflis, Paris: Les Humbles
