= Château Mennechet =

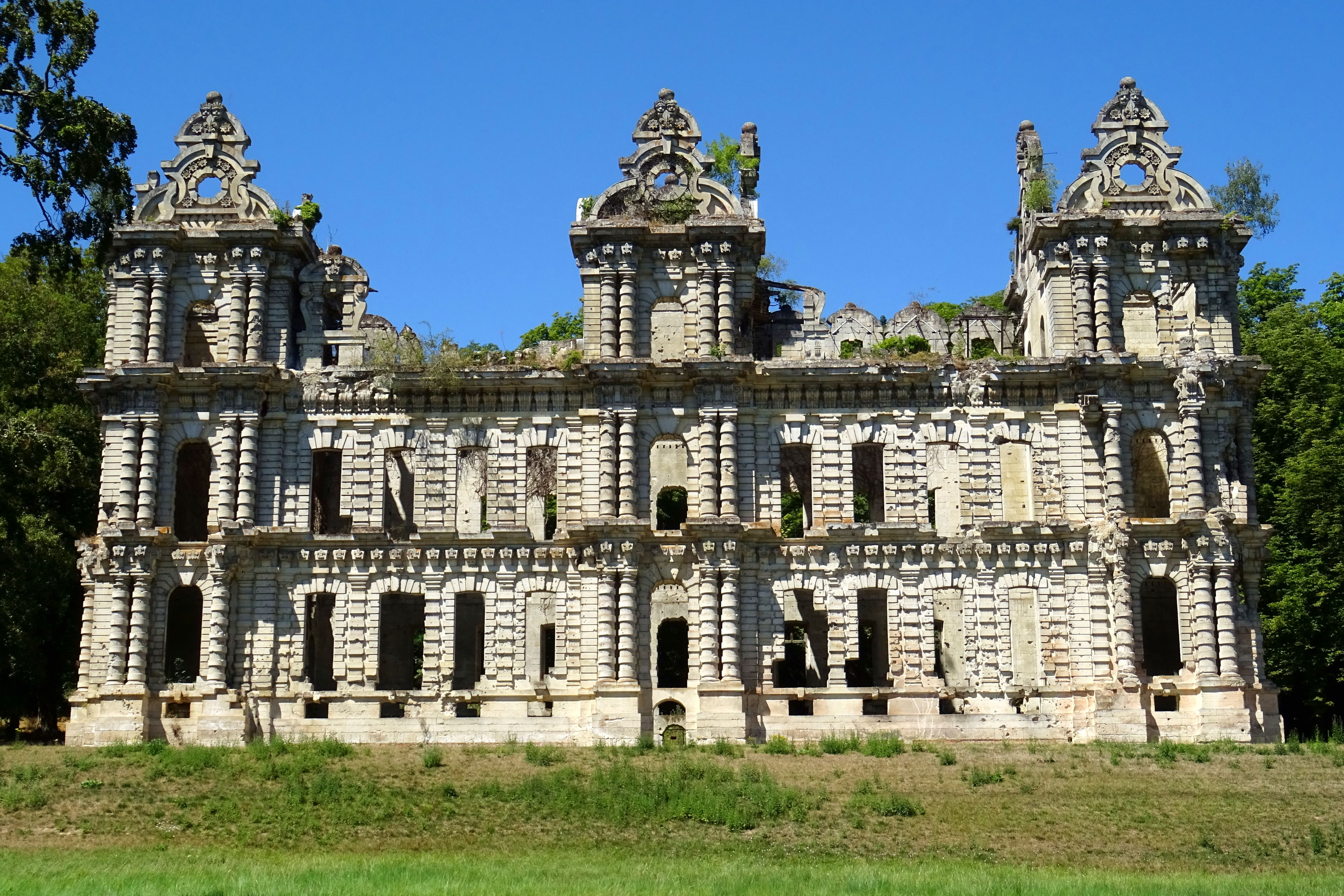
- The facade today
- Interactive map of the Château Mennechet area

General information
- Type: Château
- Location: Chiry-Ourscamp, France
- Coordinates: 49.5462°N 2.9459°E
- Completed: 19th century

The Château Mennechet is an historic château in Chiry-Ourscamp, Oise, Hauts-de-France, France. It was completed in the second half of the 19th century for Alphonse Mennechet de Barival. The château was left vacant shortly after World War II. The ruins and some outbuildings have been listed as an official historical monument since 2011.
