= Boulogne-la-Grasse =

- Commune
- Coat of arms
- Location of Boulogne-la-Grasse
- Location within France Location within Hauts-de-France
- Coordinates: 49°36′43″N 2°42′20″E
- Country: France
- Region: Hauts-de-France
- Department: Oise
- Arrondissement: Compiègne
- Canton: Estrées-Saint-Denis
- Intercommunality: Pays des Sources

Government
  - Mayor (2024–2026): Stéphanie Fanton
- Area^{1}: 9.41 km^{2} (3.63 sq mi)
- Elevation: 130 m (430 ft)
- Highest elevation: 153 m (502 ft)
- Lowest elevation: 77 m (253 ft)
- Population (2023): 472
  - Density: 50.2/km^{2} (130/sq mi)
- Time zone: UTC+01:00 (CET)
  - Summer (DST): UTC+02:00 (CEST)
- INSEE/Postal code: 60093 /60490
- ^{1} French Land Register data, which excludes lakes, ponds, glaciers > 1 km^{2} (0.386 sq mi or 247 acres) and river estuaries.

Boulogne-la-Grasse (French pronunciation: [bulɔɲ la ɡʁas]) is a commune in the Oise department in northern France.

== Population ==
Historical population
Year	Pop.	±% p.a.
1968	129	—
1975	168	+3.85%
1982	169	+0.08%
1990	222	+3.47%
1999	225	+0.15%
2007	424	+8.24%
2012	468	+1.99%
2017	471	+0.13%
2023	472	+0.04%
Source: INSEE

== See also ==
- Communes of the Oise department
