= Henry Poulaille =

French writer (1896–1980)

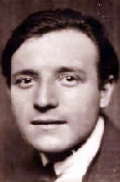
- Born: 5 December 1896; 11th arrondissement of Paris, Paris
- Died: 30 March 1980 (aged 83); 14th arrondissement of Paris, Paris
- Occupations: Writer, journalist, printer
- Writing career
- Genre: Proletarian literature

Henry Poulaille (5 December 1896 – 30 March 1980) was a French writer and a pioneer of proletarian literature.

== Biography ==
=== Early life and World War I ===
He was the son of Henri, an anarchist carpenter from Nantes, and Hortense Roulot, a chair-maker from Ménilmontant. However he was orphaned at the age of 14. He was self taught and developed a passion for books then he started to frequent libertarian circles. He thus met Jean Grave, Paul Delesalle, Victor Serge. He was part of the Anti-Stalinist left. During World War I, he was drafted within the 5th Battalion of Foot Soldiers, and was sent on the frontline on 12 August 1916. He is wounded at Chemin des Dames by a shrapnel on 23 October 1917. He will recount his war experience in Pain de soldat (Soldier's Bread).

=== Author ===
In May 1922, he attended the International Congress of Progressive Artists and signed the "Founding Proclamation of the Union of Progressive International Artists".

He was hired in 1923 by Editions Grasset, as director of the press service. Until his retirement in 1956, he was acting as literary advisor.

However he led his fight for proletarian literature with a manifesto book (Nouvel âge littéraire, New Literary Age), a review (New Literary Age then New Age), a collection (Les romans of the New Age) at the Éditions Valois. He devotes all his energy to the promotion of proletarian literature, introduces many authors from the world of work. New Literary Age (1930), his manifesto book traces the history of this literature. "This is, in our opinion, proletarian literature: the fact of using the 'written thing' to stand up."

His humanitarian, pacifist and anti-militarist commitment has been seen on many occasions:

- In 1925, he signed a manifesto against the war in Morocco.

- In 1927, he signed a petition, along with Alain, Lucien Descaves, Louis Guilloux, Jules Romains, Séverine, against a law on the general organization of the nation at times of war which abrogated all intellectual independence and all freedom of opinion. His name rubbed . The petition published on 15 April in Europe.

- in 1939, he is jailed for a short while because he signed a pacifist leaflet by Louis Lecoin.

=== Publisher ===
He sought to promote proletarian literature, differentiating it from populism and from the literature of communist proletarians. Following on from the work of Jules Michelet, Charles Péguy, Georges Sorel, but also Ramuz, he called for a literature made by the people and for the people, which should be the work of writers originating from the people. Two examples are Constant Malva, a minor from Borinage or Rose Combe, an Auvergne gatekeeper, which he publishes in his series "The novels of the New Age". To be "authentic", the writer must have a thorough knowledge of the environment he wants to portray. The writer who wants to describe the working class must therefore be born in this class. "To talk about poverty, you have to have known it," says Poulaille. From the 1940s, he turned to other manifestations of popular culture, such as "Christmas carols”, "chanson de toile" and became interested in new media (records and cinema).
