= Blérancourt =

- Commune
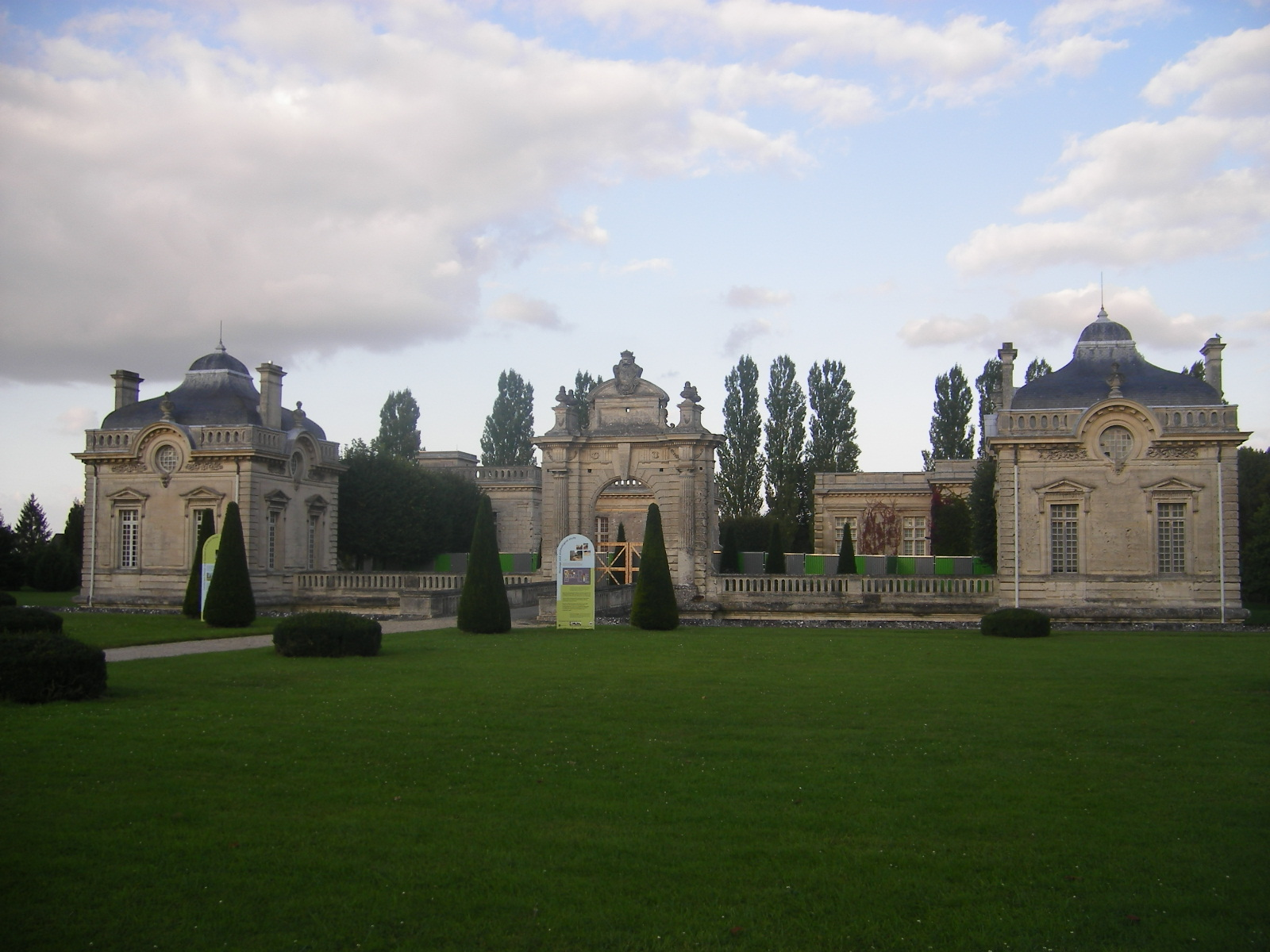
- Chateau

- Coat of arms
- Location of Blérancourt
- Location within France Location within Hauts-de-France
- Coordinates: 49°31′01″N 3°09′05″E
- Country: France
- Region: Hauts-de-France
- Department: Aisne
- Arrondissement: Laon
- Canton: Vic-sur-Aisne

Government
  - Mayor (2026–32): Stéphane Boullon
- Area^{1}: 10.8 km^{2} (4.2 sq mi)
- Elevation: 60 m (200 ft)
- Highest elevation: 159 m (522 ft)
- Lowest elevation: 53 m (174 ft)
- Population (2023): 1,162
  - Density: 108/km^{2} (279/sq mi)
- Time zone: UTC+01:00 (CET)
  - Summer (DST): UTC+02:00 (CEST)
- INSEE/Postal code: 02093 /02300
- ^{1} French Land Register data, which excludes lakes, ponds, glaciers > 1 km^{2} (0.386 sq mi or 247 acres) and river estuaries.

Blérancourt (French pronunciation: [bleʁɑ̃kuʁ]) is a commune in the department of Aisne in Hauts-de-France in northern France.

== Population ==
Historical population
Year	Pop.	±% p.a.
1968	988	—
1975	1,115	+1.74%
1982	1,177	+0.78%
1990	1,270	+0.96%
1999	1,193	−0.69%
2007	1,260	+0.69%
2012	1,229	−0.50%
2017	1,290	+0.97%
2023	1,162	−1.73%
Source: INSEE

== Sights ==
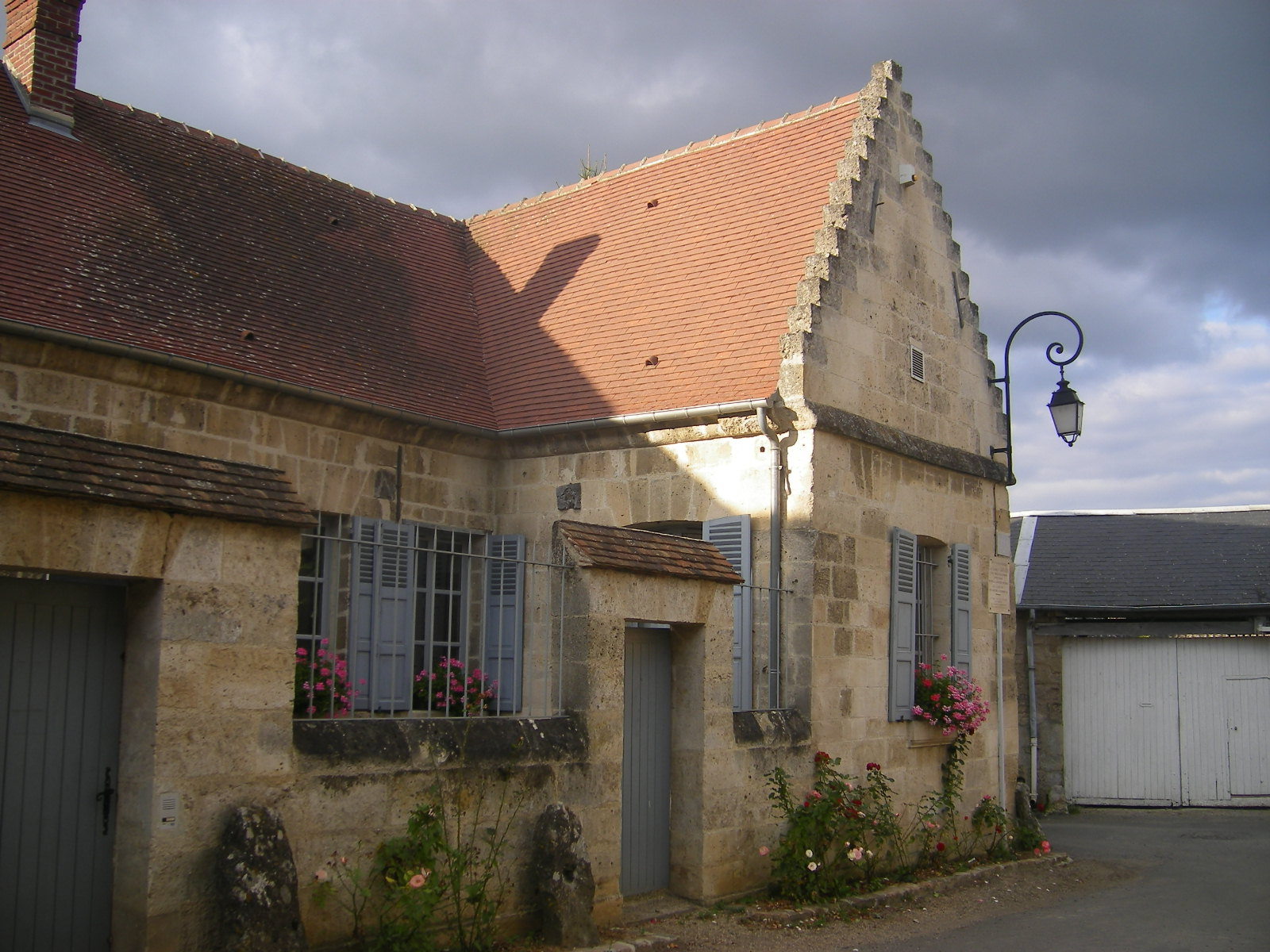
Louis Saint-Just's home in Blérancourt, which is now a museum and tourist office.

The Château de Blérancourt, an influential design by Salomon de Brosse houses the National Museum of French-American Friendship and Cooperation, (Musée franco-américain), founded by Anne Morgan, daughter of the financier J. Pierpont Morgan. The collections of the Museum include many works on the theme of World War I, among them several paintings of Joseph-Félix Bouchor. It was reopened after renovation in 2017.

The corps de logis of the château no longer exists, but de Brosse's twin cubical stone pavilions and a grand entrance gateway approached by a stone bridge across a moat (now dry) survive. The pavilions have identical façades on all sides, framed in rusticated quoins at the corners: each consists of a pair of pedimented windows that make a composition with a central œil de bœuf window under a semicyclical arch that carries the dentilled cornice across and breaks into the roof balustrading above. Slate roofs with cyma curves converge to a central four-sided cap. The central gateway takes the form of a triumphal arch with a prominent keystone. The Jardins du Nouveau Monde, on its grounds, contain an arboretum and garden plants from the New World.

The house of Louis Antoine de Saint-Just now houses a museum devoted to the French Revolution.

== Notable people from Blérancourt ==
- Claude-Nicolas Le Cat (1700-1768) anatomist and surgeon.
- Louis Antoine de Saint-Just (1767-1794) revolutionary and author.

== See also ==
- Communes of the Aisne department
- Musée Franco-Américain website
