= Philippe Charbonneaux =

French industrial designer (1917–1998)

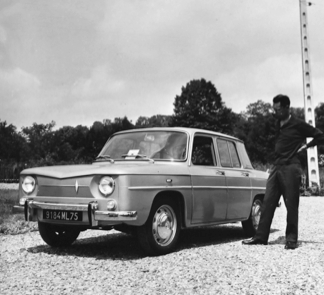
Philippe Charbonneaux with a Renault 8

Philippe Charbonneaux (18 February 1917 – 4 June 1998) was a French industrial designer, best known for automobile and truck design, but also known for other products such as television sets. Many of his works are now exhibited in places such as Centre Georges Pompidou in Paris, or Museum of Modern Art in New York. He specialised in car design studies, so he has left many inventive prototypes. The Ellipsis concept car, released just two years prior to his death, is still very fresh and modern. He designed for Rosengart, Renault, Ford, Delahaye, Berliet, Bugatti, and others.

Famous designs include the Téléavia Panoramic III TV set; the Renault 8 in 1962; the Renault 16 in 1965 (which he designed together with Gaston Juchet), an innovative family car and Europe's Car of the Year for 1965; as well as the 1986 Renault 21.

His private collection of approximately 160 vintage cars, including racing cars, and 40 motorcycles, donated to S.C.A.R. (Salon of Vintage Car Club Collectors in Reims) is the basis for the Automobile Museum Reims-Champagne, established in 1985.
