= BSA Scout =

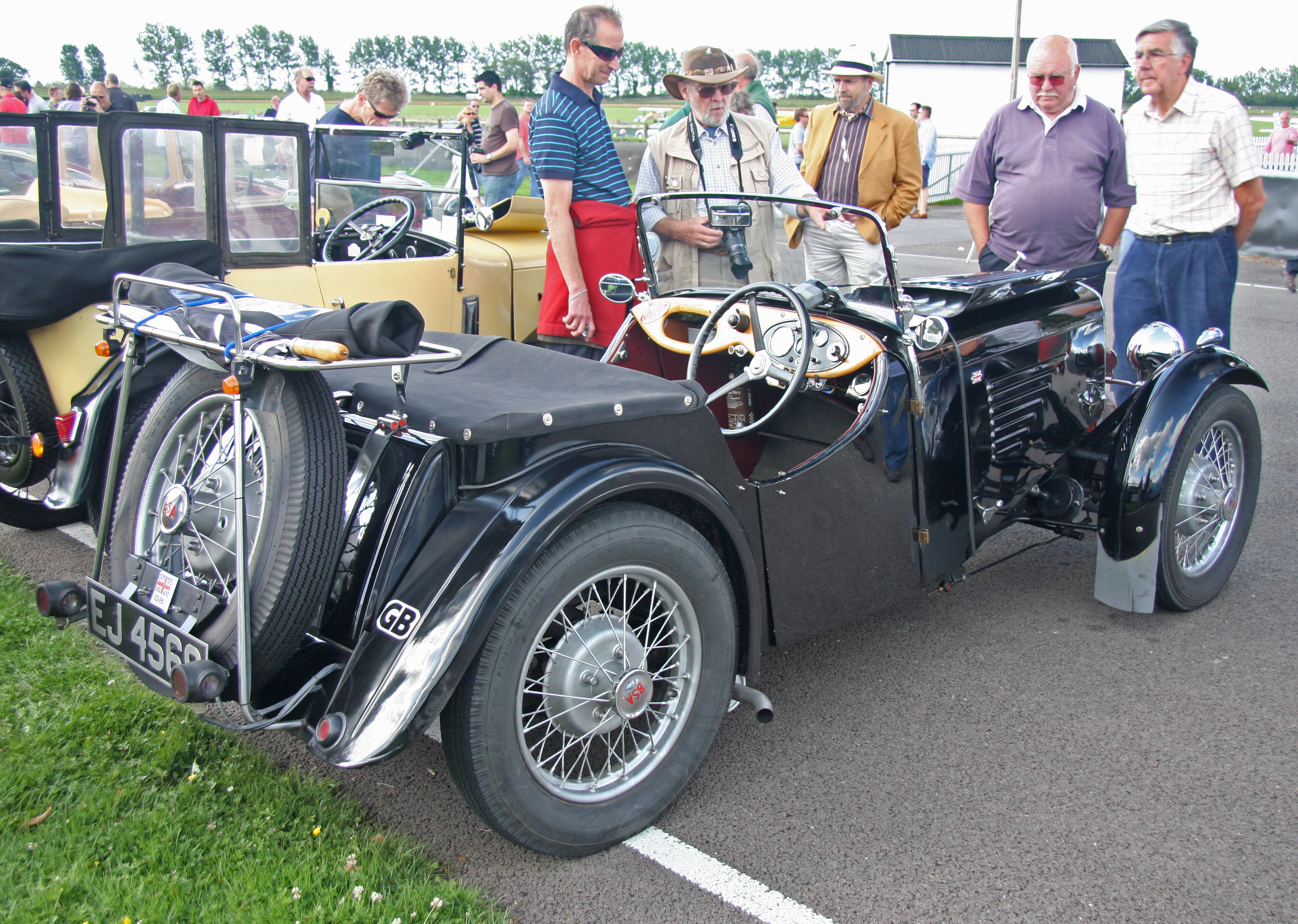
- Nine open 2-seater 1935 series I

Overview
- Manufacturer: BSA Cycles Limited
- Production: Early 1935
- Assembly: Birmingham

Body and chassis
- Class: Sports car
- Body style: Open 2-seater, open 4-seater, coupé
- Layout: FMF

Powertrain
- Engine: 1,075 cc 4-cylinder in-line sv
- Transmission: 3-speed manual gearbox, multi-plate clutch with a worm final drive. From the differential assembly a short universally jointed propeller shaft runs out transversely to each front wheel

Dimensions
- Wheelbase: 2-seater 90 in (2,300 mm); 4-seater 93 in (2,400 mm)) coupé 93 in (2,400 mm)
- Length: 2-seater 135 in (3,400 mm); 4-seater 146 in (3,700 mm)) coupé 140 in (3,600 mm)
- Width: 52 in (1,300 mm)
- Height: 2-seater 54 1/2 in (1,380 mm); 4-seater 57 in (1,400 mm)) coupé 54 1/2 in (1,380 mm)
- Kerb weight: 2-seater 11 long cwt 2 qr (1,290 lb or 580 kg); 4-seater 12 long cwt 2 qr (1,400 lb or 640 kg) coupé 14 long cwt 0 qr (1,570 lb or 710 kg)

Nine engine

Overview
- Manufacturer: BSA Cycles Limited
- Production: 1933? to 1936

Layout
- Configuration: 4-cylinder in-line
- Displacement: 1,075 cubic centimetres (66 cu in)
- Cylinder bore: 60 mm (2.4 in)
- Piston stroke: 95 mm (3.7 in)
- Cylinder block material: cast iron, in one piece with crankcase
- Cylinder head material: cast iron, detachable
- Valvetrain: side-valve

Combustion
- Fuel system: Solex carburettor, mechanical pump from 10 gallon tank at rear
- Oil system: gear type pump by skew gears from crankshaft
- Cooling system: water

Output
- Power output: not reported Tax rating 8.9 h.p.

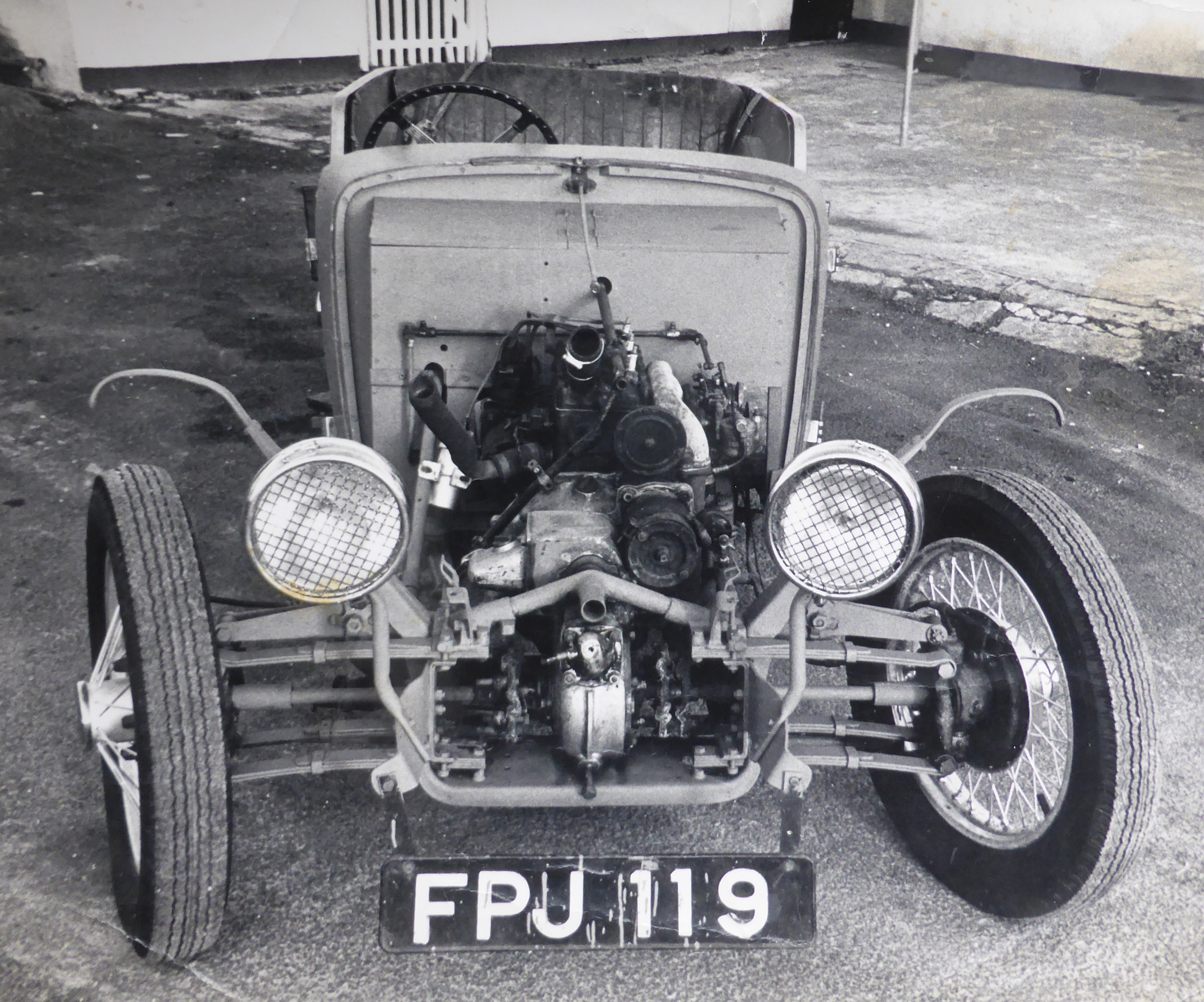
Suspension, transmission brake and differential

Ten engine

Overview
- Manufacturer: BSA Cycles Limited
- Production: 1936 to 1939

Layout
- Configuration: 4-cylinder in-line
- Displacement: 1,203 cubic centimetres (73 cu in)
- Cylinder bore: 63.5 mm (2.50 in)
- Piston stroke: 95 mm (3.7 in)
- Cylinder block material: cast iron, in one piece with crankcase
- Cylinder head material: cast iron, detachable
- Valvetrain: side-valve, camshaft driven by duplex chain

Combustion
- Fuel system: Solex carburettor, (optional twin an extra five guineas), mechanical pump from 10 gallon tank at rear (6 gallons on four-seater and coupé)
- Fuel type: petrol (tank has a quick-action filler cap)
- Oil system: gear type pump by skew gears from crankshaft, de luxe tourer and coupé cars have an oil-pressure-warning green light on the dashboard, other cars have a pressure gauge
- Cooling system: water

Output
- Power output: not reported Tax rating 9.8 h.p.

The BSA Scout is a small open two-seater front-wheel drive car, manufactured and sold by subsidiaries of The Birmingham Small Arms Company Limited, launched at the beginning of April 1935. On account of its front-wheel drive and low centre of gravity it was said to be remarkably stable taking corners in safety which would be impossible with a normal design. This new addition to the range of small open cars for young motorists was intended to further embellish BSA's reputation for sound design, robust construction and complete reliability.

== Mechanicals ==
At the front of the car was the engine, clutch, gearbox and a short stiff propeller shaft to the worm and spur driven differential and front wheel brake. All these mechanicals were (flexibly) mounted as one unit positioned in a reverse to the usual order, the differential at the very front of the car.

=== Engine ===
The car's four-cylinder, 9 (RAC) horsepower 1,075 cc (65.6 cu in) engine and transmission had powered thousands of BSA three-wheelers over the previous five years.

=== Transmission ===
The gearbox was centrally controlled by a lever in the facia providing three forward speeds and reverse The propeller shafts from the differential to each wheel had flexible fabric joints and enclosed universal joints. The multi-plate clutch had two light alloy discs with cork inserts and ran in oil.

=== Chassis ===
The conventionally designed chassis was made of channel section side members suitably braced by cross members. Suspension was by eight quarter-elliptic springs in front—four to each wheel giving independent front springing.

Rear suspension was by ordinary half-elliptical springs to a beam axle.
The single brake for the front wheels was a part of the differential unit. The rear brakes were on each wheel.

Electrical equipment was six-volt and a five lamp set supplied with dip and switch control to the head lights was included. The tyre size is 4 1/2 by 18 inches (110 mm × 460 mm).

== Bodies ==
The pneumatic cushioned upholstery was leather and the frame of the body of ash panelled in aluminium. An open two-seater, it had attractive and sporting lines yet with enough leg and elbow room.

During 1936 an open four-seater sports tourer body also became available at £169.10.0. and a two-seater coupé complete with recessed traffic indicators, sunshine roof and other closed car fittings: £185. These bodies became known as series 3.

A new two-seater drophead coupé was announced in August 1939 (similar to the car which won the coachwork award in the Welsh Rally. The price was to be £195

== Price ==
Initially (open two-seater) £149.10.0

== Performance ==
The car was built for speeds approaching 70 mph (110 km/h). Petrol consumption was expected to be an average of 35 to 40 miles per imperial gallon (8.1 to 7.1 L/100 km; 29 to 33 mpg_{‑US}).

== Series 2 – Engine upgrade ==
For the October 1936 Earls Court Motor Show the engine capacity was increased to 1,203 cc (73.4 cu in).

== Series 3 – variants of 2 ==
Also for the October 1936 Motor Show—either a two-seater coupé by Mulliners or a 4-seater open tourer on the same chassis as the 2-seater named series 2.

== Series 4 – August 1937 ==
Shock absorbers were fitted all round. Front braking was now by brakes on the front wheels.

- The price of the two-seater and the two-seater de luxe had been reduced to £149.10.0 and £156.10.0 respectively.
- Four-seater £159.10.0
- Four-seater de luxe £166.10.0
- Coupé de luxe £179. The coupé was now only available with the de luxe equipment.

The motoring correspondent of The Times described the two-seater as "a rakish looking body with two wide cut-away doors with cord-operated locks and pockets. The floor is flat and unobstructed, there is luggage space in the tonneau behind the squab with a cover, and the hood folds down completely when it is concealed. There is a single panel safety glass folding screen with a curved top line and the detachable side screens are stored behind the squab. The instruments are in front of the driver with a good-sized cupboard and grabrail on the left."

"The coupé two-seater is of airline type and there is a bench type of seat with adjustment to the back and good luggage space behind. A sliding roof, safety glass windows, a windscreen which can be wound out, a rear blind, ventilators in the side of the scuttle, large headlamps with stone guards, a spare wheel, door locks, a sports spring steering wheel, flush fitting traffic indicators, a roof light and an inside reflecting mirror are included."

== Series 5 ==
A switch to a more powerful 12-volt electrical system and to Bendix cable brakes.

== Series 6 – October 1938 ==
Easy-clean (pressed steel) wheels are now fitted in place of the wire wheels. The coupé is now a 4-seater. The 9.8 engine has been redesigned, water-jacketing has been increased and a three-bearing crankshaft incorporating improved lubrication is now provided. Induction improvements include larger valves and a downdraught carburettor. The front and rear tracks are now the same—4 ft 0 in (1.22 m) and the wheelbase of all cars is now 7 ft 11 1/4 in (2.419 m).

A new drophead coupé 2-seater was announced on 1 August 1939 but war broke out on 3 September and very few of these cars were made.

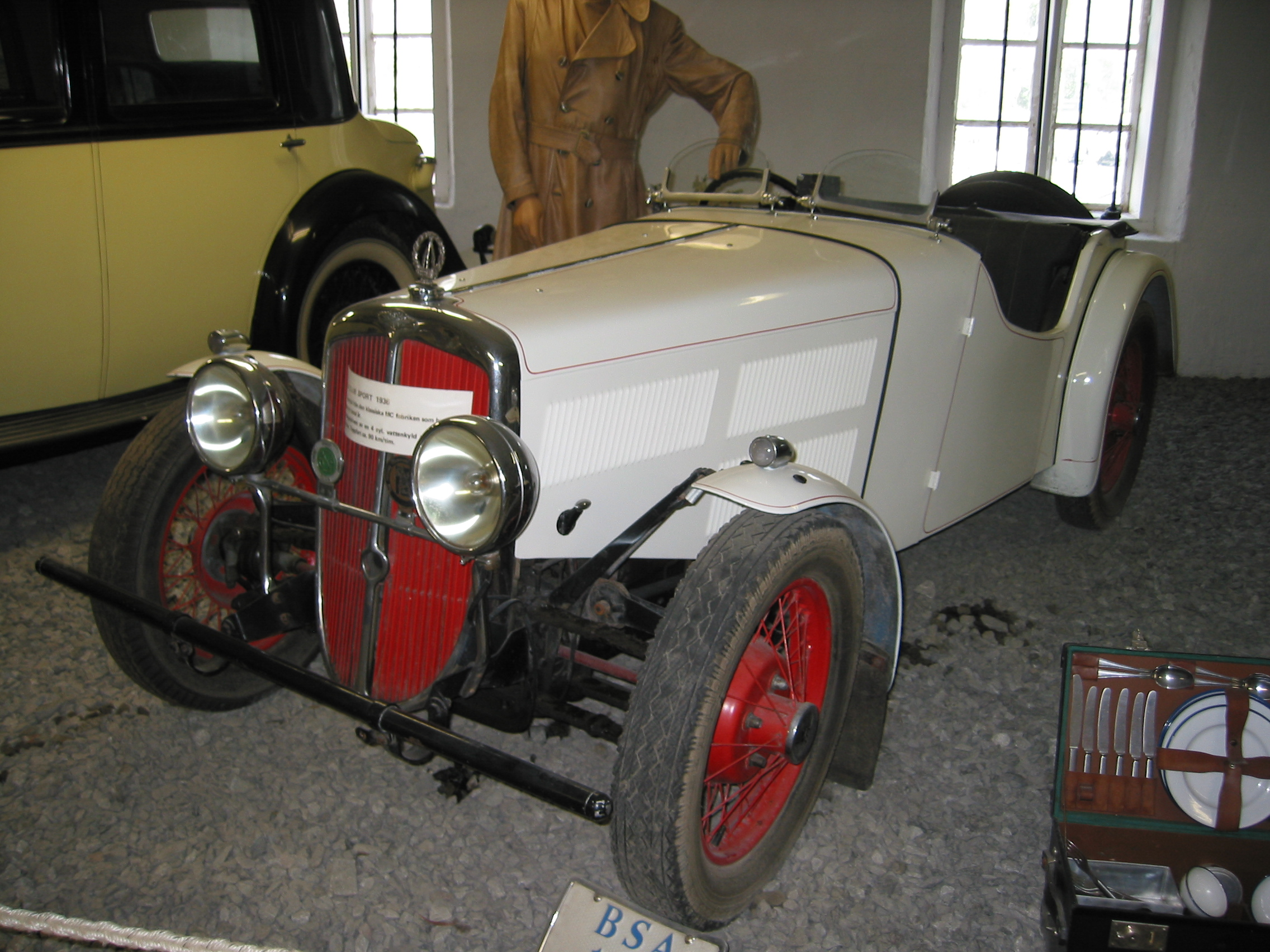
series 2
open 2-seater standard,
1936 example

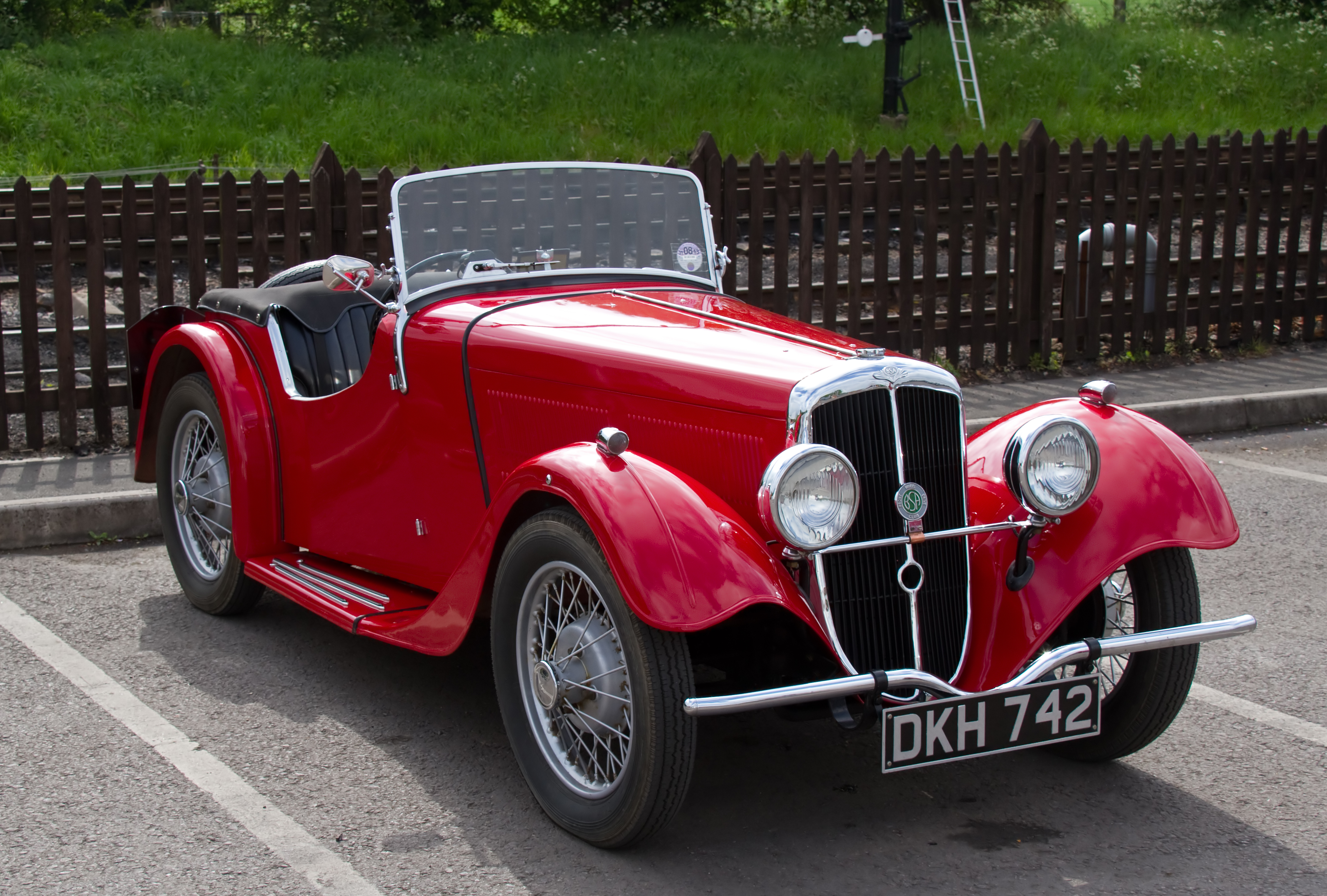
series 4
open 2-seater
1936 example

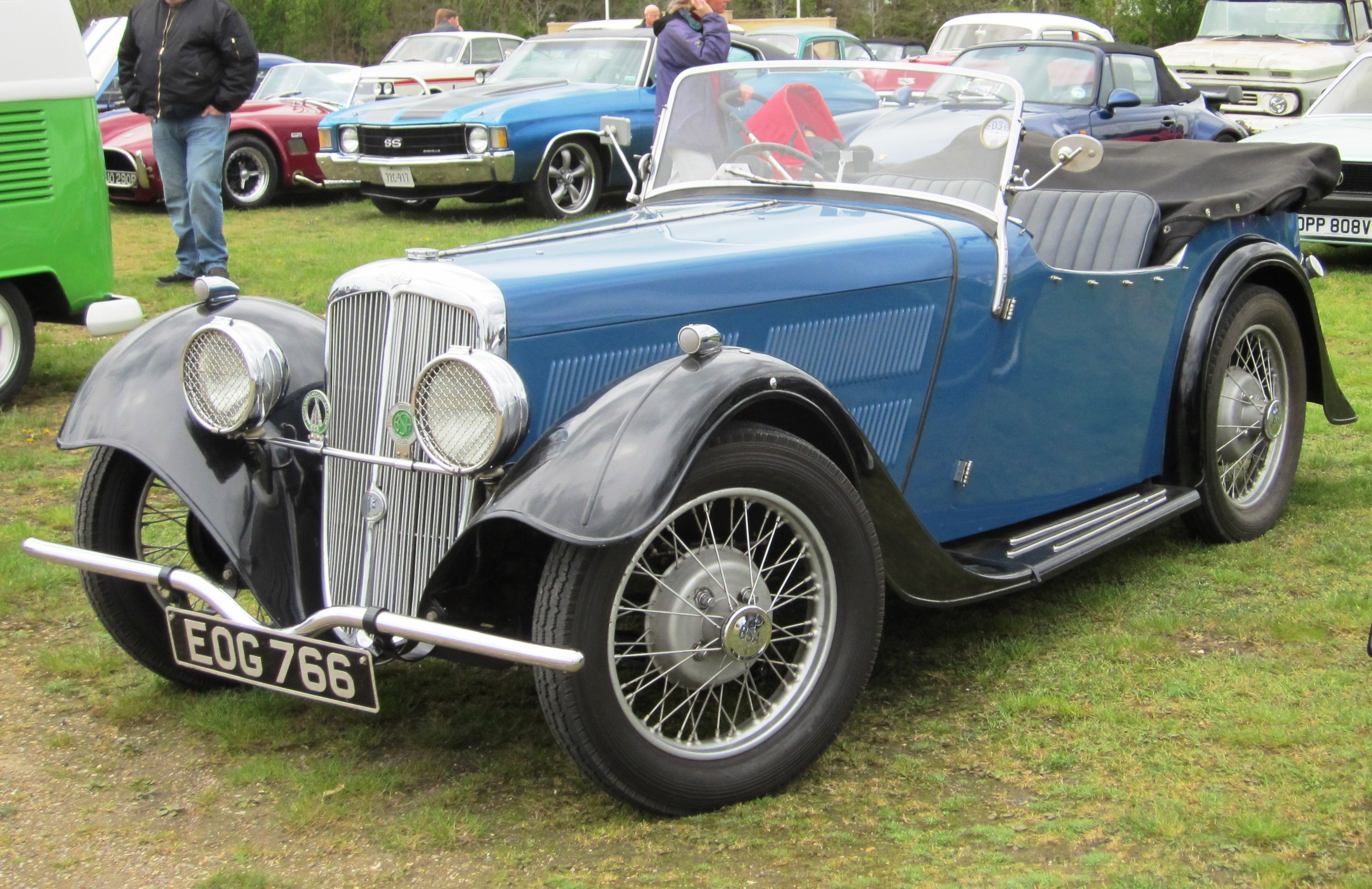
series 4
4-seater de luxe
1938 example

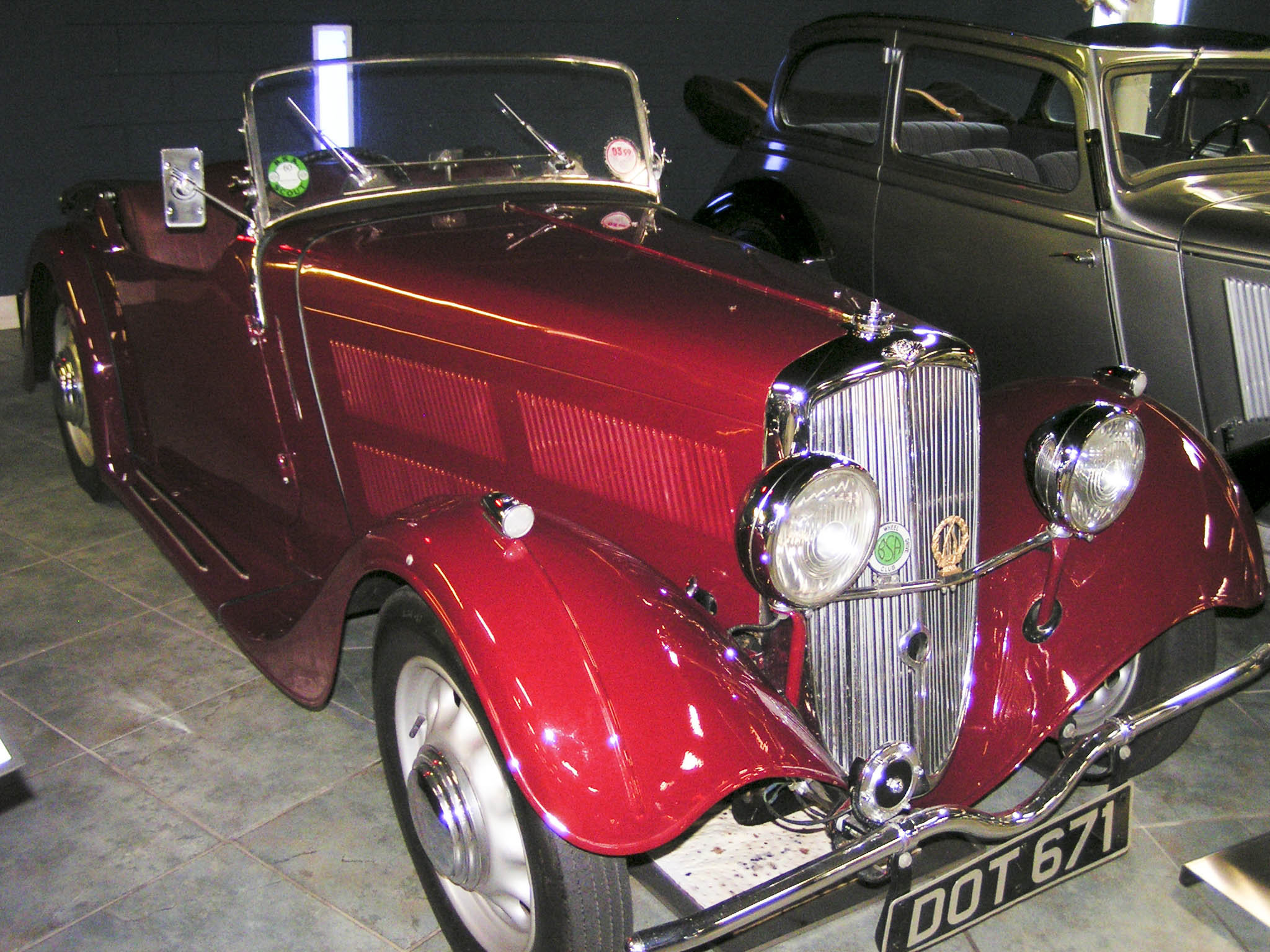
series 6
2-seater de luxe
1939 example

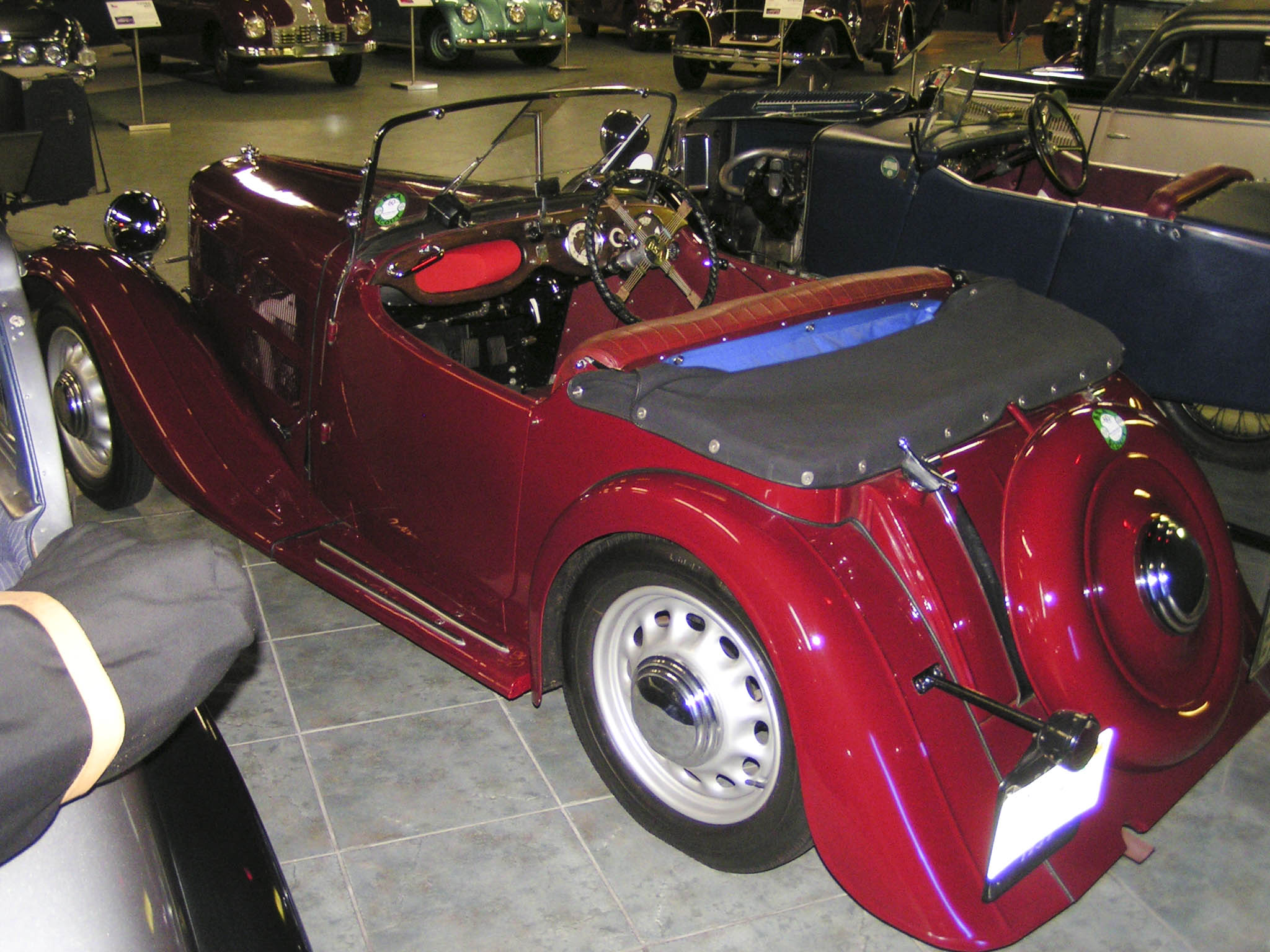
series 6
2-seater de luxe
1939 example

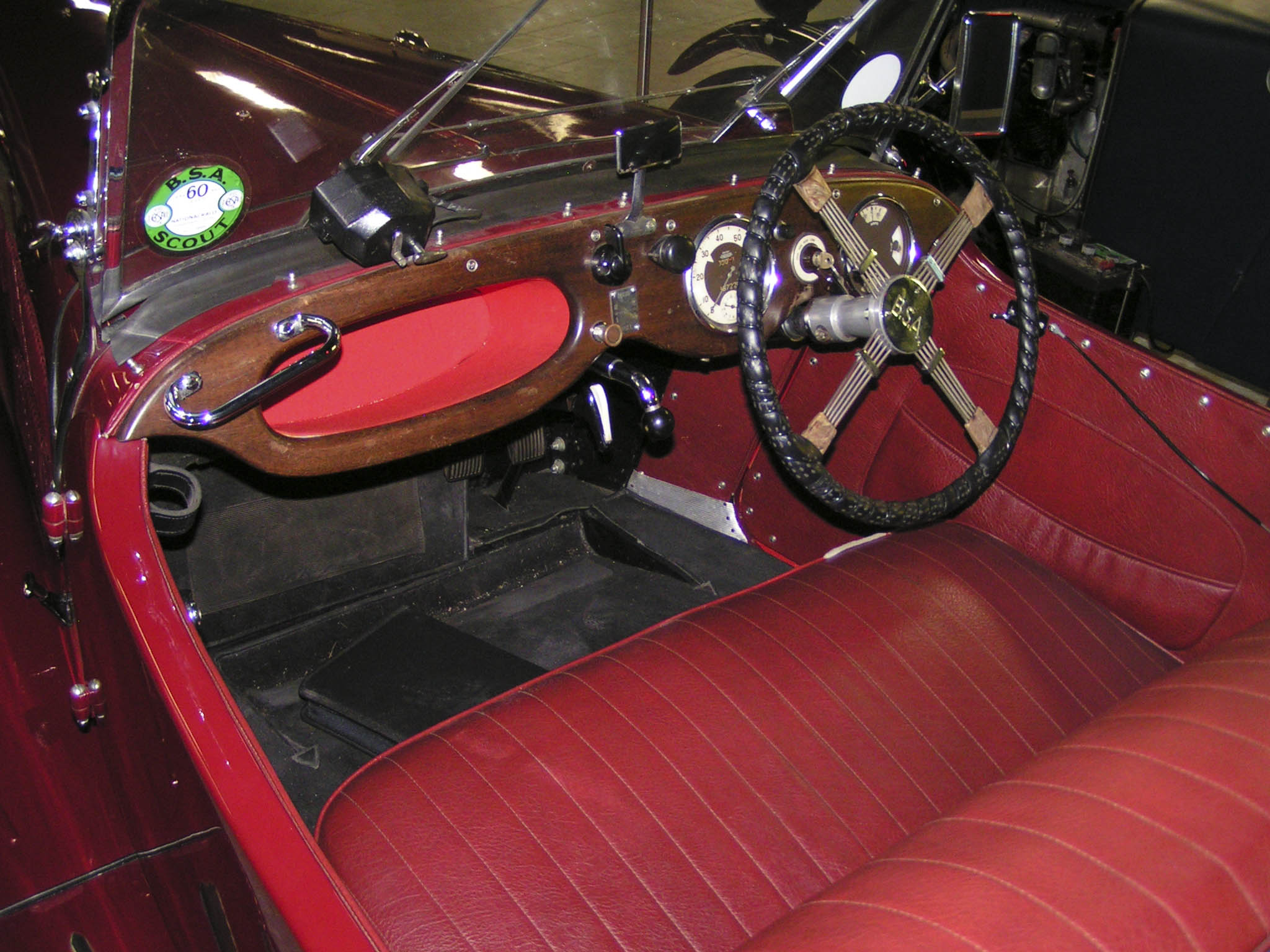
series 6
2-seater de luxe interior
1939 example
