= Front-mid-engine, front-wheel-drive layout =

Motor vehicle layout

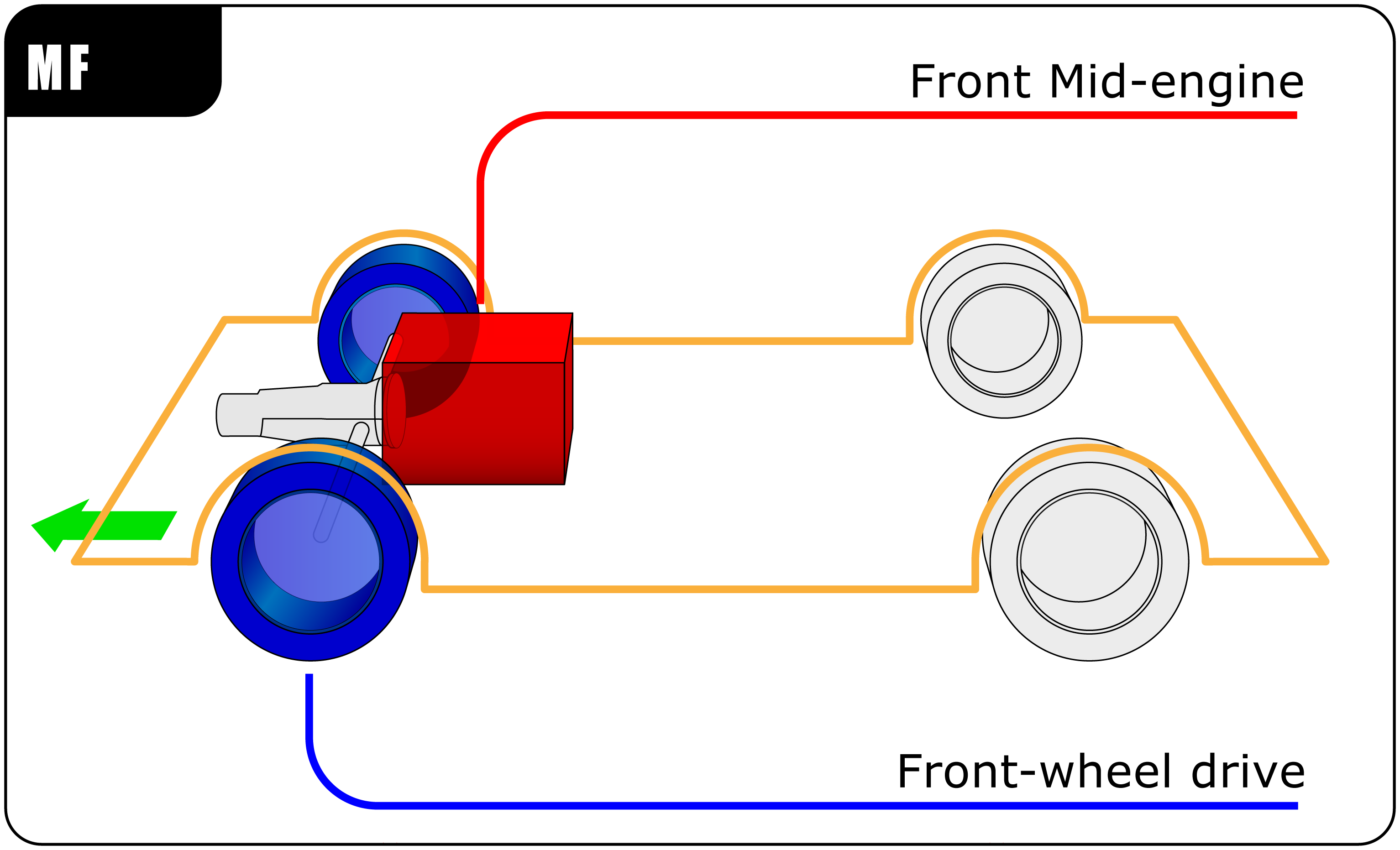
FMF layout

In automotive design, a front-mid-engine, front-wheel-drive layout (also called more simply "mid-engine, front-wheel-drive layout", and abbreviated MF or FMF) is one in which the front road wheels are driven by an internal-combustion engine placed just behind them, in front of the passenger compartment.

In contrast to the front-engine, front-wheel-drive layout (FF), the center of mass of the engine is behind the front axle. This layout is typically chosen for its better weight distribution (the heaviest component is near the center of the car, lowering its moment of inertia). Many early successful (and mostly French) mass-produced front-wheel drive cars used the MF layout, until the 1959 BMC (Austin / Morris) Mini demonstrated the layout and passenger car packaging benefits of mounting the engine transversely in front of the front axle. At first – when well executed – the packaging, space utilization and user experience of MF layout, even in a subcompact or supermini, like the Renault 16 or Renault 5, made many people consider the differences between the FF and MF layouts to be minor.

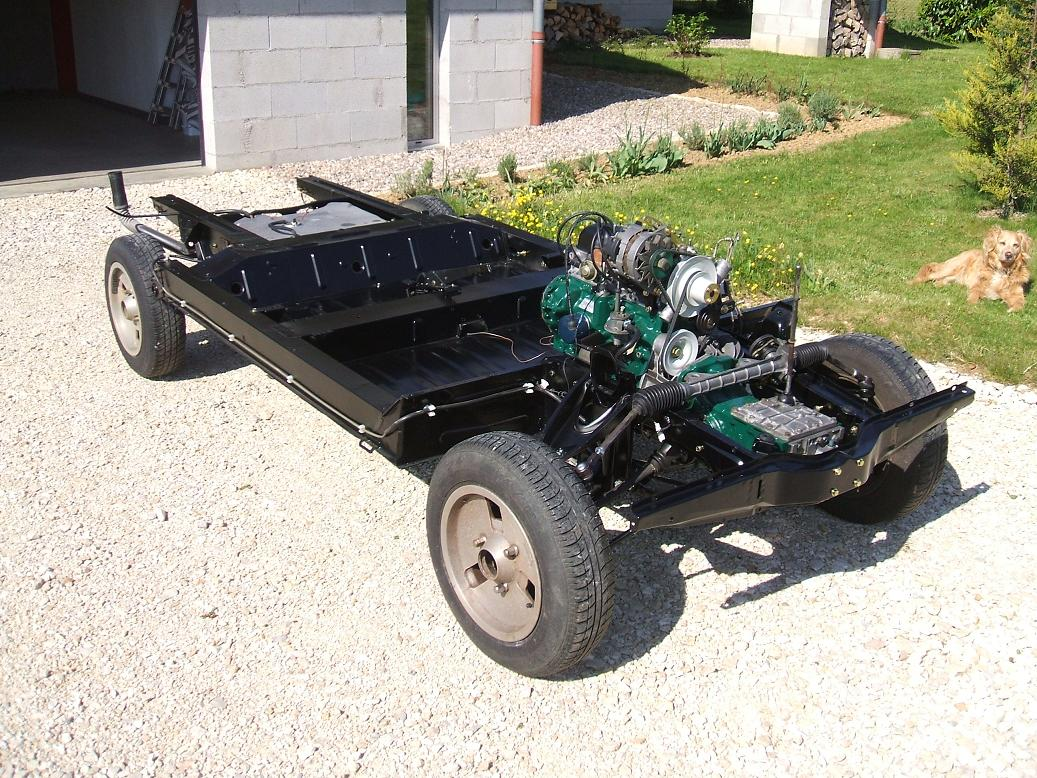
Renault 4 rolling chassis

However, the mid-engined layout uses central space. The FF layout has since completely supplanted the MF layout, and almost all manufacturers currently fit transverse engines.

Examples of road cars using the MF layout include the Cord 810, BSA Scout, Citroën Traction Avant, Citroën DS, Renault 4 (and derivatives R5 and R6), Renault 16, Saab 900, Saab Sonett I, the Citroën SM, as well as some commercial vehicles like the Tempo Matador. These vehicles have longitudinal mounted engines; transverse engined vehicles are possible in theory if the issue of passenger footwell location is addressed. The Toyota iQ comes close to this by having its front differential in front of the engine, however despite this, the iQ is still considered to have an FF layout.

Traditionally, the term mid-engine has been reserved for cars that place the engine and transaxle behind the driver and in front of the rear axles, as in the Lamborghini Countach or Ferrari Testarossa, but an engine placed in front of the driver's compartment but fully behind the front axle line also qualifies as mid-engine.

== Gallery ==
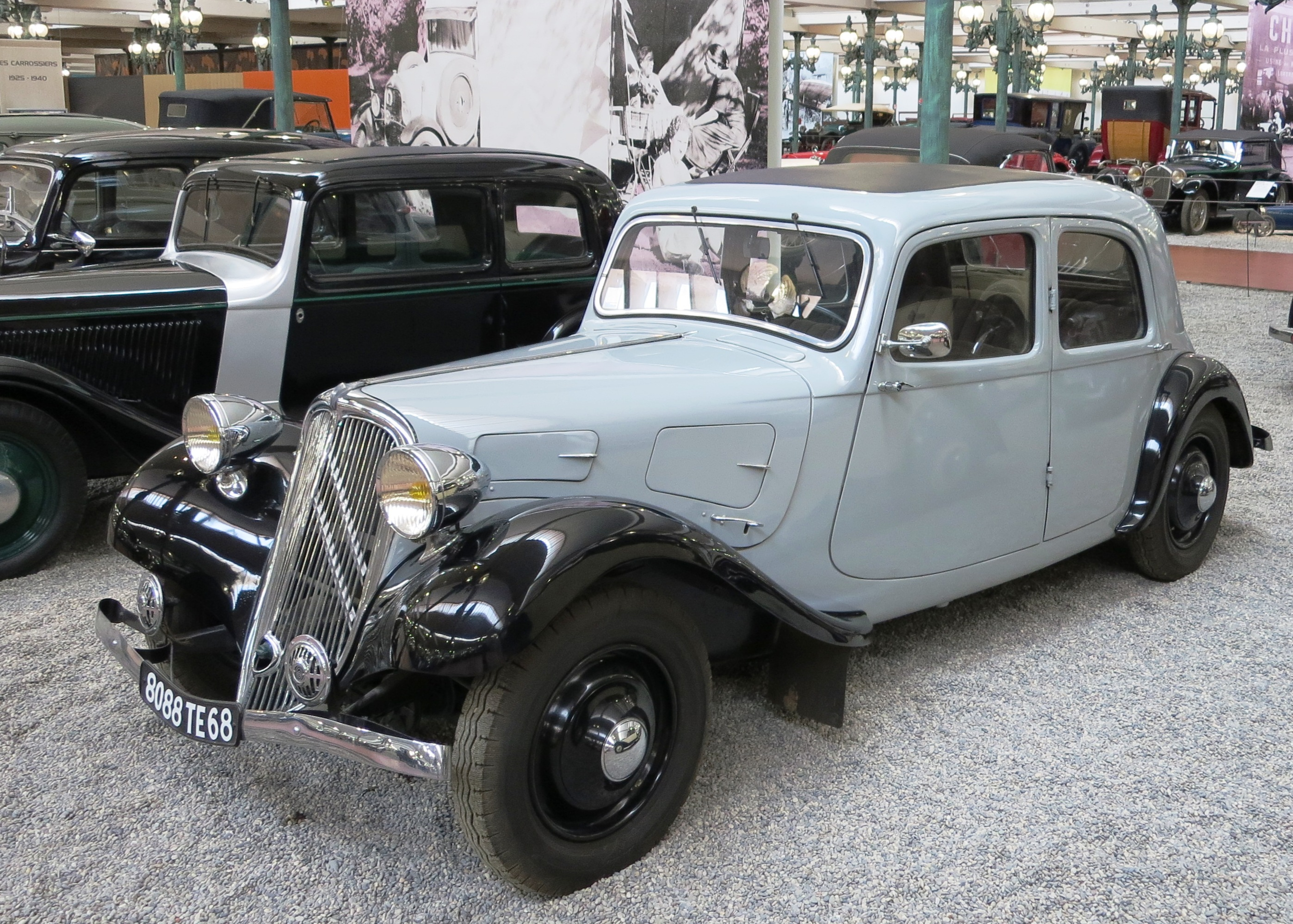
Citroën Traction Avant revolutionized auto design with its low slung unibody design bodywork.

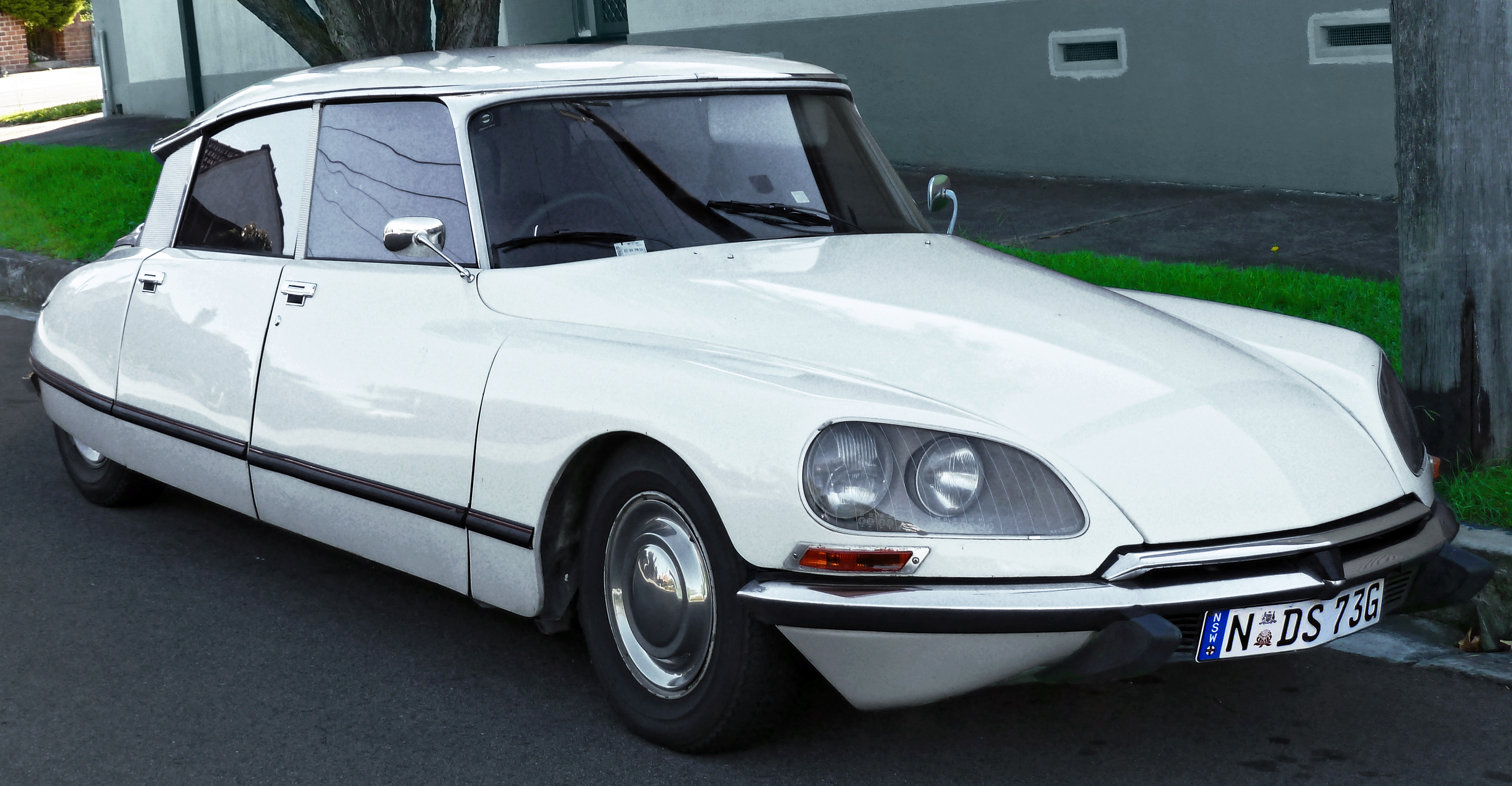
The 1955–1975 Citroën DS successor packed full of innovations, but retained the MF layout

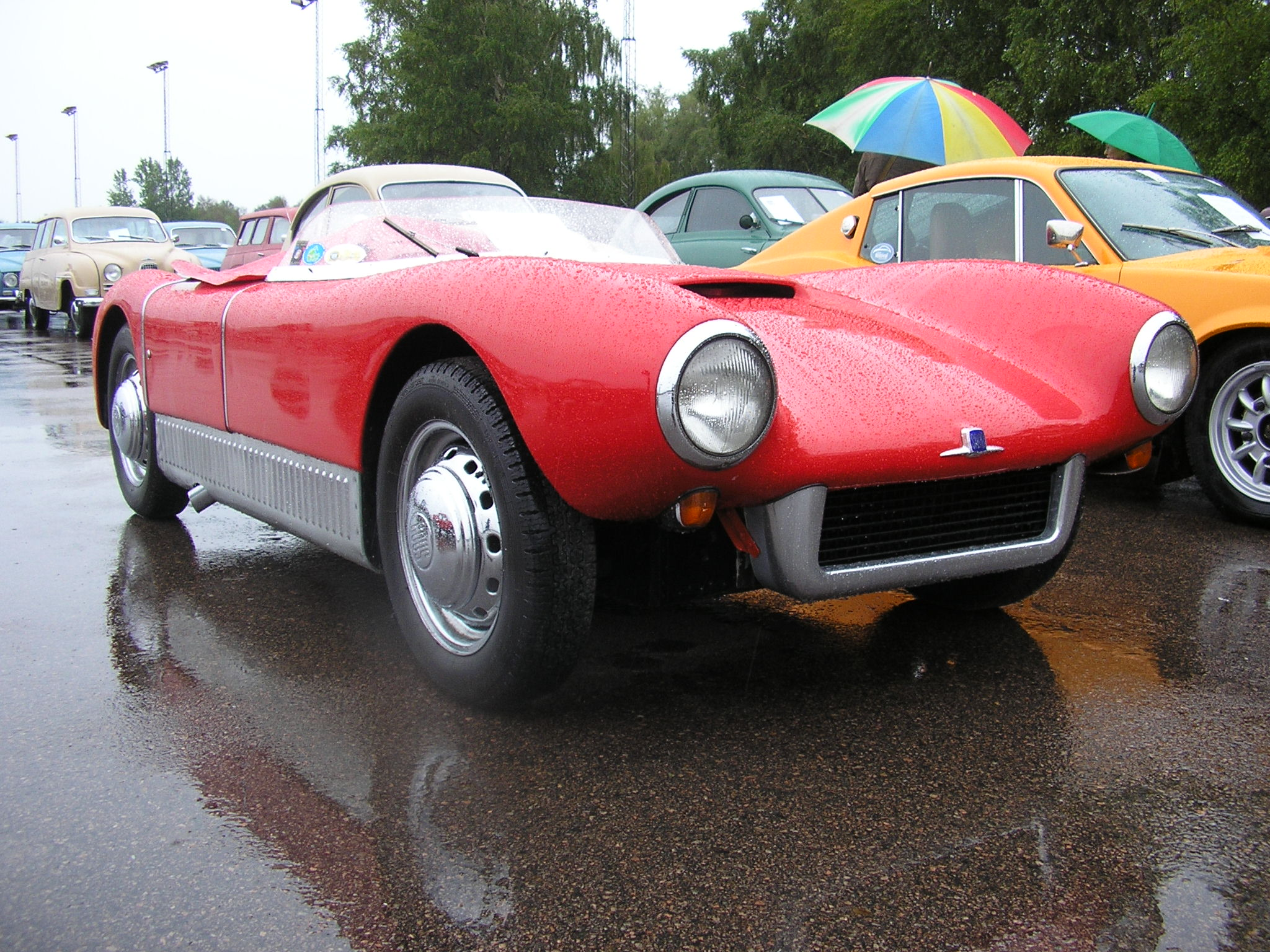
Saab Sonett mk1 used the MF layout by turning the engine and running it "backwards".

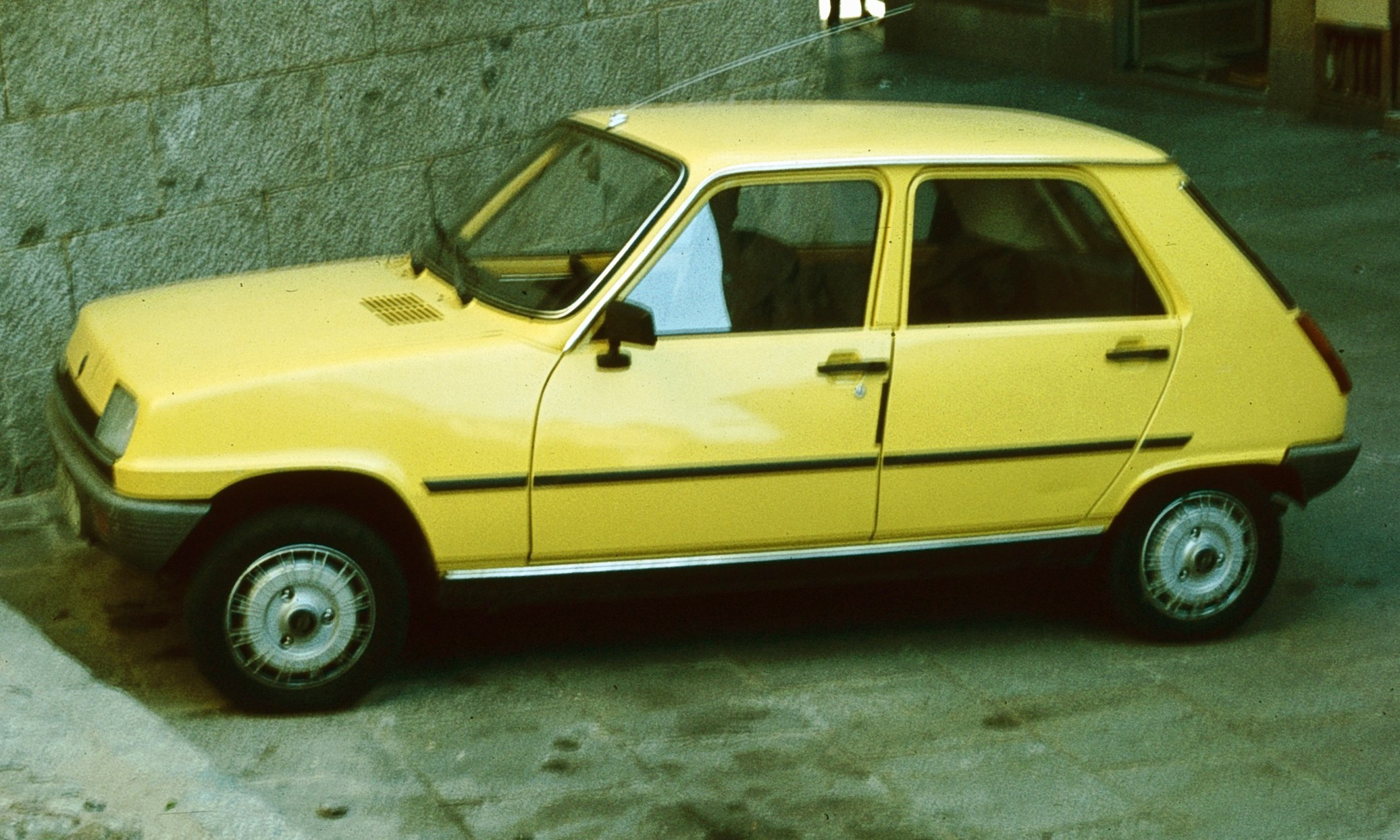
The 1972 Renault 5 was one of the last successful mid-engine, front-wheel-drive cars.

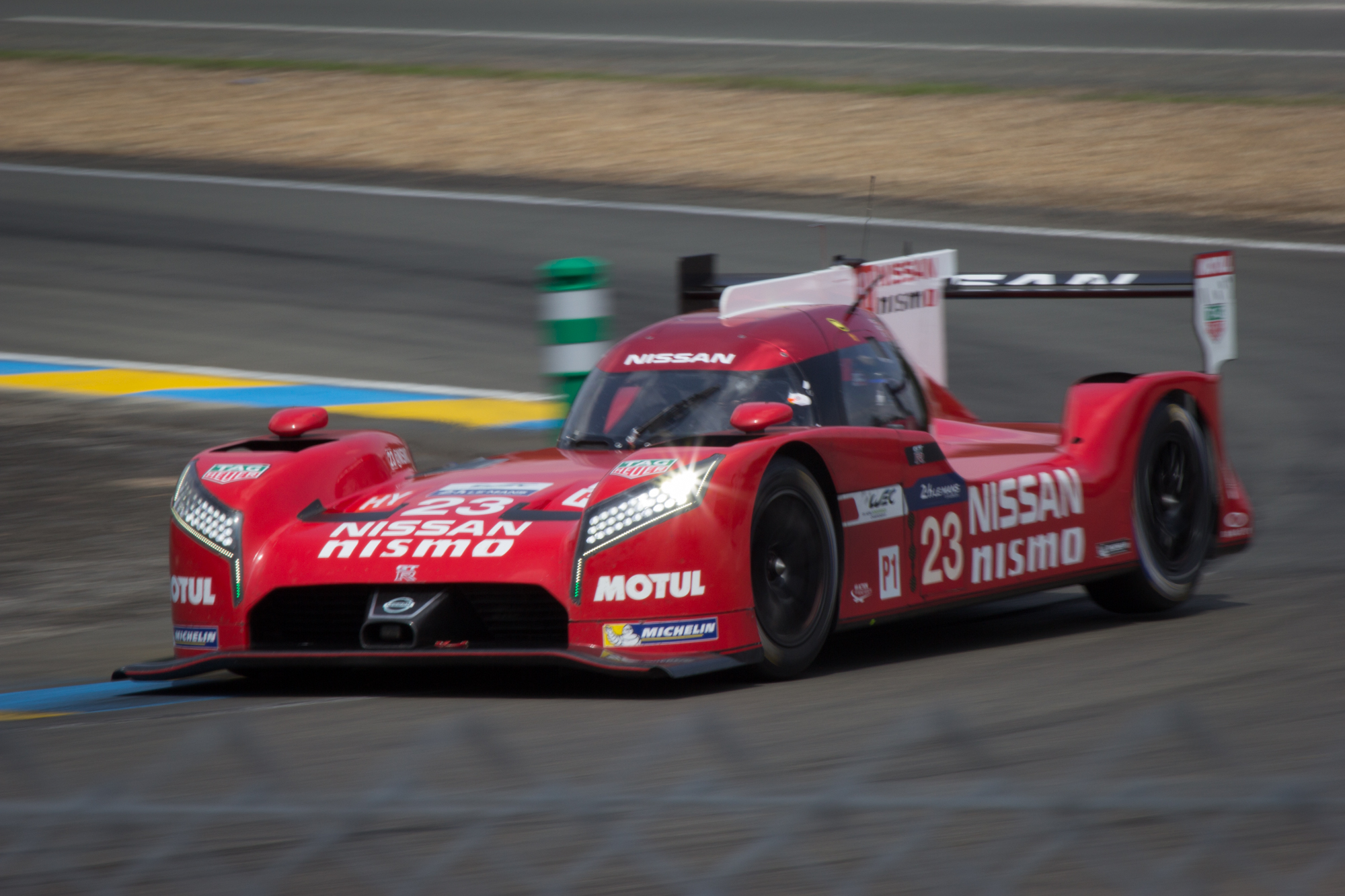
The Nissan GT-R LM Nismo was the only Le Mans Prototype race car with a front-mid-engine, front-wheel-drive layout.
