= Teleavia =

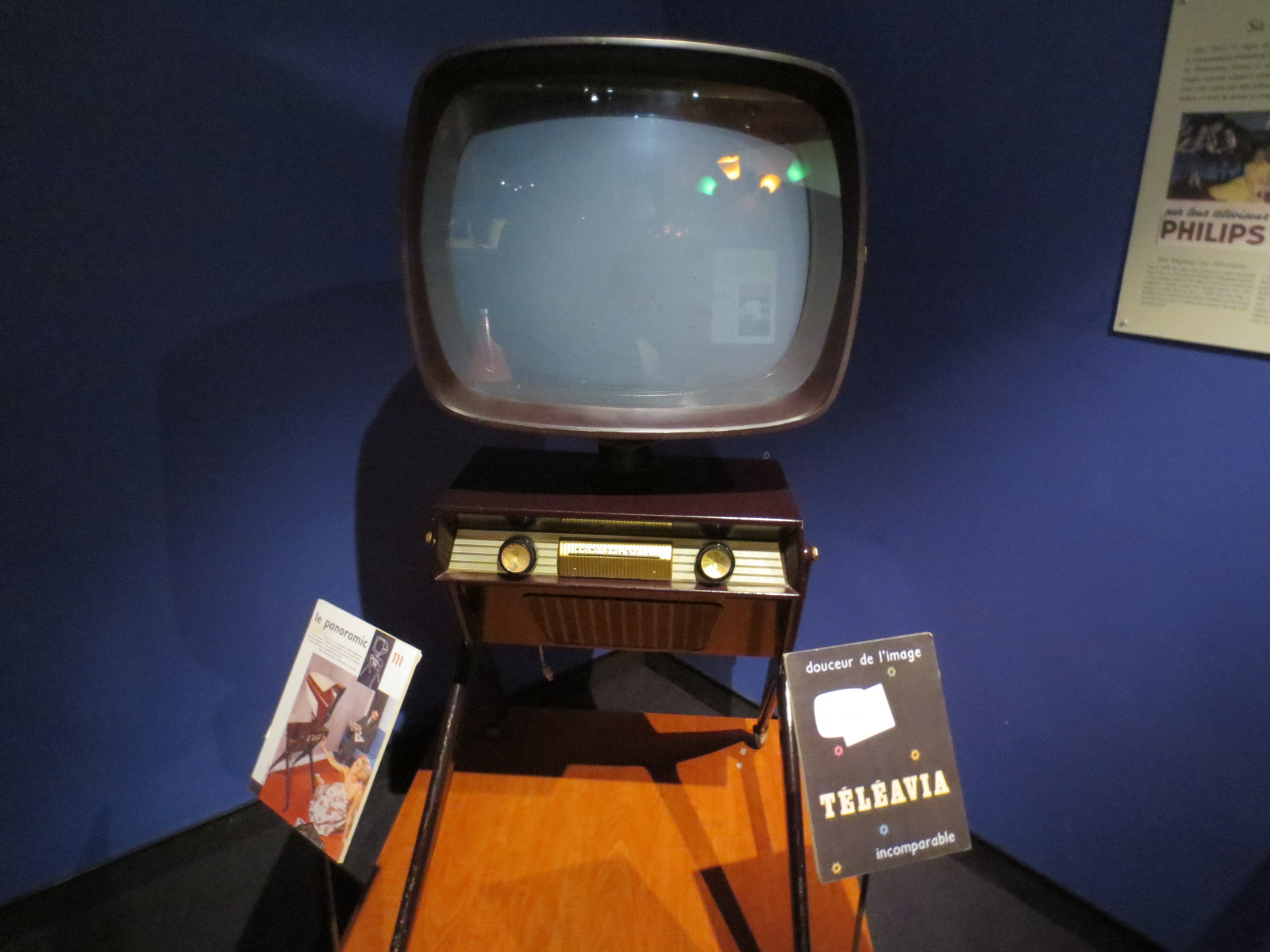
A 1957 Teleavia, designed by Philippe Charbonneaux

Teleavia was a French manufacturer of televisions in the mid-20th century, it was created by aviation company "Sud Aviation" as a diversification operation to employ redundant workforce. It was later absorbed by Thomson SA.

The brand was best known for the innovative television set designs created by the French designer Roger Tallon in the 1950s and 1960s. The 1968 edition, known as the Portavia 111, was the year's most photographed appliance.

Tallon later said, in explanation of the trademark's success and longevity: "It was the first time the shape, the function and the material absolutely intertwined".

The brand's motto, from 1963, was "TELEAVIA, design also matters".
