= Renault 16 =

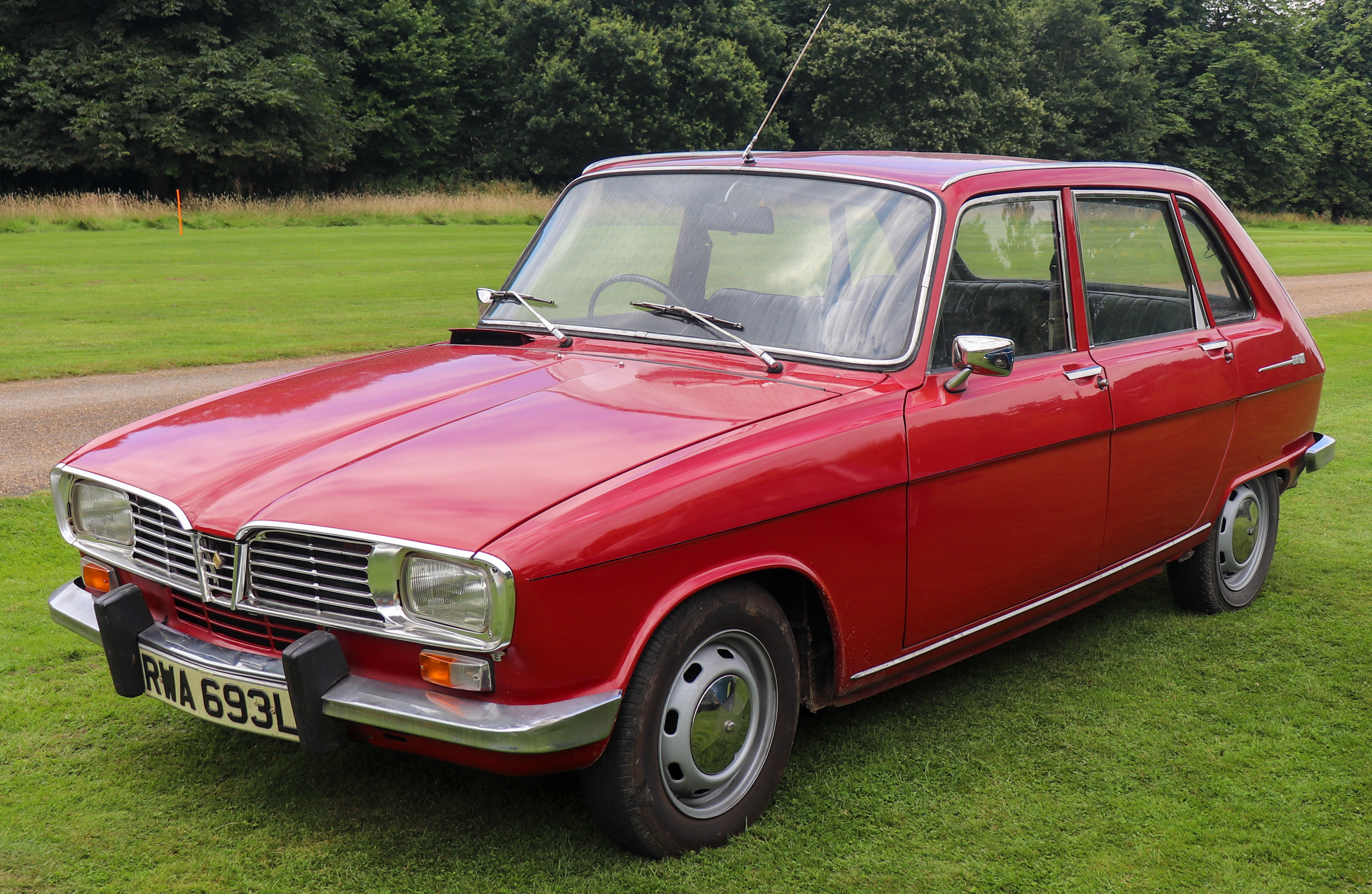
- 1972 Renault 16 TL

Overview
- Manufacturer: Renault
- Also called: Renault R16
- Production: 1965–1980; 1,845,959 built
- Assembly: France: Sandouville; France: Flins; Australia: Heidelberg West; Canada: Quebec, Montreal (SOMA-Renault); Yugoslavia: Novo Mesto (IMV); Morocco: Aïn Sebaâ (Somaca)
- Designer: Gaston Juchet

Body and chassis
- Class: Large family car (D)
- Body style: 5-door hatchback
- Layout: FMF layout

Powertrain
- Engine: 1470 cc A1K I4; 1565 cc A2L I4; 1647 cc A2M/A3M I4
- Transmission: 4-speed manual 5-speed manual 3-speed automatic

Dimensions
- Wheelbase: Left: 2,720 mm (107.1 in); Right: 2,650 mm (104.3 in)
- Length: 4,240 mm (166.9 in)
- Width: 1,628 mm (64.1 in)
- Height: 1,450 mm (57.1 in)
- Curb weight: 980–1,060 kg (2,161–2,337 lb)

Chronology
- Predecessor: Renault Frégate
- Successor: Renault 20; Renault 18

The Renault 16 (R16) is a large family car which was manufactured and marketed over a single generation by French automaker Renault between 1965 and 1980 in Le Havre, France. A five-door hatchback, the 16 was the first French car to win of the European Car of the Year award.

== Market placement ==
In the early 1960s Renault was building a series of small cars, including the hatchback Renault 4 and rear engine Renault Dauphine and aimed to replace its larger family car, the Renault Frégate model (1951–1960) which had managed a modest production total of 163,383 units.

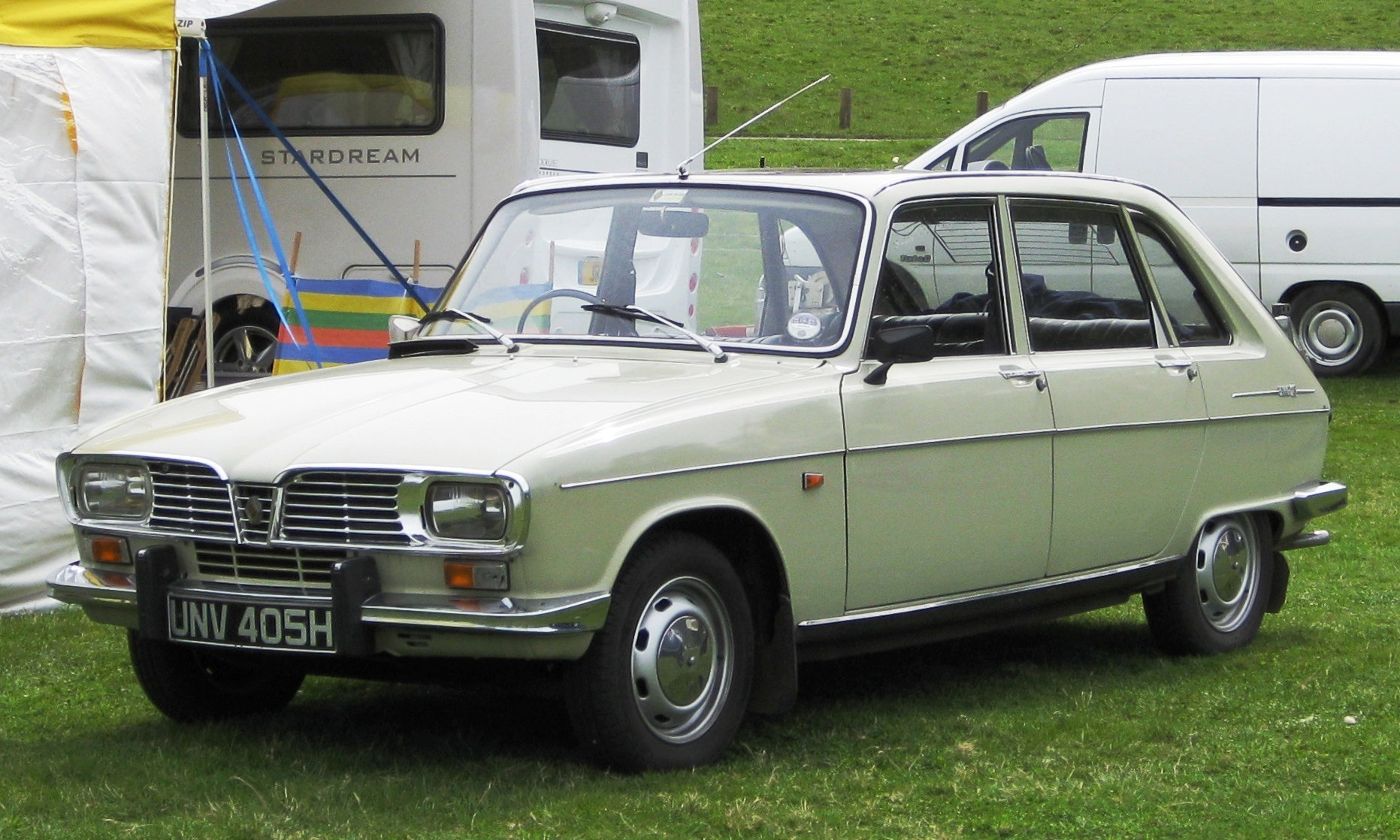
1969 Renault 16

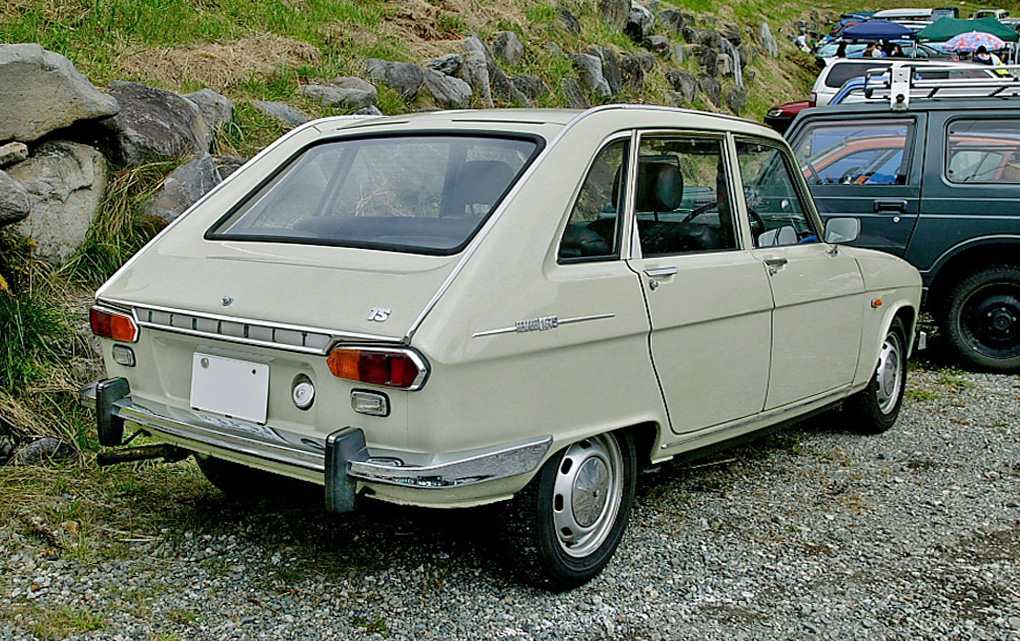
1968–1970 Renault 16 TS

The R16 was a great success, with 1,845,959 R16s manufactured during a production run of 15 years. The car sold well in most of Europe, winning praise for its spacious and comfortable interior as well as the practicality offered by its effectively unique hatchback bodystyle. It was marketed in the United States, with only a small number sold. It met with considerably more success in Canada, where SOMA-Renault manufactured the 16 from knock-down kits until 1974.

== Design ==
The mechanical layout of the R16 is front-wheel drive, engine mounted inline behind the transmission, torsion bar suspension, and column mounted shift. In addition the car had an aluminium engine and an electric cooling fan.

The 16 successfully introduced the hatchback bodystyle to the mid-size family segment, allowing the interior to be configured in seven different ways. This body style is between a saloon and an estate, and, before the term hatchback was coined, journalists struggled to describe it. A review in the English Motoring Illustrated in May 1965 (several months before the car was officially launched there) stated: "The Renault Sixteen can thus be described as a large family car but one that is neither a four door saloon and nor is it quite an estate. But, importantly, it is a little different."

The R16 is likewise noted for its unequal wheelbase, left to right, as with the earlier Renault 4 and later Renault 5. The two rear wheel axle shafts are not in-line; rather the left wheelbase is 70 mm (2.76 in) longer than the right wheelbase, to accommodate the transverse torsion bar suspension. This and the soft front seats gives the car a particularly smooth ride even over big bumps.

The engine was mounted longitudinally in the front, behind the gearbox/transaxle, contributing to the handling balance by keeping the weight closer to the centre of the car. Front drive layouts typically have transversely (sometimes longitudinally) mounted engines, with the engine in front of the transmission. While the R16's north-south/forward gearbox layout gave excellent handling, servicing access to the engine was so difficult that its successor, the Renault 20, kept the north-south layout but placed the engine ahead of the gearbox.

A column-mounted gear change lever allowed a more spacious front cabin. The column-mounted gear change (required by the position of the transmission in front of the engine) was rare in West European markets.

== Model history ==
Series production started in March 1965 at the company's recently completed Sandouville plant, a few kilometers to the east of Le Havre. The car had its formal launch in March 1965 at the Geneva Motor Show, and was made available for sale in France and most other left-hand drive markets during June 1965. Late that year, it was first imported to the UK market in right-hand drive form, and would quickly establish itself as one of Britain's most popular imported cars. It arrived on the UK market at a time when imported models still only accounted for a small percentage of new car sales, but was one of a string of cars from foreign brands which helped foreign cars increase their market share during the 1970s; other notable examples being the Fiat 127 and MK1 Volkswagen Golf. Renault's later R5 and R12 models also sold well in Britain during the 1970s.

For 1967, Renault introduced a lower-equipped model better suited for cargo, marketed as the 16 Commerciale until about 1976.

Equipment levels were high for the price. Initially, Renault sold the R16 with just a 1.5-litre (1470 cc) gasoline engine in GL specification for which 55 PS (40 kW; 54 hp) was claimed; in March 1968 there appeared at the Geneva Motor Show the 1.6-litre (1565 cc) 84 PS (62 kW; 83 hp) TS which could top 100 mph (160 km/h). An automatic transmission version, originally designated the Renault 16 TA, was introduced at the Geneva Motor Show early in 1969. The top-line model was the TX, launched at the Paris Motor Show in October 1973, featuring a 5-speed manual transmission along with power front windows and central door locking, one of the first family cars in Europe to include these.

Sales of the TX were less than stellar, as with the entire 16 lineup, due to the effects of the 1973 oil crisis. The TX Automatique's introduction was delayed in order to lower its fuel consumption to the level of that of the manual model. In October 1974 the chrome grille was replaced with a black plastic grille, except for on the 16 TX. This change did not apply in Sweden where a version of the chrome grille that incorporated headlight wipers, as required there since 1974, kept being used until 1980. In 1975 the automatics were discontinued, while the regular engine was switched to a 66 PS (49 kW) version of the TX's 1647 cc unit. The 16 L's power decreased to 55 PS (40 kW), and could now be run on the lowest-octane fuel. In 1976 the L was replaced by a version of the TL with the same 55 PS engine. The TS was discontinued in 1976.

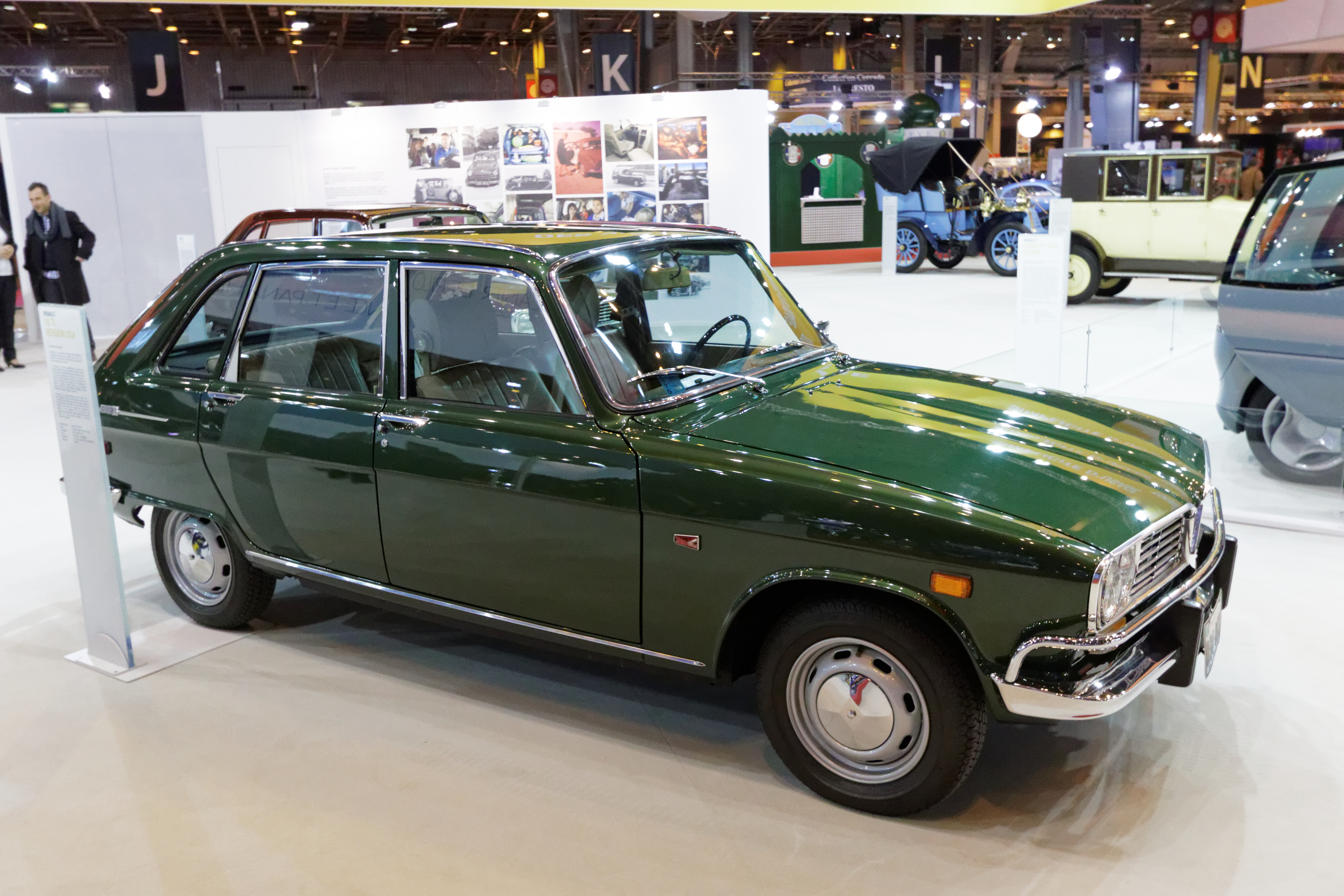
1972 US-market Renault 16 Sedan-Wagon

The American-market model arrived in late 1968 for the 1969 model year and was marketed as the Renault 16 Sedan-Wagon. The single headlights were replaced by twin sealed beam units, while slightly altered bumpers increased the overall length to 4,270 mm (168 in). Its 851-02 engine combined the head of the 1470 cc base engine with the block of the 1565 cc unit and had a maximum output of 62 PS (46 kW; 61 hp) DIN (70 PS SAE) at 5200 rpm. Sales continued into 1972 but only in very small numbers. The R16 had already been imported to Canada, and was then assembled there in the Renault-SOMA plant in Saint-Bruno-de-Montarville until 1974. A variety of different side marker lights and also some different taillights were installed on these cars.

Production of the R16 continued until 1980, five years after the arrival of its official successor, the larger Renault 20, with the Renault 18 saloon and estates continuing as Renault's only offering of this size in Europe. By the time the R16 ceased production most other European manufacturers had at least one hatchback on sale, although most cars of the R16's size were still sold as saloons or estates; the exceptions were the Austin Maxi, Talbot Alpine (previously sold as a Chrysler or Simca) and Volkswagen Passat. Renault did not build a hatchback of this size again until the hatchback version of the Renault 21 was launched in 1989.

The 16 had no direct competitors until the arrival of the Alec Issigonis designed Austin Maxi in 1969, but the Austin Maxi was not a strong seller outside of the UK.

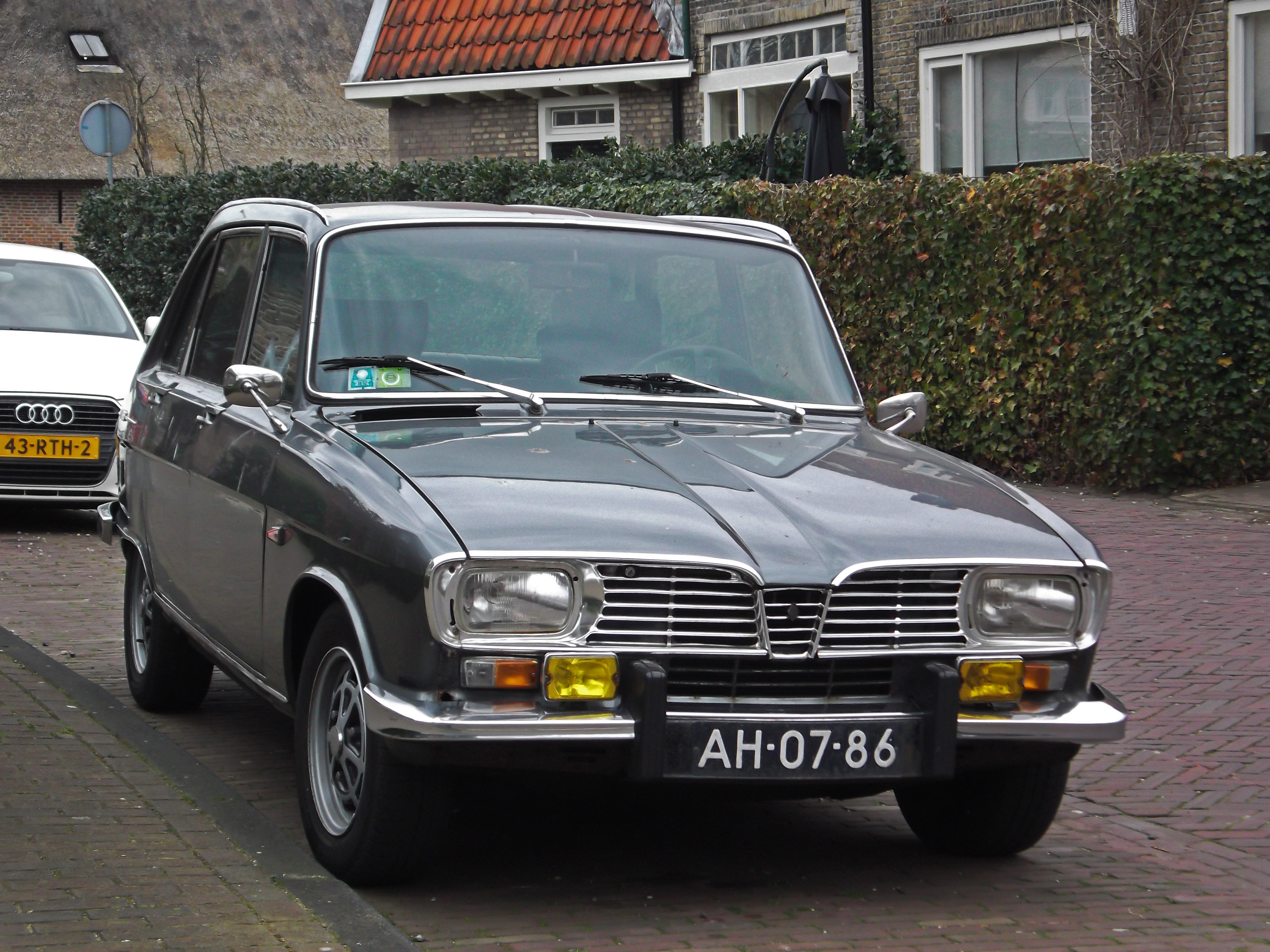
Renault 16 (1970–1974)

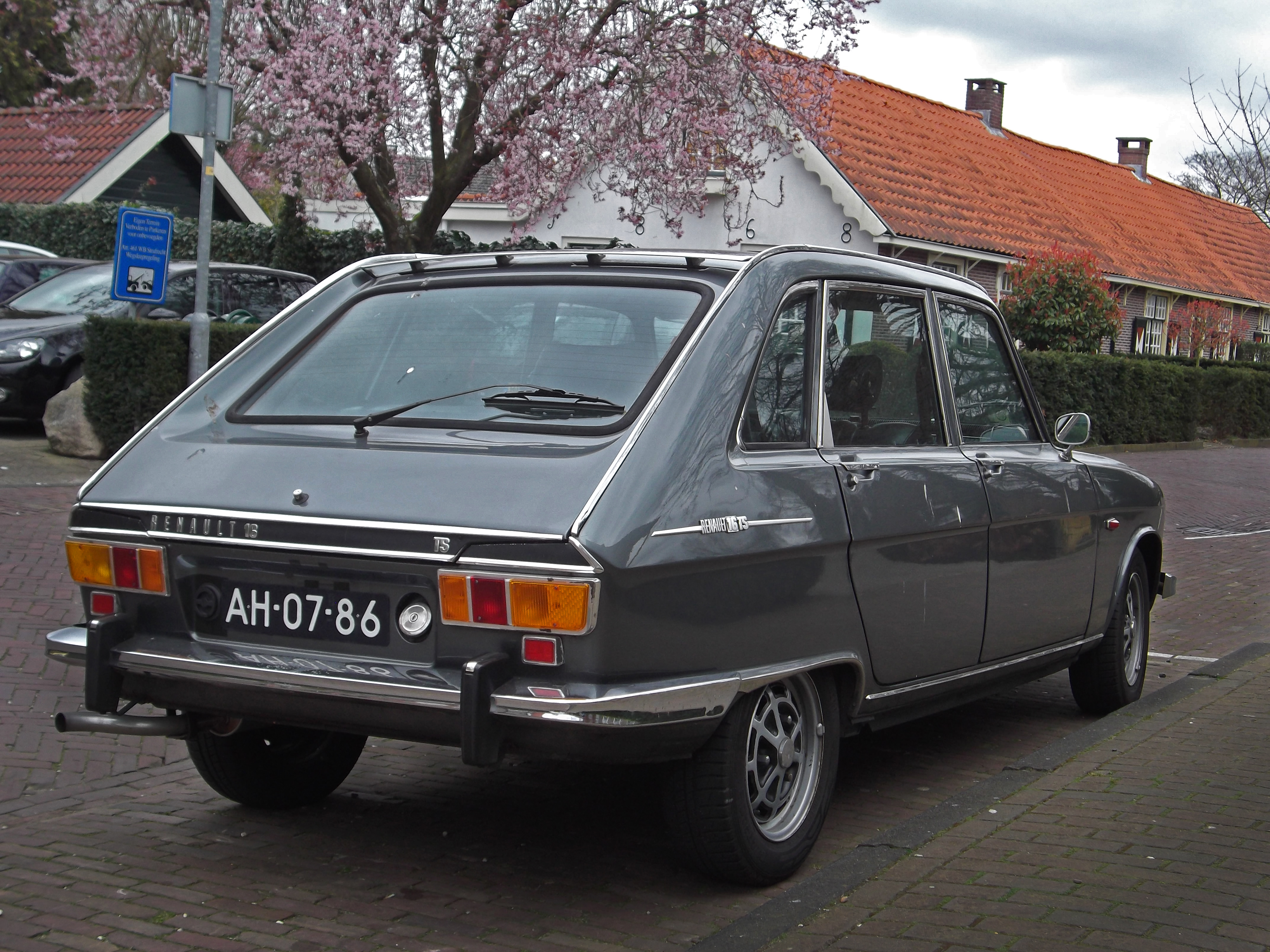
Renault 16 (1970–1974)

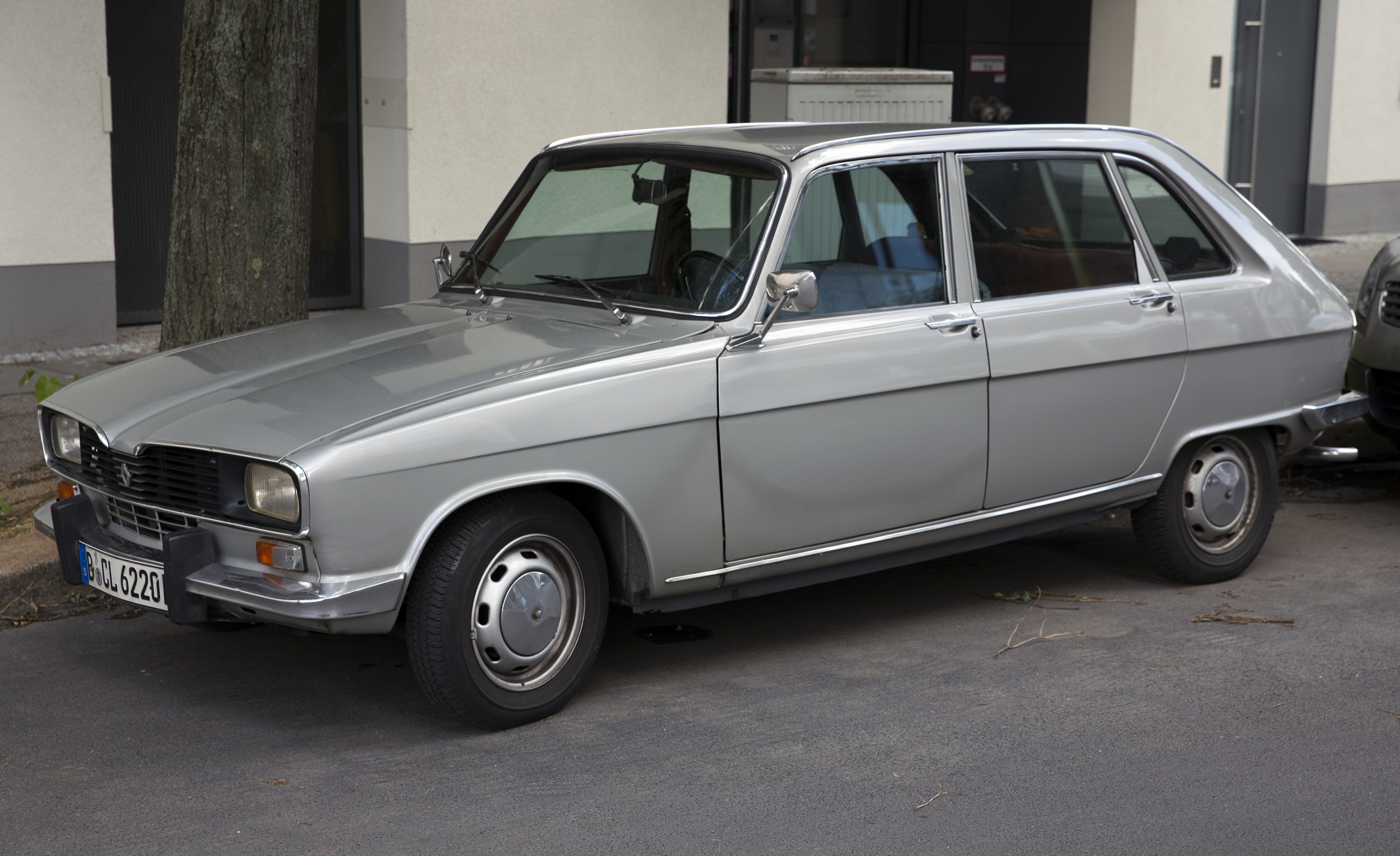
Post-1975 Renault 16 TL, featuring the black plastic grille

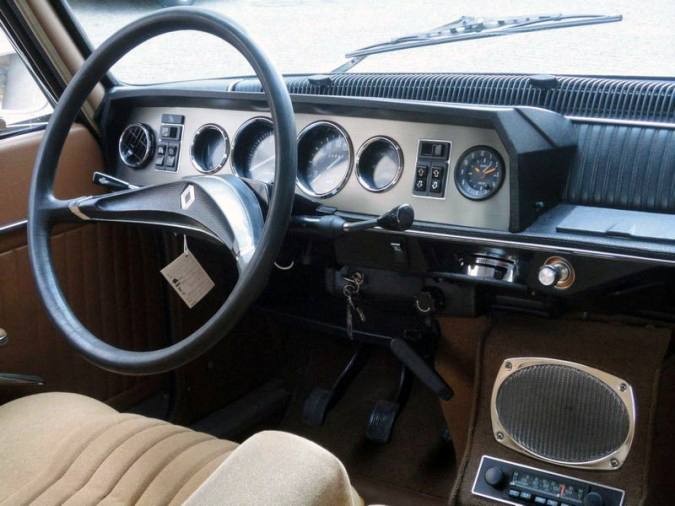
1975 Renault 16 TS interior

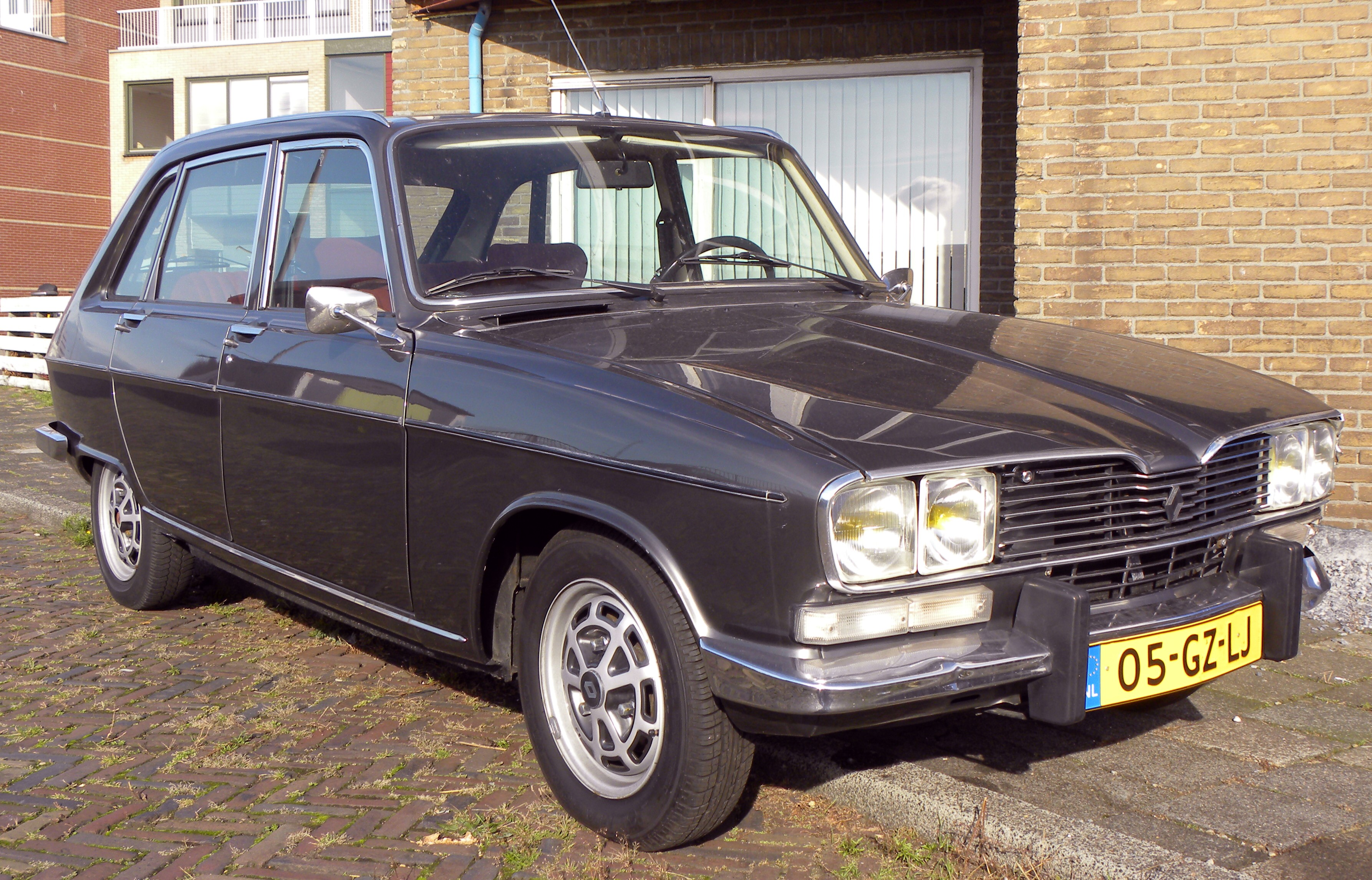
Renault 16 TX with twin headlights

== Concepts and prototypes ==
=== Renault 16 sedan concept ===
In 1965, Philippe Charbonneaux proposed a more traditional saloon body but the project never went past prototype stage. One surviving prototype is permanently on display at the Musée Automobile Reims Champagn in Reims, France.

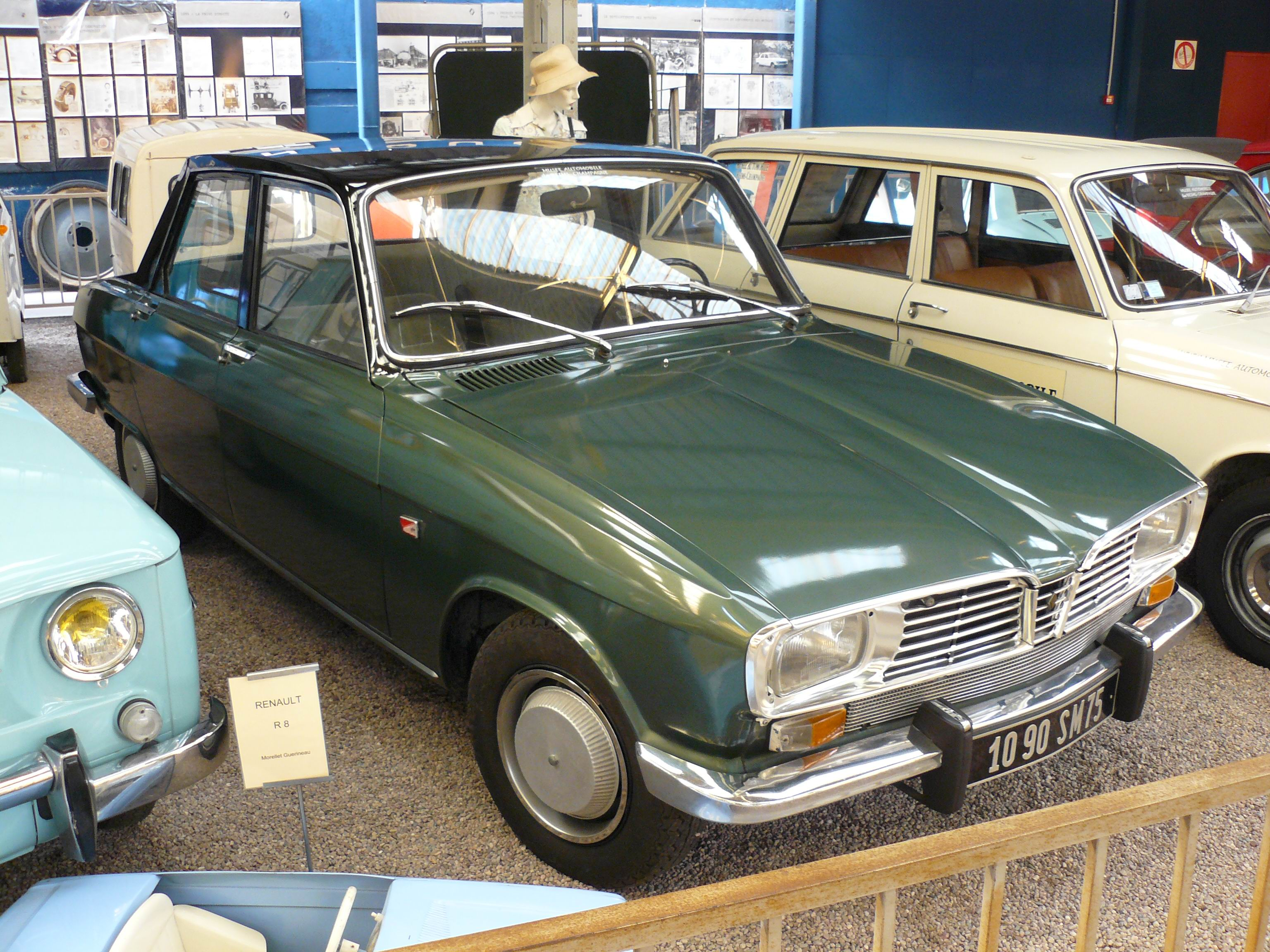
1965 Renault 16 sedan concept

=== Renault 16 coupé cabriolet ===
A coupé cabriolet version was in development, but due to most of the body parts being unique to those used on the saloon, production would have been too costly and the project was shelved.

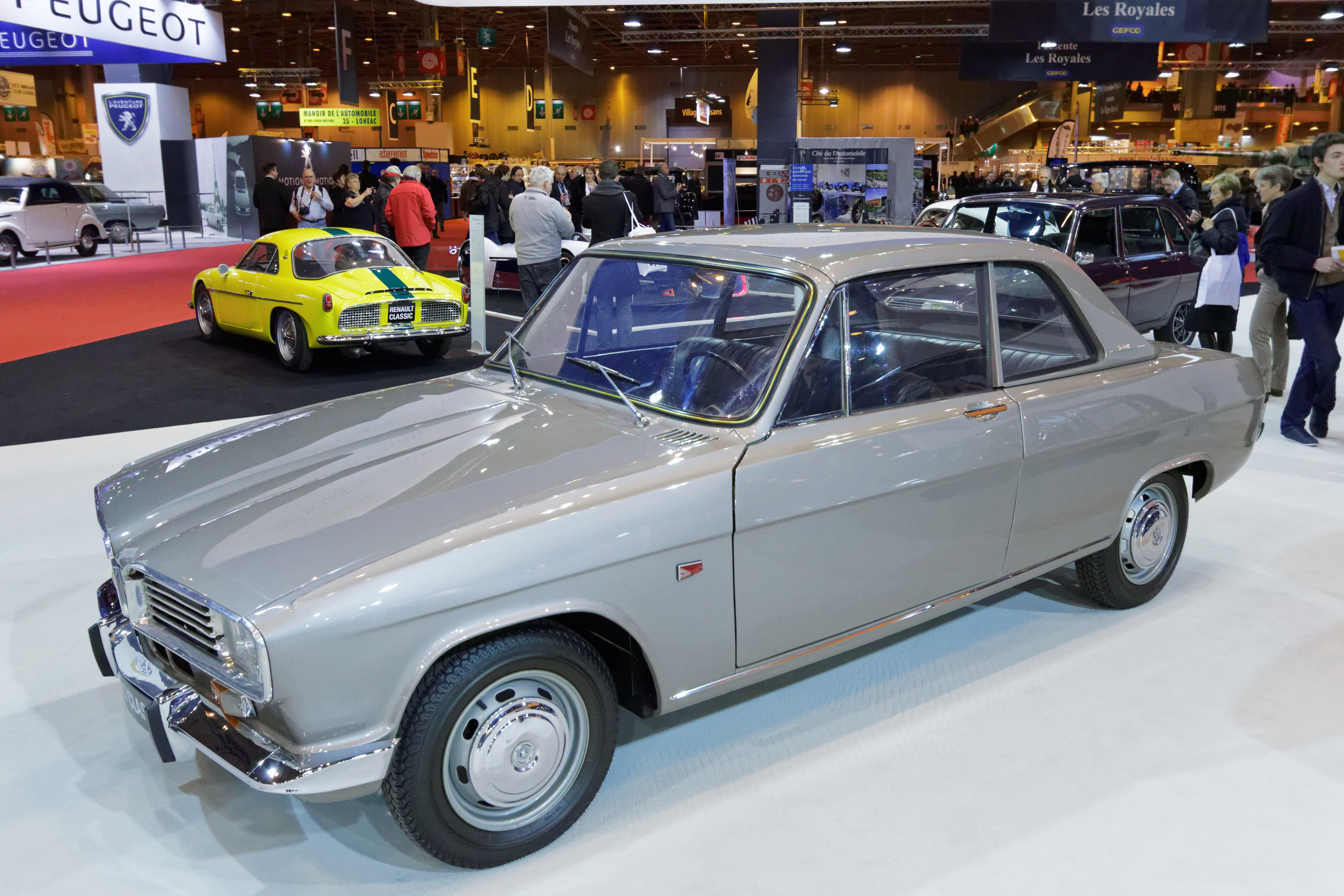
Renault 16 Coupé Cabriolet prototype

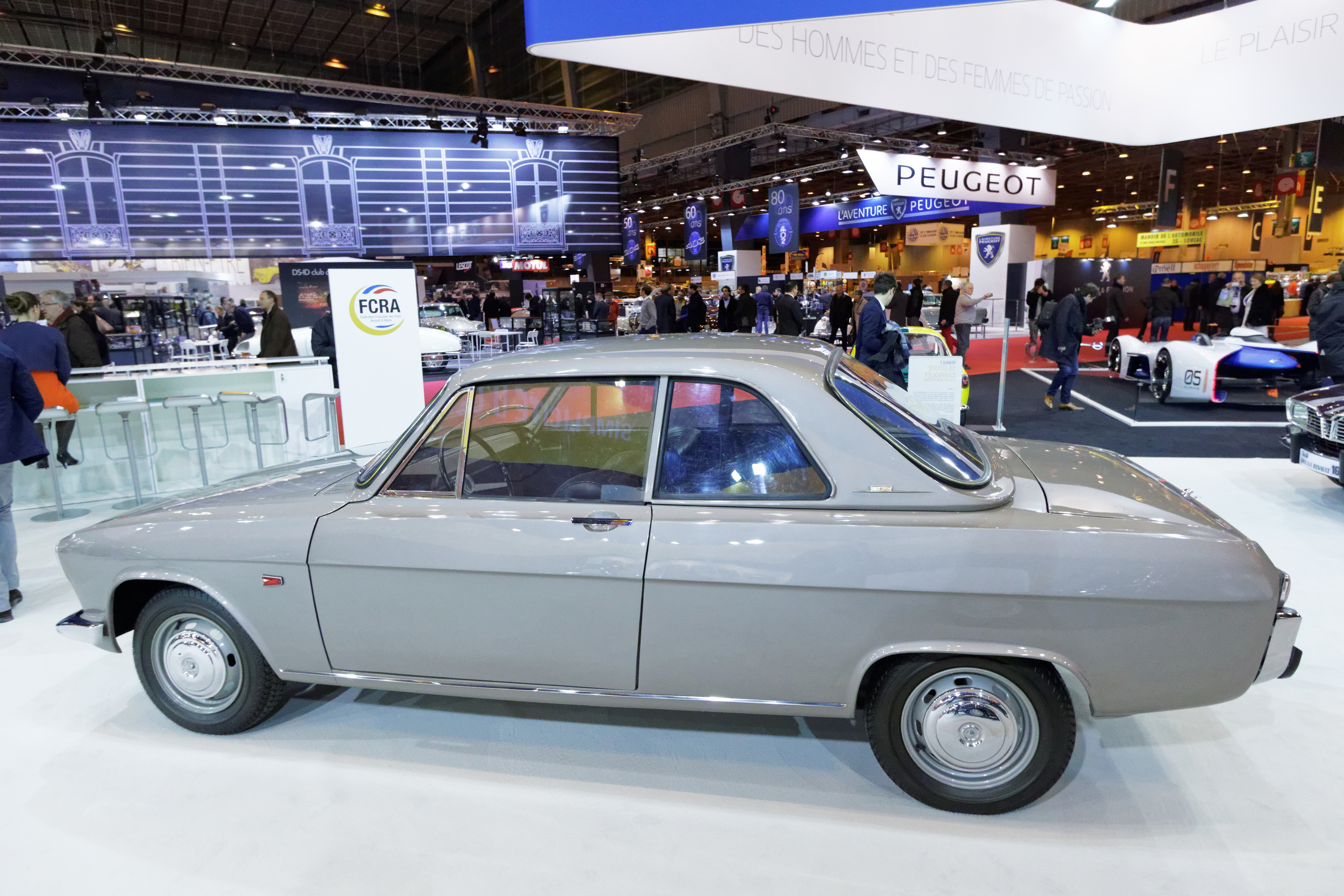
Renault 16 Coupé Cabriolet prototype

== Commentary ==
In 1970, racing driver Stirling Moss exclaimed: "There is no doubt that the Renault 16 is the most intelligently engineered automobile I have ever encountered and I think that each British motorcar manufacturer would do well to purchase one just to see how it is put together".

Pre-launch publicity was extensive, with semi-authorized media leaks. L'Auto-Journal reported details of the car, at this stage in an exclusive report, towards the end of 1963. During October 1964, timed to coincide with the Paris Motor Show, Renault distributed photographs of its innovative new family car, still at this stage described simply as the forthcoming "Renault 1500", for publication as "scoop" pictures in various magazines. It was only two months later that the car, now officially named a "Renault 16", was approved for sale by the French homologation authorities.

== Awards ==
The Renault 16 was voted European Car of the Year by a board of European motoring journalists late in 1965. It was the third winner of the award, and the Renault 16 was the first French winner - the first two winners had been British.

== Timeline ==
- August 1964 – First official pictures of the R16 are released to the media.
- December 2, 1964 – The first R16 is completed at the factory in Sandouville, near Le Havre, a facility purpose-built for the R16.
- January 5, 1965 – The Renault 16 is introduced to the world and the press in a presentation on the Côte-d'Azur.
- April 1965 – The R16 is made available to the public, in two specifications: Grand Luxe and Super, both powered by a 1470 cc engine
- Autumn 1965 – The R16 is launched in right-hand drive form for the UK market.
- 1967 – Ventilation and heating are both improved and the dashboard is redesigned. An automatically operated choke is also made available.
- 1968 – The R16 TS is introduced. It features a new 1565 cc engine, an all-new instrument panel that includes a tachometer and water temperature gauge and many other new features including two-speed windscreen wipers, rear defroster, passenger reading light and optional manual steel sunroof and powered front windows.
- June 1968 – Australian assembly commences
- 1969 – The other R16 models get the same wheels and brakes as the TS. The TS gets reversing lights (mounted beneath the taillights). The other models are available with reversing lights as an optional extra.
- 1969 – The R16 TA, with an automatic transmission, is introduced. The TA is effectively a R16 Super with some features from the TS.
- 1970 – Front seatbelts are installed on all R16s.
- 1971 – The R16 undergoes a mild revamp. Among the most obvious changes are new rectangular taillights. The Grand Luxe and Super are replaced by the L and TL specifications, both of which gain the same 1565 cc engine as the TS (but with the cylinder head from the 1470 cc). The TA is discontinued and an automatic transmission is made available as an option across the whole R16 range.
- 1973 – An upmarket R16 TX model is introduced at the Paris Motor Show, equipped with a 1647 cc engine (an enlarged version of the TS engine) and a five-speed manual transmission. The TX was distinguishable from other R16s on the exterior by its four rectangular headlights with large turn signal lights underneath. Among the other features available on the TX were Gordini wheels, a rear spoiler, a rear windscreen wiper, a laminated windscreen, automatic seatbelts, power windows, central locking and optional air conditioning.
- 1974 – The aluminium grille on L, TL and TS is replaced by a black plastic grille.
- 1975 – Launch of the R20 and R30 models which are expected to replace the R16, but it continues alongside the newer cars for the time being.
- 1976 – The automatic transmission ceased to be available as an option on the L, TL and TS. However, a TL Automatic model was launched.
- 1977 – The L and TS models are discontinued as Renault unveils the new R18 saloon, another car expected to appeal to current R16 owners.
- 1978 – All models now have reversing lights fitted as standard.
- 1979 – Rear three-point seatbelts are made standard on all models. The TL Automatic is discontinued.
- January 1980 – R16 production ends after 15 years.
