= Corail (train) =

Class of French passenger rail cars

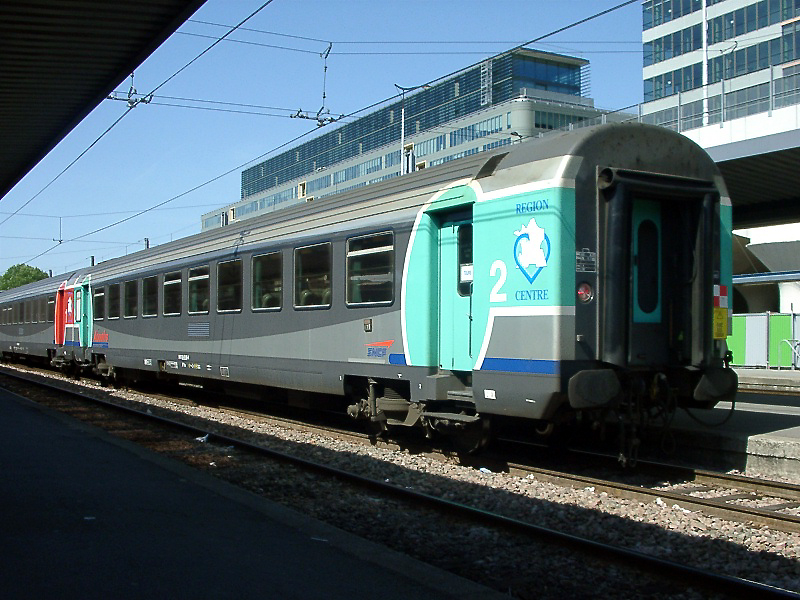
- Corail coach (2003)
- In service: 1975–present
- Manufacturer: Societe Franco Belge
- Built at: Raismes
- Constructed: 1975–1989
- Refurbished: 1995 (Corail+), 2000 (Teoz),2010 (TER)
- Number built: 3892 cars
- Capacity: 2nd class : 80 or 88; 2nd class compartments: 88; 1st class : 58; 1st class compartments: 54 or 60 buffet car: 44 other configurations exist
- Operator: SNCF

Specifications
- Car length: 26.4 m (86 ft 7 in)
- Width: 2.825 m (9 ft 3.2 in)
- Maximum speed: 160 km/h (99 mph) or 200 km/h (124 mph) (according to type)
- Weight: 42 tonnes (41 long tons; 46 short tons)
- Bogies: Type Y 32 A

Corail is the name given to a class of passenger rail cars of the SNCF that first entered commercial service in 1975. When introduced, the Corail carriages had improved passenger comfort, featured air-conditioning, and better levels of suspension and sound-proofing compared with previous InterCity carriages.

== History and design ==
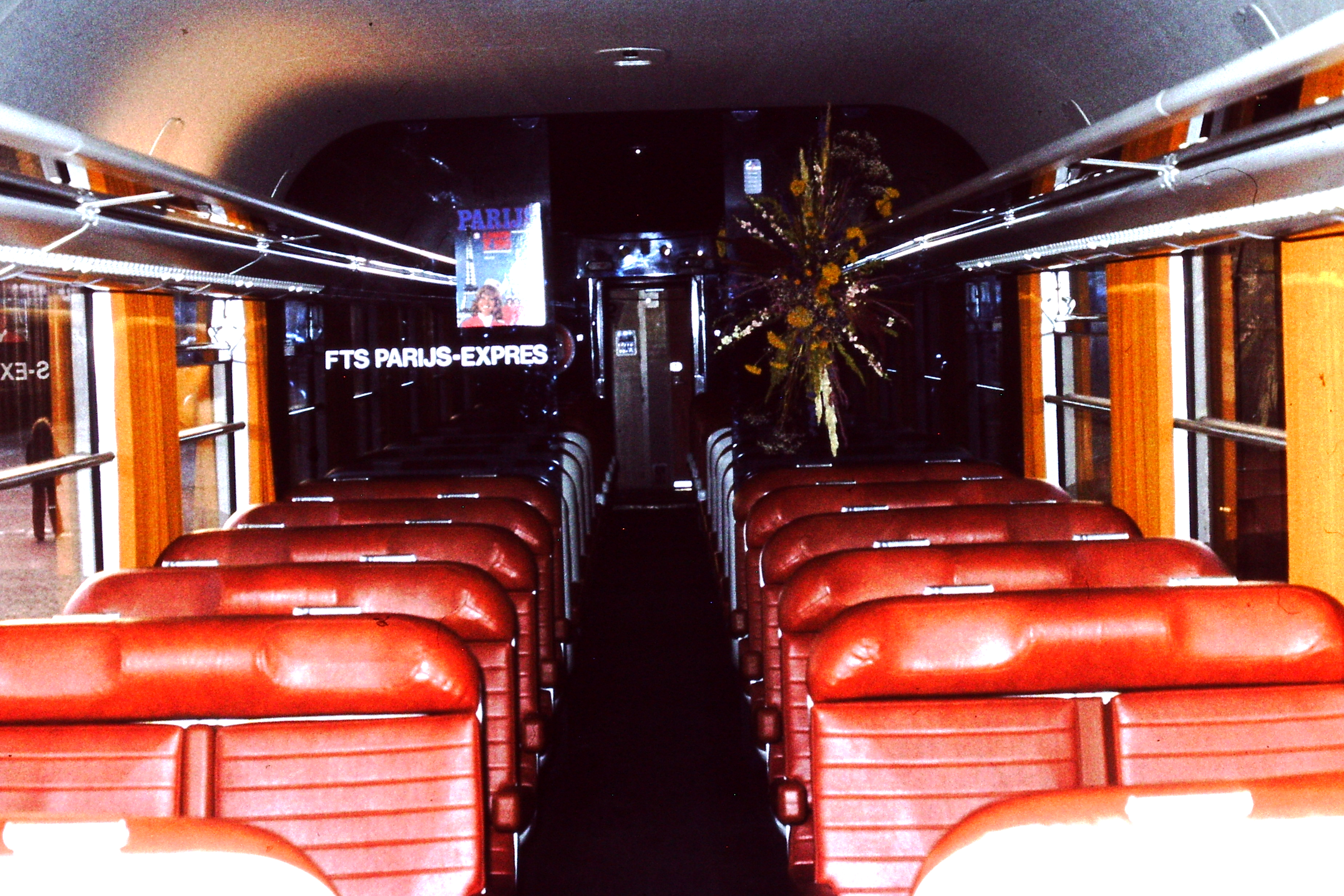
Interior of second class Corail coach, about 1976

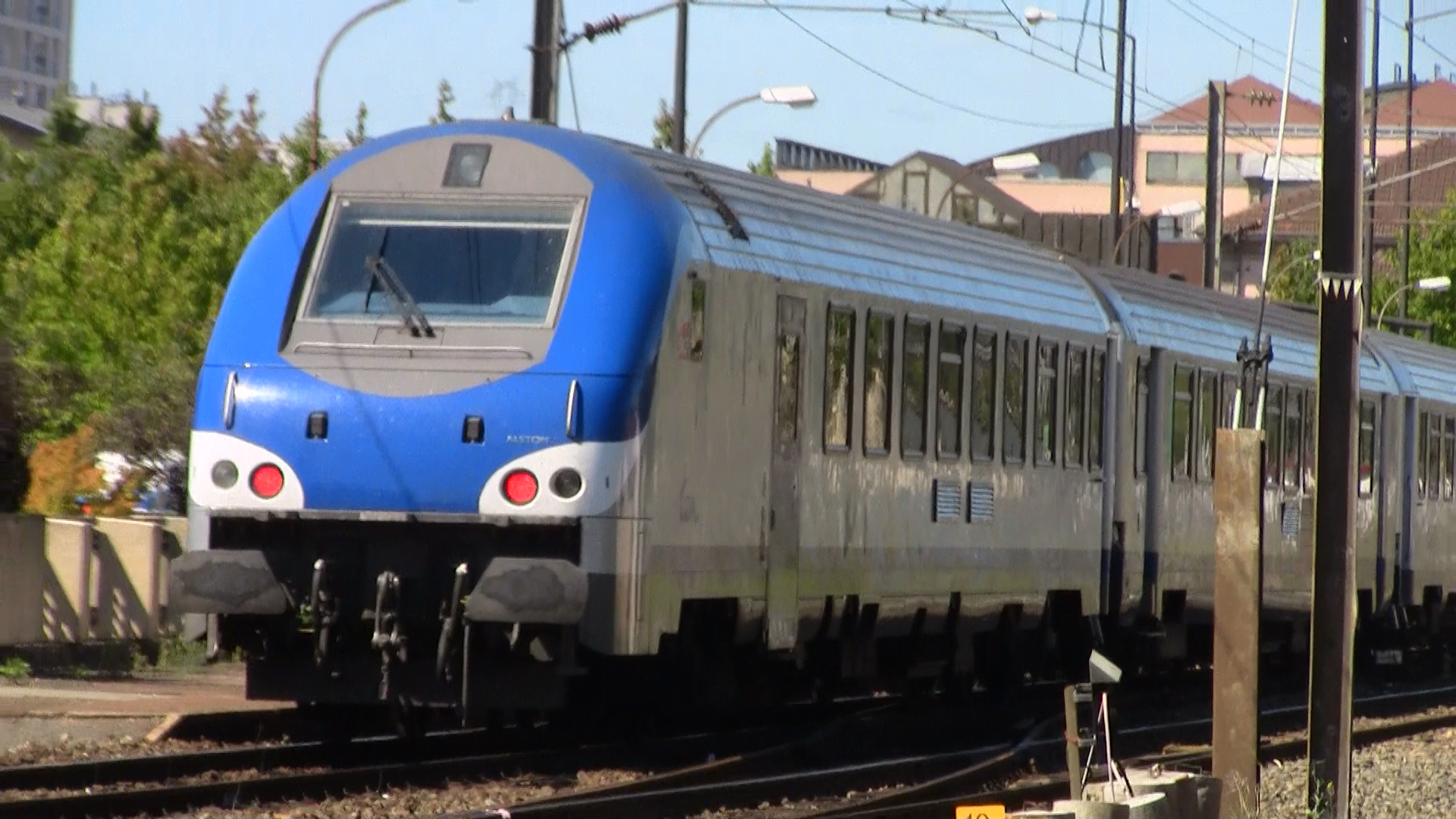
Corail B5uxh control car

The acquisition of the Corail coaches was a huge investment for SNCF with nearly 4000 carriages ordered, and represented a major leap in quality of service for French rail passengers. The name Corail, which is also used as a designation of service for trains made up of these carriages, derives from combination of 'comfort' and 'rail'. Additionally, 'corail' means 'coral' in French, giving a play-on-words and making it memorable.

The carriages were designed by the French industrial designer Roger Tallon and built by the Société Franco-Belge in Raismes, northern France, and by Alstom's La Rochelle factory in Aytré.

When introduced, Corail carriages were painted in two tones of grey with a sharp flash of orange on the doors. Corail carriages were used throughout France on non-TGV locomotive-hauled services.

Their use was reduced with the development and introduction of the TGV. As the TGV network has expanded, Corail trains were cascaded down onto regional services.

The SNCF responded by beginning to modernise the fleet in 1996. A new livery and refurbished interior was introduced as part of the "Corail Plus" programme. The orange doors become green for second class and red for first. These refurbishments of mainline Corail trains were soon considered to be insufficient, and in 2003 three heavily refurbished and re-fitted cars were revealed in Paris as the new Téoz, featuring multicoloured exterior colour schemes and heavily modernised interiors; refurbished and upgraded Téoz trains were deployed on trunk routes where no TGV services operate.

By 2005, Buffet coaches and "Bar Corail" no longer operated on all services, however a mobile catering service using trolleys is offered on some Téoz services. On night services, a vending machine is located in the so-called "voiture service".

Lunéa night trains operate on a number of domestic routes, offering a first and second class couchette service. Passengers travel in compartments of four or six bunks, and are provided with a pillow, lightweight bedsheet and blanket. Most Lunéa services also convey reclining seats cars.

Between 2004 and 2008 Alstom rebuilt some 2nd class cars with baggage compartments into new B5uxh cab-cars. Most of the vehicles were still in service in 2008.

Surplus carriages were sold to regional councils to be used for TER regional services. Certain regions use Corail coaches rated for 200 km/h (124 mph) operation (the rest are limited to 160 km/h (99 mph)) to operate fast regional services known as TER 200.

== See also ==
- Aqualys
- Sorefame (manufacturer of stainless steel bodied versions of Corail carriages, under licence, for Portuguese Railways)
