= Roger Tallon =

French industrial designer

Roger Tallon (6 March 1929 – 20 October 2011) was a French industrial designer.

== Biography ==
After studying as an engineer (1944–1950), Tallon was employed by Caterpillar France and DuPont. In 1953, he joined Technès, the technical and aesthetic studies office founded in 1949 by the father of industrial aesthetics, Jacques Viénot and Jean Parthenay. Being rapidly promoted to technical and artistic director at the agency, he became the sole director after Viénot's death in 1959.

In 1957 he enrolled at the École des Arts Appliqués ("School of Applied Arts") in Paris, and put in place the first design course in the country. In 1963, he set up the Design Department of the École nationale supérieure des arts décoratifs in Paris.

As a consultant for the US company General Electric, Tallon designed refrigerators and washing machines and set up the Design Department of the American company.

In 1966, the Téléavia P111 portable television was put on the market against the advice of the Board. It broke the mould of TV design and was a great commercial success with a cult following.

In 1973, Tallon set up the agency Design Programmes. Brother-in-arms with the LIP watchmakers, he created the Mach 2000 brand of watches and chronometers. In 1974, with Jean-Charles de Castelbajac, he created a concept aircraft cabin for Air France.

After leaving Euro RSCG, he continued to work independently. Roger Tallon died on 20 October 2011 after a long period of sickness.

== Work ==
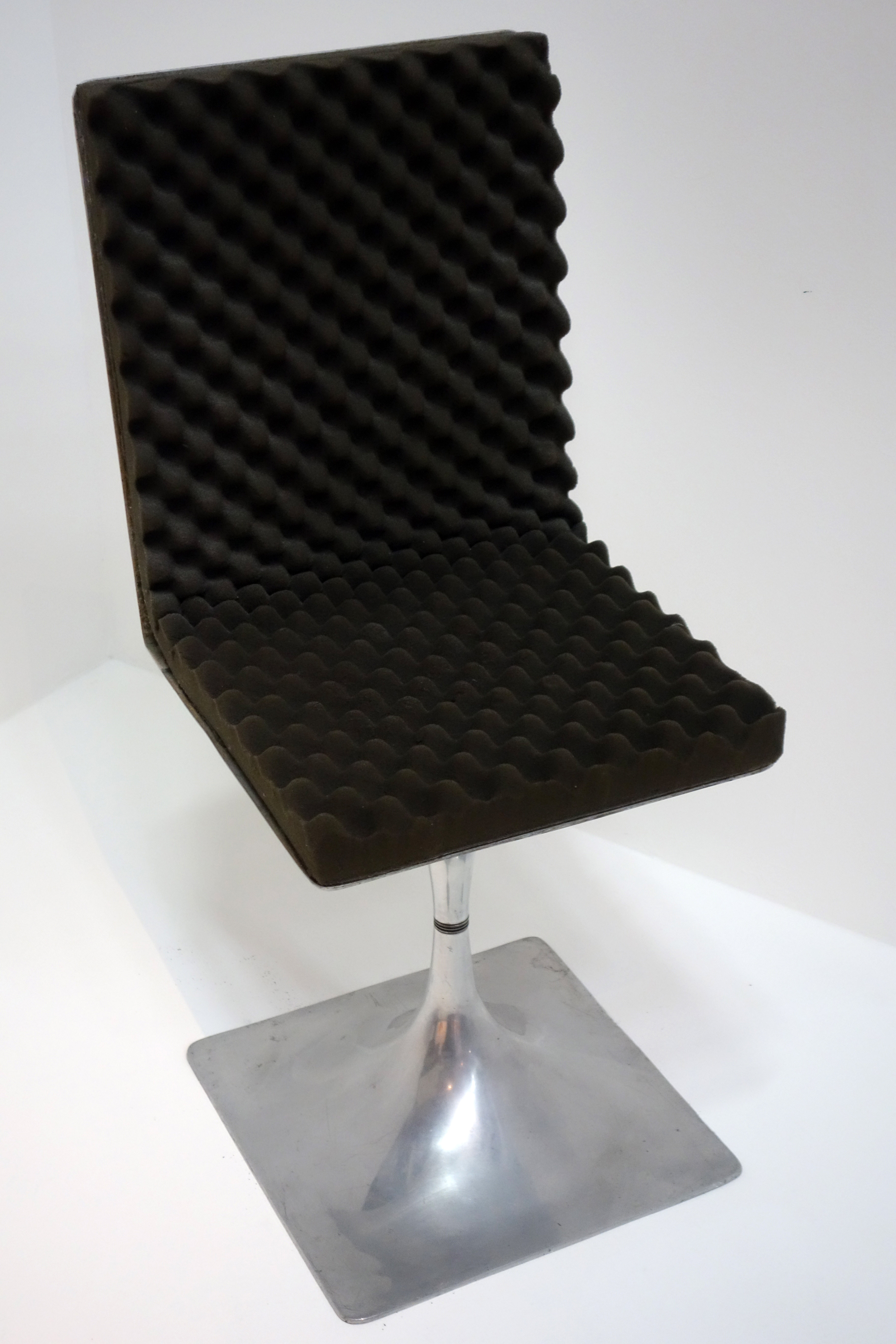
Chaise Echiquier, Roger Tallon - MNAM

Tallon and his team created hundreds of products, including industrial robots for Peugeot, the apparently purposeless 8mm film camera "Veronic", the Gallic 16 and 14 lathes for the Belgian company La Mondiale – a quantum leap in machine tooling – airport vehicles, forklifts for Fenwick, graphic images for Fenwick Aviation, and a slide projector for Kodak.

In the art world, Tallon worked with Yves Klein, César Baldaccini, Arman [sic], and was contacted by Catherine Millet, founder of the art press review, to create a brand that has hardly changed to this day.

Tallon became a household name in areas including tableware, furniture, interior design, reflector lamps for the German Erco, watches for Lip, ski boots for Salomon Group, toothbrushes for Fluocaril, oilcans for Elf, and so on.

=== Transportation ===
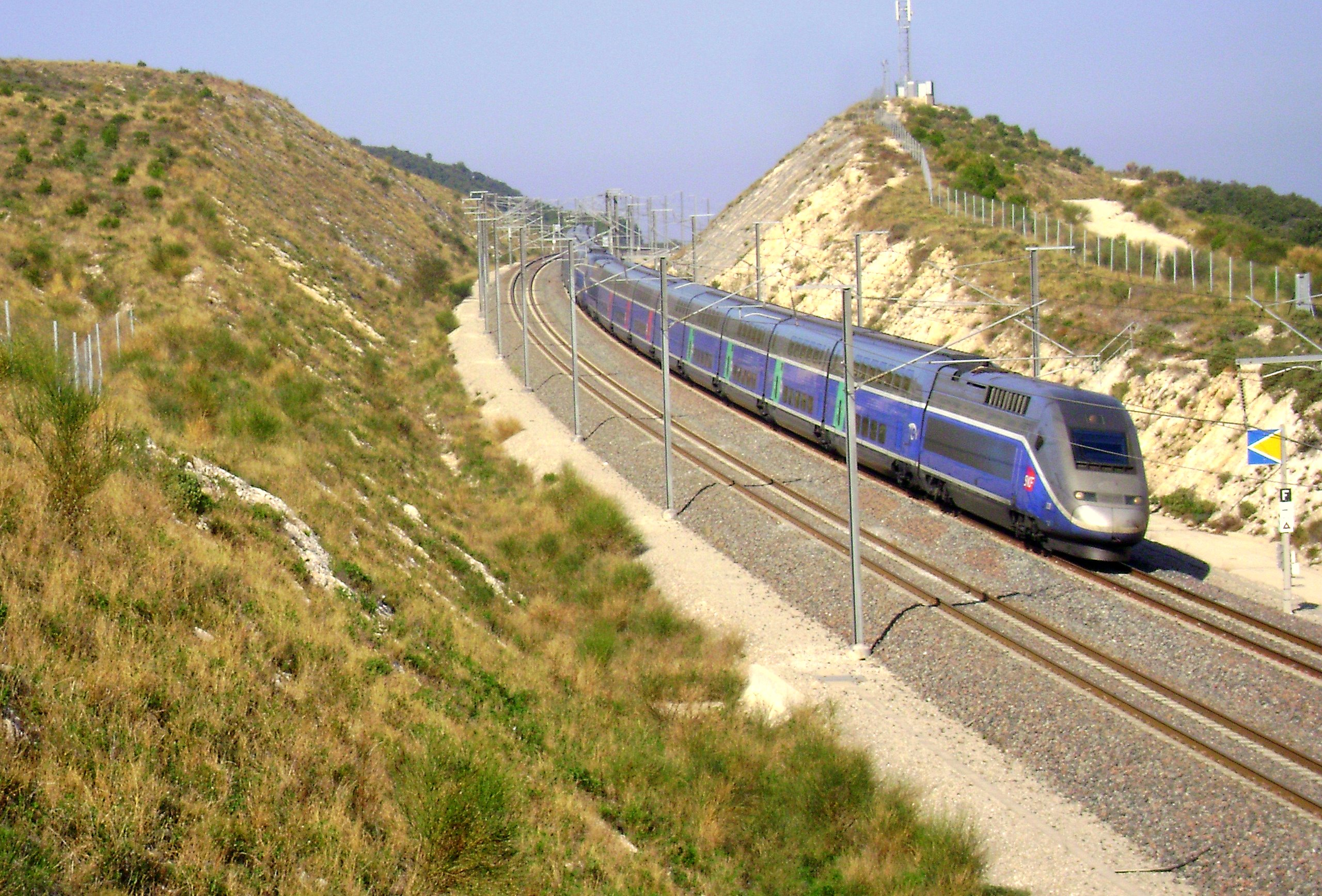
A TGV double-decker train on the LGV Méditerranée near Avignon

In the transport world, an early Tallon design was the Derny 'Taon' motorcycle and he later took on the Mexico City Metro and, for Alstom and the SNCF, the TGV and the locomotive for the Corail train. Ergonomics, colours, lighting – and everything down to the route maps found in each train. With the couturier Michel Schreiber, he designed new staff uniforms.

The TGV Atlantique project started in 1986, Eurostar in 1987. A new Montmartre funicular saw Tallon conquer the hill of Montmartre in 1991. In 1994, after several mergers, Tallon's company and ADSA became Euro RSCG Design. He has worked on Texan and Canadian high-speed trains, double-decker TGV trains for France, the Paris Métro project Météor, the VAL 208 for Matra, and the new branding for Finnish Railways.

== Awards ==
- 1985: Grand Prix National de la Création Industrielle from the Minister of Culture.
- 1992: Insignia of Commandeur des Arts et des Lettres from the President of the SNCF.
