= Automobile Museum Reims-Champagne =

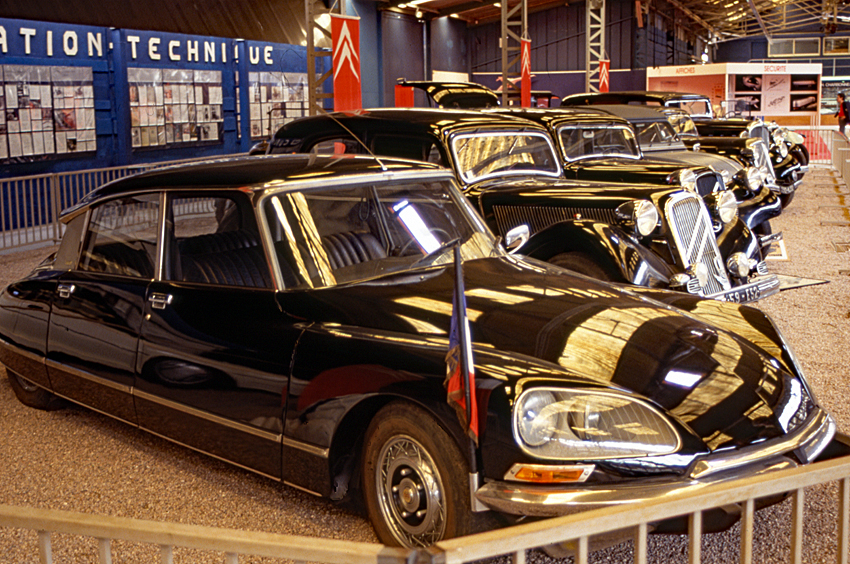
- 1962 Citroën DS23, President Giscard d`Estaing`s official car
- Established: 1985; 41 years ago
- Location: Reims, France
- Coordinates: 49°15′02″N 4°03′01″E,
- Type: Automobile museum
- Collection size: 250 vehicles (160 cars, 90 two-wheelers), 7000 miniatures, 80 pedal cars, 170 enamel plates.
- Founder: Philippe Charbonneaux
- President: Didier Carrayon
- Website: Official website

Musée Automobile Reims-Champagne, (Reims Automobile Museum), is a motor museum located in Reims. It was founded in 1985 to house the collection of Philippe Charbonneaux.

== Description ==
The museum was founded in 1985 to house the collection of Philippe Charbonneaux. The premises at 84 Avenue Georges Clémenceau, 51100 Reims, house the fifth largest vehicle collection in France, with 230 cars and motor bikes dating from 1908.

== The collection ==
=== Cars ===
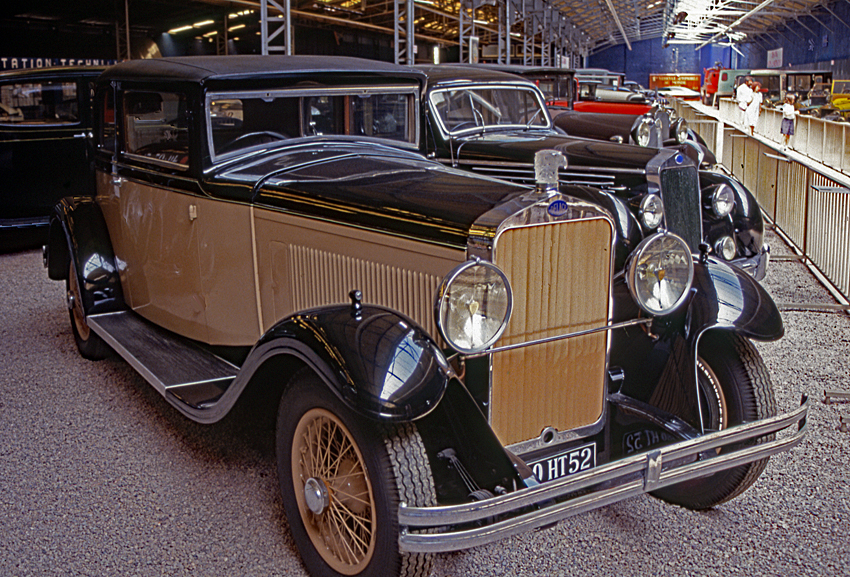
Delage D8c with Lalique mascot

The collection includes: Amilcar, Berliet, Chenard-Walcker, CIME, Citroën, DB, De Dion-Bouton, Delage, Delahaye, Panhard, Peugeot, Renault, Salmson, Simca and Talbot.

=== Motorcycles ===
The motorcycle collection includes: BSA, Condor, Gillet, Monet-Goyon, Motobécane, Norton, NSU, Soyer, Terrot, and Triumph.

=== Toys ===
Sections of the museum are devoted to toys and pedal-cars.

== Administration ==
The museum is currently managed by an association of collectors.
