= Jesuit College of Reims =

French historic monument

- Collège des Jésuites de Reims (French)
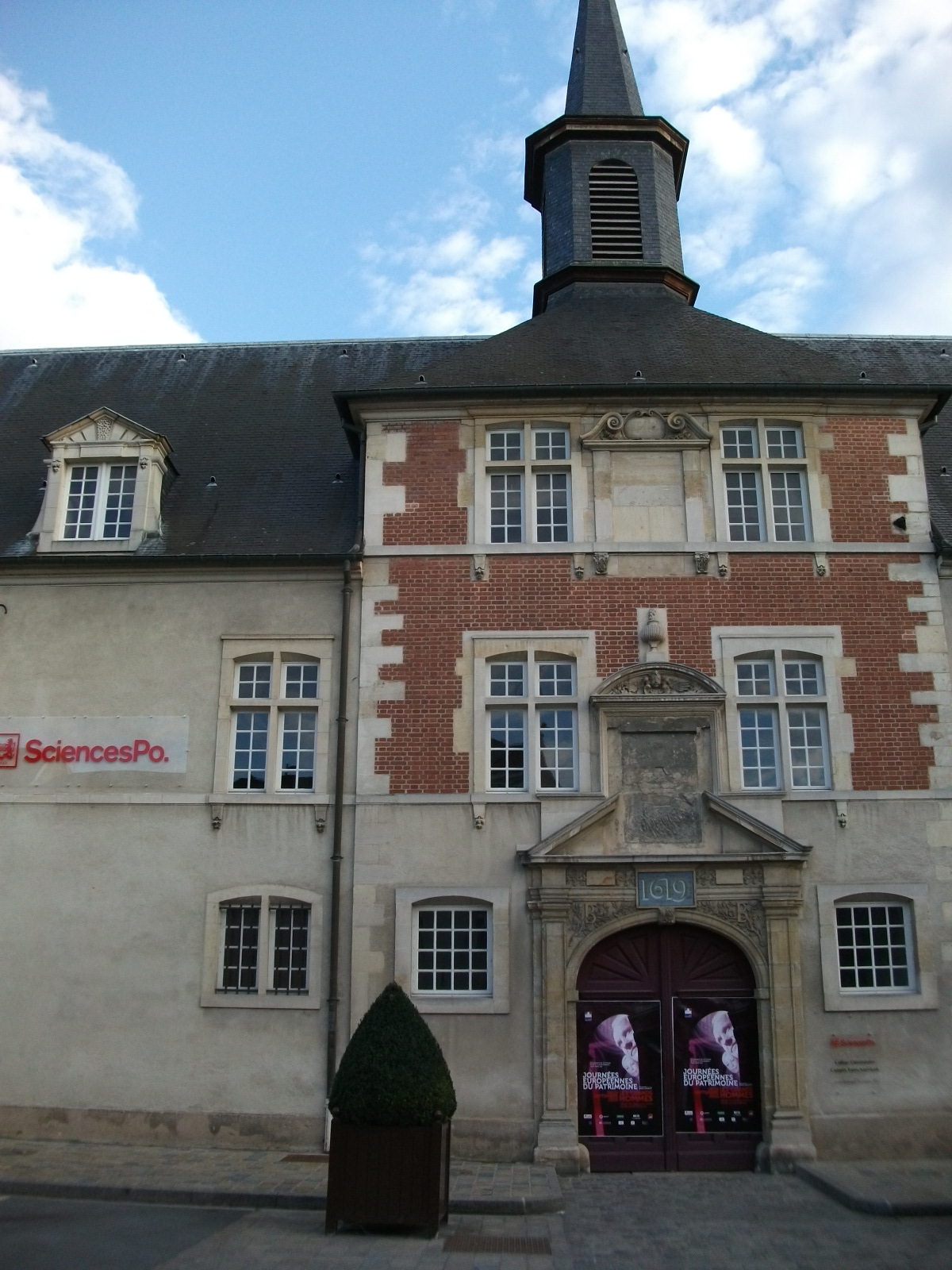
- Entrance from place Museux, Reims
- Interactive map of the Jesuit College of Reims area

General information
- Type: Museum, University
- Architectural style: French Baroque
- Classification: Monument historique (1921, 1933)
- Location: Reims, France, 1 place Museux
- Coordinates: 49.246563°N 4.040409°E
- Current tenants: Sciences Po
- Estimated completion: 1608
- Owner: City of Reims

Design and construction
- Architect: Narcisse Brunette

The former Jesuit College of Reims is a 16th-century building located in Reims in the Marne, a French department in the Champagne area of the Grand Est region. Founded in 1608 by Jesuits, the college was closed in 1762 when the Jesuits were banished from France. The buildings were used for other educational projects during the 19th century. Since 1976 they have belonged to the City of Reims, which has used it to provide a space for various regional and international organisations. Its library and refectory are recognised monuments of Baroque art.

== History ==
=== Buildings ===
Nicolas Brûlart de Sillery asked Henri IV for permission for the Jesuits to open a college in Reims. The king authorised, by letters patent of 25 March 1606, the Jesuit fathers to found a college in Reims. His brother François (†. 1630), who was chaplain to the king, bought the Hôtel de Cerny on 12 March 1608 for them to set up there. He donated 3 000 pounds for the fitting out of the establishment.

On 18 October 1608 the Jesuits inaugurated their classes there. They taught Humanities, Philosophy and Mathematics.

In 1610 François Brûlart donated a farm and a priory for the maintenance of a chair of philosophy, then in 1614 an annuity of 1,000 pounds for the opening of a second chair of Philosophy.

In 1615 the Jesuits bought the neighbouring priory of Saint-Maurice to extend the premises and in 1619, François Brûlart made a further donation of 6 600 pounds, which enabled it to be given its present layout: a central chapel with a courtyard surrounded by buildings. The teaching was then completed by theological instruction.

In May 1762, when they were banished from France, the Jesuits' property was seized and the College of Reims was reunited with the Collège des Bons Enfants. In January 1766, the General Hospital took possession of the buildings, which served as a hospice until 1772. The Magneuses, a foundation created by Nicolas Colbert's widow, moved into part of the college in 1791 to take in poor girls aged between 10 and 15 and give them an education. They occupied the college until the middle of the 20th century before it was used to house law students in 1967. The buildings were acquired by the municipality in 1976, and major works were undertaken from 2013 to 2015 to adapt the premises to current teaching.

=== Conservation ===
Restored, the building was converted into the multi-activity centre it is today. To protect the architectural and cultural interest of this complex, including its garden, courtyard, refectory, hallway, kitchen, elevations, and interior decoration; the vines that escaped phylloxera are classified as an ancient grape variety, the Verjus; all are under legal protection: this complex has been classified as a historic monument since 2 September 1933, while the 17th century staircase has been classified since 25 December 1921.

== Gallery ==
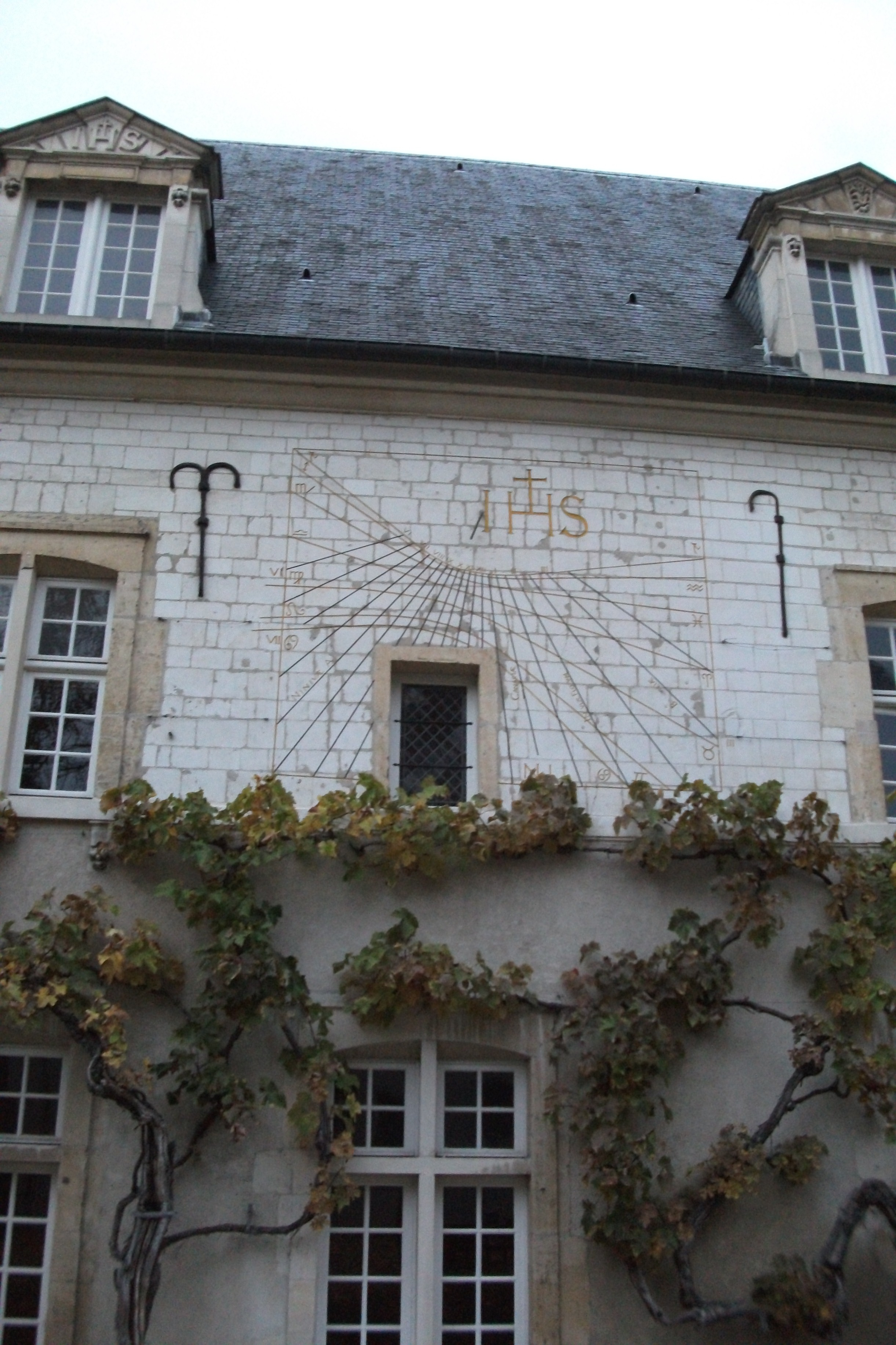
Sundial and vines

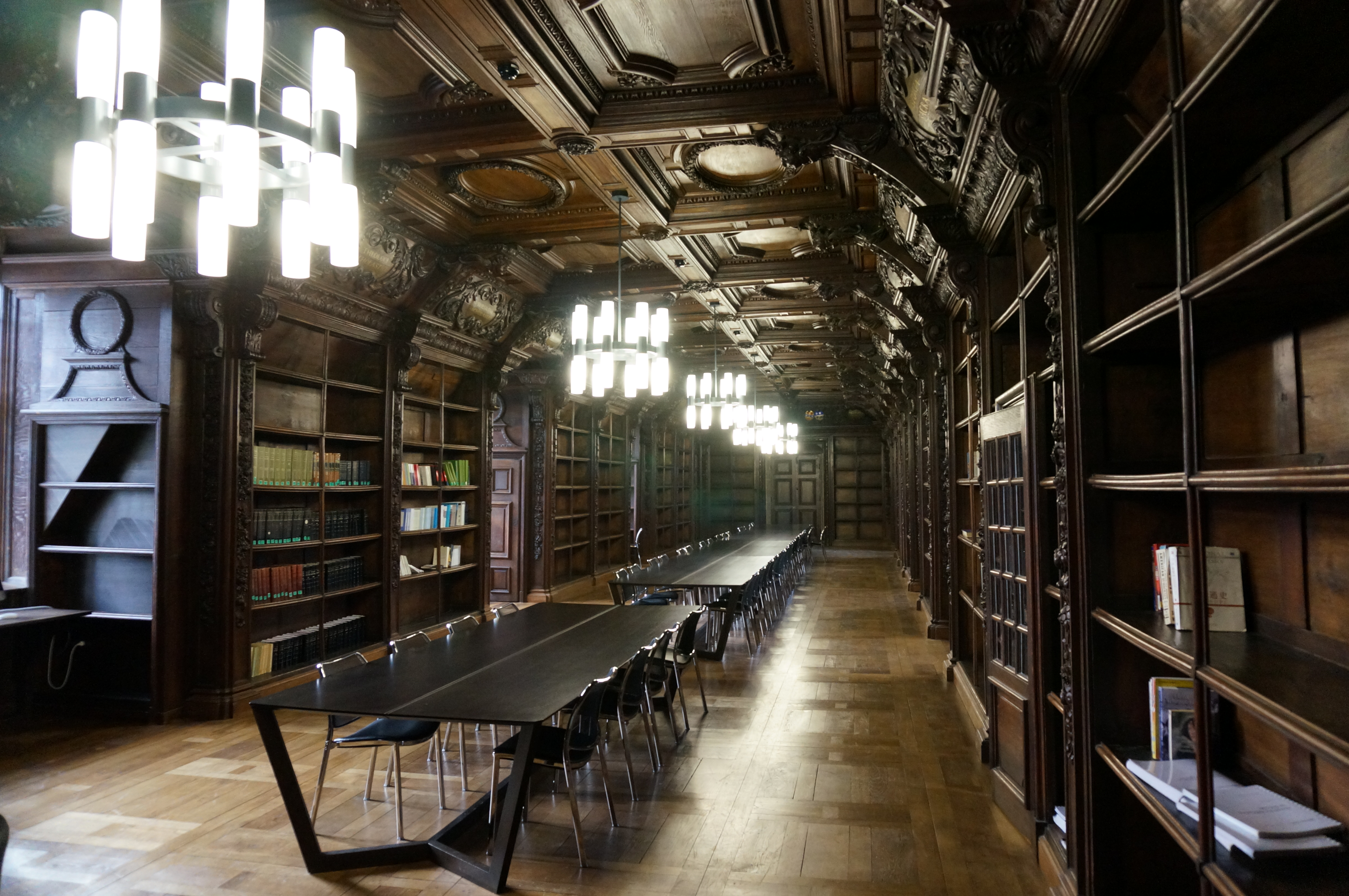
The library

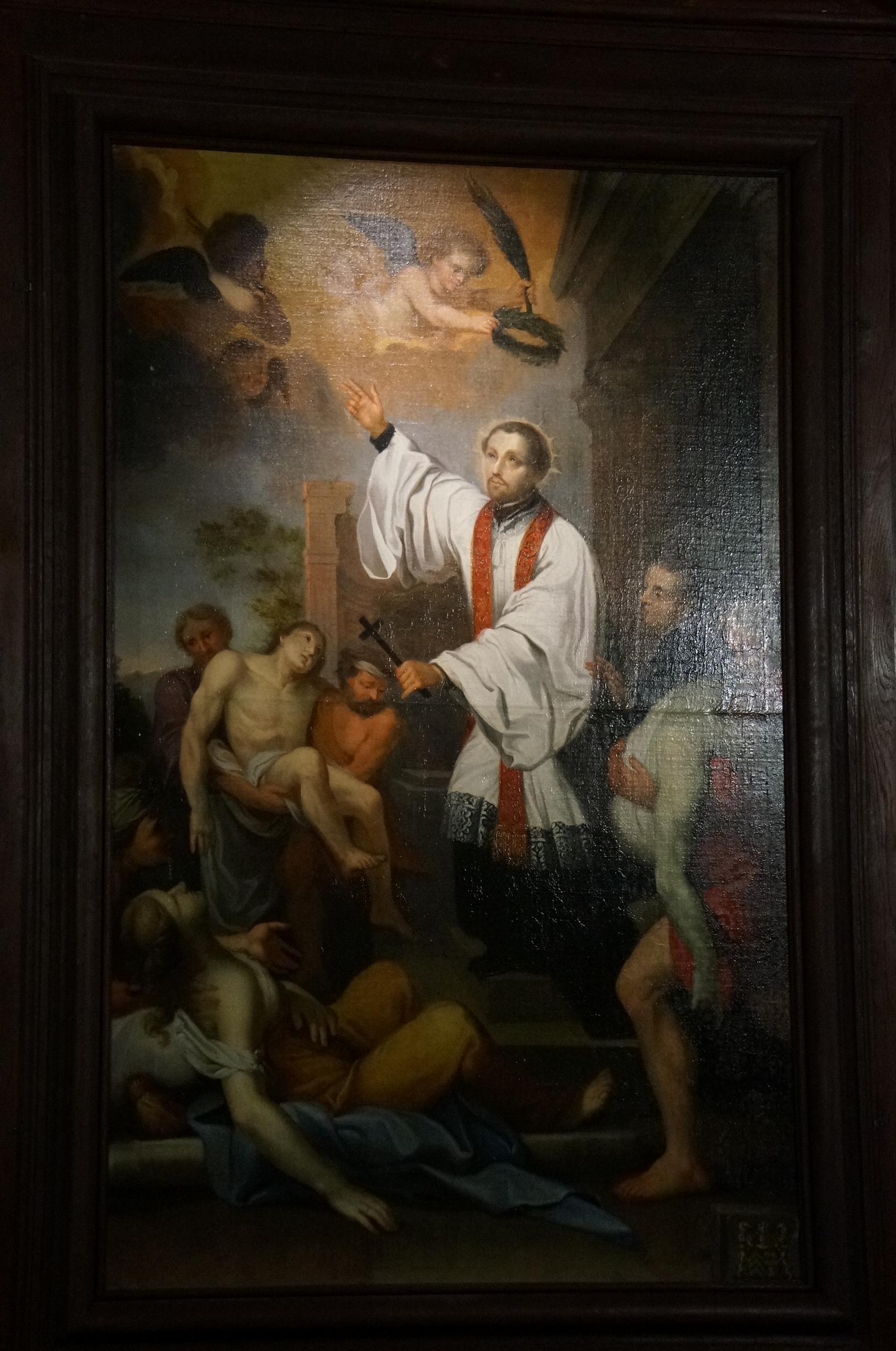
Portrait of Saint Francis-Xavier

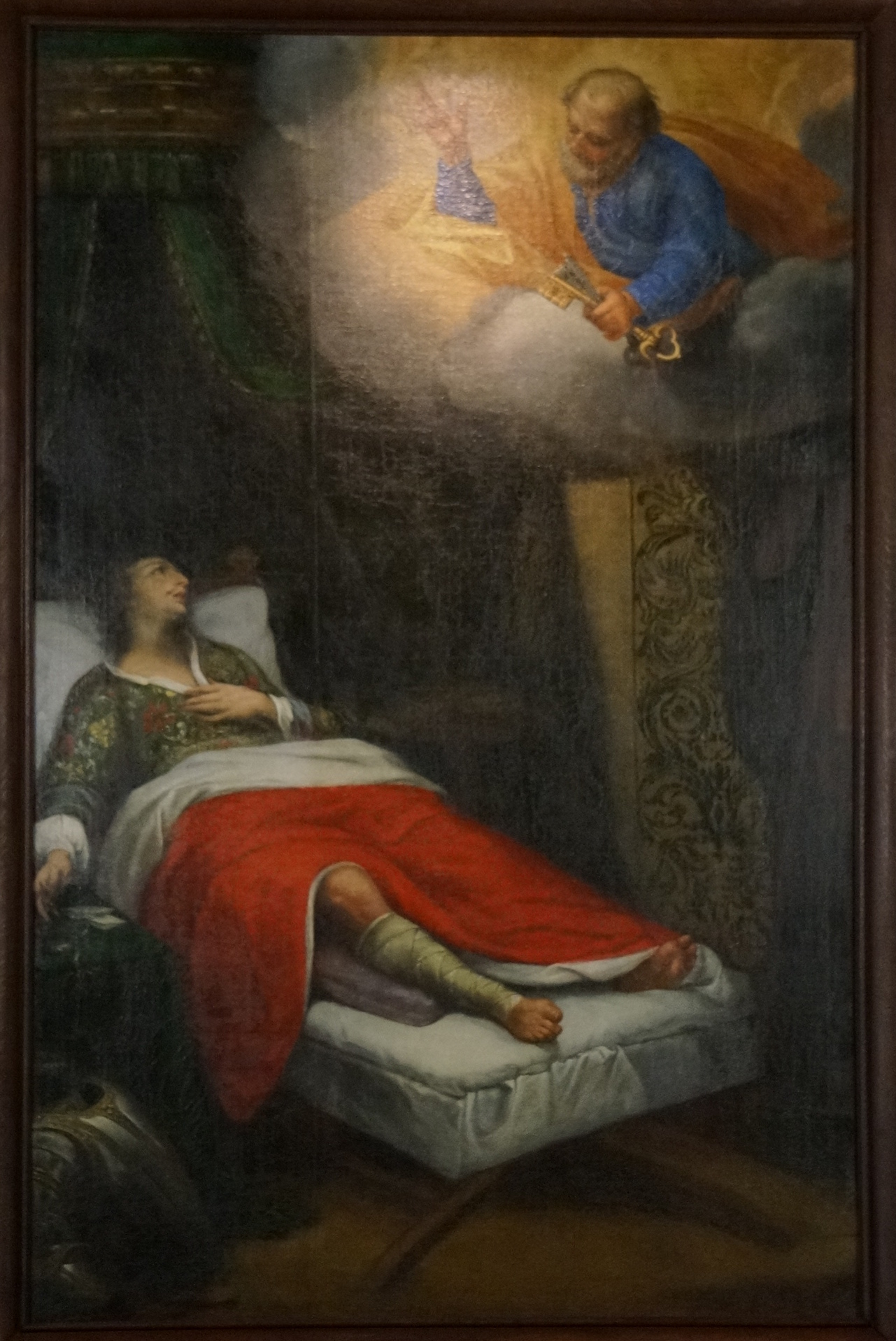
Depiction of Ignatius of Loyola, visited by Saint Peter

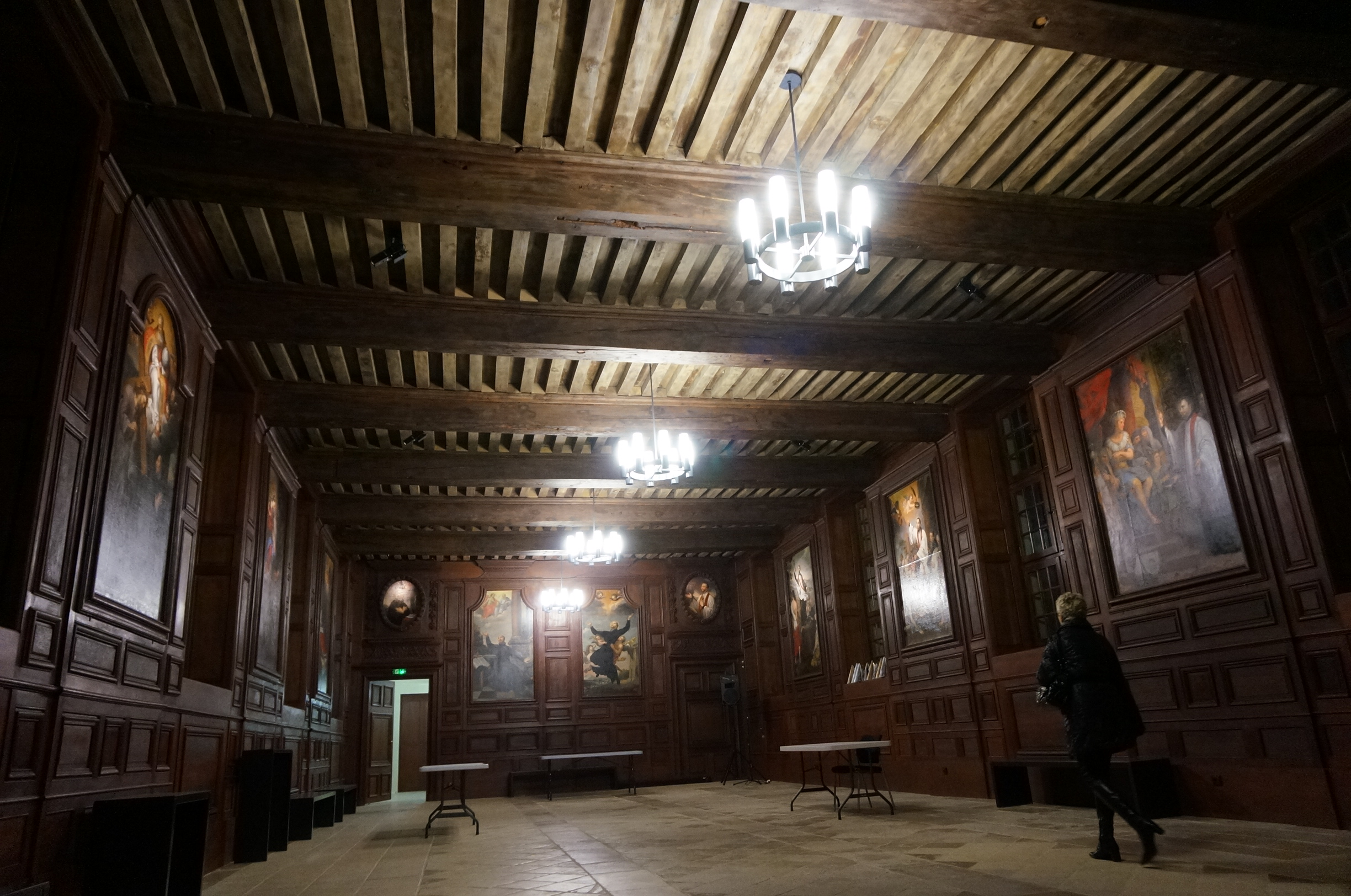
The refectory
