= Reims Manège and Circus =

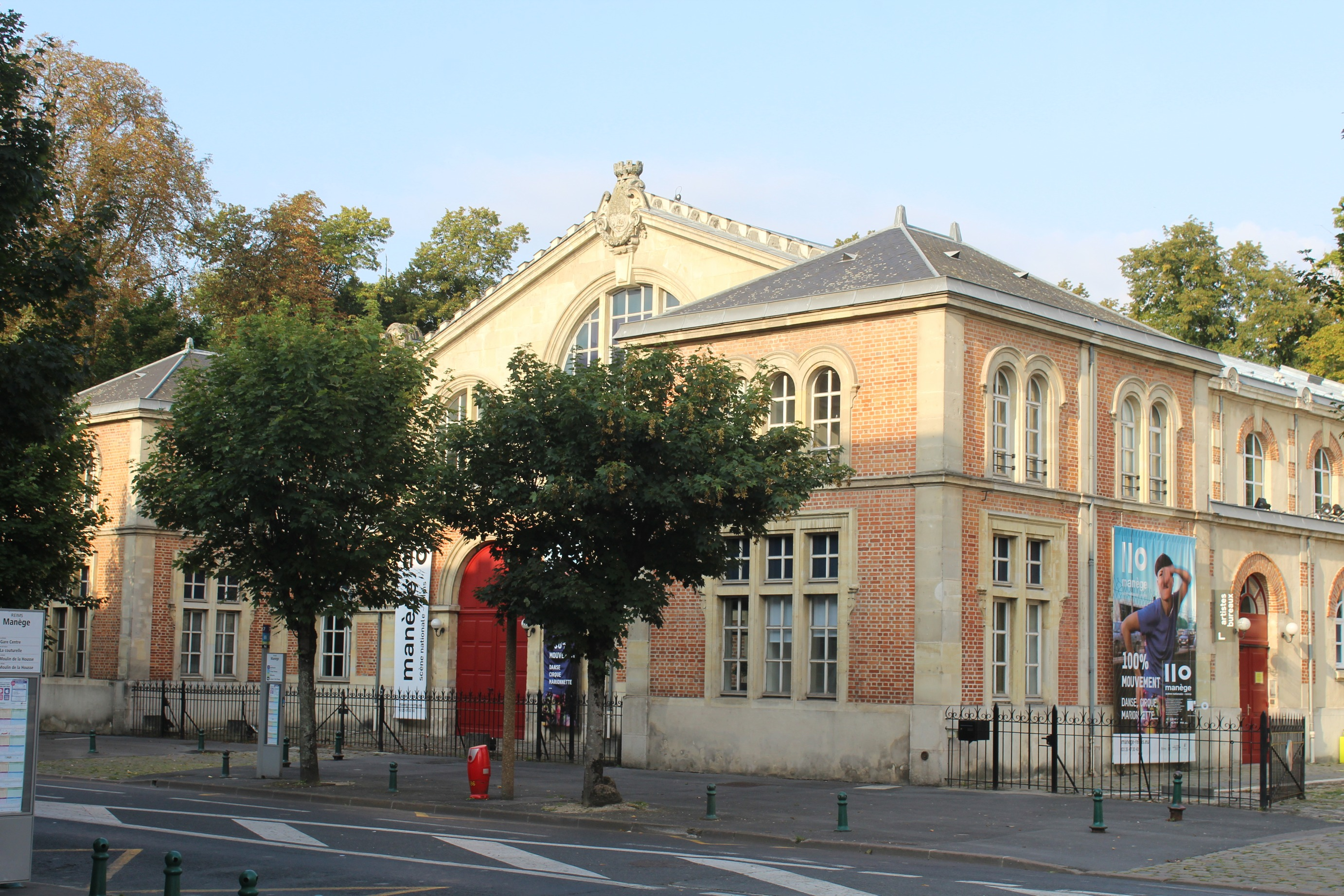
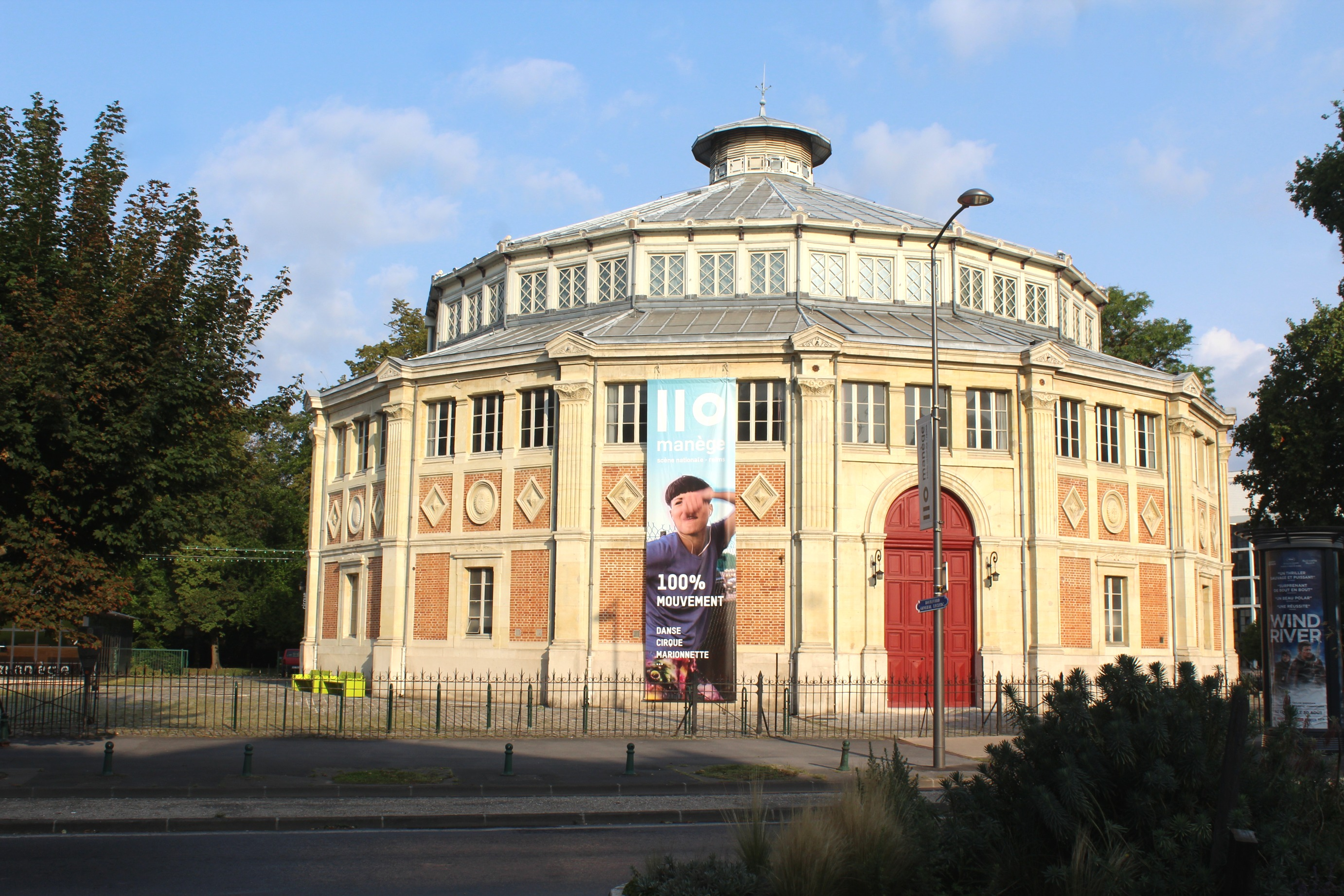
- The Manège (left) and Circus (right)

General information
- Town or city: Reims
- Country: France
- Coordinates: 49.254511°N 4.021960°E and 49.254973°N 4.022149°E

Design and construction
- Architect(s): Narcisse Brunette

Monument historique
- Reference no.: PA00132588

The Reims Manège and Circus (French: Manège et Cirque de Reims) were built in 1865 and 1867 respectively over designs by architect Narcisse Brunette, in Reims, France. The circus was one of many circuses built in France following "the model that Hittorff perfected in Paris."

Both buildings are monuments historiques of France.
