= Nicolas Colibert =

French painter and engraver

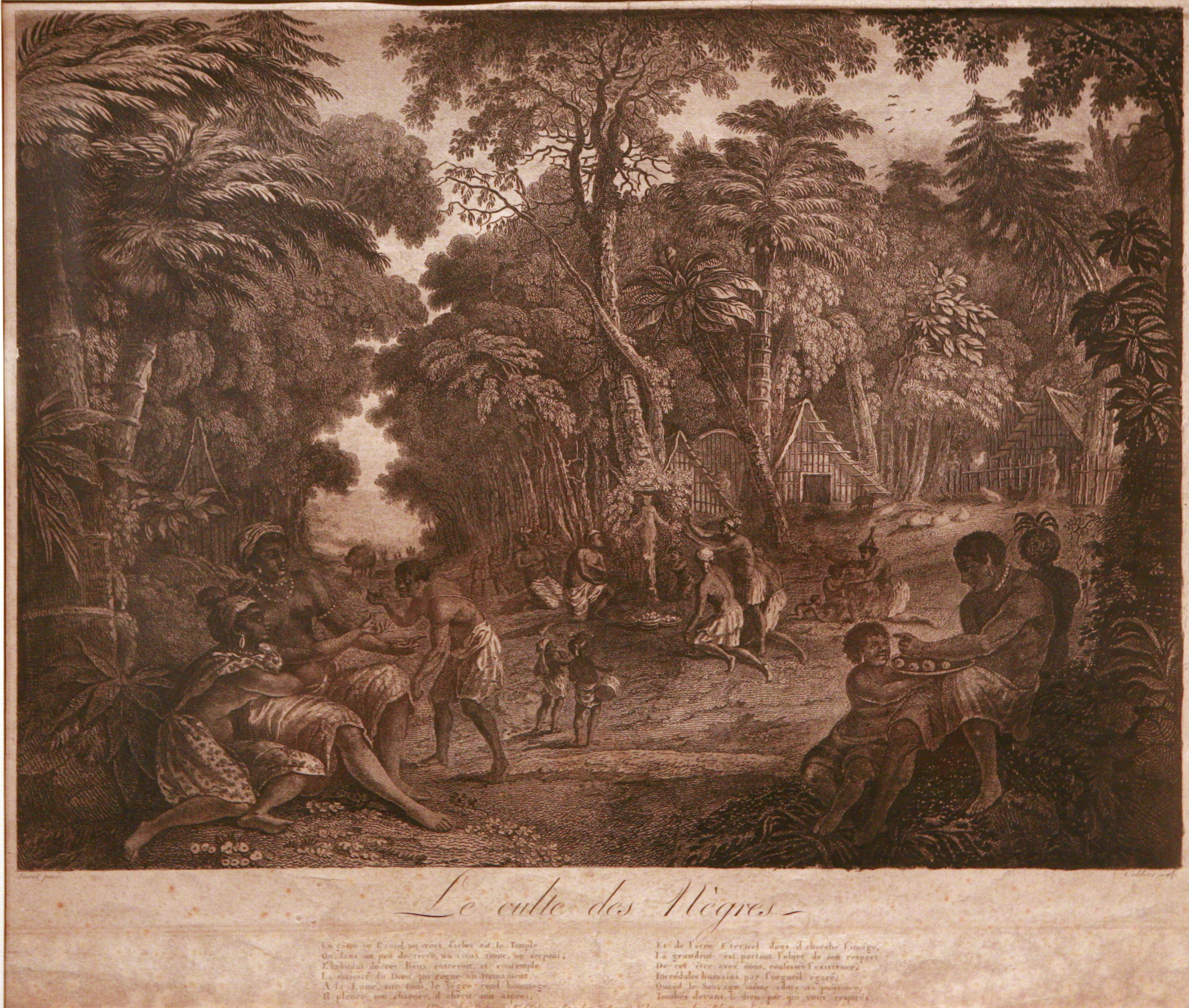
Religion of negroes, engraving, Paris, 1795, made to celebrate the first abolition of slavery on 4 February 1794.

Nicolas Colibert (1750–1806) was a French painter and engraver. He was born in Paris. He executed in the dotted style some landscapes after Casanova, and about 1782 came to London, where he produced two oval plates of 'Pity' and 'Youth,' and two subjects from 'Evelina.' During the Revolution he returned to Paris and engraved several of Schall's designs for 'Les Amours de Psyche et de Cupidon,' published in 1791, and some illustrations after Monsiau to the poem 'La Mort d'Abel,' published in 1793. Colibert died in London in 1806.

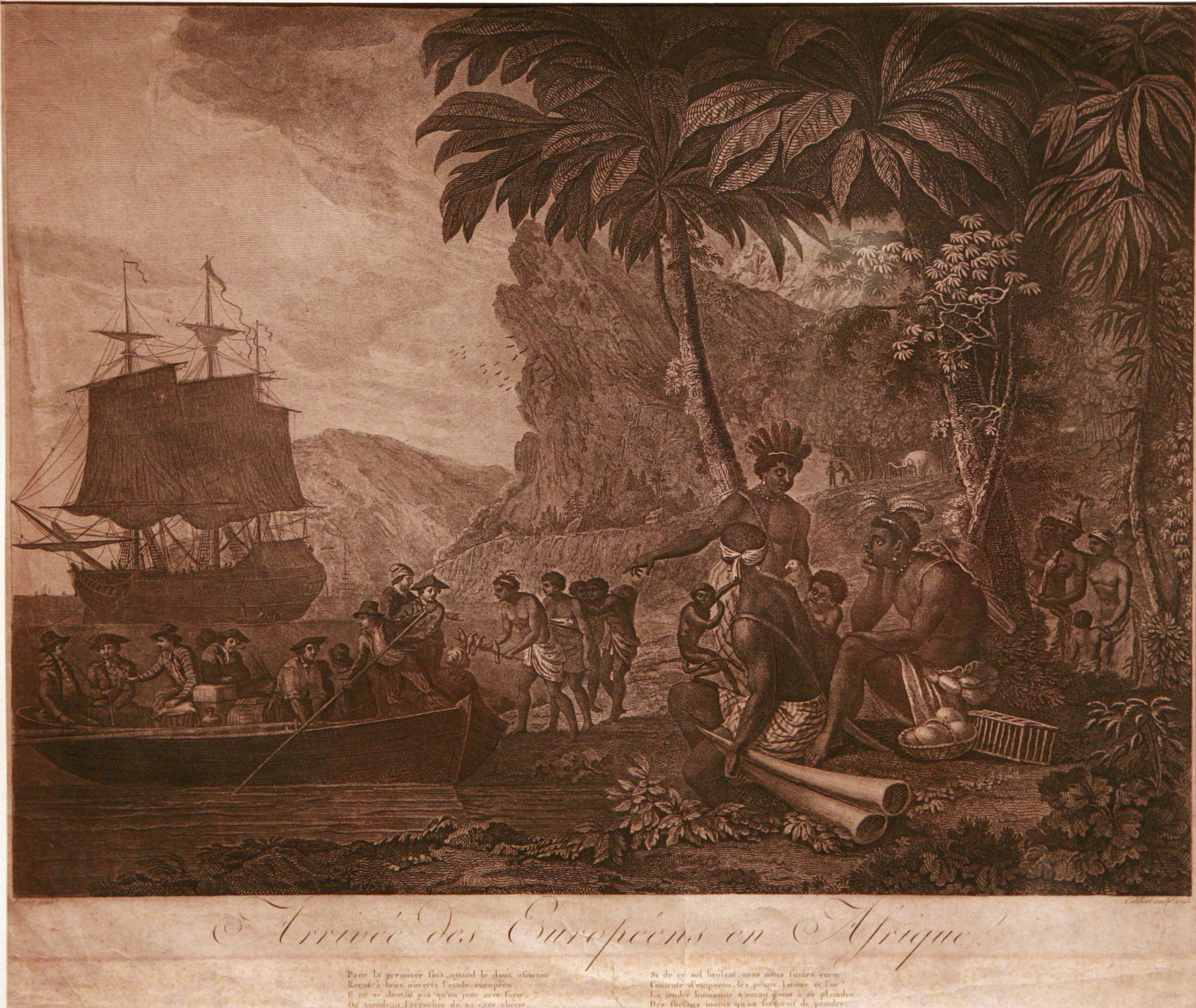
Arrival of Europeans in Africa
