= Narcisse Brunette =

French architect

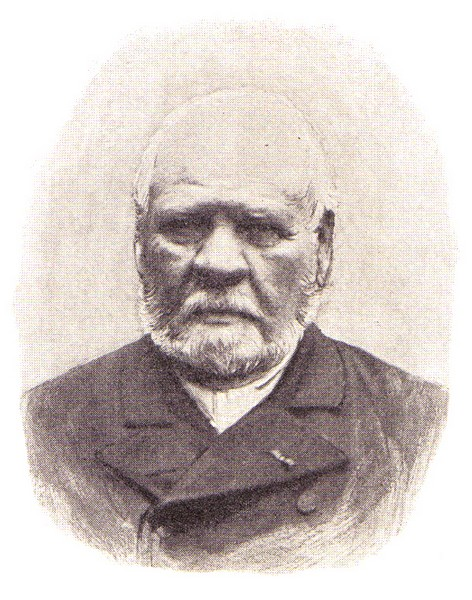
- Born: 15 August 1808; Breuvery-sur-Coole, France
- Died: 8 October 1895 (aged 87); 2 place Royale, Reims, France
- Occupation: Architect

Narcisse Brunette (15 August 1808 – 8 October 1895) was a French architect.

A student of François Debret, Brunette began his career as an inspector and architect engaged in the work on the courthouse of Reims. In 1837, he was appointed architect of the city and hospices of Reims and diocesan architect.

Brunette was, for nearly 50 years, architect of the city of Reims. He was responsible for the rescue of the Basilica of Saint-Remi and of Saint-Maurice. He built the churches of St. Andrew, St. Thomas, the vocational school, the retirement home (later demolished), the Manège and Circus and the Armory. He also restored the Mars Gate.

Among his principal works were restoration of the Church of Saint-Jacques in Reims, the restoration and the enlargement of the general hospital and of the Hôtel de Ville; the construction of a covered market, several communal schools, the Church of Saint-Thomas, the Chapel of Saint-Marcoul, the infantry barracks, the gendarmerie barracks, five city gates in Reims, the office of measurement and conditioning of wool, several churches in the department of Marne and the seminary. He worked on the streets of Reims, a sewage system, paving the streets, and he also established a project for the restoration of the Roman triumphal arch at Reims, which was exhibited in 1835.

In 1847, he published the drawing of the tomb of Saint Remi and, in 1850, the plan of the Gallo-Roman city. He published a "Notice on the Antiquities of Reims" in 1861.

With his son, Ernest Brunette, he built, from 1863 to 1880, the facade of the Town Hall overlooking the street of Grosse-Écritoire.

In 1846, Brunette married Josephine Philippine Rosalie Ponsin (1820–1901) in Reims. He was buried at the North Cemetery there.

== Honours ==
On April 11, 1855, he received the Order of St. Gregory the Great and, on August 11, 1858, he was appointed Knight of the Legion of Honor. On March 21, 1870, he became an officer of the Academy.

Narcisse-Brunette Street in Reims was named for him.
